= Royal Lao Police =

Royal Lao Police Police Royale Laotiènne
- ກຣົມຕຳຮວຈລາວ
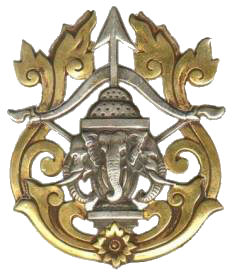
- Royal Lao Police senior officer's cap badge

Agency overview
- Formed: 1950
- Dissolved: 1975
- Superseding agency: Ministry of Public Security (Laos)
- Jurisdiction: National
- Headquarters: Vientiane
- Motto: ມີກຽດ, ປົກປ້ອງສິດທິ "Honorable, Defend Rights"
- Employees: (unknown)
- Annual budget: 1,457,765,000 ₭N (in 1973-1974)
- Agency executive: Lith Luenamachack, Director of the Royal Lao Police

The Royal Lao Police (Lao: ກຣົມຕຳຮວຈລາວ; French: Police Royale Laotiènne – PRL), was the official national police force of the Kingdom of Laos from 1950 to 1975, operating closely with the Royal Lao Armed Forces (FAR) during the Laotian Civil War between 1960 and 1975.

== History ==
The PRL traced back its origins to the immediate aftermath of World War II, when the Laotian Gendarmerie was established by the French Union authorities in May 1946 under the designation Lao National Guard (French: Garde Nationale Laotiènne – GNL), to replace the local sections of the mainly Vietnamese Indochinese Guard (French: Garde Indochinoise). Initially answerable to the Laotian Ministry of Defense, the new GNL was closely modelled after the French National Gendarmerie (French: Gendarmerie Nationale) and although it was to be exclusively composed by Laotian nationals, it was kept under the close supervision of French gendarmes seconded from the Republican Guard units stationed in Indochina. In 1947, with a strength of 1,000 men, the GNL changed its designation to Laotian Gendarmerie Forces (French: Forces de Gendarmerie Laotiènne – FGL; Lao: Kong Kamlang Thahan Ladsa Vong Lao), later altered to Laotian Gendarmerie (French: Gendarmerie Laotiènne; Lao: Kong Truat Lao), and despite being officially transferred to the Laotian Ministry of the Interior and placed that same year under the nominal command of King Sisavang Vong, the Gendarmerie remained in fact under French control. The Laotian Gendarmerie was encharged of enforcing law and order in the country's rural areas, combat Viet Minh guerrilla activity and patrol the borders, and by late 1949, it had reached a strength of 2,500 officers and men, commanded exclusively by French Gendarmerie officers. The rank-and-file were made up of Laotians, with a few of them holding non-commissioned officer (NCO) rank. Disbanded on March 1950 upon the formation of the Laotian National Army (French: Armée Nationale Laotiènne – ANL), it was re-established by official decree on February 13, 1951, as the Royal Lao Gendarmerie or Royal Gendarmerie for short. The new Lao Gendarmerie was charged with safeguarding internal security and public order, with a planned strength of 1,250 officers and enlisted men, though the actual number was lower. By the end of 1955, it had only 540 men – with some being rated as good soldiers, though very few possessed any police training or experience, and 20% of them were illiterate – organized into three companies based in Luang Prabang, Vientiane and Paksé, respectively.

=== Formation of the Laotian National Police 1955–1960 ===
In September 1955, an American aid package, titled the Public Safety Program, provided for the merger of all the Laotian security forces into the Laotian National Police (French: Police Nationale Laotiènne – PNL; Lao: Tamrousat). Ordered by King Sisavang Vong on November 1955, the merger did not become effective until several months later when two royal ordinances dated January 17, 1957, retrospectively, declared that the process to have taken place earlier on January 1, 1956.

=== The PNL and the Laotian coups 1960–1965 ===
In either late 1958 or early 1959, Major general Phoumi Nosavan, the defense minister and strongman of the Kingdom of Laos at the time, appointed his aide de camp Lieutenant colonel Siho Lamphouthacoul as Director General of the Department of National Coordination (Directeur Général de la Coordination Nationale). When Maj. Gen. Phoumi was deposed by Captain Kong Le's coup in August 1960, it seems not to have curtailed Lt. Col. Siho's power nor the growth of his Directorate of National Coordination. In September of that year, he raised and trained to paramilitary standards two special counter-insurgency battalions (French: Bataillons Speciales – BS) within the PNL, designated 11th and 33rd BS respectively, which were gathered into an incomplete regiment designated 1st Special Mobile Group (French: Groupement Mobile Speciale 1 – GMS 1). The new PNL counter-insurgency unit was closely modelled after the Royal Thai Police (RTP) Police Aerial Reinforcement Unit (PARU) Commandos and was similar in function to the later Republic of Vietnam National Police Field Force.

The GMS 1 soon became involved in Laos' domestic politics during the turbulent period of the early 1960s, with its commander Lt. Col. Siho actively conspiring in Maj. Gen. Phoumi's return to power. Between mid-November and late December 1960, GMS 1 paramilitary battalions participated in the retaking of Vientiane from Captain Kong Le's rebel Neutralist airborne units, including the successful capture of the Laotian Aviation (French: Aviation Laotiènne) military runway at Wattay Airfield.

When Kong Le and his rebel paratroopers withdrew from Vientiane after Phoumi's coup succeeded, one of the prisoners they took with them was the head of the National Police. For his actions in support of his patron Maj. Gen. Phoumi's December 1960 countercoup, Lt. Col. Siho was rewarded with a promotion to Brigadier general and given command of a new paramilitary security organization comprising the police forces of Laos, civil and military, together with the security and information services responsible for propaganda and political action. In March 1961 Siho combined his GMS 1 with Laotian National Army or ANL (military intelligence, psychological warfare, and military police units) and PNL (the civil police force and the immigration service) units to form the Directorate of National Coordination or DNC (French: Direction de Coordination Nationale – DCN) paramilitary Security Agency, which was quickly assigned to the Ministry of Defense. Answering only to Maj. Gen. Phoumi, Brig. Gen. Siho and its new security agency quickly took over police duties in Vientiane, exercising near absolute authority in the capital city and began screening the civilian population for Pathet Lao elements and stragglers, which often led to abuses. Brig. Gen. Siho's actions cost funding from the U.S. for police training; however, his GMS 1 was considered the most effective paramilitary unit in the Royal Lao Armed Forces (French: Forces Armées du Royaume – FAR).

Although originally intended to be used in intelligence-gathering and Commando operations, the GMS was primarily kept in Vientiane to support Siho's illicit activities. In reality, the GMS served principally as Siho's private army, gaining a reputation among the civilian populace for both corruption in police duties and military ability as para-commandos. One source refers to them as "gangsters" involved in prostitution, gambling, extortion, sabotage, kidnapping, torture, assassination and political repression. Siho staffed the DNC with his own non-professional personnel, transferred from the Laotian Army. Many of the senior professional Police officials were transferred or found places in the Army and other government slots. A number of illiterate and otherwise unqualified personnel were allowed to join the PNL over the next four years operation under the DNC; these included 1,600 supporters (the majority illiterate) of Maj. Gen. Phoumi that were added to the force in Savannakhet.

In 1962 a 30-man contingent was sent to Thailand to attend Airborne and Commando courses manned by Royal Thai Police (RTP) instructors from the Police Aerial Reinforcement Unit (PARU) at their Camp Narusuan training facilities located near Hua Hin in Prachuap Khiri Khan Province. Upon their return to Laos, they formed the cadre of a new special battalion, 99 BS, which enabled GMS 1 to attain full regimental strength. A DNC training depot and an airborne course were established at Phone Kheng in Vientiane, where 11, 33, and 99 BS were all given parachute training. In 1963 Brig. Gen. Siho appointed Lieutenant colonel Thao Ty as his replacement at the head of the GMS 1 para-commando regiment, while retaining the command of the DNC.

On 18 April 1964, Brig. Gen. Siho staged a coup d'état, during which his DNC police units seized the capital's public infrastructure and took control of the country. However, the coup was short-lived, as Brig. Gen. Siho received international criticism and was quickly outranked by Major general Kouprasith Abhay, who succeeded in being nominated Deputy Commander-in-Chief of the Royal Lao Army (RLA), whilst his ally Major general Ouane Rattikone became the RLA Commander-in-Chief. In response, Siho changed the GMS 1 designation to "Border Police" or "Frontier Police" (French: Police de Frontiers), and kept a low profile.

On 1–3 February 1965, the DNC which had held de facto control over Vientiane during the previous year, was defeated and disbanded by the RLA in the wake of another coup d'état led by Maj. Gen. Kouprasith Abhay held that same month. Brig. Gen. Siho was forced to exile in Thailand and his DNC "empire" was quickly divided, with its units being disbanded: the military intelligence, psychological warfare, and military police personnel were returned to the RLA structure whilst some of the policemen were kept in service and renamed the National Police Corps, which was re-assigned to the Ministry of the Interior of the Royal Lao Government. After two days of negotiations, the DNC's three airborne-qualified Border Police Special Battalions – BS 33, BS 11, and BS 99 – and their commander, Lieutenant colonel Thao Ty agreed to lay down their arms with the option of transferring to the RLA's airborne forces command. By mid-year they had been moved to Seno, near Savannakhet and consolidated into a new parachute regiment, Airborne Mobile Group 21 (French: Groupement Mobile 21 Aeroportée – GM 21) under Thao Ty's command.

== Structure ==
The Laotian security forces were divided into several "branches of service" or departments, which comprised a plainclothes criminal investigation department, an immigration service, a customs service, an urban constabulary, a regional gendarmerie and a counter-insurgency armed support unit. All these formations were subordinated to the Laotian Ministry of the Interior of the Royal Lao Government in Vientiane.

=== Metropolitan Police and Patrol Service ===
The regular Laotian Police branch, this was the uniformed urban constabulary – also designated variously as Urban Police, Municipal Police, Civil Police, Civil Police Force (French: Force de Police Civile) or National Police Corps (French: Corps de Police Nationale) – charged of providing security and maintaining law and order in the main population centers, including the nation's capital city and the provincial capitals.

=== Gendarmerie and Territorial Police ===
The Royal Lao Gendarmerie (French: Gendarmerie Royale Laotiènne – GRL), was the regional gendarmerie of Laos, charged with patrolling the countryside; it was organized into sixty-two companies, with one being allocated to each province.

=== Judicial Police ===
The Judicial Police or Judiciary Police (French: Police Judiciaire) was the plainclothes criminal investigation department or Detective branch of the PRL, being responsible for the investigation of criminal offenses and identification of perpetrators.

=== Special Police ===
The Special Police (French: Police Speciale), was the Special Branch of the PRL and the successor of the Laotian section of the indochinese Sûreté Générale secret police established earlier during the French protectorate of Laos. It served as an intelligence agency tasked with national security by acquiring and developing intelligence on internal and external threats to the Kingdom of Laos, subversive activities, and prevent acts of sabotage and espionnage.

=== Security Police ===
The Security Police (French: Police de Sécurité) was the close protection unit of the PRL, encharged of protecting VIPs and key premises.

=== Traffic Police ===
The Traffic Police (French: Police de la circulation or Circulation) was the traffic regulation branch of the PRL, which operated closely with the Royal Lao Army's Military Police from 1959 to 1975.

=== Marine Police ===
The Marine Police (French: Police Nautique or Police Fluviale) was the "naval" branch of the Laotian security forces, encharged of providing a waterborne law-enforcement capability to assist the PRL in countering Pathet Lao activity on the Mekong River, the main navigable inland waterway that extended through Laos. In that capacity, the Marine Police had responsibility for control and maintenance of security on the Mekong and its river ports in the Kingdom of Laos, the support of resources control, the enforcement of civil and fluvial law, and assistance in other police activities. It operated a fleet of six Cabin-type patrol boats, two Chris-Craft patrol boats, 21 river boats 26-feet in length, powered by long-shaft motors, and four 21-foot shallow-draft boats which used a conventional 50 horsepower outboard engine. These 34 vessels were used mainly on the Mekong River and in addition to their use as patrol craft, provided access to otherwise isolated police posts, particularly north of Ban Houei Sai, and in the vicinity south of Vientiane. The Marine Police fleet also provided essential emergency services to the civilian population during natural disasters.

=== Airport Security Police ===
The Airport Security Police (French: Police de sécurité de l'aéroport – PSA) was encharged of providing general security and aviation security duties at the Wattay International Airport near Vientiane.

=== Immigration Service ===
The Immigration Police Service (French: Service d'immigration) was responsible for enforcement of the Laotian Immigration Law, for processing all entries and exits, investigation of all violations of immigration laws and regulations, investigation of applicants for visas, stay permits and passports, and the issuance of travel documents and visas.

=== Customs Service ===
The Customs Service (French: Service des douanes & regies) was set up in the mid-1950s to enforce border control and supervise the flux of personnel and goods on the nation's main riverine ports, airports, and at the border crossings with neighboring Thailand, Burma, China, Cambodia and Vietnam.

=== Crime Suppression Division ===
The Crime Suppression Division (French: Division de la Répression de la Criminalité – DRC) was a specialized unit of the PRL, responsible for conducting most of the technical investigations of criminal offenses throughout Laos; these included public disorders (demonstrations, strikes and riots), sabotage, counterfeiting, fraud, illegal gambling operations, and narcotics trafficking.

=== Fire Division ===
The Fire Division (French: Division des incendies) was encharged of monitoring and coordinating all the Firefighting services in Vientiane and the provincial capitals.

=== Administration Service ===
The Administration Service (French: Service administratif) was the bureaucratic and administrative department of the PRL.

=== Police Medical Service ===
The Police Medical Service (French: Service de Santé de la Police – SSP) was the medical support department of the PRL, which provided medical services to all Police personnel and their families.

=== Inspection Service ===
The Inspection Service (French: Service de Inspection) was directly responsible to the PRL Director General and acted in his behalf in conducting inspections of police operations at all levels. It was also responsible for internal security investigations, enforcing police discipline, planning and implementing new police regulations, and maintained a police public relations program.

=== Intendance Service ===
The Intendance Service (French: Service de Intendance) was the Quartermaster department of the PRL, charged of providing logistical support to Police units. Its functions included general supply (except for ammunition and medical supplies), subsistence (food service), fuel and water, textile repair, plus material and distribution management.

=== Communications Service ===
The Communications Service (French: Service des communications) was the signals department of the PRL, charged of operating the Police National telecommunications network.

=== Matériel Service ===
The Matériel Service (French: Service de Matériel) was the logistics department of the PRL, specialised in the maintenance and repair of equipment or hardware (Materiel).

=== Instruction Service ===
The Instruction Service (French: Service d'instruction) was the training department of the PRL.

== Training institutions ==
Police training was initially the responsibility of the Police College (French: École de Police) at Done Tieuo in Vientiane, established in 1950 by the French, where Lao recruits underwent military-style training programs that included physical education, self-defense, close combat, and shooting. A separate Police Training Academy, the PRL Police School (French: École de Police Royale Lao) was built by the United States Programs Evaluation Office (PEO) in the late 1950s at Ban Donnoun, located 10 kilometers east of Vientiane, where U.S. instructors taught Laotian cadres basic police procedures. In addition, selected PRL personnel were also sent to the United States, the Philippines, Thailand, Singapore, Hong Kong and Malaysia to attend specialized courses.

== List of Director Generals of Police ==
- Pheng Souvannavong (1947–1948)
- Leck Soumpholphakdy (1948)
- Captain Jean Deuve – Acting Director General of the PNL (1948–1952)
- Khamsene Bounnhaseng (1952–1954)
- Brigadier general Prince Somsanith Vongkotrattana (1954–1958)
- Colonel (later, Brigadier general) Soukan Vilairsarn (1958–1964)
- Lieutenant colonel (later, Brigadier general) Siho Lamphouthacoul (1964–1965)
- Colonel Bounkhong Pradichit – Acting Director General of the PNL (1965–?)
- Major general Lith Luenamachack (?–1975)

=== Police junior commanders ===
- Police Colonel Vattha Phanekham – Special Police Commander (1965–?)
- Police Colonel Heng Saythavy – Champasak province Senator.
- Police Colonel Kavinh Keonakhone
- Police Colonel Bounmy Sananikone
- Police Colonel Bounthong Sengkhamyong – Chief of Police of Xiangkhouang province in Military Region 2 (MR 2).
- Police Lieutenant colonel Thao Ty – Commander of the GMS 1 (1960–1965).
- Police Lieutenant colonel Khammouk Phaengsyaroun – Pakse Police Commander.
- Police Lieutenant colonel Kouang Phetxoumphou – Police Subdivision Commander of Attapeu province.
- Police Lieutenant Colonel Phao Abhay – Police Subdivision Commander of Sithandone province.
- Police Lieutenant colonel Koracanh Kamkasouphou – Police Subdivision Commander of Wapikhathong province.
- Police Major Yang Chao – Deputy chief of Police of Xiangkhouang province (MR 2).
- Police Major Hang Doua
- Police Major Khongsei Baphavan – Police Subdivision Commander of Champasak province.
- Police Major Sing Vetsmany – Police Subdivision Commander of Houa Khong province.
- Police Major Bounsou Silalack – Police Subdivision Commander of Vientiane province.
- Police Captain Keung Mahathirath – Police Subdivision Commander of Borikhane province.

== Weapons and equipment ==
The PRL was lightly armed by military standards, but heavily equipped by conventional police standards, being well-provided with U.S. small-arms. Its weaponry was surplus World War II/Korean War-vintage – the standard issue weapon was the M1/M2 carbine, complemented by semi-automatic rifles, submachine guns, and light and medium machine guns. Police units had no crew-served weapons such as mortars or any other indirect fire weapons systems, although these could be loaned by the Royal Lao Army (RLA) as required.

- United States M1917 revolver
- United States Smith & Wesson Model 10 Revolver
- United States Smith & Wesson Model 15 Revolver
- United States Smith & Wesson SW2 Bodyguard .38 Special snub-nose revolver
- United States Colt Cobra .38 Special snub-nose revolver
- United States Colt.45 M1911A1 Pistol
- United States Smith & Wesson Model 39 Pistol
- United States M1A1 Thompson submachine gun
- United States M3A1 Grease Gun
- United States M1/M2 Carbine
- United States M1 Garand rifle
- United States M1918A2 BAR light machine gun
- United States Browning M1919A4 .30 Cal medium machine gun
- United States Browning M1919A6 .30 Cal light machine gun

=== Vehicles ===
- United States Willys MB ¼-ton (4×4) jeep
- United States Willys M38 MC ¼-ton (4×4) jeep
- United States Willys M38A1 MD ¼-ton (4×4) jeep
- United States Jeep Wagoneer (4×4) hardtop Sport utility vehicle (SUV)
- United States International Scout 800 (4×4) utility truck
- United Kingdom Land Rover series II (4×4) utility truck
- Japan Honda 100cc motorcycle

=== Watercraft ===
- United States Cabin-type patrol boat
- United States Chris-Craft patrol boat
- 21-foot shallow-draft boat, powered by a 50-horsepower outboard engine
- 26-foot river boat, powered by a long-shaft motor

== Uniforms and insignia ==
Some PRL senior officers also wore as service dress a light Beige-Khaki British-style, open-collar, short-sleeved KD bush jacket which had two pleated breast pockets and two pleated side pockets closed by pointed flaps, a four-button front fly, shoulder straps, and an integral cloth belt.

Initially, GMS paratroopers of the DNC wore dark blue fatigues, whose cut followed closely that of the U.S. Army OG-107 jungle utilities, to distinguish them from the rest of the Royal Lao Armed Forces (FAR).

=== Headgear ===
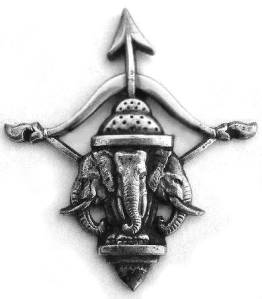
Royal Lao Police enlisted men's cap badge

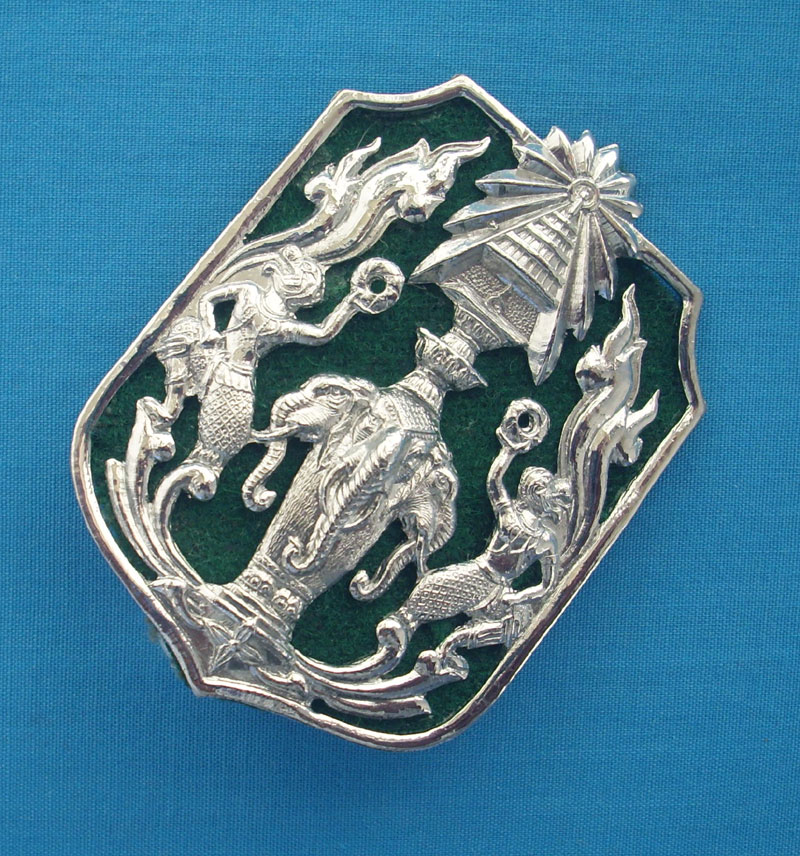
Royal Lao Gendarmerie officer's cap badge 1947-75.

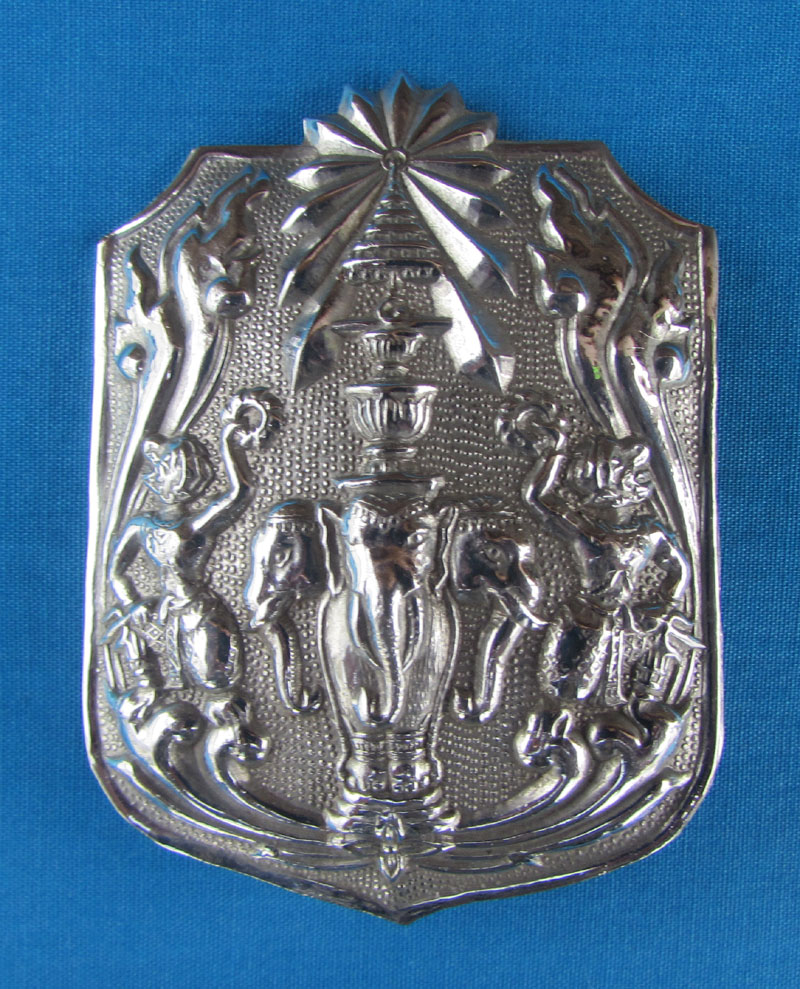
Royal Lao Gendarmerie enlisted men's cap badge 1947-75.

Royal Lao Police peaked caps were worn with the standard metal PRL cap device, a silver bow and arrow per pale charged with the Airavata crest bearing the Laotian Royal Arms (Erawan) – a three-headed white elephant standing on a pedestal and surmounted by a pointed parasol – inserted on a gilt wreath representing flames emerging from a Lotus leaf rosette below. It was issued in three versions according to rank: large flames for Officers, smaller ones for NCO's and none for enlisted ranks.

Early DNC and GMS service headgear consisted on a badgeless black beret worn American-style, pulled to the right – in contrast to the FAR, where berets were still being worn pulled to the left in typical French fashion – reflecting the influence of the training cadres received from the Thai PARU in 1962. In the field, the beret was often replaced by a U.S. M-1C jump helmet.

=== Footwear ===
Black leather low laced shoes were prescribed to wear by uniformed police agents and Gendarmerie personnel assigned patrol duties on urban areas. Regulation footwear in the DNC and GMS were the calf-length French M1950 or M1950/53 TAP (Bottes de saut modéle 1950 et 1950/53) black leather jump-boot models and the U.S. Army M-1962 "McNamara" black leather combat boots.

=== Accoutrements ===
GMS web gear In the field was a mix of U.S. M-1945 and M-1956 load-carrying equipments (LCE), respectively in khaki and olive green cotton canvas and standard issue in the FAR.

=== Royal Lao Police and Gendarmerie ranks ===
- Police General
- Police Lieutenant General
- Police Major General
- Police Colonel
- Police Lieutenant Colonel
- Police Major
- Police Captain
- Police Lieutenant
- Police Sub-lieutenant
- Acting Police Lieutenant
- Police cadet 2
- Police cadet 1
- Police Master Sergeant
- Police Sergeant Lieutenant
- Police Sergeant Major
- Police Sergeant
- Police Corporal
- Police Lance Corporal
- Patrolman/Patrolwoman

=== Insignia ===
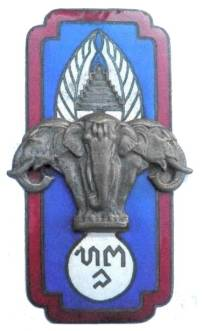
Royal Lao Gendarmerie pocket badge 1951-75.

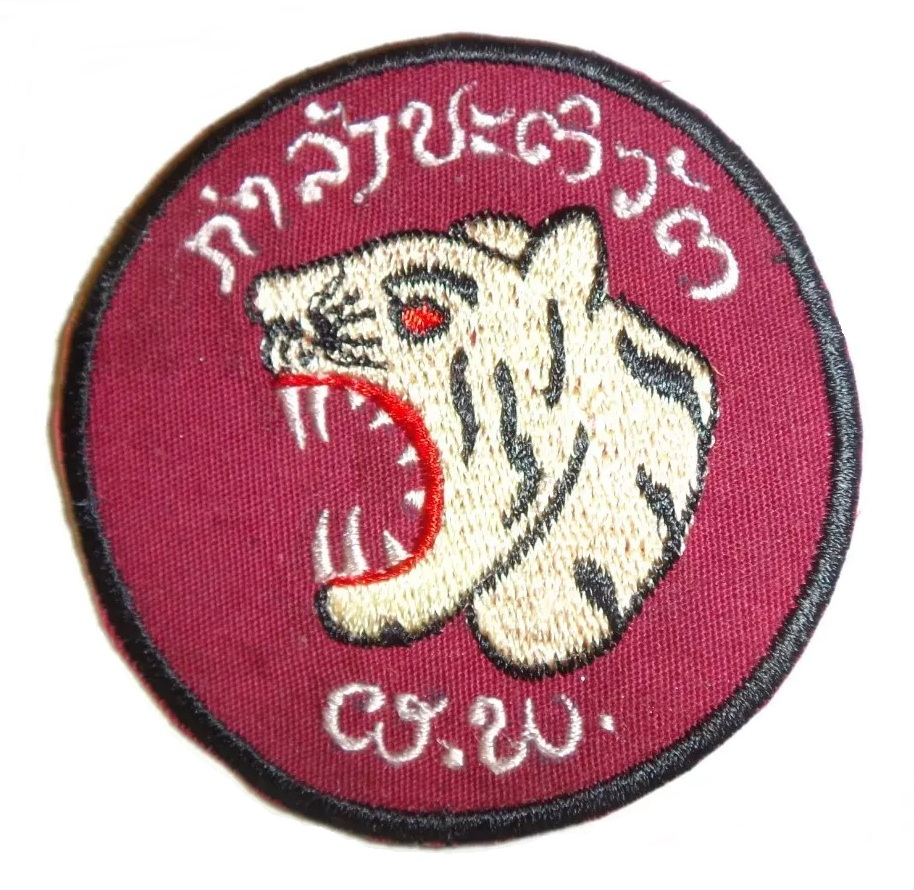
DNC Revolutionary Forces patch 1961-65.

Although the DNC adopted in 1960-61 a gilt metal cap badge, the GMS never developed a distinctive unit insignia nor a beret badge, and even rank insignia was seldom seen on uniforms; a commemorative embroidered red round patch edged black bearing a snarling tiger's head surmounted by the Laotian inscription "Revolutionary Forces" (Lao: ກຳ ລັງປະຕິວັດ | kam lang pativad), which celebrated Siho's recapture of Vientiane in 1960, was worn on the left shoulder. In 1962 the DNC adopted a distinctive set of gold parachute wings in three classes modelled after the PARU airborne qualification badge, which were worn above the right pocket of the fatigue shirt.

== See also ==
- Air America (airline)
- Cambodian Civil War
- Directorate of National Coordination (Laos)
- First Indochina War
- Laotian Civil War
- List of weapons of the Laotian Civil War
- List of weapons of the Vietnam War
- Ministry of Public Security (Laos)
- Military Regions of Laos
- National Gendarmerie (France)
- Republican Guard (France)
- Royal Lao Armed Forces
- Royal Lao Army Airborne
- Royal Thai Police
- Republic of Vietnam National Police
- Republic of Vietnam National Police Field Force
- Royal Thai Police Aerial Reinforcement Unit (PARU)
- Vietnam War
- 1967 Opium War
