= Directorate of National Coordination =

- ຜູ້ອໍານວຍການປະສານງານແຫ່ງຊາດ; Direction de Coordination Nationale
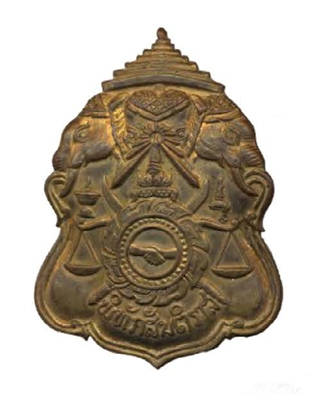
- Directorate of National Coordination beret cap badge 1960-1965
- Active: September 1960 – 3 February 1965
- Country: Kingdom of Laos
- Allegiance: Royal Lao Government
- Branch: Laotian National Police
- Type: Paramilitary police, para-commandos
- Size: 6,500 men (at height)
- Part of: Royal Lao Armed Forces
- Headquarters: Phone Kheng, Muong Phene, Phou Khao Khouay (all near Vientiane)
- Nicknames: DNC (DCN in French), Border Police
- Engagements: Laotian Civil War; Battle of Vientiane; Battle of Nong Boua Lao

Commanders
- Notable commanders: Siho Lamphouthacoul; Thao Ty

The Directorate of National Coordination or DNC (French: Direction de Coordination Nationale – DCN) was the para-commando unit of the Laotian National Police (French: Police Nationale Laotiènne – PNL; Lao: Tamrousat), which was closely modelled after the Royal Thai Police (RTP) Border Patrol Police Aerial Reinforcement Unit (PARU) commandos and similar in function to the later South Vietnamese National Police Field Force, the DNC was active during the early phase of the Laotian Civil War from 1960 to 1965.

== Role ==
The DNC specialized in counter-insurgency, CQB/CQC in urban areas, high-risk tactical law enforcement situations, long-range penetration, operating in difficult to access terrain with commando tactics, special reconnaissance in difficult to access and dangerous areas, and tactical special operations.

== Origins ==
The history of the DNC began in the late 1950s when Major general Phoumi Nosavan, the defense minister and strongman of the Kingdom of Laos at the time, appointed his aide de camp Lieutenant colonel Siho Lamphouthacoul as Director General of the Department of National Coordination (Directeur Général de la Coordination Nationale); the exact date of this appointment is uncertain, though it certainly took place in either late 1958 or early 1959. When Maj. Gen. Phoumi was deposed by Captain Kong Le's coup in August 1960, it seems not to have curtailed Lt. Col. Siho's power nor the growth of his Directorate of National Coordination. In September of that year, he raised and trained to paramilitary standards two special counter-insurgency battalions (Bataillons Speciales – BS) within the Laotian National Police (French: Police Nationale Laotiènne – PNL; Lao: Tamrousat), 11 and 33 BS, which were gathered into an incomplete regiment designated 1st Special Mobile Group (Groupement Mobile Speciale 1 – GMS 1).

== The DNC in the Laotian civil war ==
=== Early GMS 1 operations ===
The new unit soon became involved in Laos' domestic politics during the turbulent period of the early 1960s, with its commander Lt. Col. Siho actively conspiring in Maj. Gen. Phoumi Nosavan's return to power. On 17 November 1960, while acting as Maj. Gen. Phoumi's intelligence officer, he contacted a U.S. Special Forces (USSF) unit, Team Ipsen. Four river gunboats of the Laotian Navy (Marine Laotiènne) were positioned in the Mekong River at Ban Sot to block Maj. Gen. Phoumi's troops advance northwards from Savannakhet towards Vientiane. On 19 November, Siho and USSF Team Ipsen set up an ambush for the Laotian Navy gunboats. However, before the boats could show up to spring it, Maj. Gen. Phoumi launched his counter-coup with a combined airborne and amphibious assault on Vientiane. Siho and his GMS 1 battalions boarded Laotian Navy landing crafts in Savannakhet on 21 November to participate in the retaking of Vientiane from Kong Le's rebel Neutralist airborne units. When Maj. Gen. Phoumi's forces finally reached the Laotian capital, Siho and his paratroopers led the assault on the city. On the last day of the Battle of Vientiane, December 16, GMS 1 successfully captured the Laotian Aviation (Aviation Laotiènne) military runway at Wattay Airfield.

=== Creation of the DNC ===
When Kong Le and his rebel paratroopers withdrew from Vientiane after Phoumi's coup succeeded, one of the prisoners they took with them was the head of the National Police. For his actions during the December 1960 countercoup, Lt. Col. Siho was rewarded with a promotion to Brigadier general and given command of a new paramilitary security organization comprising the police forces of Laos, civil and military, together with the security and information services responsible for propaganda and political action. In March 1961 Siho combined his GMS 1 with Laotian National Army or ANL (military intelligence, psychological warfare, and military police units) and PNL (the civil police force and the immigration service) units to form the DNC, which was quickly assigned to the Ministry of Defense.

Answering only to Maj. Gen. Phoumi, Brig. Gen. Siho and its new security agency quickly took over police duties in Vientiane, exercising near absolute authority in the capital city and began screening the civilian population for Pathet Lao elements and stragglers, which often led to abuses. Brig. Gen. Siho's actions cost funding from the U.S. for police training; however, his GMS 1 was considered the most effective paramilitary police unit in the Royal Lao Armed Forces (Forces Armées du Royaume – FAR), and through Siho's influence, they were the first unit in the PRL and FAR to be completely outfitted with the U.S. automatic M-2 carbine.

=== DNC operations 1961–1964 ===
The now airborne qualified GMS 1 was soon put to test in April 1961, when they were sent north to prevent Kong Le's Neutralist Armed Forces (Forces Armées Neutralistes – FAN) troops and their Pathet Lao communist allies from moving down from the Plain of Jars and recapturing Vientiane. On 25 April, they were deployed on the southern bank of the Lik River (Lao language: Nam Lik), successfully blocking the only paved road leading to the capital, Route 13.

During the following year a 30-person contingent was sent to Thailand to attend Airborne and Commando courses taught by Royal Thai Police (RTP) instructors from the PARU at their Camp Narusuan training facilities located near Hua Hin in Prachuap Khiri Khan Province. Upon their return they formed the cadre of a new special battalion, 99 BS, which enabled GMS 1 to attain full regimental strength. A DNC training depot and an airborne course were established at Phone Kheng in Vientiane, where 11, 33, and 99 BS were all given parachute training.

==== Involvement in illicit activities ====
Once the threat to Vientiane had passed, the DNC settled into a low-level struggle with the Royal Lao Army (RLA) for control of the Vientiane vice trade, with Siho and Kouprasith constantly skirmishing over the corrupt prerequisites of power. Both Generals wanted payoffs for allowing gambling, opium dealing, smuggling, and the importation of essential medicines. Although originally intended to be used in intelligence-gathering and commando operations and rated as the most capable military unit in Laos, the GMS was primarily kept in Vientiane to support Siho's illicit activities. In reality, the GMS served principally as Siho's private army, gaining a reputation among the civilian populace for both corruption in police duties and military ability as para-commandos. One source refers to them as "gangsters" involved in prostitution, gambling, extortion, sabotage, kidnapping, torture, assassination and political repression. Siho staffed the DNC with his own non-professional personnel, transferred from the Laotian Army. Many of the senior professional Police officials were transferred or found places in the Army and other government slots. A number of illiterate and otherwise unqualified personnel were allowed to join the LNP over the next four years operation under the DNC; these included 1,600 supporters (the majority illiterate) of Maj. Gen. Phoumi that were added to the force in Savannakhet.

On 5 November 1961, Brig. Gen. Siho's DNC personnel arrested a FAN intelligence officer who was on business in Vientiane; the detainee was released two days later. Later on November 29, a DNC unit began irregular operations near Thakhek in the Military Region 3 (Savannakhet). However, this action came to an abrupt end in December when Siho's demands for tactical control of the operation through the communications network was refused. In 1963 Brig. Gen. Siho appointed Lieutenant colonel Thao Ty as his replacement at the head of the GMS 1 para-commando regiment.

==== Siho's coup attempt ====
In February 1964 GMS 1 was brought down to Savannakhet in Military Region 3 to recapture the village of Nong Boua Lao held by Pathet Lao guerrilla forces, which had already repelled several assaults by the RLA. Although the three para battalions successfully assaulted the village, they were withdrawn to conduct yet another coup d'état in Vientiane (however, another source states that the GMS battalions were actually withdrawn before they could reach their objective). On 17 April 1964 the Kingdom of Laos Prime Minister Souvanna Phouma made the decision to enter negotiations with the Pathet Lao leader, his communist brother Prince Souphanouvong on the Plain of Jars. Upon learning this, Brig. Gen. Siho decided to take matters into its own hands and stage a pre-emptive coup d'état. The following day, DNC police units seized the capital's public infrastructure and took control of the country. However, the coup of 18 April 1964 was short-lived, as Brig. Gen. Siho received international criticism and was quickly outranked by Major general Kouprasith Abhay, who succeeded in being nominated Deputy Commander-in-Chief of the RLA, whilst his ally Major general Ouane Rattikone became the RLA Commander-in-Chief. In response, Siho changed the GMS designation to Border Police (Police de Frontiers), and kept a low profile.

==== The August 1964 coup ====
Meanwhile, Maj. Gen. Phoumi's powers were so diminished that he was allowed little input into the successful Operation Triangle of July 1964. However, Phoumi evaded the agreement that ended the 18 April coup, which deprived him of troops to command. He still led a full-strength training battalion in the capital, as well as the cadre for a second, and had a couple of "economic battalions" of RLA veterans at his disposal stationed at Thakhek and Pakse. On 4 August 1964, Phoumi unleashed his training battalion in a new coup attempt. The trainees erected roadblocks throughout Vientiane, but they were promptly crushed by Kouprasith's troops as Siho's DNC sat out the fight.

In December 1964, Brig. Gen. Siho detained the socially prominent editor of a Vientiane newspaper, sparking widespread outrage from the military. The DNC and the Royal Lao Army were poised for an armed clash. However, King Sisavang Vatthana was coincidentally in town, and interceded to defuse the situation.

=== Disbandement ===
On 1 February 1965 the DNC, which had held de facto control over Vientiane during the previous year, was defeated in yet another coup d'état led by Maj. Gen. Kouprasith, who adroitly kept Brig. Gen. Siho from committing the Border Police to action. Despite their non-participation in any of the January 1965 coup activities, a company of BS 33 guarding the Border Police headquarters at Muong Phene was overrun by RLA regular troops supported by M24 Chaffee light tanks, M8 Greyhound light armored cars, and M116 75mm pack field howitzers, and dispersed on 3 February 1965. The other two Border Police battalions – BS 11 and BS 99 – remained entrenched at their camp in Phou Khao Khouay outside Vientiane and initially refused to surrender. Meanwhile, the DNC's General Headquarters and training depot complex at Phone Kheng was destroyed by tank and artillery fire, being subsequently demolished to make way for the new FAR Headquarters building.

A subsequent ground assault upon the Phou Khao Khouay camp went unresisted, and with the exception of a single company from BS 11, these two battalions were arrested and disarmed. However, the following day, the two remaining companies of BS 33 made a futile raid upon the capital, only to be cornered and subdued. Meanwhile, Brig. Gen. Siho crossed the Mekong River to exile in Thailand; his DNC 'empire' was quickly divided and its units were disbanded: the military intelligence, psychological warfare, and military police personnel were returned to the RLA structure whilst some of the policemen were kept in service and renamed the National Police Corps, which was re-assigned to the Ministry of the Interior of the Royal Lao Government. After two days of negotiations, the three former Border Police Battalions and their commander, Lt. Col. Thao Ty agreed to lay down their arms with the option of transferring to the RLA's airborne forces command. By mid-year they had been moved to Seno, near Savannakhet, and consolidated into a new parachute regiment, Airborne Mobile Group 21 (Groupement Mobile 21 Aeroportée – GM 21) under Thao Ty's command.

== Structure and organization ==
By early April 1964, DNC's total strength peaked at 6,500 officers and enlisted men; GMS members were all airborne-qualified volunteers, organized into three special battalions, BS 33, BS 11, and BS 99. Each battalion comprised one headquarters (HQ), three company HQ sections, and three commando companies. The DNC's Command Staff was headquartered at Phone Kheng in the north-eastern outskirts of Vientiane, whilst the GMS was initially based in Ban Y Lai, north of Vientiane, but after becoming Border Police its headquarters was moved to Muong Phene, also in the outskirts of the capital city. With exception of a single company tasked of guarding the unit's own HQ, its three paratrooper battalions were permanently based at Phou Khao Khouay, a military camp located 22 kilometers (13.67 miles) north of the capital.

== List of GMS and DNC commanders ==
- Brigadier general Siho Lamphouthacoul (1960-1963)
- Lieutenant colonel Thao Ty (1963-1965)

== Weapons and equipment ==
The DNC was lightly armed by military standards, but heavily equipped by conventional police standards, being well-provided with U.S. small-arms. Its weaponry was surplus World War II-vintage – the standard issue weapon was the M2 carbine, complemented by semi-automatic rifles, submachine guns, and light and medium machine guns. GMS paratrooper companies had no crew-served weapons such as mortars or any other indirect fire weapons systems.

- United States M1917 revolver
- United States Smith & Wesson Model 10 Revolver
- United States Smith & Wesson SW2 Bodyguard .38 Special snub-nose revolver
- United States Colt Cobra .38 Special snub-nose revolver
- United States Colt.45 M1911A1 Pistol
- United States Smith & Wesson Model 39 Pistol
- United States M1A1 Thompson submachine gun
- United States M3A1 Grease Gun
- United States M2 Carbine
- United States M1 Garand rifle
- United States M1918A2 BAR light machine gun
- United States Browning M1919A4 .30 Cal medium machine gun
- United States Browning M1919A6 .30 Cal light machine gun

== Uniforms and insignia ==
Initially, DNC paratroopers wore dark blue fatigues, whose cut followed closely that of the U.S. Army OG-107 jungle utilities, to distinguish them from the rest of the Royal Lao Armed Forces (FAR). Early service headgear consisted on a badgeless black beret worn American-style, pulled to the right – in contrast to the FAR, where berets were still being worn pulled to the left in typical French fashion – reflecting the influence of the training cadres received from the Thai PARU in 1962; in the field, the beret was often replaced by a U.S. M-1C jump helmet. Regulation footwear were the calf-length French M1950 or M1950/53 TAP (Bottes de saut modéle 1950 et 1950/53) black leather jump-boot models and the U.S. Army M-1962 "McNamara" black leather combat boots. Web gear was a mix of U.S. M-1945 and M-1956 load-carrying equipments (LCE), respectively in khaki and olive green cotton canvas and standard issue in the FAR.

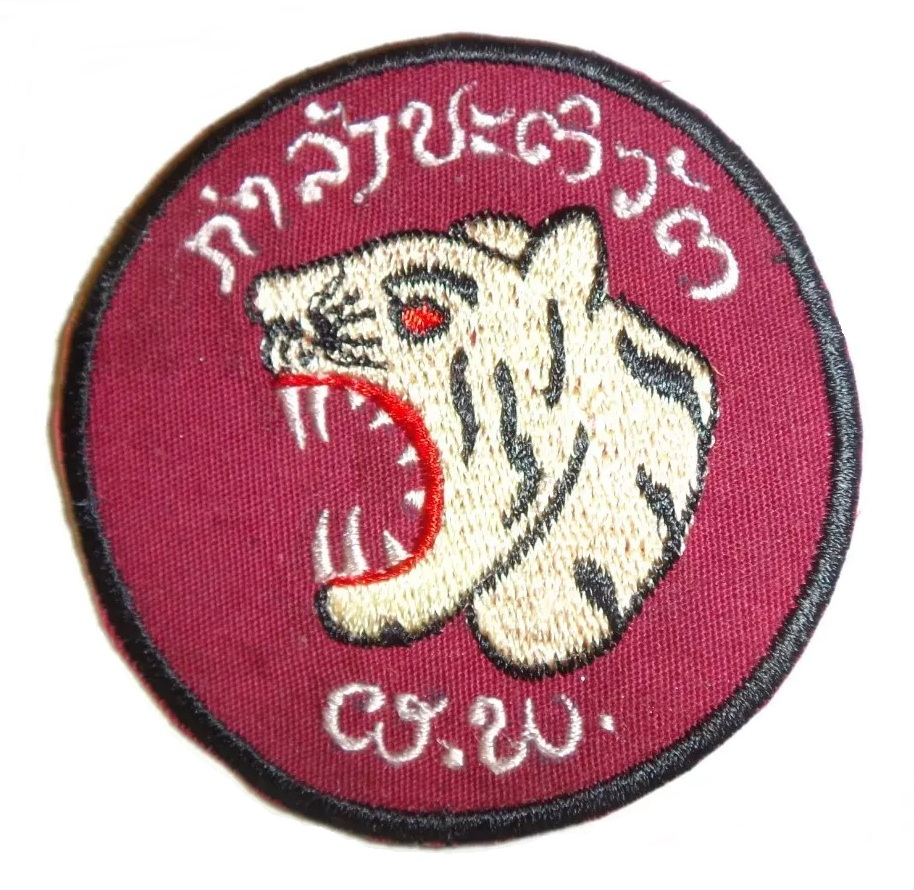
DNC Revolutionary Forces patch 1961-65.

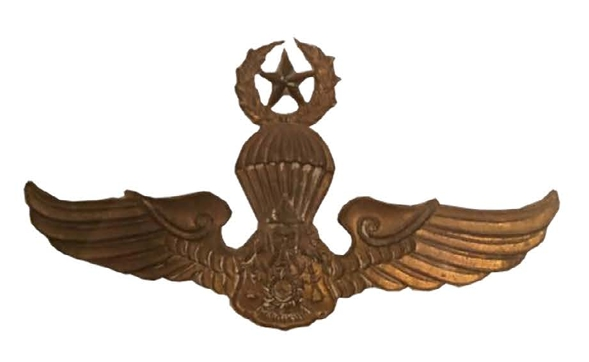
Royal Lao DNC gold parachute wings, master class, awarded after 60 jumps 1962-65

Although the DNC adopted in 1960-61 a gilt metal cap badge, the GMS never developed a distinctive unit insignia nor a beret badge, and even rank insignia was seldom seen on uniforms; a commemorative embroidered red round patch edged black bearing a snarling tiger's head surmounted by the Laotian inscription "Revolutionary Forces" (Lao language: ກຳ ລັງປະຕິວັດ | kam lang pativad), which celebrated Siho's recapture of Vientiane in 1960, was worn on the left shoulder. In 1962 the DNC adopted a distinctive set of gold parachute wings in three classes modelled after the PARU airborne qualification badge, which were worn above the right pocket of the fatigue shirt.

== See also ==
- Air America (airline)
- Commando Raider Teams
- Laotian Civil War
- List of weapons of the Laotian Civil War
- Military Region 5 Commandos
- Pathet Lao
- Project Unity (Laos)
- Republic of Vietnam National Police Field Force
- Royal Lao Armed Forces
- Royal Lao Army Airborne
- Royal Lao Police
- Royal Thai Police Aerial Reinforcement Unit (PARU)
- SPECOM
- Special Guerrilla Units (SGU)
- Vietnam War
- 1967 Opium War
