= 1965 Laotian coups =

- Part of Laotian Civil War, Vietnam War
Date	Phoumi's coup: January 27, 1965–February 4, 1965; Bounleut's coup: 31 January 1965
Location	Phoumi's coup: Kingdom of Laos, between Paksan and Vientiane; also within Viantiane; Bounleut's coup: Vientiane
Result	Phoumi Nosavan's coup suppressed by Kouprasith Abhay. Bounleut Saycocie's coup makes peace with Kouprasith Abhay and he and his forces re-join Mobile Group 17. Kouprasith preemptively attacks forces of Siho Lamphouthacoul. Phoumi's villa looted. Subsequent unrest is also suppressed, Phoumi and Siho exiled to Thailand.

Belligerents
(Kingdom of Laos) Supporters of Phoumi	Kingdom of Laos	(Kingdom of Laos) Supporters of Bounleut (Kingdom of Laos) Directorate of National Coordination

Commanders and leaders
Phoumi Nosovan	Koprasith Abhay (United States) William H. Sullivan	Bounleut Saycocie Siho Lamphouthacoul

Units involved
Battalion of Volunteers 22; Two companies of Battalion of Infantry 13	Mobile Group 17; Police forces Volunteer Battalion 52; One L-20 Beaver; Artillery	Three companies of Mobile Group 17 DNC Special Battalion 33; DNC Special Battalion 11; DNC Special Battalion 99

The 1965 Laotian coups were two separate and simultaneous coups that struck the Kingdom of Laos in January 1965. General Phoumi Nosavan, a participant in four prior coups, had been deprived of troop command as a result; nevertheless, he managed to come up with troops for another try at overthrowing the Royal Lao Government. Simultaneously, Colonel Bounleut Saycocie independently mounted his own coup; after a short term takeover of Vientiane's radio station and infrastructure, he and his coup troops would rejoin the government forces sent to attack them. General Kouprasith Abhay, the military region commander, suppressed both coups. After re-acquiring Bounleut's troops, Kouprasith turned on the national police force and its commander, Siho Lamphouthacoul, as he felt they were untrustworthy and likely to join Phoumi's coup. The police force was defeated and disbanded. The troops Phoumi counted on never reached Vientiane; they were defeated and dispersed. By 4 February 1965, both coups were defeated. A purge of suspected dissident officers from the Lao officer corps followed.

An insurrection was threatened in Thakhek on 26 March 1965, but was quelled bloodlessly. The mutinous units' officers' ranks were purged of insurgents, who exiled themselves to nearby Thailand. Three weeks later, Phoumi's defeated coup troops once again threatened to stage a coup. Kouprasith sent a regiment to overcome this battalion. About two-thirds of its troops deserted; its commanding officer was executed. Both Phoumi and Siho ended their careers in exile in Thailand.

== Overview ==
French colonial policy in their Protectorate of Laos was based on a minimal French administration imposed upon the local culture. The French apparat in Laos was the smallest in French Indochina. In 1907, the French decided that two or three years education would suffice for the average Laotian citizen. Only a scanty lowland Lao urban elite received a better education, usually at Vientiane's Pavie Lycee by French instructors. By the time the Kingdom of Laos became independent, there were too few Lao with civil administrative training to run the government.

The French-run military did no better. Only an estimated five percent of Lao soldiers had three or more years of education; 90 percent were illiterate. Colonial policy was to have French officers command the Lao army units; a few Lao officers would be entrusted with the command of a company. These Lao junior officers came from the urban elite. In the wake of the departure of French officers in 1954 after Lao independence, these few junior officers suddenly rose in rank and responsibilities, becoming field grade officers. Lao sergeants and corporals were promoted to company commands as officers. At the top of the rank structure, generals were commissioned into the army from civilian life, with no military experience. From the beginning, the Royal Lao Army was not allegiant to either the Lao constitution, or to the RLA. Instead, Lao troops showed loyalty toward whichever senior Lao officer they already knew. It was an army utterly without esprit de corps .

== Background ==
On 25 December 1959, Captain Kong Le and his paratroopers bloodlessly seized the Royal Lao Government in Vientiane, and installed General Phoumi Nosavan in power. Kong Le displaced Phoumi with a coup on 10 August 1960, only to have control of Laos revert to Phoumi in the Battle of Vientiane on 16 December 1960.

On 18 April 1964, Phoumi would be surprised by another coup, staged by Siho Lamphouthacoul and his Directorate of National Coordination police. Phoumi was sidelined throughout this coup. Nevertheless, after the coup was quashed, Phoumi lost his Defense Minister's post in the RLG, as well as any troops to command. However, Phoumi still had access to a training battalion stationed outside Vientiane; on 4 August 1964, he ordered them into an attempted coup. This putsch was quelled by troops commanded by Kouprasith Abhay, and the training battalion disbanded.

== Phoumi's coup ==
On 24 January 1965, an electrical malfunction caused a disastrous chain reaction accident that destroyed nine T-28 Trojan bombers at Wattay Airfield outside Vientiane. Taking advantage of the distractions caused by such a serious loss to the government, on 27 January 1965, Phoumi managed to inveigle the dispatch of Military Region 2 troops south from the Plain of Jars to counter a purposed attack on Vientiane by the local troops of Military Region 5. The contingent moving from MR 2 consisted of Battalion Voluntaries 22 (Battalion of Volunteers 22), as well as two companies of Battalion Infanterie 13 (Battalion of Infantry 13) moving in from Paksan.

== Bounleut's coup ==
On 31 January 1965, Colonel Bounleut Saycocie also decided on a coup. While unaware of Phoumi's efforts, Bounleut led three companies from the Groupement Mobile 17 (Mobile Group 17) regiment as they occupied Vientiane's radio station and other critical points. The coup was largely bloodless. Five announcements were aired on the radio station. There were now two separate coups being staged independently and simultaneously.

Unfortunately for Bounleut, U.S. Ambassador William H. Sullivan had the radio station taken off the air. Sullivan had convinced a drunken Australian technician to sever the station's connection to its antenna to quiet it. Bounleut's ploy of broadcasting phony news of support for his coup was foiled.

== Reaction to the coups ==
It was MR 5 commander Kouprasith's duty to crush the coups. He turned out the remaining companies of GM 17, garbed them with identifying orange scarves, and sent them out to quell the insurrection. Bounleut and his coup force promptly donned orange scarves and rejoined their regiment. Elsewhere, on 1 February 1965, police were posted on guard at Phone Kheng prison.

Meanwhile, Phoumi was in his house in Vientiane, awaiting his promised troops. He also hoped that his protege Siho would bring his DNC police to his aid. However, Siho abstained from any action other than the posted guards. Elsewhere, the inbound troops for Phoumi's coup were still en route from Paksan to Vientiane. Though the companies from BI 13 turned back, BV 22 pressed on to attack the docks on the Mekong River outside of Vientiane before withdrawing some 47 kilometers to a defensive position.

At 1300 hours on 3 February 1965, Kouprasith's artillery blasted Phone Kheng. His armored force moved in. By sundown, the commando company of police belonging to Bataillon Special 33 (Special Battalion 33) fled the flaming jail. They changed out of their uniforms and melted into the populace. From there, the anti-coup forces went 22 kilometers out of town to surround the DNC headquarters. With the exception of one escapee company, DNC Bataillon Special 11 (Special Battalion 11) and DNC Bataillon Special 99 (Special Battalion 99) were arrested without incident.

Siho now ordered his two remaining companies of police commandos to ambush Route 151 in and around Ban Nava. After Kouprasith's Bataillon Volontaires 52 (Volunteer Battalion 52) failed to dislodge the DNC troops, he called for air strikes on the police. General Thao Ma, who headed the Royal Lao Air Force, managed to deflect the request. Kouprasith then commandeered an RLAF L-20 Beaver, mounted a .50 caliber machine gun in its door, and directed it to attack the DNC ambush. Though inaccurate, the improvised air strike terrified the police into surrender to troops of Bataillon Volontaires 53 (Volunteer Battalion 53) and GM 17.

With that done, Kouprasith turned to Phoumi's coup forces. He attacked them with artillery fire and an air raid from the Beaver. BV 22 dispersed north from Paksan. By 4 February, the DNC police were temporarily locked in a cigarette factory, then disbanded. Phoumi's villa was looted. Phoumi and Siho fled into exile in Thailand.

== Settling accounts ==
Two Phoumi loyalist generals were purged from command. Also, the major general who had forwarded the MR 2 troops was jailed for a year, and his command passed to General Vang Pao on 28 February 1965.

On 26 March, radio broadcasts from troops in Thakhek denounced the Vientiane government. Two regiments and two battalions were stationed there. On the 28th, the Royal Lao Army General Staff sent two regiments and a battalion southward to counter the perceived threat. The potential dissidents quietly acquiesced in a purge of their officers' ranks, with most of the officers exiling themselves across the Thai border.

Towards the end of April, there was another threat to the RLG. BV 22 was still lurking near Paksan; they had been joined by Bataillon Regional 290 (Regional Battalion 290). Once again, GM 17 was called upon to crush dissent. BR 290 surrendered; its commander fled to Thailand. The commander of BV 22 was executed while trying to surrender. BV 22 suffered massive desertions, as 360 of its men fled, leaving only 153 soldiers in the battalion. A garrison was selected from GM 17 and posted in Paksan.

== Aftermath ==
Phoumi and Siho fled into exile in Thailand. It was the end of both generals' careers. Kouprasith Abhay maintained his grip on Military Region 5 and the capital of Laos. Ouane Rattikone remained Chief of Staff for the Royal Lao Army. Subordinates were dispatched to Savannakhet to take charge of any RLA units that might still be loyal to Phoumi.

As the elite families settled scores behind the scenes, some of the best junior officers in the RLA were jailed, murdered, or otherwise purged, further weakening the Lao military.
