= Sing Rattanasamai =

Laotian Army general

- Born: 1912
- Died: 1973 (aged 60–61)
- Military career
- Allegiance: Kingdom of Laos
- Branch: Royal Lao Army
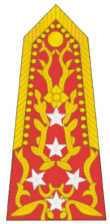
- Rank: General
- Conflicts: World War II; First Indochina War; Laotian Civil War

General Sing Rattanasamay (1912–1973) was a Laotian senior military officer, being one of the co-founders of the Laotian National Army (French: Armée Nationale Laotiènne – ANL), the predecessor of the Royal Lao Army (RLA) during the First Indochina War and the Laotian Civil War. Initially a colonial police officer, Sing joined both the anti-Japanese resistance network during World War II, and the anti-French Lao Issara nationalist guerrilla movement from 1946 to 1949. He subsequently joined the ranks of the nascent ANL, and went on to serve the Kingdom of Laos until just prior to his death in 1973.

== Background ==
The colonial Laotian military forces of the French Protectorate of Laos were composed of Laotian peasant recruits led mostly by French officers and non-commissioned officers, with those few Laotians promoted out of the ranks rose no further than the command of a company. After the Kingdom of Laos gained its independence on October 1953, a small group of Laotian officers with military experience were speedily promoted to much higher command positions than they were accustomed to. Many officers were also commissioned into the upper ranks directly from civilian life; they tended to gain their posts through family or political connections rather than any training or ability. The few aristocratic families who dominated Laotian society felt it advantageous to have family members or friends in the upper echelons of military command.

== Early life and colonial service ==
Sing Rattanasamay was born in 1912 at Vientiane, in the French Protectorate of Laos, where he received his education. He began his career as a non-commissioned officer (NCO) serving in the colonial "Indochinese Guard" (French: Garde Indochinoise), the Gendarmerie force of the French Protectorate of Laos prior to World War II. In October 1945, Sing joined the Lao Issara independence movement and was given command of the newly-established Civil Guard in Vientiane, being subsequently appointed as the first Lao Issara defense minister by Prince Phetsarath. However, Prince Souphanouvong claimed for himself the post of commander-in-chief of the Lao Issara's military wing, the Army for the Liberation and Defense of Laos (ALDL), a move that drove him into conflict with Sing. In November 1945, Sing was wounded in action on the Plain of Jars and sidelined to convalesce. Dissension within the Lao Issara's leadership led to Sing's dismissal in November 1948, forcing him into exile in Thailand. After the Lao Issara leadership disbanded its ALDL guerrilla forces and an amnesty was declared for their members in October 1949, Sing returned to Laos and joined the French-run Laotian National Army (French: Armée Nationale Laotiènne – ANL), which enabled him to resume his own military career. In the spring of 1953, Captain Sing became the first Laotian officer to be given the command of a ANL infantry battalion. Upon the departure of all French officers from the ANL and their replacement by Laotian officers, Major Sing was then promoted to the post of commander of Military Region 3 (MR 3) in early 1955.

== Service in the Kingdom of Laos ==
His participation in the early stages of the Laotian Civil War remains obscure. However, when General Phoumi Nosavan took control of the country in the wake of the coup d'état of December 1959 in Vientiane, Sing was amongst the Laotian Generals that backed him. When Captain Kong Le seized the capital during his coup, Sing also declared his support, though what role he played in Phoumi's subsequent counter-coup in December 1960 is still unclear.

On 5 May 1961, Sing was appointed as head of a government delegation sent to negotiate a ceasefire with the Pathet Lao communist guerrilla movement. In a meeting that took place at Ban Namone, located between Vientiane and the Plain of Jars, it was agreed that the International Control Commission (ICC) established by the 1954 Geneva accords would be revived to monitor the truce. By 4 May, the ICC had arrived to Laos and during the ceasefire, representatives from the Royal Lao Government, the Pathet Lao, and Kong Le's Neutralist Armed Forces (French: Forces Armèes Neutralistes – FAN) would meet to negotiate the terms regarding the formation of a tripartite coalition government.

In 1970, Sing was promoted to general, and appointed as a military adviser to the Royal Lao Government. In 1973, he retired shortly before his death.

== See also ==
- First Indochina War
- Royal Lao Armed Forces
- Royal Lao Army
- Royal Lao Police
- Laotian Civil War
