= 1964 Laotian coups =

Two attempted coup d'etats against the Royal Lao Government

- Part of Laotian Civil War, Vietnam War
Date	18 April 1964 – 23 April 1964; 4 August 1964
Location	Vientiane, Kingdom of Laos
Result	Both coups fail. After the first coup, the Pathet Lao form a short-lived coalition with the Neutralists. North Vietnamese forces continue to use the Ho Chi Minh Trail.

The 1964 Laotian coups were two attempted coup d'etats against the Royal Lao Government. The 18 April 1964 coup was notable for being committed by the policemen of the Directorate of National Coordination. Although successful, it was overturned five days later by U.S. Ambassador Leonard Unger. In its wake, Neutralist Prime Minister Souvanna Phouma forged a fragile coalition with the Pathet Lao communists. On 4 August 1964, Defense Minister Phoumi Nosavan attempted to take over Vientiane with a training battalion. This coup was quickly crushed by the local Royal Lao Army troops, as the police sat out the conflict.

The Pathet Lao left the coalition and repudiated Souvanna Phouma. Perforce he was driven to cooperate with the rightist Royalist politicians and military officers. None of the events affected the North Vietnamese usage of the Ho Chi Minh Trail to send troops into battle in South Vietnam.

== Overview ==
The United States began bankrolling France's First Indochina War in 1950. Charles Yost, the first U.S. ambassador to Laos took up his duties in September 1954. Four months after he arrived, the U.S. Operations Mission (USOM) set up shop. When USOM proved unable to track U.S. military aid, the Programs Evaluation Office was established in December 1955. Despite Yost's best efforts to curb the activities of the CIA and the anti-Communist stance of the Eisenhower administration, the American mission would continue to increasingly involve itself with both political and military operations within Laos. The U.S., which did not sign the Final Declaration, issued its own declaration making it easier for Eisenhower to state that the US would not be governed by agreements made at the 1954 Geneva Conference.

== Background ==
General Siho Lamphouthacoul used his powers as the National Director of Coordination to build Laotian police forces into a national power. Siho gathered and trained two special battalions of paramilitary police during the latter part of 1960, dubbing them the Directorate of National Coordination. Siho's new battalions helped carry the day at the Battle of Vientiane, when General Phoumi Nosavan seized power in December 1960. Acquiring the National Police from the Ministry of the Interior, and co-opting local military police, Siho consolidated the Lao police into the DNC. Attaining a strength of 6,500 men, the DNC would be Siho's instrument for power.

By March 1964, the Vietnamese communists had begun forwarding combat units down the Ho Chi Minh Trail. The increased activity in the southern Laotian panhandle threatened the neutrality of the Kingdom of Laos, as well as the very existence of South Vietnam. In mid-month, Lao Defense Minister Phoumi Nosavan flew to Dalat, Vietnam to confer with South Vietnamese senior officers. They agreed that the South Vietnamese could attack the Trail on Laotian territory with entire regiments and with air strikes. When Prime Minister Souvanna Phouma learned of the agreement that had been struck without his knowledge, he scaled back the South Vietnamese operations to forays by reconnaissance teams, with a hidden South Vietnamese liaison operating from Savannakhet, Laos.

== Siho's coup ==
Siho's coup
- Part of 1964 Laotian coups
Date	18 April 1964—23 April 1964
Location	Vientiane, Laos
Result	Siho and Kouprasith temporarily seize control of the government. Subsequently ousted by the United States Embassy. The Neutralist government forms a coalition with the Pathet Lao, this coalition then dissolves. Phoumi Nosavan removed from his post as Defense Minister.
Territorial changes	Pathet Lao forces occupy some northern portions of the Plain of Jars

Belligerents
Directorate of National Coordination (Kingdom of Laos) Royal Lao Army	Forces Armées Neutralistes (Kingdom of Laos) Royal Lao Army (France) French Embassy; United States

Commanders and leaders
Siho Lamphouthacoul; Kouprasith Abhay	Souvanna Phouma (United States) Leonard Unger (United States) William P. Bundy; Amka Soukhavong

Units involved
Special Battalion 33; Special Battalion 11 (Kingdom of Laos) Two battalions from Mobile Group 17	31 officials

On 18 April 1964, Prime Minister Souvanna Phouma met with his brother Souphanouvong, leader of the Lao communists, on the Plain of Jars. The Pathet Lao demanded demilitarization of both Luang Prabang and Vientiane as the price of their participation in a national government. This discouraged Souvanna Phouma, who returned to Vientiane, having decided to resign as Prime Minister. However, King Sisavang Vatthana would not approve the resignation until the next day.

At this turn of events, Siho Lamphouthacoul inveigled Kouprasith Abhay into a coup, on the grounds that the United States would be forced by events to accept their new government. Beginning at 2200 hours on the night of 18/19 April 1964, Siho's police unit Bataillon Special 33 (Special Battalion 33) seized Vientiane's infrastructure. Minister of Defense Phoumi Nosavan was contacted at 0415 hours; he declined to join the coup. By 0430, another DNC unit, Bataillon Special 11 (Special Battalion 11) had arrested Souvanna Phouma and 15 leading officials of such opposed factions as the Royal Lao Army, Forces Army Neutraliste, and the French Embassy. The coup force emptied the safe in FAN's headquarters and looted Kong Le's home. Some 15 other FAN officials sought asylum from the coup in the Soviet Embassy. The Royal Lao Air Force was placed on alert, with its pilots bedded down in tents on the flight line.

Kouprasith was chosen as the successor to power, with Siho his deputy. To strengthen his hold on the country, Kouprasith called in two battalions of his Groupement Mobile 17 (Mobile Group 17) from Military Region 2 to reinforce the DNC personnel. Communist forces promptly moved into the defensive positions strung along the north edge of the Plain of Jars that had been abandoned by GM 17.

The coup had been staged in the absence of American ambassador Leonard Unger, who was in Saigon conferring with Secretary of State Dean Rusk, Ambassador to South Vietnam Henry Cabot Lodge, and Assistant Secretary for State for Far Eastern Affairs William P. Bundy. American ambassador Leonard Unger hastily returned from his conference on 23 April, accompanied by Bundy. Unger confronted Siho and Kouprasith and informed them that the United States supported Souvanna Phouma and the International Agreement on the Neutrality of Laos of 23 July 1962. Unger noted that the two mutinous officers reacted like frightened schoolboys. Bundy thought they were desperate to save face. Unger ordered Siho and Kouprasith to release their captives while announcing they had taken Souvanna Phouma into custody to secure the national government. In a face saving gesture, they did so. Unger's orders had ended the abortive coup.

Even before the mutineers could act, Unger and Bundy visited Phoumi. He promised them the release of Souvanna Phouma, Amka Soukhavong, and the other neutralists. Once they were released the following day, Souvanna Phouma returned to negotiations for a coalition government. He succeeded, but had to agree to fill vacant communist seats in the Royal Lao Government. The Prime Minister, under pressure from the rightists, did not fill the Pathet Lao slots in the government. Despite the political pressure, Souvanna Phouma replaced Phoumi as Defense Minister. No sooner was Phoumi stripped of power than Siho and Kouprasith wanted in on his gambling rackets, and his opium and gold smuggling operations. Meanwhile, on 3 June, Souphanouvong announced that the Pathet Lao no longer recognized Souvanna as Prime Minister; this effectively ended their participation in the coalition.

== Phoumi's coup ==
Phoumi's coup
- Part of 1964 Laotian coups
Date	4 August 1964
Location	Vientiane, Laos
Result	Coup fails. Major Boua imprisoned. Training battalions led by Phoumi Nosavan dissolved, leaving Phoumi without a command. Souvanna Phouma abandons the Neutralists and allies with right-wing political factions.

Belligerents
(Kingdom of Laos) Supporters of Phoumi	(Kingdom of Laos) Royal Lao Army

Commanders and leaders
Phoumi Nosavan; Boua	Kouprasith Abhay

Units involved
One training battalion	Kouprasith's forces

In the wake of the April 1964 coup, Kouprasith emerged as Deputy Commander in Chief of the RLA. His ally Ouane Rattikone was the Commander in Chief. However, Siho was not only outranked, but drew international criticism for his coup. In response, he retitled the DNC as Lao National Police, and laid low. In the meantime, Phoumi's powers were so diminished that he was allowed little input into the successful July 1964 Operation Triangle Kouprasith headed. However, Phoumi evaded the agreement that ended the April coup, which deprived him of troops to command. He still led a full-strength training battalion in the capital, as well as the cadre for a second, and had a couple of "economic battalions" of military veterans at his disposal in Thakhek and Pakxe. On 4 August 1964, Phoumi loosed his training battalion in a coup. Led by Phoumi's bodyguard, Major Boua, the trainees erected roadblocks throughout Vientiane. They were promptly crushed by Kouprasith's troops as Siho's police sat out the fight. Major Boua went to jail. The training battalions were disbanded. Phoumi was left without troops to command.

== Aftermath ==
The result of the 1964 coups was the de-neutralization of Souvanna Phouma. Having been forced by circumstance to side with the rightwing politicians who held him in power, he would be opposed to the communists for the remainder of the Laotian Civil War.

The Ho Chi Minh Trail would continue to be a conduit to South Vietnam for communist troops and materiel.

== See also ==
- 1960 Laotian coups
- 1966 Laotian coup
- 1973 Laotian coup
