= Siho Lamphouthacoul =

Laotian Army general

- Born: 1934
- Died: 1966 (aged 31–32)
- Military career
- Allegiance: Kingdom of Laos
- Branch: Royal Lao Army; Royal Lao Police
- Service years: 1953–1965
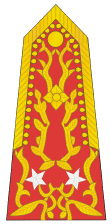
- Rank: Brigadier general
- Commands: Directorate of National Coordination
- Conflicts: First Indochina War; Laotian Civil War

Brigadier general Siho Lamphouthacoul (Lao: ສີໂຫ ລຳພຸທທະກຸລ, 1934 – September 1966) was a Laotian military and police officer. He used his powers as the National Director of Coordination to build Laotian police forces into a national power. Appointed as Director prior to the August 1960 coup by Kong Le, Siho gathered and trained two special battalions of paramilitary police during the latter part of 1960. When his patron, General Phoumi Nosavan, seized power in December 1960, Siho's new battalions helped carry the day at the Battle of Vientiane. Acquiring the National Police from the Ministry of the Interior, and co-opting local military police, Siho consolidated the Lao police into the Directorate of National Coordination. Attaining a strength of 6,500 men, the DNC would be Siho's instrument for his short-lived 18 April 1964 coup.

Having failed once in his attempt to take over the Kingdom of Laos, Siho sat out from the 1965 Laotian coups. Nevertheless, the Royal Lao Army would attack and dismantle the Directorate of Coordination on 3 February 1965, driving Siho into exile in Thailand. In June 1966, he believed it safe to return to Laos and surrender. Three months later, he was shot while trying to escape.

== Rise to command ==
Brigadier general Siho Lanphouthacoul was born on Khong Island, in the French Protectorate of Laos. He was of Chinese-Lao heritage. His family served in the aristocratic household of the Abhay family. The eldest son, Kouprasith Abhay, was eight years older than Siho, and they were reared together. As a result, for unknown reasons, Siho grew up resenting Abhay. Siho would come to be characterized as "rough", "tenacious", "vain", and subject to sudden outbursts of temper.

In September 1953, Siho joined the French-led Lao National Army (French: Armée Nationale Laotiénne - ANL) as a member of its first reserve officer training class. He became a protege of Phoumi Nosavan. Siho served as Phoumi's aide during a year's training in France. In 1958, Siho was selected by Phoumi as his intelligence officer as well as his aide. Phoumi also appointed him as Director of National Coordination. On 25 December 1959, General Phoumi ascended to control of the Kingdom of Laos.

During the April 1960 national elections, Captain Siho blatantly rigged election results in front of the CIA case officer Stuart Methven; Siho asked Methven's birth year, then wrote it in as a pro-government vote tally. Captain Kong Le's coup later that year in August of that year seems not to have curtailed Siho's power; he raised two special counterinsurgency battalions within the Royal Lao Police (French: Police Royale Laotiénne - PRL), trained to military standards, Through Siho's influence, they were the first unit in the PRL and Royal Lao Armed Forces (French: Forces Armées du Royaume - FAR) to be completely armed with the U.S. automatic M-2 carbine. However, the unit was reputedly corrupt in their police duties.

Siho conspired in Phoumi's return to power. On 17 November 1960, while acting as Phoumi's intelligence officer, he contacted a U.S. Special Forces unit, Team Ipsen. Four river gunboats of the Royal Lao Navy (French: Marine Royale Laotiénne - MRL) were blocking the Mekong River at Ban Sot to bar Phoumi's northward movement from Savannakhet. On 19 November, Siho and Team Ipsen set up an ambush for the MRL gunboats. However, before the boats could show up to spring it, Phoumi launched his counter-coup. Siho and his special battalions were loaded onto MRL landing crafts in Savannakhet on 21 November to join the latest coup. When Phoumi's forces finally reached the Laotian capital at Vientiane, Siho and his policemen led the attack. On the final day of the Battle of Vientiane, December 16, Siho's police unit successfully captured the Royal Lao Air Force (RLAF) military runway at Wattay Airfield.

After Phoumi's coup succeeded, Siho consolidated the Royal Lao Army (RLA) military police and the PRL national police into his Directorate of National Coordination (DNC) Security Agency during March 1961. His actions cost him police funding from the U.S.; however, the DNC were considered the most effective combat troops in the FAR. The resulting 1st Special Mobile Group (French: Groupement Mobile Special 1 - GMS 1) was an airborne-qualified unit. They were soon put to test, as in April 1961, when they were moved north to prevent Kong Le's Neutralist Armed Forces (French: Forces Armées Neutralistes - FAN) and the Pathet Lao communists from moving down from the Plain of Jars and recapturing Vientiane. On 25 April, they were deployed on the southern bank of the Lik River (Lao language: Nam Lik), successfully blocking the only road available, Route 13.

Tiao Ekarath had led another of the countercoup units, Mobile Group B (French: Groupement Mobile B - GM B) in restoring Phoumi to power, and was a rival to Siho for Phoumi's favor. On 10 May 1961, Tiao Ekarath's body was discovered in an abandoned vehicle near Wattay Airfield. He had been shot in the head. Siho was widely blamed for the death.

On 5 November 1961, Siho's DNC personnel arrested a FAN intelligence officer who was on business in Vientiane. The detainee was released two days later. On the 29th, a DNC unit began irregular operations near Thakhek in Military Region 3. This action was ended in December when Siho's demand for tactical control of the operation through the communications network was refused.

In 1962, Siho raised a third special battalion to bring GMS 1 to regimental size.

In 1963, he went to Taiwan for advanced staff training. While there, he came under the influence of Chiang Ching-kuo, who headed the Nationalist Chinese secret police. Siho returned from his three months training on 1 May 1963.

In February 1964, GMS 1 was tested in battle. Transported to Savannakhet in Military Region 3, they successfully assaulted the nearby Pathet Lao-occupied village of Nong Boualao, which had already repelled several assaults by the Royal Lao Army.

== Siho's grab for power ==
On 18 April 1964 there was a tripartite meeting on the Plain of Jars, as Souvanna Phouma met with his brother Souphanouvong to thrash out a coalition agreement. At this meeting, the Pathet Lao demanded the demilitarization of both Luang Prabang and Vientiane. A discouraged Souvanna Phouma returned to Vientiane, having decided to resign as Prime Minister. However, King Sisavang Vatthana would not approve the resignation until the following day.

At this, Siho inveigled Kouprasith into a coup, on the grounds that the United States would have to accept their new government. By early April 1964, the DNC consisted of 6,500 men and served variously as a civil police force, immigration service, national police, and military intelligence service. On the night of 18/19 April 1964, BS 33 seized Vientiane's infrastructure. They arrested Souvanna Phouma and 15 leading officials of several opposed factions such as the Royal Lao Army, Forces Armées Neutralistes, and the French Embassy. The coup force emptied the safe in the FAN's headquarters and looted Kong Le's home. Some 15 other FAN officials sought asylum from the coup in the Soviet Embassy. Overall however, the DNC policemen were successful in their coup.

General Phoumi Nosavan, when informed of the coup in progress, declined to participate. Kouprasith Abhay was then named successor to power, with Siho his deputy. Kouprasith called in two battalions of his Mobile Group 17 (French: Groupement Mobile 17 - GM 17) to reinforce the DNC personnel. Communist forces promptly moved into the defensive positions strung along the north edge of the Plain of Jars that had been abandoned by GM 17. On 23 April, the American ambassador Leonard Unger returned from a conference in Saigon, Vietnam. He confronted Siho and the mutinous Lao officers and informed them that the United States supported Souvanna Phouma; that was the end of the coup.

== Siho's later activities ==
In December 1964, Siho seized the socially prominent editor of a Vientiane newspaper, sparking widespread outrage from the military. The DNC and the Royal Lao Army were poised for a clash. However, the King was coincidentally in town, and interceded to defuse the situation.

Siho would hold the DNC out of the January 1965 coup activity. However, despite their non-participation in any coup activities, a company of BS 33 guarding the Frontier Police headquarters at Muong Phene was overrun by RLA tanks and dispersed on 3 February 1965. A subsequent assault upon both BS 11 and BS 99 at their camp 22 kilometers outside Vientiane went unresisted. With the exception of a single company from BS 11, those two battalions were arrested and disarmed. However, the following day, the final two companies of BS 33 made a futile raid upon Vientiane, only to be cornered and subdued. Meanwhile, Siho crossed the Mekong into exile in Thailand.

In June 1966, Siho consulted a fortune teller, who assured him it was safe to return to Laos. He recrossed the Mekong to Military Region 4 to surrender. He was imprisoned for three months before being shot while trying to escape.

== See also ==
- Brigadier general Thao Ty
- Laotian Civil War
- Major general Ouane Rattikone
- Major general Phoumi Nosavan
- Major general Vang Pao
- Colonel Bounleuth Saycocie
- Royal Lao Armed Forces
- Royal Lao Army
- Royal Lao Army Airborne
- Royal Lao Police
