= Kouprasith Abhay =

Laotian military leader (1926 - c. 1999)

Kouprasith Abhay ກຸປຣະສິທທິ໌ ອະພັຍ
- Born: 1926; Laos
- Died: c. 1999 (aged 72–73); France?
- Military career
- Allegiance: Kingdom of Laos
- Branch: Royal Lao Army
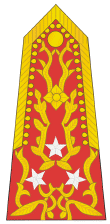
- Rank: Major general
- Nickname: Fat K
- Conflicts: Laotian Civil War
- Awards: Order of the Million Elephants and the White Parasol

Major general Kouprasith Abhay (Lao: ກຸປຣະສິທທິ໌ ອະພັຍ; 1926–1999?) was a prominent military leader of the Kingdom of Laos during the Laotian Civil War. Scion of a socially prominent family, his military career was considerably aided by their influence. In early 1960, he was appointed to command of Military Region 5, which included Laos' capital city, Vientiane. Removed from that command on 14 December for duplicitous participation in the Battle of Vientiane, he was reappointed in October 1962. He would hold the post until 1 July 1971, thus controlling the troops in and around the capital. Over the years, he would be involved in one way or another in the coups of 1960, 1964, 1965, 1966, and 1973. His service was marked by a deadly feud with another Laotian general, Thao Ma; the feud was largely responsible for the latter two coup attempts against the government.

After the Royal Lao Government fell to the communists in 1975, Kouprasith retired to exile in France.

== Rise to power ==
Kouprasith Abhay was the son of Kou Abhay. The Abhays were an aristocratic family of Chinese-Lao heritage from Khong Island, which is sited on the Mekong River near the Cambodian border in extreme southern Laos. Siho Lamphouthacoul, who was younger than Kouprasith, was raised as a protégé of the Abhay household. For unknown reasons, Siho resented this. Kouprasith Abhay was also related to the influential Sananikone family, since his own mother came from that family. Kouprasith would also marry into the Sananikone family.

Kouprasith followed Colonel Phoumi Nosavan and his aide de camp Lieutenant colonel Siho Lamphouthacoul to France, where they attended staff courses at the School of Advanced Military Studies (French: Centre des hautes études militaires) in Paris, followed by a posting as the Royal Lao Government's first military attaché to France. While in that post, Kouprasith procured two Aérospatiale Alouette II helicopters for Laos. He returned to Laos early in 1960 to take command of the Royal Lao Army (RLA) troops in Military Region 5, headquartered in Vientiane.

== In command ==
When Captain Kong Le seized power in his August 1960 coup, Kouprasith made a weak offer of support to the new satrap. He retained the command in Military Region 5, which included Vientiane. However, his sympathies actually lay with the deposed General, Phoumi Nosavan. When Phoumi's counter-coup attacked Vientiane, Kouprasith sided with him. At one point during the counter-coup, Kouprasith made his own bid for power. Though he actually held the city for a short while, and announced a regime change, he named neither Phoumi nor himself as the new head of the nation. However, a distrustful Phoumi removed Kouprasith from command of MR 5 on 14 December 1960, and subordinated him to a Phoumi loyalist. Kouprasith's cause was not aided when he took to his sick bed upon relief from the command.

During the ensuing standoff between Kouprasith and Phoumi, Kong Le and his Neutralist Armed Forces (French: Forces Armées Neutralistes – FAN) escaped to the Plain of Jars on 16 December to establish an independent neutralist faction within the Laotian Civil War. A makeshift regiment, Mobile Group Vientiane (French: Groupement Mobile Vientiane – GMV) was hastily formed to pursue Kong Le northwards up Route 13. Kouprasith was appointed to command it, and between 7 and 17 January 1961, the GMV followed the retreating FAN as far as Vang Viang. Once there, he called for air support from the Royal Lao Air Force (RLAF) before turning over his command and hastening back to the capital to safeguard his own interests. When the new GMV commander was unable to ward off counterattacks, Kouprasith was restored to his command on 27 January, and placed his troops in the south of Muang Kasi on Route 13. In his absence, on 22 April 1961, the regiment advanced northward into an ambush at Vang Viang. U.S. Special Forces (USSF) Team Moon was accompanying the move. Captain Walter Moon and Sergeant Orville Ballenger were captured, and Moon was later executed. Colonel Kouprasith helicoptered in and recovered the two surviving USSF team members.

== Neutrality beckons ==
After the International Agreement on the Neutrality of Laos had been effectuated in October 1962, Kouprasith was once again in command of Military Region 5. Although MR 5 did not saw much fighting, under his command he had a regiment of regulars, Mobile Group 17 (French: Groupement Mobile 17 – GM 17), four volunteer battalions (French: Bataillons de Voluntaires), the Directorate of National Coordination (DNC) paramilitary Security Agency and its GMS airborne-qualified regiment, and nine ADC militia companies. His foster brother, Lieutenant colonel Siho Lamphouthacoul, commanded the DNC/GMS special battalions, which was rated as the best military unit in Laos. GM 17 was also commanded by a Kouprasith protégé.

During the first half of April 1964, two Royal Lao Government missions flew to Saigon in order to secretly coordinate joint military operations in southern Laos. GM 17 was posted away from Vientiane to the Plain of Jars in MR 2. At about the same time, Siho approached Kouprasith about using the DNC Security Agency to take over the kingdom in a military coup. Kouprasith agreed, and on 18 April 1964, Siho seized the key national government buildings when he seized control of Vientiane. A new governing body, The "Revolutionary Committee of the National Army" took office, with Kouprasith as its head and Siho as deputy. Kouprasith withdrew GM 17 from the Plain of Jars to reinforce the coup, abandoning a defensive line on the Plain to the communists. On 23 April, however, U.S. Ambassador Leonard Unger intervened and ended the coup by restoring the legal government. Amid speculation about the early April missions, Kouprasith would subsequently claim to have patterned his coup after that of Nguyễn Khánh.

== Operation Triangle and the coups ==
Operation Triangle, staged in July 1964, was the first combined arms operation of the Laotian Civil War. Commanded by Kouprasith, it was a three-pronged offensive against an isolated Pathet Lao garrison at the vital road intersection of Routes 7 and 13. The Government task-force were a mixture of Royal Lao Army regulars, neutralist paratroopers, and hill tribes guerrillas, working in conjunction with a close air support effort. By 30 July, Kouprasith was victorious, as the columns converged on the objective.

On 4 August 1964, Phoumi attempted a coup using his training battalion. The trainees erected roadblocks throughout the streets of Vientiane, but they were promptly overrun by Kouprasith's troops. The training battalion was subsequently disbanded, and an antsy Phoumi was left with no troops to command.

In January 1965, the Laotian Prime-Minister Prince Souvanna Phouma convened a meeting of the RLA generals in Luang Prabang, where it made clear that he backed Kouprasith and Ouane Rattikone rather than Siho and Phoumi. Thus the latter two officers remained sidelined, with no troops being assigned to them. On 27 January, Phoumi convinced the Military Region 2 commander that the RLA units stationed in Vientiane were about to stage a coup d'état, and therefore a rescue mission was launched from MR 2. Even without any troops under his command, Phoumi was managing to attempt a coup.

On 31 January, while Phoumi's begged troops were still inbound, Colonel Bounleut Saycocie also tried his own coup by using three companies from Mobile Group 17. He was on the air long enough to broadcast five radio communiqués. In that time, Kouprasith turned out the remainder of GM 17; the dissidents promptly rejoined the ranks of the RLA as Bounleut made peace with Kouprasith. However, even though Siho was not involved in the coup, Kouprasith distrusted him. In a pre-emptive move, Kouprasith besieged the Directorate of National Coordination's Border Police (formerly known as the GMS) headquarters in Vientiane with RLA infantry units backed by armored cars, light tanks and artillery. After the assault, both the DNC and its Border Police battalions were disbanded. Kouprasith then dealt with the troops coming to Phoumi's aid, attacking and dispersing them. By 4 February, the coups were over, with Phoumi and Siho escaping to exile in Thailand, their military careers at an end. A purge of Royal Lao Army officers loyal to Phoumi or Siho followed suit – during March and April 1965 many promising young officers were either murdered, imprisoned, or forced into exile, further weakening the RLA.

== Ongoing career ==
However, one pro-Phoumi officer was too necessary to the war effort to be purged: Major general Vang Pao, the leader of the CIA-sponsored Hmong Special Guerrilla Units (SGUs) operating in northeastern Laos. The resulting poor relationship between Kouprasith and Vang Pao was worsened by a murder incident which occurred that autumn. A Hmong SGU guerrilla fighter killed a Royalist regular soldier in a fit of rage and then sought refuge at Vang Pao's villa in Vientiane. When Kouprasith's Royalist soldiers surrounded the villa, Vang Pao strongly objected. The two generals became even more estranged because of this incident until 11 November 1965, when they were finally reconciled by an intermediary.

Brigadier general Thao Ma, the commander of the Royal Lao Air Force (RLAF), was another Phoumi loyalist bereft of his support. By July 1965, Kouprasith began gossiping that Brig. Gen. Thao Ma was planning a coup. Major general Ouane Rattikone floated a scheme to split the C-47 transports and the T-28D fighter-bombers into separate contingents, allowing the RLAF commander to concentrate upon the latter. Brig. Gen. Thao Ma protested to U.S. Ambassador William H. Sullivan, claiming that the other generals wanted to seize control of the C-47 transports for their personal clandestine gold- and opium-smuggling operations, and for paid passenger services. Prince Souvanna Phouma scotched the reorganization.

On 2 April 1966, during a strategy meeting of the American Embassy staff and the Royal Lao Army's General Staff, Kouprasith and Ouane protested against Operation Barrel Roll's schedule of air strikes that allotted a large percentage of the U.S. Air Force bombing raids to the Ho Chi Minh trail in southern Laos. They wanted more air power used to support the RLA and SGU troops fighting in the Plain of Jars in northern Laos. Meanwhile, during Summer 1966, RLAF operations slowly grounded to a near standstill as Brig. Gen. Thao Ma was being pressured to move his headquarters from Seno Air Base, near Savannakhet, to the vicinity of the RLA General Staff headquarters in Vientiane, so that they could keep a close eye on his activities.

== More coups ==
Kouprasith wanted Royalist control of Kong Le's Neutralists. Some of Kong Le's subordinate officers, with the connivance of the RLA General Staff, deposed him on 17 October 1966, sending him into exile. Four days later, in a separate action, Thao Ma and Bounleut Saycocie launched an unsuccessful airborne coup against the government. After failing to kill Kouprasith with an air strike on the General Staff headquarters the Royal Lao Air Force general led ten of his T-28 fighter pilots in a flight into exile in Thailand.

On 24 November 1966, Pathet Lao troops captured government positions at Tha Thom in Military Region 2. However, since Kouprasith's MR 5 troops were closer to the scene, he flew in Royalist reinforcements while the RLAF bombed the enemy. Tha Thom was retaken on the 28th.

When the General Staff shuffled officers' assignments in July 1968, Kouprasith retained command of Military Region 5. In early March 1970, Kouprasith was charged with holding the vital Route 7/13 intersection with a four battalion force. At about the same time, the March 1970 change of government in Cambodia led to increased communist activity in the vicinity of Kouprasith's native Khong Island. By 18 July, the North Vietnamese had captured the eastern ferry landing on the mainland. The Military Region 4 commander was overwhelmed dealing with the communist offensive roaring forth from the Ho Chi Minh trail. On the 20th, Kouprasith hastily forwarded two battalions and a pair of 105 mm howitzers to defend the island. A third battalion was supplied from Military Region 3. A makeshift fourth battalion was thrown together from personnel drafted from all the MR 5 battalions; it too went to Khong Island.

Prince Sisouk na Champassak became the Defense Minister and Deputy Prime Minister in August 1970. He began to revamp the Lao military. First, he engineered the retirements of Generals Ouane and Oudone from their posts as commander and deputy commander of the RLA in March 1971. He also placed constraints on Kouprasith's command of MR 5. When the high command was reorganized on 1 July 1971, Kouprasith was transferred to administration, becoming the deputy commander in chief of the Royal Lao Army.

When Khong Island was once again threatened by the communists in October 1972, Kouprasith took charge of the relief expedition. With little opposition, he defeated the Vietnamese in three weeks.

On 20 August 1973, Thao Ma again tried to kill Kouprasith with a bombing raid. Thao Ma returned from exile in a motorized column containing 60 adherents. Once they captured Wattay Airbase, Thao Ma returned to the sky in a commandeered T-28. Thao Ma and his wingman tried to kill Kouprasith by dive bombing; they demolished Kouprasith's brick villa, killing his nephew. However, the airfield was retaken from the coup force while the air strike was in progress. When they returned, a truck-mounted machine gun manned by a government soldier brought Thao Ma down. He was hauled wounded from his crash-landed plane and taken to Kouprasith's headquarters. There Thao Ma was executed on Kouprasith's order.

== Fall from power ==
When the final Pathet Lao offensive drove through Vientiane in May 1975, Kouprasith resigned on the 11th and fled to Thailand. In October 1978, he joined the Royal Lao Government in Exile in France, but retired shortly thereafter. He reportedly died in 1999.

== See also ==
- Laotian Civil War
- Royal Lao Army Airborne
- Royal Lao Armed Forces
