= Neutralist Armed Forces =

Laotian rebel group and political movement

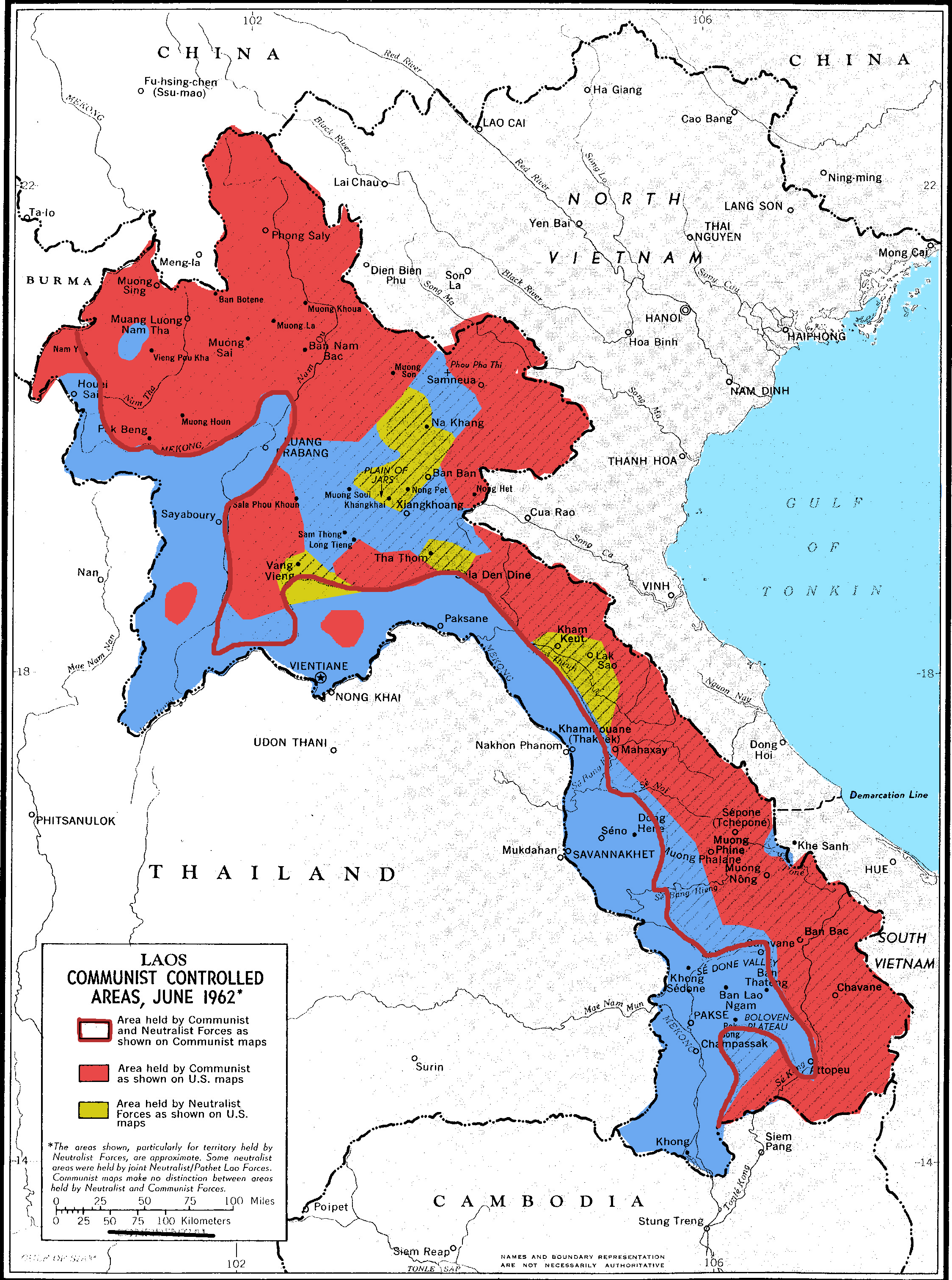
Areas under neutralist control, June 1962

The Neutralist Armed Forces (French: Forces Armées Neutralistes; FAN) were a Laotian paramilitary rebel group and independent political movement active in the Laotian Civil War. It was founded in August 1960 in the wake of the August 1960 coup, led by mutinous Laotian National Army officers of the 2nd Parachute Battalion, that overthrew the military government of Phoumi Nosavan.

The rebel movement sought to establish Laos as a neutral state that would align with neither the US nor the Soviet bloc, and would end the rampant corruption of the Royal Lao government.

Following their defeat in the Battle of Vientiane in defeat on 16 December 1960, the FAN retreated to the Plain of Jars and the following year was spent in conflict with Royalist guerrillas. During 1961, FAN grew to a strength of 8,000; it had a company of tanks and a small air arm. However, it was hampered by inadequate supplies erratically passed along by the Pathet Lao communists.

By the spring of 1963, the Neutralists began to suffer defections as its members were either defected to the Communist and Royalist side of the Laotian Civil War. As a result, Kong Le, the Neutralists leader, struck an alliance with the Royalists. In response, in April 1963, Colonel Deuane Sunnalath split off several battalions into a new party, the Patriotic Neutralists, which allied itself with the Pathet Lao. The April 1963 casualty list for FAN was 85 dead, 43 wounded. Given all the losses and defections, FAN was down to 2,200 men and 50 PT-76 light tanks by month's end.

In the subsequent years, FAN's battle performance would range from undistinguished to poor, in such battles as Lak Sao. From 1961 through 1966, it launched numerous unsuccessful attacks on the Phou Khout ridgeline positions of North Vietnamese Army (PAVN) troops overlooking FAN positions at Muang Soui. On one occasion, Kong Le assumed the robes of Buddhist monkhood while his subordinates led the assaults. Resentment grew among both his subordinates and his troops concerning his leadership, and they mutinied and forced Kong Le into exile on 16 October 1966. After his departure, the Neutralist rebels were subsumed into the Royal Lao Army and faded into inconsequentiality.

== Overview and background ==
Beginning on 23 December 1950, the United States began military aid to the French administration of the Kingdom of Laos as they fought the First Indochina War. U.S. support would increase to the point of underwriting the Lao budget in its entirety. The rationale behind the support was that it was in American interests to combat the communist insurrectionists in Laos as part of the Cold War. Banned by treaty from stationing an overt Military Assistance Advisory Group in Laos, in December 1955, the U.S. instead chose to establish a "civilian" military aid office within the U.S. embassy in Vientiane. The Programs Evaluation Office was charged with channeling war material to the Lao military.

Of the 68 ethnic minorities that comprised the Lao population, the Lao Loum numerically predominated. They dwelt along the Mekong River Valley along the southern border with the Kingdom of Thailand. The King of Laos and most of the ruling class of Laos were Lao Loum. About 20 of these influential lowland Lao families actually controlled Laos. With the PEO confined to office work, distribution of military goods took place without PEO followup. From 1955 to 1958, the U.S. would sink $202 million into Laos. This aid led to corruption as it was siphoned off by recipients.

As Bernard Fall noted from personal observation, the support of the Lao military was for political reasons and not necessarily for self-defense. The Lao soldiers were among the most highly paid in the world. They cost an average of about $1,000 apiece annually; the global average for a soldier was $848 per capita. Many Lao soldiers were fictional recruits, with their pay being siphoned off by Lao officers. Junior Lao officers afforded expensive villas. More disheartening to PEO, there were thievish Americans in the program.

The basic Laotian economy was so underdeveloped that an artificial economy developed. U.S. dollars funded imports that were sold commercially on the open market. The resultant Lao kips went to underwrite the Lao military. These payments were also subsequently turned over into foreign goods. With no controls on the imports, the quality and utility of provisions were often ignored.

Fall summarized the result by quoting a pro-American Lao officer, Sisouk na Champassak: "Black market deals in American aid dollars reached such proportions that the Pathet Lao needed no propaganda to turn the rural people against the townspeople."

The 1960 Laotian coups brought about a pivotal change of government in the Kingdom of Laos. General Phoumi Nosavan established himself as the strongman running Laos in a bloodless coup on 25 December 1959. He would be himself overthrown on 10 August 1960 by the young paratrooper captain who had backed him in the 1959 coup. When Captain Kong Le impressed the American officials underwriting Laos as a potential communist, they backed Phoumi's return to power in November and December 1960. In turn, the USSR backed Kong Le as their proxy in this cold war standoff. After the Battle of Vientiane ended in his defeat, Kong Le withdrew his paratroopers northward to the strategic Plain of Jars on 16 December 1960, there to form Neutralist Armed Forces (FAN).

== Formation and role of the Neutralist Armed Forces ==
Kong Le had led his 2nd Parachute Battalion into the 10 August 1960 coup. The battalion suffered only 17 killed in the Battle of Vientiane, before being forced from the city by Phoumi's troops. As the defeated paratroopers withdrew northward to the Plain of Jars on 16 December, about 400 neutralist adherents joined the column as new recruits, upping the column's strength to about 1,200 men. The revolutionists' withdrawal along Route 13 distracted attention from the nascent Operation Momentum starting up at nearby Ban Padong. In early 1961, French intelligence sources reported at a SEATO meeting in Bangkok that 20 Soviet aircraft were ferrying military aid to the coup force, which had burgeoned to 4,000 men. At about this time, the Joint Chiefs of Staff estimated that unilateral intervention in Laos by the United States would require 60,000 American troops; the intervention option was then rejected. On 3 April 1961, FAN paratroopers were dropped by Soviet aircraft west of Vang Vieng. Coordinating their action with the Pathet Lao, they captured the town from the Royalists on Route 13 on 23 April. Though the way lay open before them, the victorious Neutralists did not extend their offensive toward Vientiane.

Vang Pao's Hmong irregulars—raised through Operation Momentum—were then equipped with 82mm mortars on 1 March 1961. These weapons, with a range greater than 7,000 meters, when emplaced on high points surrounding the Plain of Jars could hit Kong Le's forces almost anywhere on the Plain. Meanwhile, the Royal Lao Army, which was expected to defeat the Neutralists "...distinguish(ed) itself primarily by its lassitude and incompetence."

At this point, both Phoumi and Kong Le reorganized their forces. However, while both sides were reorganizing, the communists launched attacks. On 12 April, Kong Le met with Vang Pao and agreed on cooperation between their forces. The PAVN 19th Border Defense Battalion overran Khamkeut and Lak Sao, nearly severing the lower panhandle from northern Laos by the second week in April 1961. In a second offensive, the PAVN stalemated four of Phoumi's new regiments that were strung out along Route 13 between Luang Prabang and Vientiane. It was during this action that U.S. Special Forces Team Moon was ambushed, and the first Americans killed in action. As a result of PAVN success in these actions, PEO head General Andrew J. Boyle remarked that the communists were poised to take any of the Lao towns along the Mekong River.

By 5 May 1961, the term Forces Armées Neutralistes came into use to describe Kong Le's military. Kong Le recruited enough new soldiers to split BP 2 into six companies. Although designated as airborne units, only the veteran cadre had parachute training. By October 1961, FAN was in conflict with the Royalist guerrillas surrounding the Plain; the effect was to push FAN into cooperation with the communists. After a 23 December 1961 battle between FAN and the guerrillas, a FAN defector and a Vietnamese prisoner verified Vietnamese communist backing for FAN.

By the time the International Agreement on the Neutrality of Laos agreed upon on 23 July 1962 came into effect, FAN had ramped up to a strength of 8,000 troops. Three battalions under Brigadier General Khoumane Boupha were occupying far northern Phongsaly Province. There were two new infantry battalions outposted in Vang Vieng on Route 13, threatening Vientiane from the north. Three battalions moved southward into the panhandle, to occupy Tchepone, Nhommarath, and Mahaxay. FAN's center of gravity on the Plain of Jars was four paratroop battalions and two artillery battalions. The new artillery battalions were not the only heavy weapons units added to FAN. There was a company of PT-76 amphibious tanks formed from the 45 tanks given to FAN by the PAVN. There was also a small air arm, consisting of two C-47s and two Beavers flown north from Vientiane during the retreat to the Plain.

Dissension began between FAN and the communists. PAVN insisted on supplying military trainers to FAN, despite Kong Le's preference for cadre from the French military mission. After FAN tank crews were trained by PAVN, the Neutralists had to seize the PT-76 tanks they had been promised; the PAVN response was to withhold ammunition from FAN. In general, the Pathet Lao's help to FAN was sporadic; the Lao communists were an untrustworthy conduit of Soviet aid. On 27 September, U.S. ambassador Leonard Unger visited Kong Le on the Plain of Jars. They agreed on an American airdrop of blankets and food. On 22 November, as an Air America C-123 prepared to land the aid, pro-communist Neutralist antiaircraft gunners of the Phetsarath Artillery Battalion shot it down, killing the pilots.

On 4 December 1962, the FAN air arm was augmented by three Li-2s given by the USSR, as the Russians ended their logistic support. Also in December, a contingent of FAN pilot candidates went to the Soviet Union for aviation training. To command this growing army, Kong Le promoted himself to Major General. He could muster 4,500 Neutralist soldiers at this time. By contrast, at this time, the PAVN had 9,000 troops stationed in Laos; the Pathet Lao could muster about 19,500 men. The opposing Royal Lao Army reportedly mustered a strength of 51,000.

On 5 January 1963, a BirdAir PV-2T was fired upon and set aflame 30 kilometers south of Muong Sing; a crew member died of injuries. Colonel Kettsana, the FAN commander of MR 2, began to distrust the communists; in February 1963, he was murdered. Sniping and clashes between FAN and the communists became daily events during the spring of 1963. On 1 April, the pro-Pathet Lao Neutralist Foreign Minister, Quinim Pholsena, was killed by his bodyguard; it was regarded as vengeance for Kettsana's homicide. At that point, the Pathet Lao political delegation fled Vientiane. On 2 April, communist forces attacked FAN on the Plain of Jars. Two days later, a pro-Kong Le Neutralist intelligence officer's body was found there.

== Schism of the Neutralists ==
In April 1963, the Neutralists split. Colonel Deuane founded his own Patriotic Neutralists from units abandoning FAN. Deuane had about 250 troops under his command; they allied themselves with General Khamouane Boupha's force of 1,500 in far northern Phongsali Province. The Phetsarath Artillery Battalion, which had downed the Air America plane, was one of the units that joined Deuane. Bataillon Parachutistes 1 (Paratroop Battalion 1) was another, along with all of Khamouane's Neutralist Forces from Military Region 1. In the southern panhandle, the majority of Bataillon Infanterie 4 (Battalion of Infantry 4) near Tchepone defected to the new movement, which allied itself with the Pathet Lao communists. On 6 April 1963, the Pathet Lao launched several simultaneous surprise attacks on the Neutralists on the Plain of Jars. On 10 April 1963, U.S. President John F. Kennedy approved U.S. military aid supply drops to bolster FAN. Although FAN was driven from its positions, it evacuated most of its vehicles and crew-served weapons to Muong Phanh.

As a result of an agreement struck between Vang Pao and Kong Le on 11 April, FAN's new ally, the Royal Lao Army, came to its relief. Within two days, the communists called for a truce; it was short-lived. When communist actions continued against the Neutralists, Hmong Royalist military irregulars feigned an artillery bombardment of Pathet Lao headquarters at Khang Khay and PAVN headquarters at Ban Liang on 20 April as a distraction. On 22 April, Phoumi Nosavan reinforced FAN with two Royalist infantry battalions. Bataillon Infanterie 9 (Battalion of Infantry 9) joined FAN in Muong Phanh, then deployed into the southeastern area of the Plain of Jars. That same day, Bataillon Infanterie 24 (Battalion of Infantry 24) reinforced a FAN hilltop position at Phou Theung. By 24 April, marauding Hmong guerrillas had cut Route 7 in three spots; an Air America pilot reported the cratering as taking out 75 to 100 meters of road in each cut. Route 4 was closed by ambushes, and guerrilla units across the Plain covered FAN's retreating stragglers with harassing raids on the communists. By month's end, casualty figures for April 1963 came to 71 communist killed and 155 wounded, and 85 dead and 43 wounded Neutralists. Royalist losses were negligible.

May 1963 was a time of low morale for FAN, given their losses via enemy action and Patriotic Neutralist defections. An offensive against the communists was planned, then cancelled for fear of provoking an overwhelming counter from PAVN. Souvanna Phouma ordered a defensive posture by Neutralist and Royalist forces for the nonce. By this time, FAN could muster 2,200 men, supported by 50 PT-76 tanks.

== Battle of Lak Sao ==
While centered on the Plain of Jars, FAN raised a Special Guerrilla Battalion that occupied Vang Khy, a village located between Vientiane and Vang Viang. While the reputed purpose of the new battalion was security for Neutralist officials in the capital, the Royalist General Staff suspected it was actually a potential coup force. In December 1963, its commanding officer was murdered in Vientiane. A Royalist assassination was presumed.

In an offensive move coordinated with the Royalists, FAN supplied the forces for one of the columns that attacked Lak Sao in Military Region 3 in late 1963. Composed of Bataillon Infanterie 8 (Battalion of Infantry 8), a PT-76 amphibious tank company, and Bataillon Parachutistes 5 (Battalion of Parachutists 5), the Neutralist column overcame light resistance along Route 8 to occupy Lak Sao in late November. However, by January 1964, the badly beaten FAN troops had been withdrawn from Military Region 3; they been brought to the Plain of Jars. The Route 9 corridor from Khe Sanh, Vietnam to Xepon, Laos was open for a potential North Vietnamese invasion.

In early 1964, FAN forces were co-located with Royalist units atop mountaintop positions at Phou Khe, Phou San, and Phou Nong. The Royalist units were subjected to numerous communists probes of their strongholds, though the Neutralists were ignored. Subsequently, the Royalists vacated Phou Nong.

== The 1964 coup ==
With the FAN offering steadily less reliable support to the Royalists, and the communists on the offensive, neutralist Prime Minister Souvanna Phouma convened a conference on the Plain of Jars on 17 April 1964. Failing in his attempt to calm or quell the three-sided conflict, and discouraged by his failure, Souvanna Phouma returned to Vientiane prepared to resign. However, on the night of 18 April, General Siho Lamphouthacoul led the National Police in a coup. General Kouprasith Abhay, who commanded the Royalist troops in the capital, consented to the coup. Without opposition, Siho's Bataillon Special 33 (Special Battalion 33) conquered the capital's governmental infrastructure. The following morning, coup troops arrested Souvanna Phouma and about 15 other important personages; the detainees were a mixed bag of Frenchmen, Royalists, and Neutralists. When U.S. ambassador Unger backed Souvanna Phouma, the latter was restored to office.

== Continued hostilities ==
By the time of the coup, the Patriotic Neutralists had been largely absorbed into the Pathet Lao; the two sides held the first of their biannual cooperative political congresses in 1964. On the Plain of Jars, the coup sparked further dissension in the Neutralist movement. Two of FAN's paratroop battalions—BP 4 and BP 6—favored siding with the communists. On 27 April 1964, as the Royalist garrison withdrew from Phou San, it was attacked and defeated by communist forces as nearby FAN units deigned to intervene. However, when Pathet Lao occupied the vacated strongpoint overlooking Kong Le's headquarters at Muong Phan, his Bataillon Parachutistes 5 unsuccessfully assaulted the mountaintop. Six days later, the third mountaintop position, on Phou Nong, also fell. The defeated troops split into two columns escaping in opposite directions, with the Royalists retreating southeast while FAN withdrew to the northwest.

On 13 May 1964, as Pathet Lao troops moved to isolate the Neutralist garrisons at Muong Phan and Muong Kheung, a revolt against Kong Le broke out within FAN. His tank company commander, Colonel Sourideth, encircled Kong Le's headquarters with a dozen tanks. The next day, BP 4 went over to Deuane's Patriotic Neutralists. One company of the latter was fighting in an offensive against Royalist regiment Groupement Mobile 17 (Mobile Group 17). By 21 May, Ambassador Unger feared that the neutralist forces in Laos faced extinction if FAN's position at Muang Soui fell to the communists. Kong Le withdrew FAN from the Plain in good order, except for an inconsequential loss of small arms. However, in June, his armored force of 23 vehicles had to be abandoned at Muong Kheung.

The FAN still blocked Route 7 to communist use, as well as holding the strategic all-weather airstrip at Muang Soui. As they were short of expert gunners, a 279-man Thai artillery battalion was flown into Muong Soui on 4 July 1964 to reinforce FAN as part of the Royalist offensive, Operation Triangle. However, a battalion of the PAVN 148 Regiment of the 316th Division, backed by Pathet Lao, held an overwatch position on the heights of Phou Khout. Three FAN battalions took up an unsuccessful offensive to clear them from overlooking Muong Soui. Their failure to capture the ridge left Route 7 blocked to both sides. Deadly minefields inflicted 106 casualties on FAN's paras on 7 August, turning back their fourth assault on Phou Khout. Elsewhere, the FAN garrison in Vang Vieng joined the slow north-bound Royalist offensive column up Route 13 as its contribution to Operation Triangle.

In December 1964, another FAN offensive on the communist-held high ground at Phou Khout failed. Planned to take advantage of the esprit de corps of being personally led by Kong Le, it kicked off on 1 December. Kong Le promptly withdrew into a nearby cave that was a Buddhist shrine, there to meditate while his troops attacked. After suffering 12 dead and 68 wounded from communist tank fire, the FAN troops withdrew to Muang Soui. Their unsuccessful commander was not relieved for his failure, but was sacked by Kong Le for embezzling 1.5 million Lao kip from troop funding.

Elsewhere, FAN Bataillon Infanterie 5 (Infantry Battalion 5) at Moung Hiem, commanded by Souvanna Phouma's nephew Tiao Sisouvanh, made a point of co-existing peacefully with nearby PAVN units. However, on 11 March 1965, the Vietnamese communists unexpectedly turned on them, overran the battalion in a midnight attack, and executed its three senior officers. On 10 November, the FAN commander at Muang Soui suddenly decided he would launch another attack on Phou Khout. On short notice, U.S. aircraft using 750lb. bombs blasted the ridge in the face of heavy antiaircraft fire from machine guns and 37mm cannons. On both 16 and 20 November, FAN attacked up the mountain's north slope. However, air support fizzled out after the 20th, not being resumed until 2 December. When the Christmas bombing truce freed up sorties scheduled for strikes in Vietnam, there was an unsuccessful attempt to restart the air cover for further attacks, but it fizzled.

In January 1966, FAN decided to leave the assault on Phou Khout to American air power. While U.S. air strikes struck the communists there, eight battalions of Neutralists fanned out onto the Plain of Jars on 30 January. In the event, air support was sporadic, and with the exception of BP 2, FAN was unsuccessful. On 12 February 1966, a communist attack overran Lima Site 27; on the 16th, they also attacked Lima Site 36, suffering heavy losses to napalm and to the fire of AC-47 gunships. Nevertheless, by 19 February, they were successful. An immediate counterattack was planned, but put on hold. On the night of 12 March, Lima Site 48 fell. On 14 March, FAN once again attacked Phou Khout, with about 30 sorties of U.S. air dropping napalm to clear the way. The communists were pushed back onto Phou Khout's northern slopes, where they were supported by fire from nearby Hill 1157. FAN suffered 10 dead, 31 wounded. At 0400 hours 20 March, troops from the Pathet Lao 2nd and 701st Battalions drove FAN from the ridgeline; they also closed in on Muang Soui. By 30 March 1966, FAN Bataillon Infanterie 8 (Infantry Battalion 8) had had enough; they walked off the battlefield and insisted on being returned to Vang Vieng.

== Kong Le's departure ==
Flag the Neutralist Movement created in by Kong Le in exile after the war.

On 16 October 1966, Kong Le was forced into exile. Royalist Generals Ouane Rattikone and Kouprasith Abhay wanted control of FAN's 12,000 troops. With their consent, three of Kong Le's subordinates divided up command of FAN after the Royalist General Staff agreed to accept them into the Royalist forces at their serving rank. Kong Le departed on a Royal Lao Air Force C-47 on 17 October.

On 24 June 1969, the North Vietnamese communists launched Operation Toan Thang. They assaulted the strategic Muang Soui all-weather airfield on Route 7 with four battalions stiffened by PT-76 tanks. Neutralist forces on hand outnumbered the Vietnamese attackers by a three to one margin. The mixed defense force of Hmong guerrillas and FAN troops held out until 06:00 on 27 June, at which time they scattered to abandon their post to the communists. By now, Vang Pao had come to dislike and distrust FAN. The Operation Off Balance followup mustered 700 FAN troops for a counterattack on the communists. However, FAN and the Royal Lao Army fled the battlefield rather than move into the assault, leaving Vang Pao's guerrillas to carry on. The FAN desertion doomed the Off Balance counterattack.

The Neutralists had established their headquarters at Khang Khay. On 20 February 1970, a determined North Vietnamese battalion backed by tanks and led by Dac Cong sappers chased FAN and its co-located Hmong irregulars from the base. The casualty count for Royalist forces for the first half of 1970 illustrated just irrelevant FAN's contributions to the war efforts had become. Of the 614 Royalist troops killed during January to June 1970, just ten were Neutralists.

== See also ==
- Laotian Civil War
- List of weapons of the Laotian Civil War
- Royal Lao Armed Forces
- Royal Lao Army
- Royal Lao Army Airborne
- Royal Lao Police
