= Battle of Vientiane =

1960 battle of the Laotian Civil War

- Part of the Laotian Civil War, 1960 Laotian coups and the Vietnam War
Date	13 – 16 December 1960
Location	Central Laos, concentrated on Vientiane; sporadic fighting into the Plain of Jars
Result	Royalist victory; Phoumi Nosavan gains control of the Kingdom of Laos; The Neutralist Armed Forces of Kong Le retreat to the Plain of Jars
Territorial changes	Loyalist forces capture Vientiane; Forces Armées Neutralistes establish themselves in the Plain of Jars

Belligerents
(Laos) Royal Lao loyalists Supported by Thailand: PARU; RTA; United States: CIA; South Vietnam: VTF	Neutralist Armed Forces; North Vietnam (Laos) Pathet Lao; Supported by USSR: SVF

Commanders and leaders
(Laos) Phoumi Nosavan (Laos) Kouprasith Abhay (Laos) Siho Lamphouthacoul (Laos) Ekarath Souvannarot (Laos) Bounleut Sanichanh (Laos) Vang Pao (South Vietnam) Nguyễn Khánh (South Vietnam) Nguyễn Văn Thiệu	Kong Le

Units involved
(Laos) Groupement Mobile B (Laos) Groupement Tactique (Laos) Groupement Mobile Special 1 (Laos) Bataillon Volontaires 32 (Laos) Bataillon Parachutistes 1 (Laos) Bataillon Volontaires 21 (Laos) Hmong guerrillas PARU Team A PARU Team B PARU Team C PARU Team D PARU Team E 105mm howitzers (South Vietnam) C-47 air support CIA air transport support	Bataillon Parachutistes 2 (Laos) Pathet Lao armed forces (North Vietnam) 122mm mortars (North Vietnam) 105mm howitzers (North Vietnam) Five battalions Soviet air transport support

Strength
(Laos) N/A (Thailand) Four 105mm howitzers, twenty-five Border Patrol Police (South Vietnam) One C-47	1,200; 1,060 (North Vietnam) Six 122mm mortars, four 105mm howitzers; five battalions invaded Laos from the north

Casualties and losses
	At least 17 Neutralistes killed
- In Vientiane, about 600 civilians killed and 7,000 civilians left homeless; about 600 homes destroyed.

The Battle of Vientiane was a major and decisive battle of the 1960 Laotian coups, that occurred amid the Laotian Civil War. Fought between 13 and 16 December 1960, the battle ended with General Phoumi Nosavan regaining control of the Kingdom of Laos with the aid of the Royal Thai Government and the U.S. Central Intelligence Agency. Vientiane, the capital of Laos, was left devastated by the fighting, with about 600 civilians dead, about the same number of homes destroyed, which 7,000 left homeless. The losing Neutralist Armed Forces under Captain Kong Le retreated onto the strategic Plain of Jars, to begin an uneasy coexistence with the Pathet Lao and the invading North Vietnamese Army.

With the northeastern quarter of Laos under communist control, the United States and the Kingdom of Thailand deepened their involvement in the Laotian Civil War.

== Overview ==
Beginning on 23 December 1950, the United States began military aid to the French administration of the Kingdom of Laos as they fought the First Indochina War. U.S. support would increase to the point of underwriting the Lao budget in its entirety. The rationale behind the support was that it was in American interests to combat the communist insurrectionists in Laos. Banned by treaty from stationing an overt Military Assistance Advisory Group in Laos, in December 1955 the U.S instead chose to establish a "civilian" military aid office within the U.S. embassy in Vientiane. The Programs Evaluation Office was charged with channeling the materiel to the Lao military.

Of the 68 ethnic minorities that comprised the Lao population, the Lao Loum numerically predominated. They dwelt along the Mekong River Valley along the southern border with the Kingdom of Thailand. The King of Laos and most of the ruling class of Laos were Lao Loum. About 20 of these influential lowland Lao families actually controlled Laos.

== Background ==
Capital Kong Le was an American-trained paratrooper considered one of the more aggressive Lao officers. On 29 July 1959, he led his unit, Bataillon Parachutistes 2 (Paratroop Battalion 2) in a futile attempt to reinforce other Royalist troops engaged with the Pathet Lao in armed disputes over Royalist outposts in Xam Neua Province. Kong Le and his men were disgruntled by the RLA's failure to pay them while they were on the combat sweep.

Subsequently, on 25 December 1959, Kong Le and his disaffected paratroopers would supply the muscle for General Phoumi Nosavan's coup. Phoumi became the defense minister and the de facto ruler of Laos.

When matters worsened for the airborne troops, Kong Le led his mutinous paratroop battalion in a nearly bloodless coup on 9 August 1960. Once he gained control of his national capital of Vientiane, he deposed the Royal Lao Government. The Minister of Defense, General Phoumi Nosavan, was his only real opposition. As the captain solidified his grip on the Kingdom of Laos, Phoumi settled into Savannakhet in southern Laos to gather forces to support a counter-coup.

== Prelude ==
=== Movement to contact ===
At 08:00 on 21 November 1960, Phoumi Nosavan's army moved from Savannakhet into the offensive. Its mission was to march northward on Route 13 along the eastern bank of the Mekong River some hundreds of kilometers and seize the capital. Groupement Mobile B (Mobile Group B) led off, with two M-24 tanks and six armored cars, commanded by Lieutenant Colonel Tiao (Prince) Ekarath Souvannarot. In trail to GMB was Groupement Tactique (Tactical Group), a mixed force of paratroopers from Bataillon Parachustistes 1 (Paratroop Battalion 1), two infantry battalions, a volunteer battalion, and a contingent of artillery from 1st Field Artillery Group. A third contingent, Major Siho Lamphouthacoul's Groupement Mobile Special 1 (Special Mobile Group 1) containing Bataillon Speciale 11 (Special Battalion 11) and Bataillon Speciale 33 (Special Battalion 33) boarded landing craft to be transported northward on the Mekong River.

On 22 November, the Central Intelligence Agency flew in five five-man commando teams from the Thai Police Aerial Reinforcement Unit (PARU). Each team contained two officers, a medic, and two radiomen. PARU Teams A and B would join the head of the column. Teams D and E would trail the movement. Team C would flank the movement to the east, at Khamkeut. They supplied added communication and control capability to the column and advised on ways to circumvent any opposing strong points.

By 25 November, the three Groupements converged on Thakhek, approximately 135 kilometers north of Savannakhet. They continued north toward Paksan, some 190 kilometers further. On 5 December, they blasted their way across the Nam Kading (Kading River) just south of Paksan without opposition. At the same time, PARU Team C and Bataillon Volontaires 32 (Volunteer Battalion 32) shifted eastward to their flanking position at Khamkeut.

Elements of Kong Le's Bataillon Parachutistes 2 had chased pro-Phoumi forces from Paksan on 22 September and still occupied it. Faced with a new threat to this bastion, Kong Le rushed additional troops from Vientiane some 150 kilometers to Paksan to reinforce it against the arrival of Phoumi's troops. Some residual anti-Kong Le forces led by Colonel Kouprasith Abhay emerged in the power vacuum this left, bidding for control of the capital, and the parachutist reinforcements had to be returned to the capital. As a result, Phoumi's assault element suffered no serious opposition, and rolled into Paksan. At the same time, the BP 1 paratroopers who were on Phoumi's side were airdropped on the Royal Lao Army headquarters at Chinimao, on the verge of the capital. Suspicious of Kouprasith's ambitions, Phoumi appointed Brigadier General Bounleut Sanichanh as commander-in-chief of the counter-coup forces.

At 10:30 on 10 December 1960, representatives of Kong Le departed for Hanoi to formalize a pact between Kong Le's Forces Armees Neutralistes (Neutral Armed Forces) and the People's Army of Vietnam (PAVN). At 09:00 the following day, a dozen PAVN artillery advisers landed in Vientiane and unloaded half a dozen 122 mm mortars and four 105 mm howitzers to reinforce FAN, thus beginning a Soviet-backed airlift. Meanwhile, a scratch force of Phoumists launched a flanking movement from Savannakhet through Thailand to Chinimao.

Kong Le spent 11 and 12 December trying to whip up the Vientiane citizenry's support for FAN. Phoumi's forces had pushed through Paksan and were crossing the Nam Ngum (Ngum River) only 50 kilometers from Vientiane. GMS 1 was slated to circle north of the capital and close in on Wattay Airbase in Vientiane's western outskirts. GM B would drive straight down Route 13 to hook up with Kouprasith's troops in Chinaimo.

== Battle ==
=== Fighting for Vientiane ===
The battle for Vientiane began at 13:20 on 13 December 1960 with an advance by Phoumi's forces. They launched an infantry battalion into the capital even as they linked up with the troops at Chinamao. Simultaneously, Kouprasith's loyalists were led by BP 1 paratroopers in an attack on the city that stalled at the city limits under inaccurate howitzer fire. Both of the Phoumist columns stalled at the eastern municipal limits under heavy weapons fire from FAN troops. Both sides failed to close for combat, settling on direct fire by crew served weapons and point-blank artillery. Entire neighborhoods of local huts were set aflame. When night came, the two sides settled in under a moonless sky.

The following day's fighting would severely damage Vientiane. PAVN shelling in the morning of 14 December pushed Kouprasith's troops back into Camp Chinamiao, where Kouprasith languished in a sickbed. With PAVN artillery support, Phoumi's troops forced Kong Le's troops to the western and northern fringes of the city. By 15:00, the central district was in ruins; fallen trees and loose electrical wires littered the street. The National Treasury had been looted and burned. The post office and Prime Minister Souvanna Phouma's office were flattened. Wattay Airbase fell under Phoumi's control, and the Soviet military aid airlifts to Kong Le's forces halted.

During the battle, the Ministry of Defense came under fire; both .50 caliber machine guns and a recoilless rifle were among the weapons engaged. The American embassy next door took an artillery shell in the ceiling of its old chancellor building, setting the CIA office afire. Based on reports of the fighting, American Joint Task Force 116, afloat in the South China Sea, was placed on a four-hour alert. The U.S. 2d Airborne Battle Group was also alerted, for the possible seizure of Lao airfields. Uneasy darkness again fell on Vientiane. All was quiet except the dueling radio stations broadcasting propaganda from both sides.

That night, four Royal Thai Army 105 mm howitzers were smuggled across the Mekong into Chinamiao, with one of them becoming embarrassingly stuck in Mekong sand until it was freed at dawn. At 11:30 on 15 December, GMS 1 entered Vientiane from the north, only to be stopped by PAVN artillery and small arms fire from Wattay. At 13:30, Kouprasith sent 80 troops in an attempted amphibious landing to cut off Kong Le's retreat, but the waterborne force overshot its objective. Meantime, BP 1 paratroopers loyal to Phoumi moved door to door hunting down Kong Le's BP 2 paratroopers who had been isolated but continued to snipe away. As evening came, a calm fell again, again broken only by the radio broadcasts.

On 16 December, the contending forces warred incoherently over individual blocks of buildings and single streets. The two sides distinguished themselves from one another by the color of scarves worn with their uniforms; now and then, the combatants switched scarves and sides. However, by afternoon, Phoumi's and Kouprasith's superior weight of forces prevailed. Kong Le's men were pushed back into Wattay.

PAVN gunners wanted to level the entirety of Vientiane. Instead, Kong Le loaded up his 1,200 troops and retreated northwards toward the Plain of Jars, accompanied by the PAVN artillerists, a single tank, and a few captives. A couple of sections of 60 mm mortars covered the withdrawal, holding up the Phoumist advance until late in the day. The devastated city they left had suffered at least 600 houses destroyed, about an equal number of citizens killed, and 7,000 left homeless; however, the Neutralists' fighting ability remained intact. Kong Le's forces had suffered only 17 killed.

=== Retreat to the Plain of Jars ===
As victors Phoumi and Kouprasith kept a suspicious eye on one another, cholera threatened the Lao city's populace. A 19 December airlift began medical aid flights to obviate the menace of a cholera epidemic. Concealed within this air contingent was a C-47 from the Republic of Vietnam Air Force. Colonel Nguyễn Khánh and Lieutenant Colonel Nguyễn Văn Thiệu spent a day discussing possible joint South Vietnamese/Lao operations against the PAVN on Route 9 in the Lao panhandle, concluding that the situation was too unsettled to conclude anything.

Kong Le continued his northward withdrawal on Route 13 with his forces; they blew up the bridge over the Nam Lik (Lik River) to cover their retirement. His Pathet Lao allies sent 1,000 men southward on Route 13 to Moung Kassy, some 40 kilometers north of his position at Vang Vieng. However, Kong Le drove his convoy of vehicles past them to capture the Route 13/7 intersection at Sala Phou Khoun, leaving the Pathet Lao at Vang Vieng as a rear guard. Faking a feint up Route 13 north to assault Luang Prabang, Kong Le instead led FAN eastwards onto the Plain of Jars, surmounting the obstacles of fallen trees blocking Route 7. As FAN approached the all-weather airfield at Muang Soui, the Hmong guerrilla company that had felled the trees dispersed into the countryside. Their commanding officer radioed that two battalions of paratroopers were drifting down upon the airfield; then he also fled.

For two weeks after Kong Le left Vientiane, the American embassy urged Phoumi to take up pursuit. On 30 December, he outlined a plan prophetic of the future Operation Triangle. Not knowing that FAN had departed from the Route 7/13 junction, Phoumi planned to have columns closing in on it from all three directions: from Luang Prabang to the north; from Vientiane on the south; from the Plain of Jars to the east.

By this time, Kong Le's column was spilling onto the Plain of Jars from Muang Soui. Further east on Route 7, on 31 December, at Nong Het on the Vietnamese border, 60 Pathet Lao soldiers backed by PAVN cadre attacked a single company Royalist garrison from Bataillon Volontaires 21 (Volunteer Battalion 21). The garrison's call to Headquarters Military Region 2 for reinforcements somehow become an MR 2 report of a seven-battalion communist invasion force. Royalist battalions residing near Route 7 on the Plain of Jars drifted south out of FAN's path, avoiding battle. Only Lieutenant Colonel Vang Pao's irregular military offered resistance as they withdrew in an orderly fashion. By the end of the first week of 1961, FAN had linked up with about five PAVN battalions invading Laos.

== Aftermath ==
On 19 January 1961, as U.S. President Dwight D. Eisenhower turned over his office to the newly elected John F. Kennedy, he was influenced to brief the incoming president about the importance of Laos to the domino theory.

Kong Le and his newly formed Neutralist Armed Forces (Forces Armées Neutralistes) would succeed in withdrawing northward to the strategic Plain of Jars and capturing it, suffering only three killed and ten wounded in the process. The vital road junction of Routes 7 and 13 remained in FAN custody. The central position of the Plain of Jars in northeastern Laos granted Kong Le effective control of the countryside from Vang Vieng to Xam Neua. The Royalists and their American backers were left with two possible methods of resisting FAN—air power and Hmong guerrillas. Operation Millpond was established to supply the air power; ten AT-6 Texans for the Royal Lao Air Force, and training for pilots to man them, would be jointly supplied by the Thais and Americans. Eventually, the first Thai mercenary pilots were included in this program. A training program for Hmong guerrillas was also established via the CIA. When a Thai request to the Southeast Asia Treaty Organization for intervention was declined on 27 March 1961, the Thais would begin wholesale training of Lao troops within Thailand.

Once established on the Plain, FAN would pursue an erratic course. It would ally with, fight against, or coexist with, either Vietnamese or Pathet Lao through 1974.
