= 1960 Laotian coups =

Military coups of the Laotian Civil War

- Part of Laotian Civil War, Vietnam War, and the Cold War in Indochina
Date	December 25, 1959—December 16, 1960
Location	Kingdom of Laos
Result	Series of coups; Phoumi Nosavan seizes power and is then temporarily ousted by his former ally Kong Le; Three-way conflict between Royalists in support of Phoumi, Neutralists in support of Kong Le, and the Pathet Lao; Attempt by Kouprasith Abhay to seize power from Kong Le fails; Battle of Vientiane, Phoumi Nosavan regains power; Kong Le retreats to the Plain of Jars

The 1960 Laotian coups brought about a pivotal change of government in the Kingdom of Laos. General Phoumi Nosavan established himself as the strongman running Laos in a bloodless coup on 25 December 1959. He would be himself overthrown on 10 August 1960 by Kong Le, a young paratrooper captain who had backed him in the 1959 coup. When the American officials underwriting Laos assessed Kong Le as a potential communist, they backed Phoumi's return to power in November and December 1960. In turn, the Soviets backed Kong Le as their proxy in this Cold War standoff. After the Battle of Vientiane ended in his defeat, Kong Le withdrew northward to the strategic Plain of Jars on 16 December 1960.

Having taken an independent stance in the Laotian Civil War, Kong Le and his Forces Armee Neutraliste would remain an unpredictable influence upon the war until 1974.

== Overview and background ==
Beginning on 23 December 1950, the United States began military aid to the French administration of the Kingdom of Laos as they fought the First Indochina War. U.S. support would increase to the point of underwriting the Lao budget in its entirety. The rationale behind the support was that it was in American interests to combat the communist insurrectionists in Laos as part of the Cold War. Banned by treaty from stationing an overt Military Assistance Advisory Group in Laos, in December 1955 the U.S. instead chose to establish a "civilian" military aid office within the U.S. embassy in Vientiane. The Programs Evaluation Office was charged with channeling war material to the Lao military.

Of the 68 ethnic minorities that comprised the Lao population, the Lao Loum numerically predominated. They dwelt along the Mekong River Valley along the southern border with the Kingdom of Thailand. The King of Laos and most of the ruling class of Laos were Lao Loum. About 20 of these influential lowland Lao families actually controlled Laos. With the PEO confined to office work, distribution of military goods took place without PEO followup. From 1955 to 1958, the U.S. would sink $202 million into Laos. This aid led to corruption as it was siphoned off by recipients.

As Bernard Fall noted from personal observation, the support of the Lao military was for political reasons, and not necessarily for self-defense. The Lao soldiers were among the most highly paid in the world. They cost an average of about $1,000 apiece annually; the global average for a soldier's pay was $848 per capita. Many Lao soldiers were fictional recruits, with their pay being siphoned off by Lao officers. Junior Lao officers afforded expensive villas. More disheartening to PEO, there were thievish Americans in the program.

The basic Lao economy was so underdeveloped that an artificial economy developed. U.S. dollars funded imports that were sold commercially on the open market. The resultant Lao kips went to underwrite the Lao military. These payments were also subsequently turned over into foreign goods. With no controls on the imports, the quality and utility of provisions were often ignored.

Fall summarized the result by quoting a pro-American Lao officer, Sisouk na Champassak: "Black market deals in American aid dollars reached such proportions that the Pathet Lao needed no propaganda to turn the rural people against the townspeople."

This rampant boodling would provoke the ire of young Royal Lao Army Captain Kong Le.

== The coups ==
=== Phoumi Nosavan's rise to power ===
Phoumi Nosavan coup
- Part of 1960 Laotian coups
Date	December 25, 1959
Location	Kingdom of Laos
Result	Phoumi Nosavan ousts Prime Minister Phoui Sananikone with approval from King Sisavang Vatthana

Belligerents
(Kingdom of Laos) Supporters of Phoumi	(Kingdom of Laos) Government of Laos

Commanders and leaders
Phoumi Nosavan; Kong Le; Ouane Rattikone	Phoui Sananikone

Units involved
(Kingdom of Laos) Second Paratroop Battalion	No combat units engaged

Casualties and losses
None	None

On 29 July 1959, under command of General Amkha Soukhavong, Captain Kong Le led Bataillon Parachutistes 2 (Parachute Battalion 2) to reinforce other Royalist troops engaged with the Pathet Lao communists in armed disputes over Royalist outposts in Xam Neua Province. Accompanied by two Filipino advisers, the battalion patrolled for three days without contact with any enemy. When the captain drove to Xam Neua City to report to General Amkha, he was outraged to find the city had been abandoned by the general, as well as by its military and civil administration. Kong Le was further disgruntled by the RLA's failure to pay his men while they were on the combat sweep.

By December 1959, Kong Le and his paratroop battalion were bivouacked at Wattay Airfield outside the Lao capital of Vientiane. Camp Sikhay offered the paras a choice of battered wooden shacks or decaying French colonial housing on the banks of the Mekong River. Kong Le made connections with the Project Hotfoot Special Forces who were building a ranger training course nearby. As a result, BP 2 would run through the ranger training in 200 man increments.

While the commanding officer of BP 2 was in the United States, leaving Kong Le in charge of the battalion, he was approached by his uncle-in-law, General Ouane Rattikone. On 25 December 1959, the term of the National Assembly expired. However, elections for its replacement were not scheduled until April. As Kong Le led the only crack troops in town, his help was essential in helping Ouane and General Phoumi Nosavan install the latter in power to fill the political vacuum. The paras secured their airfield, captured the city's radio station, the national bank, municipal power plant, and various ministries without firing a single shot. Prime Minister Phoui Sananikone had been decisively deposed. Phoumi thus succeeded to the dictatorship of Laos because of Kong Le's decisive actions.

=== Kong Le's coup ===
Kong Le coup
- Part of 1960 Laotian coups
Date	August 10, 1960
Location	Kingdom of Laos
Result	Kong Le seizes power from Phoumi

Belligerents
(Kingdom of Laos) Government of Phoumi	Forces Armées Neutralistes

Commanders and leaders
(Kingdom of Laos) Sounthone Pathammavong	Kong Le

Units involved
(Kingdom of Laos) Governmental forces	Second Paratroop Battalion

Casualties and losses
6 killed	

On 7 January 1960, a 67-year-old moderate politician named Kou Abhay was appointed as Prime Minister of Laos. His mandate was to serve until elections in April. The April elections were fraudulently fixed by the Royal Lao Army, aided by the Central Intelligence Agency. The Pathet Lao lost to such unfair tactics as gerrymandered election districts, payoffs, and stuffed ballot boxes. Prince Somsanith Vongkotrattana was named Prime Minister.

At 0300 hours 10 August 1960, Kong Le launched the Second Paratroop Battalion in a coup. The same crucial points were seized as in the 1959 coup, with the addition of the seizure of Vientiane's docks at Tha Deua and the arrest of General Sounthone Pathammavong, the army commander in chief. By 0700 hours, Kong Le controlled the capital. Only six people were killed during the takeover. Any possible opposition was stranded in Luang Prabang. Thao Ma flew to Luang Prabang to relate news of the coup to Phoumi Nosavan.

Kong Le's ascension to power had lifted him from obscurity to the world's notice. Both sides of the proxy war, the Americans and the Russians, began to shape their moves to influence him. Within a day, the Pathet Lao pledged their cooperation with Kong Le.

=== Tussle for spoils ===
Once in power, Kong Le denounced foreign intervention in Laos. In a series of public speeches on 10 and 11 August, the new head of state spoke out for the need for national neutrality. He saw little reason for Lao to fight Lao, as the Pathet Lao and the Royalists were doing. He resented undue influence by the wealthy ruling families. In a blunt broadcast, he claimed:

What leads us to carry out this revolution is our desire to stop the bloody civil war; eliminate grasping public servants and military commanders...whose property amounts to much more than their monthly salaries can afford.... It is the Americans who have brought government officials and army commanders, and caused war and dissension in our country.

Of all the displaced government officials, only Phoumi Nosavan, holding the post of Minister of Defense, resisted being overthrown. On 10 August, Phoumi was flown by Thao Ma to Bangkok to solicit support from his first cousin, Field Marshal Sarit Thanarat, the dictator of the Kingdom of Thailand.

On 13 August, the National Assembly met under the guns of the mutineers; under duress, they dismissed the cabinet members stranded in Luang Prabang. At the same time, Kong Le demanded Souvanna Phouma assume the post of Prime Minister. Meanwhile, Phoumi was flown by Thao Ma to Savannakhet to establish a headquarters there to pull together a resistance movement. On 14 August, 21 members of the deposed administration joined him there. On 16 August, pro-Phoumi propaganda leaflets were airdropped on Vientiane, promising Phoumi's return. However, in Vientiane on 17 August, the National Assembly, while held captive by Kong Le's forces, formed a new Royal Lao Government, naming Souvanna Phouma as Prime Minister. Souvanna subsequently appointed General Ouane as commander in chief of the RLA.

Official American reactions to the situation were mixed. In Vientiane, American officials, the Project Hotfoot teams, and the Programs Evaluation Office did not choose a side. However, a shadow PEO of about 40 Americans was formed in Savannakhet to support Phoumi because he was an avowed anti-communist. He began broadcasting anti-Kong Le radio messages on 18 August. Also on 18 August 1960, a Voice of America broadcast announced that it would support the King of Laos in his choice. The next day, Radio Pathet Lao began broadcasting anti-Kong Le propaganda. Kong Le had his own leaflets airdropped over Savannakhet on 19 August. Meanwhile, Field Marshal Sarit established the secretive Kaw Taw unit to channel support to Phoumi.

On 23 August, U.S. officials assured Phoumi of their backing. That same day, Kong Le handed out 3,000 weapons for self-defense to villagers on the outskirts of Vientiane; most of these guns ended up in Pathet Lao hands. When Thai Border Patrol Police commandos from Phoumi's side shelled Vientiane on both 1 and 4 September, Kong Le's troops drove them off.

The U.S. suspected Kong Le was leaning toward becoming an independent communist like Fidel Castro. There was political turmoil and sporadic combat within Laos as both Kong Le and Phoumi solicited support from Lao senior officers. Kong Le had not only the support of his own BP 2 in Military Region 5, but also that of the co-located BP 3. The staff at Military Region 1 in Luang Prabang plumped for him, as did Lieutenant Colonel Khamouane Boupha and his troops in farflung Phongsaly Province. Internationally, he drew tepid support, mostly by communist-bloc nations. The French military mission delivered vague promises and fresh French uniforms. Lao commanding officers such as Generals Amkha Soukhavong, Kouprasith Abhay, Ouane Rattikone, Oudone Sananikone, and Sing Rattanasamy backed him with various levels of enthusiasm.

On 10 September 1960, Phoumi and Prince Boun Oum formed a Revolutionary Committee to oppose Souvanna Phouma's rule. Phoumi used his influence with the Thai dictator to have an embargo placed on overland shipments into Laos; 10,000 tons of Vientiane-bound U.S. military materiel accumulated on Thai loading docks. During the second week in September 1960, the CIA supplied Phoumi with a $1,000,000 bankroll to finance his coup. On 16 September, the Pathet Lao ordered their troops to forgo attacking Kong Le's neutralist forces in favor of attacking Royalist units. The following day, the 2nd Pathet Lao Parachute Battalion attacked a Royalist garrison of 1,500 troops in Xam Neua. The Americans, who had been indecisive, now plumped for aerial resupply of besieged Xam Neua; they stressed that the action was purely defensive.

The Royal Lao Army lacking its own airlift capacity, Air America was contracted to use its two C-46s and two C-47s to resupply the RLA from 17 to 27 September. Meanwhile, on 22 September 1960, elements of BP 2 evicted pro-Phoumi troops from Pakxan, 120 kilometers from Vientiane. In the far north, in the Pathet Lao occupied territory of Xam Neua, Kong Le's paratroopers parachuted in on 28 September. Two plus battalions of pro-Phoumi troops fled the city on 29 September, leaving it under control of Kong Le and the Pathet Lao. To the south of them, an airborne assault on Vientiane by Phoumi's paratroopers was scheduled for 29 September, then cancelled.

On 6 October, American ambassador Winthrop G. Brown, in ongoing attempts at mending the national split, asked King Sisavang Vatthana to form a caretaker government that would include both sides. Former ambassador and serving Assistant Secretary of State J. Graham Parsons flew in to pressure Souvanna Phouma into breaking contact with the Soviets. On 17 October, his companion, John N. Irwin II, flew south to Ubon to assure Phoumi of U.S. support. Also in early October, the U.S. suspended aid to Laos. Vang Pao declared that Military Region 2's forces backed Phoumi. After internecine struggle, by 10 November, Military Region 1 remained in Phoumi's control. On 9 November, after agreeing to accept Soviet aid, Souvanna named his new cabinet. It included Quinim Pholsena and a couple of Pathet Lao officials. This solidified American support for Phoumi. Moreover, on 16 November, General Ouane changed sides; he flew to Savannakhet to join Phoumi.

=== Phoumi's counter-coup ===
Counter-coup by Phoumi Nosavan
- Part of 1960 Laotian coups
Date	November 21, 1960—December 11, 1960
Location	Kingdom of Laos
Result	Phoumi Nosavan encroaches on Paksan, threatening Kong Le in Vientiane

Belligerents
(Kingdom of Laos) Royalist forces Supported by: United States: CIA	Forces Armées Neutralistes

Commanders and leaders
(Kingdom of Laos) Phoumi Nosavan	Kong Le; Southone

With Central Intelligence Agency financial backing, and aided by CIA-trained commandos, at 0800 hours on 21 November 1960 Phoumi's troops launched their counter-coup to reclaim Vientiane. The northward movement to Vientiane would take nearly a month, but by 7 December, they were approaching Paksan, and poised for an attack on the capital. Kong Le ordered most of his paratroopers from Vientiane to reinforce his forward garrison at Paksan.

On 10 December, General Southone tried to confer with Colonel Kouprasith Abhay in Vientiane; however, Abhay had sneaked off to Tha Deua to confer with Phoumi, who had helicoptered in for a planning meeting.

==== Kouprasith Abhay's counter-coup attempt ====
Kouprasith Abhay coup
- Part of Counter-coup by Phoumi Nosavan, 1960 Laotian coups
Date	December 8, 1960
Location	Vientiane, Kingdom of Laos
Result	Coup by Kouprasith fails. Kong Le forced to withdraw his forces from Paksan in order to combat the coup in Vientiane.
Territorial changes	Phoumi captures Paksan

Belligerents
Forces of Kouprasith Abhay	Forces Armées Neutralistes	(Kingdom of Laos) Royalist forces

Commanders and leaders
Kouprasith Abhay	Kong Le	(Kingdom of Laos) Phoumi Nosavan

Units involved
2 airborne companies; 150 military clerks	Second Paratroop Battalion	

At this juncture, on 8 December, Colonel Kouprasith Abhay ventured forth from lurking in Camp Chinaimo to co-opt an air drop of paratroopers incoming from Luang Prabang. He gathered a scratch force of two companies of airborne soldiers and 150 military clerks and moved them in to displace the few Kong Le paras left in the capital. Kouprasith's men seized the radio station and various strategic points in the town. He announced his allegiance to Souvanna Phouma, and his opposition to Kong Le. Kouprasith doubted Phoumi's ability to solve the ongoing crisis; his name went unmentioned in the proclamations.

Kong Le promptly recalled his reinforcements, and airborne soldiers returning from Paksan wearing scarlet armbands displaced Kouprasith's troops wearing white ones. Paksan fell to Phoumi on 8 December. Thus Kouprasith's counter-coup within the counter-coup was ended by the paratroopers responsible for the ongoing coup.

== Battle of Vientiane ==
Suspicious of Kouprasith's ambitions, Phoumi appointed Brigadier General Bounleut Sanichanh as commander-in-chief of the counter-coup forces. On 9 December, Souvanna Phouma appointed General Southone to head the nation, then fled to Phnom Penh, Cambodia.

At 1030 hours on 10 December 1960, representatives of Kong Le departed for Hanoi to formalize a pact beginning a Soviet-backed airlift. Meanwhile, a scratch force of Phoumists launched a flanking movement from Savannakhet through Thailand to Chinimao.

Kong Le spent 11 and 12 December trying to whip up the Vientiane citizenry's support for FAN. Phoumi's forces had pushed through Paksan and were crossing the Nam Ngum (Ngum River) only 50 kilometers from Vientiane. Meanwhile, in Luang Prabang, a quorum of the National Assembly, having been flown in by U.S. Operations Mission aircraft, voted "no confidence" in Souvanna Phouma's regime, and endorsed Phoumi and his Revolutionary Committee. By Lao law, the vote of "no confidence" left the country without a legal government until the king pronounced an ordinance establishing a new one. Royal Ordinance 282 promptly followed, in favor of Phoumi.

The battle for Vientiane began at 1320 hours on 13 December 1960 as Phoumi's forces attacked. The following four days' fighting would severely damage Vientiane. The central district was left in ruins; fallen trees and loose electrical wires littered the streets. The devastated city had suffered at least 600 houses destroyed, about an equal number of citizens killed, and 7,000 were left homeless. Military casualties were minor. One source reported paratrooper casualties as three killed, ten wounded; another gives a figure of 17 killed.

On 16 December, Kong Le loaded his troops onto vehicles and retreated northwards toward the Plain of Jars, leaving Phoumi's forces in control of the capital and country.

== Aftermath ==
On 27 December 1960, Phoumi lodged a protest with the United Nations because the Soviet Union was airlifting supplies to Kong Le's troops. Once he did that, he was supplied with ten T-6 Harvards from Royal Thai Air Force stocks to build up the Royal Lao Air Force.

As the battle wound down, 40 National Assembly members were flown from Luang Prabang to Savannakhet via Air America. Once they passed a vote of no confidence, the King appointed Prince Boun Oum to head an interim government, although Souvanna had yet to resign as Prime Minister. Both Thailand and the United States immediately recognized the new government.

Kong Le and his newly formed Forces Armee Neutraliste (Neutralist Armed Force) succeeded in withdrawing northward to the strategic 500 square mile Plain of Jars. Once there, they were supported by a Soviet airlift supply operation.

Once established there, FAN would pursue an erratic course. It would ally with, fight against, or coexist with, either Vietnamese, Pathet Lao, or Royalist forces through 1974.
