= Royal Lao Government =

1953-1975 government of Laos

Pre-1975 Royal Lao flag

The Royal Lao Government was the ruling authority in the Kingdom of Laos from 1947 until the communist seizure of power in December 1975 and the proclamation of the Lao People's Democratic Republic. The Franco-Lao Treaty of 1953 gave Laos full independence but the following years were marked by a rivalry between the neutralists under Prince Souvanna Phouma, the right wing under Prince Boun Oum of Champassak, and the left-wing, Lao Patriotic Front under Prince Souphanouvong and future prime minister Kaysone Phomvihane. During this period, a number of unsuccessful attempts were made to establish coalition governments.

== Notable members of the RLG ==
- Prince Souphantharangsi – the secretary general of the royal palace and brother of the king.
- Prince Bovone Vatthana – former provincial governor and half brother of the king.
- Prince Thongsouk – director of protocol of the royal palace and half brother of the king.
- Prince Souk Bouavong – former provincial governor and minister.
- Touby Lyfoung – Deputy Minister of Telecommunications.
- Pheng Phongsavan – Minister of the Interior.

== First Coalition Government ==
The First Coalition Government was founded on the basis of the Vientiane Agreements of 1957. It would last until May 1958.

== Second Coalition Government ==
The Second Coalition Government was founded as a condition toward enacting the International Agreement on the Neutrality of Laos in 1962. The Royalist defeat at the Battle of Luang Namtha weakened their bargaining position so that they agreed to the coalition.

== Aftermath ==
After the communist takeover in 1975, the communist Pathet Lao government killed members of the Royal Lao family, including:

- King Savang Vatthana,
- Queen Khamphoui,
- Crown Prince Vong Savang, along with other former government officials, civil servants and those suspected of aiding forces that opposed the communist government.

== See also ==
- History of Laos since 1945
- Major General Vang Pao
