= Operation Momentum =

1961–1974 CIA training program in Laos

- Part of Auto Defense Choc, Laotian Civil War; Vietnam War
- Type: Irregular military training program
- Location: Laos
- Planned: January 1961
- Planned by: James William Lair
- Commanded by: Vang Pao
- Objective: Raise an irregular army of Hmong tribes
- Date: January 17, 1961—September 30, 1974
- Executed by: CIA, Operation White Star, RLA/ADC, PEO, PARU, USAID, Raven Forward Air Controllers, Air America, BirdAir, CASI
- Outcome: Guerrilla army of 30,000 troops raised; project abandoned in 1974
- Casualties: 18,000–20,000 Hmong soldiers killed Unknown number of PAVN/Pathet Lao; 50,000 civilians

Operation Momentum was a guerrilla training program during the Laotian Civil War run by the Central Intelligence Agency to raise a guerrilla force of Hmong hill-tribesmen in northeastern Laos to fight the North Vietnamese Army (PAVN) and their Pathet Lao allies. It was planned by James William Lair and carried out by the Thai Police Aerial Reinforcement Unit. Begun on 17 January 1961, the three-day Auto Defense Choc (Self Defense Shock) course graduated a clandestine guerrilla army of 5,000 warriors by 1 May, and of 9,000 by August. It scored its first success the day after the first ADC company graduated, on 21 January 1961, when 20 ADC troopers ambushed and killed 15 Pathet Lao.

The Momentum technique of parachuting in equipment to train guerrillas was successful and copied widely by Americans during the Vietnam War. The United States Special Forces used the Momentum pre-palleted equipment and their own cadre of instructors for such copycat programs as Operation Pincushion, and for organizing the Degars of South Vietnam.

The success of Operation Momentum brought about more extensive training for the Hmong and other hill tribe recruits such as the Lao Theung. Further training of Special Operating Teams of ADC graduates was begun in August 1961, with the aim of gradually replacing foreign trainers with Lao instructors. In July 1962, the International Agreement on the Neutrality of Laos put a damper on Momentum operations until the following April. During this lull, Colonel (later Major General) Vang Pao gathered five ADC companies into a battalion-sized Special Guerrilla Unit. In later years, he would take the next step of organizing makeshift regiments of SGUs.

Even as Operation Momentum expanded and spread throughout Laos, the burgeoning war in Vietnam became the focus of the American effort; the Laotian Civil War was subordinated to it. The change in emphasis can be judged by the fact that in 1967, the U.S. sank 431,000 troops into the Vietnam theater, at a fiscal cost about 700 times as great as the budget for the Lao war. As the Hmong irregulars joined the Royal Lao Army regulars in joint operations, the role of the hill tribes guerrillas began to mutate into that of light infantry defending fixed positions. The Momentum Hmong guerrillas suffered irreplaceable casualties as a result. By 1973, the Hmong had suffered 18,000 to 20,000 soldiers killed in action, with an additional 50,000 Hmong civilians killed or wounded during the civil war. On 14 and 15 May 1975, a belated U. S. aerial evacuation removed 2,500 Hmong to Thailand; however, the majority of the surviving pro-American Hmong were abandoned by the Americans.

== Background ==
As the First Indochina War ended, and the Kingdom of Laos moved towards independence, the departing French bureaucrats and soldiers were gradually replaced by Americans. Captain Kong Le was opposed to foreign involvement in his nation's affairs, so he staged a coup d'etat on 9 August 1960. A counter-coup by General Phoumi Nosavan would eclipse him on 14 December 1960. In the wake of his ascension, James William Lair of the Central Intelligence Agency secretly entered Laos. On 9 January 1961, Lair helicoptered out to Ta Vieng on the Plain of Jars to meet a young Hmong lieutenant colonel of the Royal Lao Army named Vang Pao. A Thai officer with Lair arranged a later meeting. On 11 January, Vang Pao told Lair, "Either we fight or we leave. If you give me weapons, we fight," When asked how many troops he could raise, he asked for equipment to begin training 10,000 recruits.

Lair knew that his superiors felt that the hostilities in Laos could be settled only one of two ways: either direct military intervention with American troops, or a surrender of Laos to communism. With this in mind, Lair took the offer back to his superior, Desmond Fitzgerald, with the observation that Vang Pao already had gathered 4,300 potential Hmong recruits. Lair's expressed opinion was that the Hmong were the only potential fighting force between the North Vietnamese invasion and Vientiane. He believed the Hmong would defend their way of life with ongoing guerrilla raids that would tie the Vietnamese down. Moreover, a functional guerrilla force would be best instructed by PARU because they shared a common language. The absence of Caucasian faces in the operation would guarantee plausible deniability for the covert operation. The only caveat in Lair's expertise was that the Hmong could never fight for fixed positions as infantry would; they would always need a line of retreat. As the program developed, other problems would become apparent, caused by inherent contradictions in the situation. One was the Hmong necessity to defend their families. The other was that the Hmong militia would be tasked with offensive operations in enemy territory, to expand Royalist holdings.

The proposition was approved; Lair was placed in charge, with funding coming direct from the office of the Director of Central Intelligence. Fitzgerald arranged for the first class of Hmong basic training. Dubbed Project Momentum, it supplied the military gear necessary for equipping 2,000 soldiers as an experiment. As the Programs Evaluation Office was already in place in the U.S. Embassy, it was tasked with furnishing the needed equipment from Department of Defense stores. Trainers would come from Lair's Thai Border Patrol Police, in the form of the Police Aerial Reinforcement Unit cadre. The new troops would become members of 100 man irregular military units called Auto Defense Choc (roughly, Self Defense Shock (troops)).

== Momentum builds momentum ==
When Lair helicoptered back up to the Plain of Jars, he found that Vang Pao had seven separate concentrations of Hmong males gathered on high points surrounding the Plain of Jars. Lair and Vang Pao decided that if they parachuted in training equipment to the obscure village of Ban Padong, it would take three days for communist troops to show up. A three-day curriculum was set up. After receiving palleted supplies sufficient for 300 trainees, instruction by PARU Team D began on 17 January 1961. Day one centered on the use of small arms. Lair's supplied weaponry leaned heavily toward the M1 carbine, which he felt suited to the Hmong stature. However, many trainees preferred the larger, more powerful M1 Garand; Lair increased the proportion of Garands in future supply drops. Day two featured training in laying ambushes with a squad or platoon. The final day upped the ambush practice to company level, and added on some instruction on booby traps. On 20 January, two ADC companies graduated training. The following day, 20 of the graduates ambushed a Pathet Lao patrol, killing 15.

The expected communist assailants not yet having arrived, Team D began a new training cycle. They were joined by two Central Intelligence Agency paramilitary case officers, William Young and Joe Hudachek. By mid February, five ADC companies were in action, two more were in training, and four more were being formed. Meantime, the head of the Programs Evaluation Office succeeded in being granted funding for the CIA to import 385 Thai specialists, including more PARU teams. In the short term, three more CIA paramilitaries joined Momentum from Sea Supply. Thomas Fosmire arrived, and he and PARU Team K opened the second Momentum training base at Ban Na. Jack Shirley and Tony Poe were the other two; Poe later opened the third Momentum site at Phou Nong Py, in conjunction with PARU Team M. Taking some recently trained Hmong cadre with them, Lieutenant Santi Intakon and his PARU Team E moved to Phou Vieng, cut out a crude airstrip, and started an ADC training site there.

The sixth CIA agent to report to Momentum was Lloyd C. "Pat" Landry. He went to PARU Team K; Fosmire moved on to open another training center with an airstrip at Tha Lin Noi. At about this time, PARU Team L came into Laos; they accompanied Jack Shirley to San Tiau to open a Momentum training base. Thomas Ahern left a desk job at the American Embassy to Laos to join Shirley.

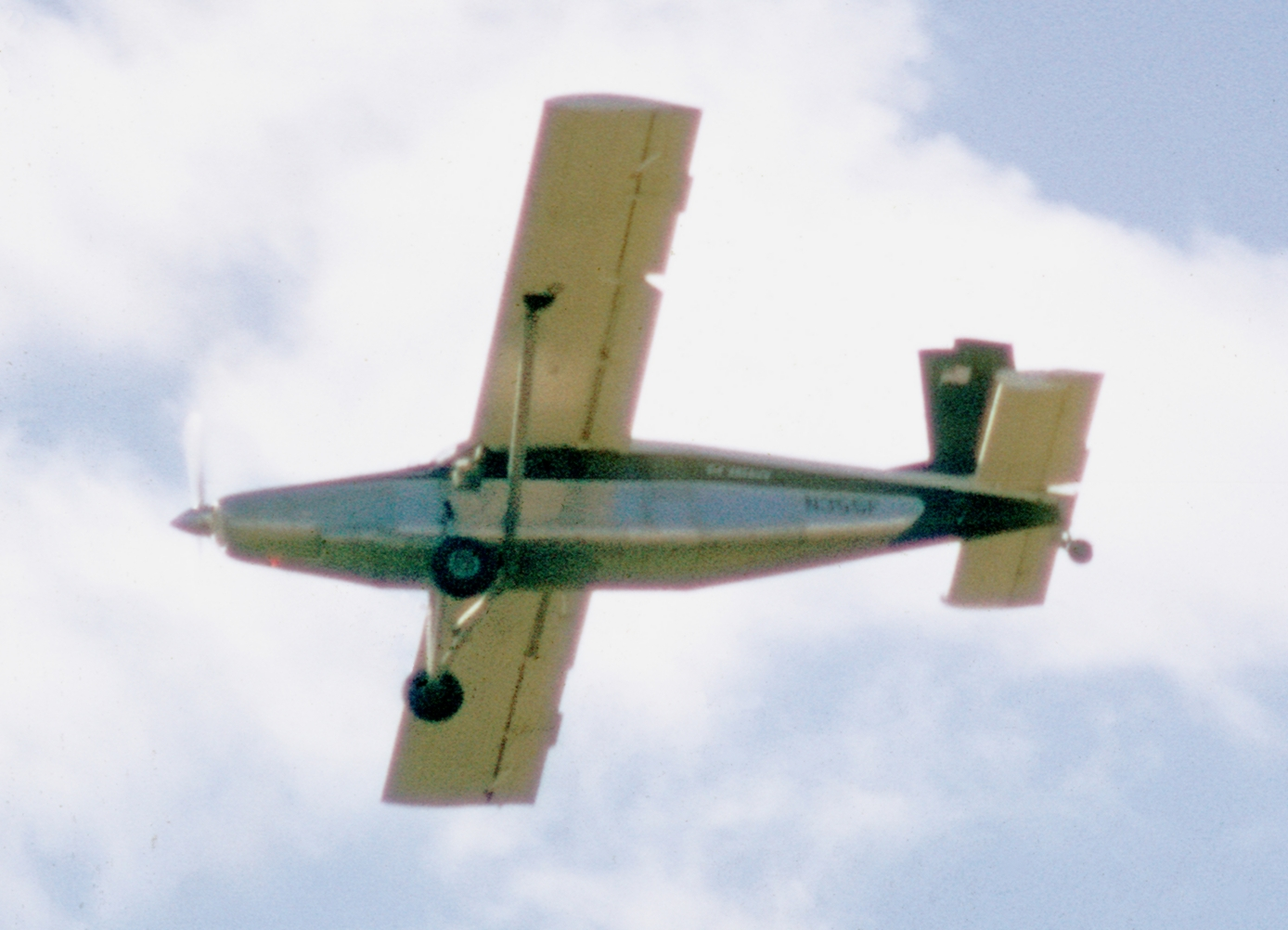
The Air America Pilatus PC-6 Porter was one of the types of STOL aircraft used to support Operation Momentum.

By 1 April, funding had been authorized for a total strength of 7,000 ADC troops. Seven CIA agents and five PARU teams had raised a guerrilla army ringing the Plain of Jars. The new militia blocked all exits from the Plain of Jars except to the southeast; that was held by Royalist regulars blocking the route to Vientiane. They were resupplied via contract with civilian airlines such as Air America and BirdAir. Supplies were landed at short takeoff and landing strips when available; otherwise they were parachuted in.

With this accomplished, two new Momentum training sites were established between the Plain of Jars and the Democratic Republic of Vietnam's border. In the meantime, the ADC guerrillas' probes provoked a PAVN assault on the San Tiau site. Three ADC companies of Hmong fought a delaying action from 19 to 23 April 1961 before destroying their heavy weapons and exfiltrating. Then, on 12 May, one of the new training camps near the Vietnamese border took heavy fire from attacking Vietnamese. Again, the Hmong fought at first, then evaded. However, three of the six PARU Team B soldiers were killed.

By May, there were 5,000 Hmong ADC soldiers in the field. The success of Momentum sparked interest from the Programs Evaluations Office, which funded the first 2,000 trainees. They insisted on inserting their Special Forces trainers into the program. Drawbacks became apparent. Besides the language barrier between the Green Berets and the Hmong, there was the added attention from the PAVN to contend with during Operation Pincushion.

By early June, the original ADC site at Padong was being shelled by 85mm field guns; it could reply with only a single 4.2 inch mortar. At 1445 hours 6 June, the PAVN roared in from the north in a ground assault. The Hmong retreated, leaving behind hand grenade booby traps littering their path through a cornfield. As the Vietnamese tripped the booby traps, Hmong troopers began to fade into the jungle. CIA agent Jack Shirley, a White Star Team, and the PARUs were picked up on 7 June and transferred some 12 km southwest to Pha Khao to resume training ADC.

By August 1961, six months after Momentum began its three-day training program, the Clandestine Army of Hmong had reached 9,000 strong; it was then slated to train an additional 3,000 recruits. At about the same time, President John F. Kennedy, acting as Commander in Chief, directed the transfer of Momentum's training programs over to the U.S. Special Forces. The Operation White Star teams moved into five Momentum training camps. The Green Berets also tried to raise their own guerrilla forces west of Route 13, which ran from Vientiane to Luang Prabang, with limited success.

== Momentum dampened ==
Also in August 1961, 120 picked candidates began training as 12 man Special Operating Teams in Hua Hin, Thailand. Chosen for educational achievement, ethnic background, and clan affiliation, they were destined to begin supplanting the Green Berets and PARU as instructors. After their December graduation, they were assigned to augment or replace PARU Teams. A second contingent of 160 Lao trainees would ship out to Hua Hin in February 1962.

Concurrently, eight teams of PARU moved northward past the Plain of Jars toward the Pathet Lao stronghold of Xam Neua. Another development was that of Special Guerrilla Units. These were formed by training ADC troopers in offensive operations at Hua Hin for four weeks. In May 1962, 500 candidates in five companies began their training in guerrilla tactics and parachuting. In June, they returned to Laos to become cadres for forming and expanding new guerrilla units. The SGUs would eventually become the size of a battalion.

In July 1962, the International Agreement on the Neutrality of Laos was signed, pledging that all foreign troops would exit Laos by 6 October 1962. Included in the U.S. exodus were all the CIA agents except Tony Poe and Vint Lawrence. Supplies to Momentum no longer contained munitions. The White Star teams training ADC troops in Operation Pincushion withdrew in September 1962. Vang Pao grew frustrated at the American restrictions. To prevent his forces from disbanding, and to preserve such fighting power as he could, he gathered the 500 SGU graduates into a single battalion-sized unit, Special Guerrilla Unit 1. Special Operating Team training, airborne training, and radio repair courses for Hmong continued in Thailand.

== Momentum revived ==
The CIA had founded a Momentum type program in South Vietnam among the Degar hill tribe; it had been handed over to the Green Berets in mid-1963. Bill Lair continued his sub rosa operations in Laos via the PARU in early 1964, extending Momentum's reach northeastward around the Plain of Jars and towards the border of the DRV. During this time, Lair made one of his infrequent trips back to the United States. He took part in a National Security Council meeting, even though he was relatively junior in status. When asked if Vang Pao was crucial to Momentum's continuance, Lair answered that there were a number of Hmong officers who could rise to command if Vang Pao became a casualty. Meanwhile, back in Laos, several ADC outposts were attacked and overrun by the communists between January and April 1964. In return, in late summer, the second SGU battalion was formed at Long Tieng.

Upon his return to Laos, Lair recruited Momentum soldiers from the largest nonaligned ethnic minority, the Lao Theung. These southern hill tribesmen were not as martial as the Hmong; while they would spy on the Vietnamese communists, they would not assault them. Operating from bases in Savannakhet and Pakse, they were on the opposite side of the Ho Chi Minh Trail from the similar program with the Degar. The vital communist stronghold and supply center of Tchepone, garrisoned by 3,000 PAVN soldiers, sat in between the Lao and Vietnamese hill tribes guerrilla sites.

Meanwhile, in northern Laos, Vang Pao had tried to counterattack in late 1964, with little success. He also renewed efforts to extend Momentum training to sites between the Plain of Jars and the Vietnamese border. Working in conjunction with the RLA, as he would for the rest of the war, he managed to reach as closely as only 13 kilometers from the border. In response, the North Vietnamese committed their most powerful force since the Battle of Luang Namtha to a mid-January 1965 offensive. While the RLA's Batallon Voluntaires 26 (Volunteer Battalion 26) retreated westward from the attacking PAVN 174th Regiment, the ADC troops hung on at Nong Houn. CIA agent Tony Poe flew in on 19 January to stiffen the resistance. On 20 January, he was wounded in the abdomen and evacuated; the Vietnamese overran Nong Houn later in the day. After that, on 9 February, they pushed SGU 1 from Houei Sai An. Stiffened by RLA reinforcements flown in from out of theater, the Hmong regrouped at Nakhang.

By early 1965, the ADC program had extended westward from Military Region 2, into Military Region 1. Even without commitment of PARU trainers or CIA agents, three centers of Hmong resistance sprang up; two were north of Nam Bac, and the other in the far northern province of Phongsaly. Additionally, in far northwestern Laos near Nam Yu, CIA agent Bill Young had his own ADC program up and running. Even as ADC training was still used, some of the guerrillas were co-opted to fill out regular RLA units. An additional impediment to ADC success in MR 1 was General Ouane Rattikone's desire to use ADC troops for opium cultivation.

By 1966, the Hmong involvement in Momentum had grown to the point that the hill tribe could no longer depend on its own gardens and herds for food. The villagers had become dependent upon U.S. Agency for International Development food drops because the farmers and shepherds had been inducted into Momentum's clandestine army. The Thai PARU working with Momentum had also begun to show wear, in their increased use of inebriants.

At this point, Momentum gained a new boss when Theodore Shackley transferred in as the CIA's Chief of Station in Laos. Shackley is credited with stating that Momentum was run like a country store, and it was his job to turn it into a supermarket. An ad hoc U.S. Air Force unit called the Raven Forward Air Controllers was founded to direct the swelling tide of airpower being unleashed in support of the Hmong and other irregulars. Rather than continuing to craft a strategy to defend Laos, the new emphasis in the war became the support of the combat in South Vietnam.

By 1967, there were 431,000 American troops stationed in Vietnam; 15,000 had already been killed in action. The fiscal year budget for that theater was about $21 billion—approximately 700 times that of the budget for the Laotian Civil War. By contrast, there were still only a relative handful of Americans in Laos, and few casualties. However, the trend toward using the guerrillas in the role of regular troops continued. Vang Pao's SGU battalions were redesignated to Bataillon Guerriers (Warrior Battalions) to reflect their new role. For the first time, they were organized into ad hoc regiment referred to as a Groupement Mobile.

== End ==
As both the war and Operation Momentum ran down, the Hmong irregulars suffered heavy casualties defending fixed positions as conventional infantry. The original arrangement that the Hmong would defend their homeland was subordinated to American interests in the Vietnam theater. Misused as light infantry instead of guerrillas, the Hmong's fighting strength was sapped by losses even as the population of new recruits dried up. Nor was it solely a case of military casualties. The Hmong families of the soldiers also suffered through repeated relocations and communist attacks.

By 1973, about 120,000 Hmong—almost half their population—were refugees within Laos. About 18,000 to 20,000 Hmong soldiers had been killed in action; the civilian toll of killed and wounded amounted to almost 50,000. The communist advances captured more and more of Laos, crowding in on the Hmong, who had no line of retreat.

Funding for Operation Momentum ended on 30 September 1974. As G. McMurtrie Godley stated about the dreadful human cost: "We used the Meo (Hmong). The rationale...was that they tied down three first-rate North Vietnamese divisions that otherwise would have been used against our men in South Vietnam. It was a dirty business."

A hasty last-minute air evacuation from Long Tieng on 14 and 15 May 1975 moved 2,500 Hmong to Thailand. However, the overwhelming majority of the Hmong were left on foot to find their way as best they could. Many of them walked south to Thailand for refuge. By the end of 1975, there were 54,000 Hmong refugees known to be in Thai refugee camps; an equal number were believed to have found shelter with relatives in northern Thailand.
