= Auto Defense Choc =

Militia training program for the Royal Lao Armed Forces

The Auto Defense de Choc (ADC) was a militia training program for the Royal Lao Armed Forces. Begun by a French military mission in 1955, its 100-man companies were placed under command of the local Military Region commander when trained. By 1 September 1959, 20 ADC companies were in training, and there were 16,000 ADC soldiers nationwide. When Central Intelligence Agency (CIA) operatives Theodore Shackley, James William Lair and others slipped into the Kingdom of Laos in the early 1960s, they instituted an American version of the ADC dependent on pre-packed airdropped materiel. Using a three-day training schedule in Operation Momentum, Shackley, Lair and others, worked with Vang Pao to raise a guerrilla force of 5,000 troops in several months.

The ADC concept's success helped it spread. The Royal Lao Government (RLG) set up its own version. U.S. Special Forces (USSF) copied the ADC for Operation White Star and Operation Pincushion, and to organize the Degar in South Vietnam. In 1967, Royal Thai Special Forces belatedly began their own ADC program along the Thai-Lao border. As the Laotian Civil War continued, ADC troops began to assume the role of regular light infantry. They were gathered into larger units such as ad hoc battalions. In many cases, the village militia was transferred away from their home villages. They were assigned to such non-guerrilla tasks as defending or attacking fixed positions. They were conscripted into regular units of the RLA. Their numbers dwindled in the confusion of warmaking; the ADC faded in importance until only 6,000 remained in service by war's end.

== The French Auto Defense de Choc ==
Although the French lost the First Indochina War, they were bound by the 1954 Geneva Agreement to provide the newly independent Kingdom of Laos with a trained military. As part of the Lao military establishment the French raised a paramilitary force, the AD Corps, in 1955. They disbanded it in 1958, only to reconstitute it the following year. The AD Corps was supposed to be a nationwide network of 16,000 volunteers for local village self-defense. Assets from an earlier Garde Nationale (National Guard) and some prior commando companies were rolled into the new organization. The Royal Lao Government (RLG) planned to use most of the AD Corps for part-time village self-defense; these were the Auto-Defense Ordinaire (Ordinary Self Defense) troops. However, some members of the new Corps were designated for full-time service against a burgeoning Pathet Lao communist movement; these were designated Auto Defense de Choc (Self-Defense Shock) troops. The 4,000 Hmong located in Xam Neua between the Pathet Lao and their North Vietnamese backers were such.

The AD Corps was designed to consist of 100-man companies. These companies contained four platoons. In turn, each platoon was supposed to have three assault squads and one heavy weapons squad. AD Corps companies were under the command of their local military region.

On 1 September 1959, RLG plans called for creation of 20 Auto Defense companies by month's end, with an additional 20 companies trained by the end of October. The various military regions of Laos were training recruits: Military Region 1 had 5,000 trainees; MR 2 had 3,700; MR 3 had 3,000; MR 4 had another 3,000 recruits; MR 5 had 1,300.

== The American Auto Defense de Choc ==
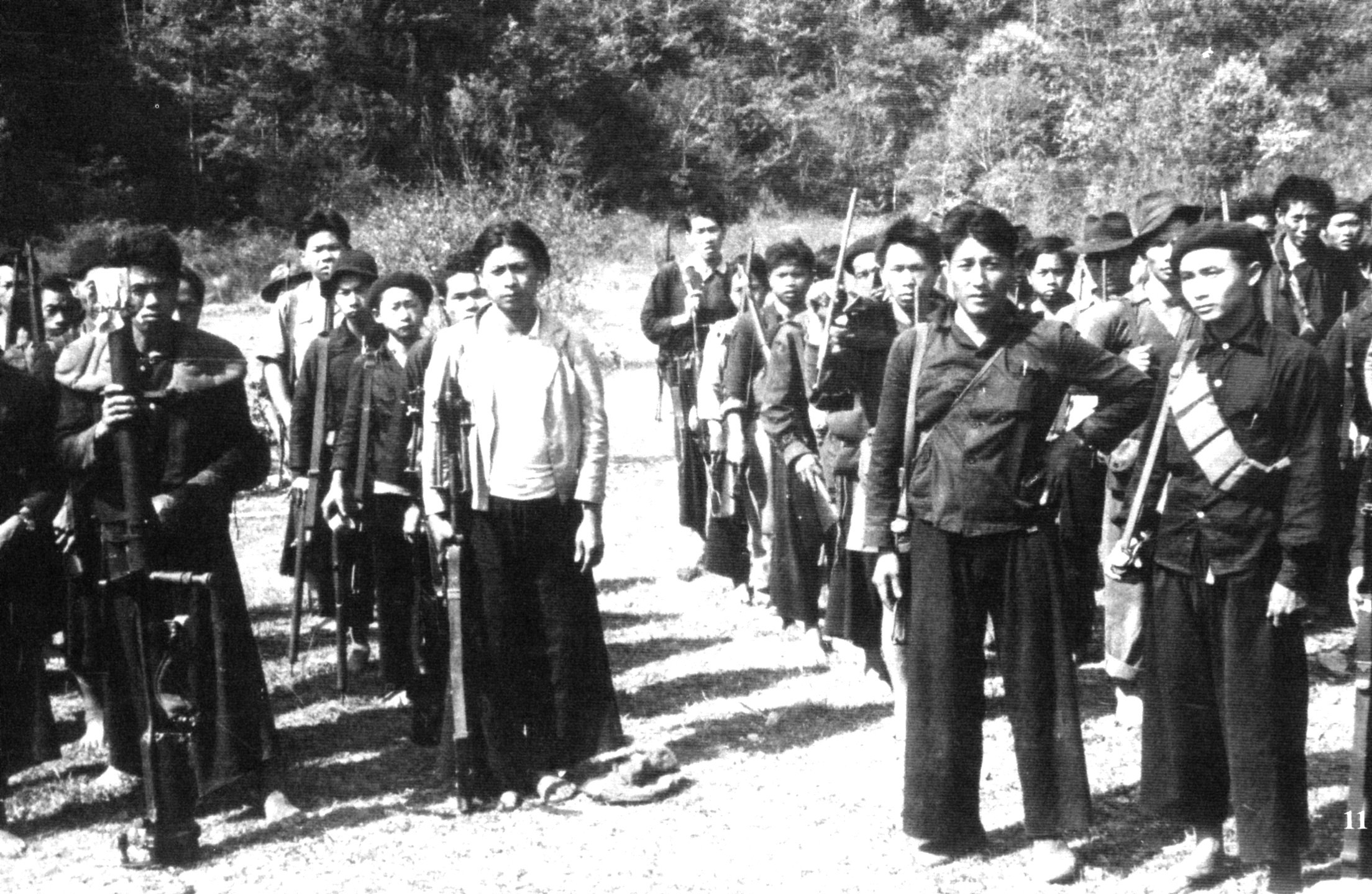
A Auto Defense de Choc (ADC) Hmong guerrilla company assembles at Phou Vieng, Spring 1961.

=== Operation Momentum ===
The Central Intelligence Agency's undercover entry into Laos would result in an American version of the ADC. CIA agent Bill Lair contacted Vang Pao in early January 1961. The Hmong officer offered to raise and train a clandestine army of 10,000 hill tribes guerrillas via the ADC program. Lair, who had trained the Thai Police Aerial Resupply Unit to Special Forces standards, got permission from his seniors to staff Operation Momentum and supply it from the Programs Evaluation Office. The first CIA-backed training session for ADC was at Padong, located back in the hills 17 kilometers south of the communist-occupied Plain of Jars. Key to the success of this ADC program was the pre-packed supplies that could be parachuted into obscurely located training camps. The ADC program was relatively inexpensive; for instance, the Lao soldiers were paid about ten cents per day.

Because the training was located a three-day march from the nearest People's Army of Vietnam (PAVN) troops, a three-day curriculum was set up. On day one, three parachuted pre-packed loads were broken down and issued to recruits; they then learned to use rifles and light crew-served weapons. Day two saw the new soldiers learn the skills of ambushing the enemy; first they practiced setting squad-size ambushes, then moved up to using platoons. The third day covered squad, platoon, and company-size ambushes, as well as booby traps. The first two ADC companies in Momentum graduated on 20 January 1961. The following day, 20 of the graduates ambushed and killed 15 Lao communist soldiers. By the 22nd, both companies cut Route 4 20 kilometers south of Xieng Khouang.

Building on that success, more ADC companies began training, while more American support was poured into the ADC program. As ADC companies graduated, they dispersed and trained other troops. More training camps were opened, being located to surround the Plain of Jars and to interpose between the PDJ and the Democratic Republic of Vietnam border. On 24 February 1961, 385 Thai technicians and specialists were authorized to be in Laos by the end of the month. PARU teams were rapidly infiltrated into Laos to serve as trainers. Six more CIA agents arrived to aid Bill Lair in supervising the PARU. Among them were Tony Poe, Bill Young, and Tom Fosmire.

With aerial support from both Air America and BirdAir, Lima sites began to be carved out of the jungled ridges of Laos so that short takeoff and landing aircraft could resupply ADC camps. Even as the ADC effort burgeoned, communist troops began to locate and attack some camps, though with no real result. Instead of defending the bases, the Lao irregulars simply moved and started over, littering their line of retreat with booby traps. Within two months of their founding, by the end of March 1961, Momentum ADC companies ringed the PDJ; they mustered 5,000 troops. By that time, they were funded to raise a total of 7,000 irregulars.

=== Operation Pincushion and road watch teams ===
The successful ADC effort also attracted another sort of support. The U.S. Army pressured the CIA into allowing the introduction of Operation White Star training teams into the ADC program. The White Star teams were subsets of U.S. Special Forces A Teams. They founded one such ADC program apart from Momentum, placing it on the Bolovens Plateau in southern Laos, and dubbed it Operation Pincushion. However, the Green Berets did not enjoy quite the training success as the PARU had. They found that their raw Hune recruits were not as aggressive as the Hmong. Just as the Hmong were, the Hune were scorned by lowland Lao, and thus neglected by the Royalist government. The new Hune soldiers had difficulty loading the M1 Garand. They also lacked the physical strength to hand carry the 57 mm recoilless rifle from place to place. They also lacked the ethnic cohesiveness of the Hmong. Out of the 12 ADC companies trained in Pincushion, half of one deserted, and another was wracked to uselessness by internal dissension.

Operation White Star was closed out by 28 September 1962, in accordance with the International Agreement on the Neutrality of Laos; the Green Berets left Laos. They left behind 12 subterranean caches stocked with ammunition, weapons cleaning supplies, rice, and grenades in the vicinity of Paksong and Houei Kong.

Another operation in the Laotian panhandle was the road watch teams. The original ADC program in southern Laotian Khammouane Province began in 1959; it produced 1,765 militiamen for the RLG. In December 1960, the CIA-sponsored PARU Team C took over training to revive the ADC program. After Team C was pressured out of the province by enemy activity in February 1962, CIA agent Mike Deuel was left with nine ADC companies. Based at Phou Sang, he used them as road watch teams spying upon the Ho Chi Minh Trail during May and June; then PAVN troops closing in forced an evacuation and closure of the base. Deuel would reconstitute his road watch program in October 1963 as Operation Hardnose.

== Further developments of ADC ==
While Operation White Star was concluded as part of the American military leaving Laos, Operation Momentum went into suspended animation. Nevertheless, the CIA tried to maintain contact with the 13,500 ADC troops it had trained in northern Laos. Much to the disgust of Vang Pao, the CIA's supply of munitions to his Hmong guerrillas was suspended. To conserve his trained manpower, he gathered 500 of his ADC guerrillas into the first of his Special Guerrilla Units (SGU). From this time on, the ADC forces would dwindle in importance drained off its best troops into organized larger units; within a year, a third of the 30,000 ADC soldiers were serving in SGUs.

Efforts also began to replace the foreign instructors with Lao; the new training took place at Phitsanulok, Thailand. The Lao Special Operating Teams were modeled after the PARU, but consisted of 12 man teams. On 10 April 1963, President John F. Kennedy ordered resumption of U.S. support by the newly established Requirements Office to the ADCs.

By this time, many non-CIA ADC units were assigned to work as militia in conjunction with the Royal Lao Army (RLA). They were spread out among all five Laotian military regions. In the northwest, Military Region 1 hosted 35 ADC units. In the northeast, around the Plain of Jars, MR 2 held 23 ADC units besides the independent Hmong companies. MR 3, the north end of the Lao panhandle, had 34 ADC units on strength. South of it, MR 4 contained 21 ADC units; that was not including the Pincushion dozen, which had disbanded. Military Region 5, around Vientiane, contained only 9 ADC units.

In January and February 1964, the ADC defended three of its sites from fixed positions as though they were light infantry. Four other sites were evacuated under attack. In April, the ADC suffered another setback as the PAVN finally overran Phou Nong. For Operation Triangle in late July 1964, CIA-backed ADC units were attached to regular units of the RLA. On 29 July, elements of Special Guerrilla Unit 1, as well as a Hmong ADC company, swooped in unexpectedly via helicopter to capture the road intersection that was the Royalist objective, thus ending the battle.

For the first few months of 1965, Vang Pao planned an expansion of the Operation Momentum ADC program to the north and west of the Pathet Lao capital of Xam Neua. To do this, in a break from prior practice, the Hmong general transferred some of his ADC troops away from their home villages. Some of these ADC troops were dispersed in a skirmish line forward of the troops. The end result was a force of 5,120 ADC troopers, backed by 5,500 ADO militia stationed in friendly villages. In a further blurring of the distinction between ADC guerrillas and Lao regulars, the RLA began to skim off promising militia men to beef up Royalist units.

== ADC absorbed ==
As the war continued, the ADC program still ran as designed in Military Region 1 in far western and northwestern Laos. Belatedly begun by Royal Thai Army (RTA) instructors in late 1967 near Xieng Lom, it graduated its first three companies by 31 October 1967. They swept southwest, pushing communist guerrillas ahead of them. The RTA crossed the border into Laos and attacked the band of communists.

However, Forces Guerrilla West, the western ADC program, suffered numerous difficulties by 1969. The CIA discovery of the large number of "phantom troops" carried on payroll led to reforms, including arrest of corrupt commanders and retraining of existing ADC. In one case, only 45 of 300 troops were present in one base. As Hmong recruits became scarce, attempts were made to train other ethnic minorities. Animosity was aroused by this, and dissension arose even to the point of mutiny. As a result, 300 dissident Hmong ADC troopers were relocated to Military Region 2.

Matters were somewhat better in Forces Guerrilla Northwest, which was based at Nam Yu on the Chinese border. CIA agent Tony Poe oversaw junior agents assigned to work with various ethnic minorities. By the time Poe departed in 1970, ADC companies segregated by ethnicity had been trained and were being formed into makeshift Special Guerrilla Units (SGU) battalions.

Nor were Nam Yu's the only ADC irregulars being co-opted into regular service. In Military Region 2, they were stationed at Phou Pha Thi as defensive light infantry to guard Lima Site 85 and took part in the Battle of Lima Site 85. Elsewhere in Laos, ADC units were part of Kou Kiet, Operation Counterpunch, Operation Maeng Da, and Operation Honorable Dragon. In one case, even the ADC militia used for home defense was pressed into regular offensive operations in Military Region 4 for Operation Diamond Arrow.

As the end of hostilities neared, the Royal Lao Government still carried 6,000 ADC troopers in its order of battle.

== See also ==
- North Vietnamese invasion of Laos
- Laos Memorial
- Lao Veterans of America
- Laotian Civil War
- Royal Lao Armed Forces
