= Battle of Ban Pa Dong =

- Part of Laotian Civil War; Vietnam War
Date	31 January – 6 June 1961
Location	19.10344°N 103.11071°E; Ban Pa Dong, in central northern Laos
Result	Communists capture Royalist guerrilla training base

Belligerents
Kingdom of Laos; Supported by United States	(Laos) Pathet Lao; People's Army of Vietnam; Supported by: Soviet Union; People's Republic of China

Commanders and leaders
Vang Pao	

Units involved
Hmong guerrilla trainees 4 howitzers 2 mortars	One Pathet Lao battalion 17 75mm howitzers

Casualties and losses
Substantial	Unknown

The Battle of Ban Pa Dong was fought between 31 January and 6 June 1961 in Ban Pa Dong, the Kingdom of Laos. Troops from the People's Army of Vietnam (PAVN) and the Pathet Lao attacked Hmong recruits being trained as Auto Defense Choc guerrillas via Operation Momentum. Although the Hmong made the tactical error of defending a fixed position, their eventual escape from the communist invaders left their fledgling L'Armee Clandestine intact and able to wage war for the Royal Lao Government. However, they abandoned four howitzers and two mortars to the victorious Vietnamese communists. The partisans had also set a deleterious precedent for themselves with their defense of a fixed position.

== Background ==
As the First Indochina War ended, and the Kingdom of Laos moved towards independence, the departing French bureaucrats and soldiers were gradually replaced by Americans. Captain Kong Le, who was opposed to foreign involvement in his nation's affairs, staged a coup d'etat on 9 August 1960. A counter-coup by General Phoumi Nosavan would eclipse him on 16 December 1960 at the Battle of Vientiane. In the wake of Phoumi's ascension, James William Lair of the Central Intelligence Agency secretly entered Laos. On 9 January 1961, Lair helicoptered out to Ta Vieng on the Plain of Jars to meet a young Hmong lieutenant colonel of the Royal Lao Army named Vang Pao. A Thai officer with Lair arranged a later meeting. On 11 January, Vang Pao told Lair, "Either we fight or we leave. If you give me weapons, we fight," When asked how many troops he could raise, he asked for equipment to begin training 10,000 recruits.

Lair knew that his superiors felt that the hostilities in Laos could be settled only one of two ways: either direct military intervention with American troops, or a surrender of Laos to communism. With this in mind, Lair took the offer back to his superior, Desmond Fitzgerald, with the observation that Vang Pao already had gathered 4,300 potential Hmong recruits. Lair's expressed opinion was that the Hmong were the only potential fighting force between the North Vietnamese invasion and Vientiane. He believed the Hmong would defend their way of life with ongoing guerrilla raids that would tie the Vietnamese down. Moreover, a functional guerrilla force would be best instructed by Thai PARU because they shared a commonly intelligible language. The absence of Caucasian faces in the operation would guarantee plausible deniability for the covert operation. The only caveat in Lair's expertise was that the Hmong could never fight for fixed positions as infantry would; they would always need a line of retreat.

The proposition was approved; Lair was placed in charge, with funding coming direct from the office of the Director of Central Intelligence. Fitzgerald arranged for the first class of Hmong basic training. Dubbed Project Momentum, it supplied the military gear necessary for equipping 2,000 soldiers as an experiment. As the Programs Evaluation Office was already in place in the U.S. Embassy, it was tasked with furnishing the needed equipment from Department of Defense stores. Trainers came from Lair's PARU cadre. The new troops became members of 100-man irregular units called Auto Defense Choc (roughly, Self Defense Shock (troops)).

== Operation Momentum begins ==
The village of Ban Pa Dong was selected as the base for covert training of Hmong guerrillas for several reasons. Most pressing, it was out of reach of enemy action—barely. The Royal Lao Army (RLA) had just abandoned the Routes 7 and 13 intersection at nearby Sala Phou Khoun. Captain Kong Le's newly formed Forces Armées Neutralistes (Neutral Armed Forces)(FAN) was establishing a presence eastward across the Plain of Jars. The Pathet Lao were intent on cooperation with FAN. There was a very real risk attached to failure of Operation Momentum—attraction of communist retribution upon the Hmong populace.

There was a grass airstrip at Ban Pa Dong, and some old wooden buildings that had been built by the French. It was sited on a ridgeline, at 4,500 feet (1,400 m) elevation, about 13 kilometres (8.1 mi) south of the Plain of Jars. The altitude would prove problematic for air operations, as an early helicopter crash showed. Flying in to begin the first Operation Momentum instruction cycle, the Air America H-34 carrying Lair ran out of lift to clear a ridge-line. After clipping trees, the helicopter tumbled down a hillside; there were no serious casualties except the demolished helicopter.

The village had a deep emotional resonance with the Hmong, who traditionally traded their cash crop of opium there. It reputedly reminded them of a glorious past in which Hmong were literate urbanites. Vang Pao's call for recruits rallied entire Hmong villages to Padong so the eligible males could undergo guerrilla training. A common attitude among the recruits was, "Just once in my life I want to kill a Vietnamese. Then I can die happy."

The original basis of Momentum was the use of a three-day threshold of opportunity to train Hmong guerrillas before the PAVN could attack from the Plain of Jars. The Hmong were trained in classic hit-and-run guerrilla tactics, with no intent of having the nomadic warriors settle in to defend territory. Their opponent, the PAVN, was a highly trained force, with its infantry reinforced by artillery. It seemed they would be unstoppable if they attacked. However, it was a battalion-size contingent of Pathet Lao who made the first move; the week after Momentum training began, they penetrated within 3,500 metres (3.5 km) meters of the training site. By 31 January, early graduates of the ADC program had patrolled 30 kilometres (19 mi) into enemy territory, killing a dozen Pathet Lao and bringing back eight captured weapons.

When PAVN did make their move, they brought artillery. They had to cross one intermediate ridge as they moved southward from the Plain; Padong was on the next ridge. Initially, the Hmong held that intermediate ridge against PAVN assaults. PAVN artillery began to shell the Hmong. Return fire from a single 4.2 inch mortar that had been flown in to reinforce the Hmong was insufficient. U.S. Army Captain William Chance, who had accompanied the mortar, advised Vang Pao to abandon the position. The head of the Programs Evaluation Office, General Andrew Boyle, also believed Ban Pa Dong should not be held. In response, Vang Pao had some Hmong dependents hike two days south to safer ground at Pha Khao.

On 3 May 1961, a truce settled over all of Laos except for Ban Pa Dong. Shelling continued there. Ten days later, in a demonstration of their relentless tactics versus fixed positions, the PAVN overran and wiped out the Royalists at Muong Ngat some 125 kilometres (78 mi) east of the Momentum site. Two days later, on 15 May, the PAVN took heavy losses while capturing the intermediate ridge shielding Ban Pa Dong. That same day, Vang Pao estimated 100 artillery shells hit Ban Pa Dong. The PAVN built roads for forward movement of their artillery, and sited it in the lee of the ridge, protected from the Hmong mortar. On 26 and 27 May, Ban Pa Dong took almost 400 rounds of incoming fire. There were 17 75mm cannons firing at the guerrilla base.

An attempt was made to set up an overwatch position over Ban Pa Dong on the summit that overshadowed it. However, lack of water foiled the trial. The later discovery of a field phone line on the peak indicated enemy presence. In another approach to a heartier defense, 225 reinforcements were flown in. The Royal Lao Air Force flew 113 hours in support missions with their T-6 Texans in their fledgling combat efforts. However, as they were both inexperienced and armed with only guns and rockets, they were ineffectual.

As local tribes burned off undergrowth to clear fields for their slash-and-burn agriculture, visibility worsened, hampering aerial support for the Hmong. On 31 May, an incoming Air America H-34 helicopter crashed, killing all hands. The superstitious Hmong saw the fatal accident as the latest instance of bad luck. Small packets of ADC troopers began to trickle away from Ban Pa Dong.

== Fall of Ban Pa Dong ==
Dense fog settled about Ban Pa Dong on 3 June, and clung on for three days. Under this cover, enemy infantry infiltrated past Hmong outposts. On 6 June, accurate artillery fire kept the guerrillas crouched in fighting positions. There are two slightly differing accounts of the end of the battle, but both agree a radio intercept sparked it.

According to one version, the forwarded radio intercept came in at 15:00 hours, warning of an imminent assault on a company posted about 2 kilometres (1.2 mi) south of the Lima 5 airstrip. With the field phone line to that position severed by artillery, a company of Royalist regulars were sent to both warn and reinforce the southern position. Once the regulars were out of view, they fled. The unwarned guerrilla company suffered about ten dead and 15 wounded during the surprise attack, and withdrew to the main force. Another, more dramatic version, said CIA agent Jack Shirley was passed information from an intercepted PAVN radio message that the PAVN assault was due in ten minutes, at 16:00 hours. In either case, an immediate evacuation began. Shirley, Chance and his U.S. Special Forces Team, and the PARU cadre hurriedly destroyed any military gear too heavy to carry, and herded the Hmong away from the flaming village.

Carrying their wounded, with the Americans and the PARUs as a rear guard and heavy small arms fire popping overhead, 400 to 500 Hmong of all ages and both genders began a dispersal into the gloom. At midnight, attracted by flashlights used by some of the Hmong, the PAVN mortared the escaping column. Fortunately for the Hmong, the muddy earth absorbed most of the explosives' force. At daybreak, Air America H-34s showed up to evacuate the PARU, Shirley, and Vang Pao's wife. The Hmong may have lost Ban Pa Dong, but they had not suffered overwhelming casualties in the process. Vang Pao subsequently shifted his headquarters to Long Tieng, which would remain the guerrilla headquarters until war's end.

== Aftermath ==
Losing Ban Pa Dong was a serious defeat for the Hmong guerrillas. They left so hastily that they did not disable their four howitzers and two mortars, but left them usable for the communist victors. The guerrillas had also suffered a substantial number of casualties.

The results of this first defense of a fixed position did not deter Vang Pao from repeating this error in future years, as at the battle of Na Khang. Nevertheless, Ban Pa Dong had served an important purpose; the first 5,000 ADC troopers trained there were the basis of Vang Pao's L'Armee Clandestine. They had ringed the Plain of Jars with guerrilla bases before Ban Pa Dong was overrun.

In April 1963, the Hmong would recapture Ban Pa Dong. It would serve as a defensive base throughout the remainder of the Laotian Civil War.

== See also ==
- Ban Phou Pheung Noi
