= Wapi Project =

- Part of Laotian Civil War; Supported by Operation Pincushion
- Type: Civic action program, military training program
- Location: Southern Laos
- Planned: Early 1963
- Planned by: Phasouk Somly Rasphakdi, U. S. Embassy in Laos, CIA
- Commanded by: Phasouk Somly Rasphakdi, CIA, USAID
- Objective: Support agricultural cooperatives, train defensive militia units
- Date: Late 1963—mid 1967
- Executed by: Phasouk Somly Rasphakdi, CIA, USAID
- Outcome: Program highly successful, but ultimately abandoned in favor of other projects

The Wapi Project was a civic action program originated by the Royal Lao Government; it was performed in Military Region 4 of Laos from late 1963 through 1967. Notable for being among the first integrated programs to offer integrated services to the Lao Theung populace of southern Laos, it became a victim of its own success. Its lean efficiency led to its being crowded out of funding by more expensive programs.

== Background ==
Beginning in 1950, the United States gradually slid into supporting a proxy war in the Kingdom of Laos. In time, it took over support of the Royal Lao Government and the Royal Lao Armed Forces. The latter was centered in five separate military regions, with few lines of communication to link them. As a result, the generals in command of military regions tended to act autonomously from one another or from a central command.

During the Laotian Civil War, the Royal Lao Army in Military Region 4 of Laos chose a policy of minimal aggression toward the communist troops shielding the Ho Chi Minh Trail in the eastward reaches of the MR.

== Mu Ban Samaki becomes the Wapi Project ==
Laotian General Phasouk Somly Rasphakdi, who commanded MR 4, began investigating possibilities for a civic action program in Wapikhamthong Province as early as 1963. The development zone envisioned by the general would stretch from the Mekong River eastward through the lowlands to Salavane. Its populace was largely Lao Theung hostile to the Royal Lao Government. It was a fertile rice growing area.

On 25 June 1963, U.S. President John F. Kennedy approved National Security Action Memorandum 249. One of its provisions called for the Central Intelligence Agency to increase their Auto Defense Choc troops to 23,000 militia. The new ADC would be used to link up zones of Royal Lao Government influence and to safeguard the villages within them, similar to the Strategic Hamlet Program in Vietnam.

It took two years to fully involve Americans from the U.S. Embassy in the concept that was dubbed Mu Ban Samaki by the Lao. The proposed Auto Defense Choc (ADC) program would train militia that would provide security to new assistance programs in schooling, public health, and agriculture. The first pilot program, launched in late 1963, was concentrated in six locations scattered along the Mekong Valley from Sayaboury to Attopeu. It was run by a disorganized committee of U.S. Embassy staff members. By mid-1964, the pilot project in MR 4 at Houei Kong was the only one prospering, due to its unitary command and security from the 400 remaining militia from Operation Pincushion. At the same time, overall security in MR 4 was diminished when an 1,800 man regiment of regulars was transferred out to join Operation Triangle on the Plain of Jars in Military Region 2.

The transformation of Mu Ban Samaki into the Wapi Project was based on explicitly linking the newly offered civic services to a militia effort to defend them. The Wapi Project was offered to a population of about 120,000. Half of those were estimated to be communist sympathizers; however military intelligence reported only 300 communist guerrillas among them. Even pro-communist village leaders were swayed by such improvements as agricultural cooperatives. The Central Intelligence Agency (CIA) and U.S. Agency for International Development (USAID) cooperated in the effort. This made it among the first integrated civic aid projects in Indochina, and it ran at a relatively low cost. The ADC training camp opened at a site dubbed PS 18 in November 1965; it would train militia for a year. One of the three CIA case agents assigned to the ADC effort had experience dealing with Lao Theung from a previous assignment with Operation Pincushion.

In April 1965, the Wapi Project doubled in size as it extended into the Sedone Valley. The communists there ruled by coercion, so the new government project found fertile ground for its expansion. By June 1966, the Wapi Project had pacified 5,400 square kilometers of Laos. However, by the end of 1966, with American interest fading, Phasouk also turned back toward military action. However, he did manage to evade joining the CIA's nascent road watch program, fearing the distraction from the Wapi Project.

During the first half of 1967, new CIA Chief of Station Theodore Shackley withdrew the Agency's support, dooming it. Ironically, the Wapi Project's efficiency doomed it in the battle for budgeting, as more elaborate efforts with larger budgets choked it out of existence.

== Aftermath ==
The militia, which had been raised for home defense, were pressed into offensive service in Special Guerrilla Units. They did not make very determined soldiers.

In March 1968, Pathet Lao troops moved in to commandeer the rice harvest in the old Project Wapi area. The Lao communists propagandized against the remaining effects of the Project.
