= Operation Triangle =

Military operation of the Laotian civil war

- Part of Laotian Civil War
Date	19–29 July 1964
Location	Muang Soui Valley and Sala Phou Khoun, Laos
Result	Royal Lao/Neutralistes victory
Territorial changes	Royal Lao Army and Forces Armées Neutralistes capture Sala Phou Khoun road junction; Pathet Lao maintains control of Phou Kout

Belligerents
Kingdom of Laos; Forces Armées Neutralistes; Thailand; Supported by United States	(Laos) Pathet Lao

Commanders and leaders
(Laos) Souvanna Phouma (Laos) Kouprasith Abhay; Kong Le (United States) Leonard S. Unger; Tony Poe	N/A

Units involved
(Laos) Group Mobile 16 (Laos) Group Mobile 11 (Laos) Group Mobile 17 (Laos) Three ADC battalions Paratroop Battalion 2 (Thailand) Thai artillery battalion Thai air support (Laos) RLAF air support (United States) Raven FAC	N/A

Operation Triangle was a military operation of the Laotian Civil War staged from 19—29 July 1964. Although planned by the General Staff of the Royal Lao Army, it was subject to American approval because the RLA depended on the Americans for finances, supplies, and munitions. Operation Triangle was an ambitious undertaking dependent on martial skills unfamiliar to the Lao. It not only called for coordination of infantry, artillery, and tactical air strikes among forces of three different nationalities; as a covert operation, it also had to have plausible deniability.

On 26 June 1964, American ambassador to Laos Leonard Unger was ambivalent about Operation Triangle's chances of success, but felt the opportunity for victory too good to resist. The planning of the military operation may have been local; however, approval to proceed had to come from the White House, where President Lyndon Baines Johnson was monitoring the situation. In any case, it was planned that three Royal Lao Army columns would converge on the intersection of Routes 7 and 13 in Laos, trapping a Lao communist force. With any luck, the highly strategic Plain of Jars would be left exposed to Royal Lao Government occupation.

Despite the RLA's recent losses at Namtha and Lak Sao, the operation was approved. After some weather delays, the operation kicked off on 19 July 1964. One Royalist column left Luang Prabang headed south towards the road intersection at Sala Phou Khoun. Another headed north from Vientiane. The third column moved westward from Muang Soui on the edge of the Plain of Jars.

Stiffened by American forward air controllers, with air power and Thai artillery blasting the way open, the columns closed in on Sala Phou Khoun. On 28 July, two of the columns regrouped just outside the objective. While they coordinated their final attack, Central Intelligence Agency paramilitary officer Tony Poe led an impromptu heliborne assault by Hmong irregulars that occupied the vacant road junction on 29 July.

The Royalist victory was capped when they hauled off considerable military stores abandoned by the fleeing communists, including half a dozen armored cars and eight artillery pieces. However, the route to the Plain of Jars was still blocked by communist forces. As a result, there were hard feelings on part of the RLA regulars, who felt cheated of their triumph. Nor was that the only factor dampening Royalist morale; the Tonkin Gulf Incident of 2 August that officially began the Vietnam War immediately overshadowed Operation Triangle.

== Background ==
The Laotian Civil War came about as the United States moved in to take the place of the French administrators departing Laos as a result of the 1954 Geneva Conference. The American embassy to Laos concealed the resultant American military mission to the Kingdom of Laos from 1955 onwards. Faced with an escalating communist insurgency backed by the Democratic Republic of Vietnam, the Royal Lao Government defended itself at the battles of Luang Namtha and Lak Sao, only to lose badly. By May 1964, the communist insurgents had captured the highly strategic Plain of Jars, although they were surrounded by a guerrilla army sponsored by the Central Intelligence Agency. The dry season from October to May favored the road-bound communist forces; aerial support turned the advantage to the Royalists during the rainy season from June to September. Thus began the seesaw pattern of offensives and counter-offensives that would rage throughout northern Laos for the next few years.

Laotian Prime Minister Souvanna Phouma was troubled by the increasing belligerence of the Pathet Lao communists in his country. Buoyed by an increase in Royal Lao Air Force strength, he approved the planning of Operation Triangle by the Lao General Staff. Although a limited military operation aimed at a stranded pocket of enemy troops, he hoped it would be the preliminary success needed to recapture the Plain of Jars.

On 13 June, the RLAF flew 17 sorties against Pathet Lao artillery and antiaircraft guns on Phou Kout Mountain menacing Neutralist positions near Muang Soui. Due to an inadequate forward air control system, some of the ordnance struck friendly troops. Although this disclosed a dangerous shortcoming in the Lao military's air management, General Thao Ma, commander of the RLAF, refused to supply Air Liaison Officers to direct the RLAF T-28 Trojans for the planned Lao attack. In fact, Ma transferred nine of his 20 T-28s south to Savannakhet, moving them out of possible range of targets on the Plain of Jars. Arranging air support for the upcoming Operation Triangle was thus left to the air attaché, Colonel Robert Tyrell. Two American pilots from Project Waterpump in Udorn, Thailand were forwarded to the Neutralists to fly O-1 Bird Dogs in their support, but their efforts were foiled by restrictions imposed by American ambassador Leonard Unger. Nevertheless, operational planning continued.

== Planning and preparation ==
At a meeting on 23 June 1964, the Lao General Staff approved the upcoming operation. Operation Triangle (Lao name Sam Sone, Three Arrows) was designed as a three pronged attack by armed columns of the Royal Lao Armed Forces converging on enemy units occupying a vital road junction. Route 13 was the only road running northward between Vientiane and Luang Prabang. At its approximate midpoint, Route 7 branched to the east to cross the Plain of Jars into the Democratic Republic of Vietnam. Royal Lao Government units were tasked to converge on Sala Phou Khoun at the 7/13 junction from their starting points at Vientiane, Luang Prabang, and Muang Soui. The initial deployment of Royalist and Neutralist troops would begin on 1 July, with the offensive kicking off on the 7th. Notable was the airlifting of three battalions of troops numbering 1,800 soldiers into northern Laos from the south; Royal Lao Army battalions usually remained in their assigned Military Regions. A total of ten battalions were tasked for the operation.

At the Sala Phou Khoun intersection, there were believed to be three Pathet Lao battalions armed with some anti-aircraft guns and two armored cars. With Kong Le's Forces Armées Neutralistes - FAN (Neutralist Armed Forces) blocking Route 7 at Muang Soui, the Lao communist supply line was interdicted, and they were short of supplies and in low spirits. However, by late June it was doubted that operational security could keep the RLG plans secret; if the Pathet Lao were tipped off, they might reinforce with North Vietnamese regulars.

The U.S. Embassy, which supplied and trained the Royalists and Neutralists, was equivocal about the attack. The projected manpower odds were six to one favoring the RLG. Ambassador Unger noted that success was chancy, and that the overt American action involved might call attention to the U.S. violation of the International Agreement on the Neutrality of Laos. He thought even success might bring "bitter criticism" upon the Lao government and himself. The 26 June 1964 assessment by the Embassy stated that the Pathet Lao's "exposed position and other difficulties create an opportunity rarely encountered in Laos. Failure to take advantage of it might be nearly as bad psychologically as trying and failing." Despite this wishy-washy estimate, and the RLG failure in the recent Battles of Lak Sao and Luang Namtha, the Embassy favored Operation Triangle. Unger was told that President Lyndon Baines Johnson was personally monitoring the worth of the operation. The President's approval was not the only Washington influence on the operation; upper level bureaucrats were also involved in managing it.

Major problems loomed in the planning. There was not only the complexity of coordinating three columns from different armed forces; there was also a need for coordination with imported Thai artillery units and the Royal Lao Air Force. This led to 11 American advisers being sneaked into Laos to help the Lao in this effort. However, preparations went forward with the Requirements Office issuing fresh uniforms and weapons to RLG units. On 29 June 1964, the U.S. government approved Operation Triangle. That same day, the contract was let for resupply of the operation by the Central Intelligence Agency's proprietary airline, Air America. It called for aerial reconnaissance by Air America, the daily delivery of 23 tons of supplies to the columns, and napalm for arming the RLAF's T-28 Trojans.

On 4 July, the 279-man Thai artillery battalion arrived at Muang Soui from Korat with one 155 mm howitzer and five 105 mm howitzers. They had been brought in because the Neutralist gunners were incapable of serving their own cannons. Bad weather intervened to delay arrival of the regimental-sized reinforcements of Group Mobile 16 (Mobile Group 16) at Muang Soui until 15 July; they were needed to prevent the possibility of fleeing Pathet Lao fleeing down Route 7 and overrunning the Neutralist outpost.

== The offensive ==
The Pathet Lao staged a pre-emptive regimental attack on Neutralist headquarters at Muang Soui, supported by 85 mm and 105 mm artillery. They were repulsed by RLAF T-28 strikes. The communists withdrew to Phou Kout Mountain. Its 400-meter elevation commanded the eastern end of the Muang Soui Valley.

On 19 July, the offensive kicked off under command of General Kouprasith Abhay. Group Mobile 11 (Mobile Group 11) traipsed south on Route 13 from Luang Prabang. Pushing against little opposition, they captured a 105 mm howitzer, an 81mm mortar, and nine Pathet Lao soldiers. Meanwhile, Group Mobile 17 (Mobile Group 17) accompanied FAN forces northward toward the junction. Also on the 19th, GM 16 pushed westwards, screened by about 1,200 rounds of Thai artillery fire and 32 bombing sorties by RLAF T-28s. GM 16 covered a third of the distance from Muang Soui to their objective in just two days. Simultaneously, following heavy T-28 strikes, the Neutralist Bataillon Parachutistes 2 (Paratroop Battalion 2) from Muang Soui began its attacks on Phou Kout.

Despite this early promise, from 21 July onwards GM 16 slowed its march westward on the poorly constructed Route 7 toward Sala Phou Khoun, fearing land mines. On 22 July, GM 11 from Luang Prabang departed its intermediate objective at Phou Chia accompanied by an American combat controller and a U.S. Army adviser. The Neutralists from the southern column also had forward air control help. Relaying instructions through an airborne radio link and using large bamboo arrows as target designators, they had the RLAF's Lao and Thai pilots clearing the road ahead of them with bombs. Having reached Muong Kassy south of the 7/13 junction on 25 July, they waited five days for GM 17 to arrive.

By 28 July, GM 16 from Muang Soui encamped on the mountain just east of the Route 7/13 intersection. GM 11 was only a hill away to the north. There was a pause to coordinate action between the two columns. The following day, three ADC companies of irregulars led by CIA case officer Tony Poe were heli-lifted into Sala Phou Khoun by Air America. On impulse, Poe ignored CIA restrictions on engaging in combat, and led his troops in the unauthorized assault. At 2100 hours, the three companies of guerrillas occupied the empty intersection. GM 11 and GM 16 did not move in until the following day.

== Aftermath ==
Phou Kout, overlooking Muang Soui, still remained in enemy hands, blocking the RLG path to the Plain of Jars. The U.S. proposal to bomb the mountain with napalm was scotched because British ambassador Donald Hopson objected to its use, and the paratroopers were unable to capture the heights in four attempts. Running into minefields, the paratroopers suffered 106 casualties from the explosives. The communists hung onto the Plain of Jars. Captured booty from Sala Phou Khoun included six armored cars, four Soviet 85mm field guns, four 105 mm howitzers, 12 trucks, and tons of munitions. The General Staff of the Royal Lao Army was ecstatic. Some enthusiasts thought recapture of the entire Plain of Jars might still be possible. Prime Minister Souvanna Phouma, as well as Generals Kouprasith and Vang Pao all visited the site for inspection tours on 30 July 1964.

However, matters were not helped by GM 11's arrival being greeted with an accidental discharge from a guerrilla recoilless rifle that nearly hit its headquarters section. The commander of GM 16 was furious at being robbed of his victory. Morale sagged among all the Lao government regulars despite their partial success.

The fact that Poe and the Hmong irregulars had actually captured the objective was downplayed. The purpose of the operation had been as much public relations as seizure of territory; the Royal Lao Army needed success as a morale booster. At any rate, timing favored obscurity, as the Tonkin Gulf Incident of 2 August pulled America into the Vietnam War even as Operation Triangle was ending. As the Tonkin Gulf Incident overshadowed Operation Triangle and the focus of American attention switched to Vietnam, the CIA was tasked with generating support within Laos for the Vietnam theater.
