= Table of organization and equipment for an ADC company =

== The American Auto Defense de Choc ==
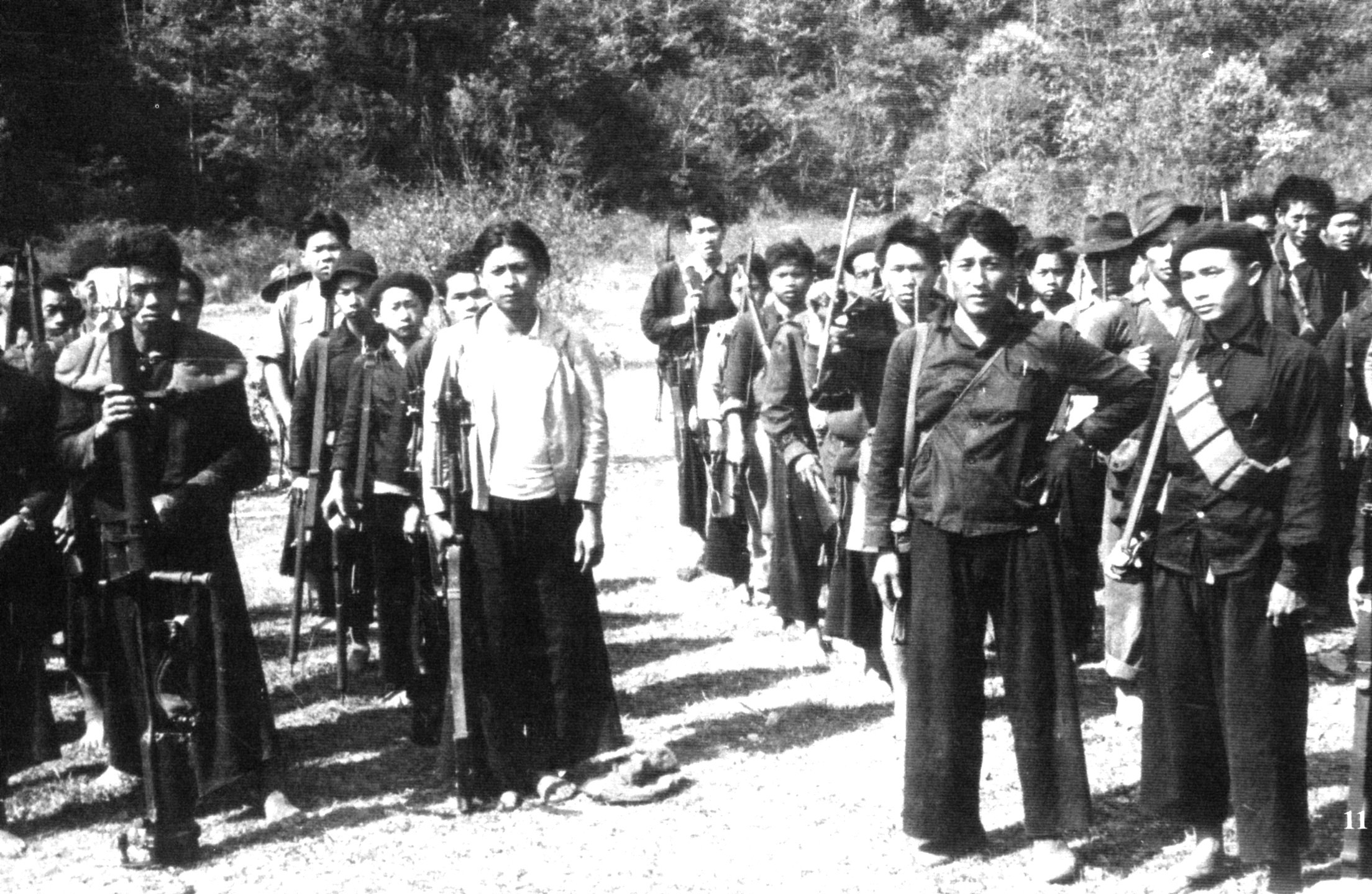
A Auto Defense de Choc (ADC) Hmong guerrilla company assembles at Phou Vieng, Spring 1961.

The Auto Defense de Choc (Self-Defense village militia) company basic training program was a short intensive course in military tactics; it was developed at the start of the Laotian Civil War to begin a guerrilla movement in Laos. The ADC training that took place in the face of the North Vietnamese and Pathet Lao communist troops was so successful it was copied elsewhere, including Operation Pincushion in Laos, and among the Degar of South Vietnam. The ADC program consisted of prepacked military equipment suitable for training 100 recruits at a time.

== Background ==
As the French lost the First Indochina War, the United States edged its way into taking over support of the Kingdom of Laos. This action was complicated by the U.S. being bound by the Geneva Agreements guaranteeing Laotian neutrality. In January 1961, the Central Intelligence Agency began secret paramilitary operations within Laos. Its aim was to thwart a Vietnamese communist invasion of the kingdom. The resulting Laotian Civil War would be subsumed by the burgeoning Vietnam War.

== Origin of the ADC ==
Faced with the conundrum of founding a secret army in the face of an active enemy during wartime, CIA case officer James William Lair founded Operation Momentum. This was a three-day course in basic military training, using small arms and equipment parachuted in to the Hmong recruits and their Thai trainers. The resulting self-defense units were called Auto Defense Choc (Self Defense Shock). The results sparked copies of the program such as Operation Pincushion. The ADC companies were constituted as follows:

=== Table of Organization for an ADC company ===
- Headquarters section
  - Two officers
  - 14 enlisted ranks
- Three platoons of irregulars
  - One officer
  - 27 enlisted ranks

Total personnel authorized: Five officers, 95 enlisted.

=== Table of Equipment for an ADC company ===
- One pallet containing 100 uniforms
- One pallet containing pistol belts, canteens, and cleaning kits for small arms
- Nine pallets of munitions, including:
  - One 57mm recoilless rifle
  - One 60mm mortar
  - Three Browning Automatic Rifles
  - Grenades and ammunition

The above eleven pallets were rigged for paradroppage by the Police Aerial Reinforcement Unit of the Thai Border Patrol Police, and weighed just shy of 2.7 metric tons.

=== Resupply package ===
There was also a standardised resupply package.

- Four pallets, including:
  - Ammunition for M1 Garand
  - Ammunition for M1 Carbine
  - Grenades
  - Both high explosive and white phosphorus ammunition for 60 mm mortar
  - Both white phosphorus and anti-tank ammunition for 57 mm recoilless rifle

The resultant load weighed just over one metric ton.

== ADC operations ==
Although the ADC served the purpose of self-defense of Hmong villages, it was also the basis for further military training. As Operation Momentum developed, some ADC graduates were picked for further schooling as training cadre called Special Operating Teams. Other graduates progressed to becoming members of Special Guerrilla Units tasked with offensive military operations. The ADC programs would continue until the end of the Second Indochina War.
