= Bill Young (CIA officer) =

- Born: William Young; October 28, 1934; Kengtung, British-ruled Burma
- Died: April 1, 2011 (aged 76); Thailand
- Cause of death: Suicide by gunshot
- Military career
- Allegiance: United States
- Branch: United States Army; Central Intelligence Agency
- Service years: 1958–1967 (CIA)
- Nickname: Bill
- Conflicts: Laotian Civil War

William Young (28 October 1934 – 1 April 2011) was a Central Intelligence Agency paramilitary officer born in Berkeley, California and raised in Burma and Thailand. Although he was Caucasian, he was reared in the local hill tribe culture. Because his father and brother already worked for the CIA and knew Bill Lair, the Agency knew of his extensive cultural contacts with the Lahu people and other Southeast Asian hill tribes. With command of several Asian languages, he was made a natural recruiter of local guerrillas for the CIA's covert operations in the secret war in the Kingdom of Laos. He was then considered for the position of case officer to the Hmong Vang Pao. He was passed over in favor of sending him on an extended reconnaissance of the Kingdom of Laos. His tour ranged westward from his start at Long Tieng, which he reported as well sited for operations in the Plain of Jars, back to familiar territory in the Golden Triangle.

While assigned to paramilitary duty in Nam Yu, Laos, in the Golden Triangle from 1962 to 1967, Young trained a militia army of several thousand hill tribesmen and spied on the People's Republic of China. In time, he clashed with his superiors over the increasing aerial bombing of Laos, and was fired. He spent almost all the rest of his life as a businessman in Chiang Mai, Thailand. Upon occasion, he would work security for an oil company in Sudan, or consult for the U.S. Drug Enforcement Administration. Plagued by ill-health in his later years, he died by suicide on 1 April 2011.

== Family background ==
Young was born on 28 October 1934 in Kengtung in British-ruled Burma, into the third generation of a Baptist missionary family. The mission was first established among Lahu in the Burmese mountains by Young's grandfather, William Marcus Young. The eldest Young converted many hill tribesmen to Christianity, his proselytizing aided by the Lahu cultural belief in the coming of a white god. Bill Young's father Harold inherited the mission and moved it to Chiang Mai in northern Thailand. Bill Young grew up participating in the Lahu tribe's traditions of hunting, hiking, and jungle survival. Not only did his youthful adventures equip him for life as a jungle dweller, it raised him in multiple languages. His knowledge of Thai, Lahu, Shan and Lao would be a key asset to the Central Intelligence Agency in the future. So was his family's significance to the Christianized hill tribes, which Young would play upon to support his anti-Communist activities for the Central Intelligence Agency.

Both Young's elder brother Gordon and his father Harold aided the CIA with an intelligence gathering net of Lahu agents extending from northern Thailand into southern China. While Harold recruited agents and gathered the resultant intelligence, Gordon trained the agents in broadcast procedures and radio repair. Bill Young met Bill Lair through this family connection. Lair claimed he first met Young when the latter was 18 years old—"a big, strong, good looking, very innocent guy." That establishes their first meeting as being in late 1952 or early 1953.

== Central Intelligence Agency service ==
Son Bill followed in his father's footsteps by joining the CIA after serving in the U.S. Army in Germany. He was then hired by the CIA in 1958 as an interpreter and translator, as he knew five tribal languages. Bill Young's knowledge of the Golden Triangle region, command of indigenous languages, and recent military experience made him an ideal candidate for service in the CIA's paramilitary wing—then known as the Special Operations Division. The Agency's rueful joke concerning Bill Young stated that he had an American exterior to disguise his Lahu interior. The very cultural background that made Young so valuable to the CIA would also become the font of their problems with him. He was stubbornly independent, and tended to take orders only from Bill Lair. In Lahu fashion, he was not strict in observing a punctual duty schedule. He did not always observe the niceties of calendar or watch, which led to complaints from other CIA case officers. Young was known to have a legion of female admirers, and a penchant for the occasional French leave, thus irritating his superiors. Additionally, his personality clashed with that of coworker Pat Landry as they worked together at the Royal Thai Air Force Base at Udorn. All of these scotched his chance for which he seemed ideally suited, that of CIA adviser to the Hmong General Vang Pao.

Lair's solution to the personnel problem was to ship Young out from headquarters into the field. He used him to assist in founding the Operation Momentum guerrilla training program, before sending him out to spot locations for new guerrilla bases in Laos. Young flew toward the Plain of Jars and found a feasible location at Long Tieng. It would be developed by the CIA paramilitary into Lima Site 20 Alternate, the center of the purportedly Secret War.

Lair thought Young uniquely qualified to operate solo in a culture that is so different from American ways. Lair had Young work his way westward toward the mountains where he was reared. Young's directions were to contact village headmen for recruitment and to find airstrip locations for Lima Sites. He was also exploring a possible line of retreat for Vang Pao's army through Sainyabuli Province southward into Thailand. Young reached Sainyabuli Province in January 1962. Keeping a low profile there throughout the spring, he was able to recruit only 30 new guerrillas.

Later in 1962, Young moved northward into far northwestern Laos, as close to the familiar Burmese hills and Shan as possible. Given the shortage of Royal Lao regulars in the vicinity, the CIA decided to raise a guerrilla force. However, given Young's record of underachievement, Lair thought the most Young might accomplish would be to organize a local force of Yao irregulars or to reactivate his father's old agent network into China. With a pool of about 100,000 Yao to draw from, plus some scattered smaller ethnic minorities, Young managed to raise a part-time militia of several thousand guerrillas.

Young established his base at Nam Yu, Laos, in the Golden Triangle just south of the Chinese border; as part of his base, he opened Lima Site 118A so he could have aerial resupply. Some 20 additional dirt airstrips for STOL aircraft were carved out throughout the area by late 1963. He also established a second site nearby for refugee relief operations; the setup was analogous to that at Long Tieng and Sam Thong. Nam Yu, being near the borders of both Burma and China, offered easy access to both nations. Initially, Young enrolled Burmese Shan for leadership and communications roles because they spoke English. Their major drawback was their scarce numbers in the Laotian populace. However, Young's family background facilitated recruitment from the Shan National Army in far northern Burma. He also had contacts within the National Chinese remnants there; indeed, Battalion Especiale 101 (Special Battalion 101) of the Laotian army was raised from this group. However, by late 1962, this source of manpower would come to be shunned by the CIA as the Kuomintang holdovers began to edge into opium trading. Their past poor performance in combat also told against their retention.

The espionage teams trained by Young were segregated by ethnic background. In 1964, those codenamed Scope began carrying out reconnaissance as their military intelligence mission. Conversely, Tartar teams were tasked with road watch and ground photography duties. As part of his operations, Young also seeded two childhood friends as spies into an opium smuggling caravan entering China. They photographed Chinese engineers building a highway through the trackless Yunnan wilderness into Laos, and headed for Thailand.

Young also had the telephone lines on the Chinese side of the border tapped although no valuable information was gained. However, with no outside enemy to fight, his tribal militia tended to squabble with one another over ethnic differences. Nevertheless, there would be more than 50 cross-border missions between 1962 and 1971. Beginning in 1963, Young would also use locally recruited Kuomintang troops to raid villages occupied by the opposing Pathet Lao.

After five years labor, Young had a guerrilla training program in full swing and teams of spies infiltrating China's Yunnan Province, as well as three radio listening posts just within the Burmese border, aimed at China. With all of that established, Young was replaced by Louis Ojibwe, who was soon killed in action, then subsequently by Tony Poe in Summer 1965. Young moved south to work at Ban Houayxay on the Mekong River to report on enemy boat traffic. He was tardy in submitting reports, however; Poe fired him, supposedly for this lack of diligence. However, Young had also argued bitterly with his superiors about the increase in air strikes throughout Laos that would lead to its becoming the most heavily bombed nation in history. Additionally, an incident in early 1964, when he supplied an unauthorized shipment of M1 Garands to Mien guerrillas, aroused extreme antipathy from the local Thai liaison officer, Captain Siri Pandy. Pandy returned to Bangkok. Young was recalled to CIA Headquarters for this insubordinate act in October 1964.

Young was returned to Nam Yu in August 1965, to run the cross-border infiltrations of local intelligence teams. By the time Young resigned from the CIA in 1967, he had not only organized the trans-border spying operations that wiretapped the Chinese telephone network, he had founded a training program that graduated 35 new agents every other month, and set up three communication stations in Burma near the Chinese border to monitor Chinese radio traffic. Given that legal commerce in opium permeated the population of northwestern Laos, it was inevitable that Young both dealt with opium smugglers and was accused of engaging in opium smuggling. Young maintained he followed the CIA policy of indifference to the trade.

== Later life ==
After Young departed CIA employ, he was employed by former Burmese Prime Minister U Nu. Beginning in April 1969, he roamed from one wealthy donor to another, swapping trade concessions in Burma for funds to establish the United National Liberated Front (ULNF). Returning from the United States, Young joined in recruiting ULNF troops. However, the Lahu recruits and the Chinese trainers engaged in ethnic quarrels. The UNLF failed because of this disunity.

Young moved back to Chiang Mai. He began trading in gems, and owned an orchard and a guest house. He ran a hospitable home, throwing parties for stewardesses and nurses. He married one of the former, and made an abortive move to the United States. He divorced, and returned to Chiang Mai. Upon occasion, he would trade upon his CIA background, to work as an oil firm's security consultant in Sudan or for the U.S. Drug Enforcement Administration.

Serious health problems, including emphysema, beset him during his final years and he died by his own hand on 1 April 2011. When Thai police discovered his body, he had a pistol in his right hand and a crucifix in his left. He had been paid $100,000 by a major Hollywood studio for his life story of adventure as a tribal warlord, but the film was never made.
