= Hilton, Oklahoma =

- Unincorporated community
- Little Cussetah Church, just west of Hilton on East Hilton Road, September 2026

- Location within Oklahoma
- Coordinates: 36°00′35″N 96°02′51″W
- Country: United States
- State: Oklahoma
- County: Creek
- Elevation: 810 ft (250 m)
- Time zone: UTC-6 (Central (CST))
  - Summer (DST): UTC-5 (CDT)
- Area codes: 539 & 918
- GNIS feature ID: 1763595

Hilton is an unincorporated community in Creek County, Oklahoma, United States. It is east of Sapulpa and west of Jenks, located just south of Oklahoma State Highway 364 at the intersection of Hilton Road and S 49th W Ave.

== Notable person ==
- James William Lair, Central Intelligence Agency operative, was born in Hilton.
