= Anne Garrels =

American journalist (1951–2022)

- Born: July 2, 1951; Springfield, Massachusetts, U.S.
- Died: September 7, 2022 (aged 71); Norfolk, Connecticut, U.S.
- Education: Radcliffe College
- Occupation: Journalist
- Years active: 1975–2016
- Employers: ABC News (1975–1985); NBC News (1985–1988); NPR (1988–2010)
- Spouse: J. Vinton Lawrence (m. 1986; died 2016)

Anne Longworth Garrels (July 2, 1951 – September 7, 2022) was an American broadcast journalist who worked as a foreign correspondent for National Public Radio, as well as for ABC and NBC, and other media.

In the mid-1970s, when she worked for ABC (including as producer), Garrels was one of the few women national broadcast journalists in the United States—eventually serving as ABC's Moscow Bureau Chief in the Soviet Union, until expelled for her detailed, unflattering reporting on the country and its issues. She became a war correspondent for ABC, covering Central American conflicts. She later became NBC's reporter at the U.S. State Department.

In 1988, Garrels began her 22-year career as a foreign correspondent for National Public Radio (NPR), closely covering conflicts and other major events throughout the world, earning numerous media awards, most famously for covering the 2003 Iraq War and its aftermath—at one point the only American broadcast journalist in Iraq's war-torn capital.

Garrels was active in journalism-related organizations, and global affairs causes, and wrote two noted books—one about the Soviet Union, and one about the Iraq war and its aftermath, both recounting her own experiences, as well as providing detailed historical coverage of those places in that time.

== Background and education ==
Anne Longworth Garrels was born in Springfield, Massachusetts, on July 2, 1951, the daughter of Valerie (Smith) and John C. Garrels Jr. She spent part of her childhood in London, where her father worked as an executive for Monsanto. She was educated at St Catherine's School, Bramley.

Garrels returned to the United States and enrolled at Middlebury College, but later transferred to Harvard University's Radcliffe College, where she studied Russian and graduated in 1972.

== Career ==
=== Early career ===
In 1975, Garrels worked for the ABC television network in several positions for ten years, including as producer—one of the few women broadcast journalists at the time.

She served ABC in the Soviet Union as Moscow bureau chief and correspondent until she was expelled in 1982. Able to speak Russian, and "in love" with the country, she was noted for more in-depth reporting from that country than most other U.S. journalists. She interviewed prominent Soviet dissidents Andrei Sakharov, Roy Medvedev, and Sergei Kovalyov. Her reporting exposed numerous hardships of Soviet citizens, displeasing the Soviet government, resulting in her 1982 expulsion. She did not return until 1988, just before the collapse of the Soviet Union.

As ABC's Central American bureau chief from 1984 to 1985, she covered the wars in Nicaragua and El Salvador.

From 1985 to 1988, Garrels reported for NBC News as its correspondent at the U.S. State Department.

In mid-1988, Garrels hosted Science Journal, a 25-part weekly news series on science, medicine and technology, at WETA-TV, and aired by PBS. It was the first such television series of its kind, with panel discussions among experts and journalists. However, Garrels' workload at National Public Radio (particularly as State Department correspondent), and a family illness, forced her to withdraw from the program that November.

=== NPR career ===
Garrels joined NPR in 1988 and reported on conflicts in Chechnya, Bosnia, Kosovo, Afghanistan, Pakistan, Israel, the West Bank, and Iraq. She also reported from China (and covered the Tiananmen Square Protests) and Saudi Arabia. She returned to Russia in 1988, as the Soviet Union began to collapse, and from 1993 until 1997 was NPR's Moscow bureau chief.

Garrels was the Edward R. Murrow Fellow at the Council on Foreign Relations in 1996, and was a member of the board of the Committee to Protect Journalists from 1999 until her death in 2022. She also served on the board of Oxfam America.

Following the 9/11 attacks on the U.S., in September 2001, and during the subsequent U.S. invasion of Afghanistan, Garrels spent several months in northern Afghanistan with the Northern Alliance, and in or around Kabul, also traveling to Pakistan and Israel in early 2002.

Shortly before the U.S. and its coalition invaded Iraq in 2003, Garrels traveled there. and was one of the sixteen Western journalists who remained in Baghdad, and reported live during the 2003 Iraq War—and for a while was the only American broadcast reporter still broadcasting from the middle of Baghdad. Garrels survived the April 8, 2003, U.S. tank attack on the Palestine Hotel, where she and hundreds of other journalists were living.

Following the April 8, 2003, U.S. bombing of the Al Jazeera office in Baghdad, which killed journalist Tareq Ayyoub ("Tariq/Tareq Ayoub"), Garrels reportedly said that Ayyoub should have known better than to be in his office during the invasion—a comment that raised angry responses from some in the international journalism community, who accused her of "blaming the victim."

Shortly after her return from Iraq, she published Naked in Baghdad (2003, Farrar, Straus, and Giroux), a memoir of her time covering the events surrounding the invasion. She subsequently returned to Iraq several times for NPR. She was an embedded reporter with the U.S. Marines during the November 2004 attack on Fallujah. Garrels also covered the January 2005 Iraqi national elections for an interim government, as well as constitutional referendum and the December 2005 elections for the first full term Iraqi government. As sectarian violence swept much of central Iraq Garrels continued to report from Baghdad, Najaf and Basra.

In 2007 Garrels was criticized by FAIR for using confessions by prisoners who had been tortured, during a story about an Iraqi Shiite militia (broadcast on NPR's Morning Edition). Garrels later defended her story on NPR's Letters program, saying: "Of course, I had doubts. But the details that were given seemed to me to gel with other things that I had heard from people who had not been tortured. But I was as uncomfortable as the listeners were with the conditions."

Garrels retired from NPR in 2010.

=== Late career ===
Garrels continued her work with the Committee to Protect Journalists until the end of her life, serving on its board of directors.

In 2016, she published her second book, Putin Country: A Journey into the Real Russia, with Farrar, Straus, and Giroux.

Toward the end of her life, Garrels served as a judge for the Overseas Press Club Awards, including the Lowell Thomas Award which she judged in 2021.

After the 2022 Russian invasion of Ukraine, Garrels, then 70 years old and undergoing treatment for cancer, approached NPR about coming out of retirement to cover the conflict. While her offer was declined, she started a non-profit organization, Assist-Ukraine, to raise money to support Ukraine and victims of the war, particularly medical supplies, reportedly raising US$1 million for the cause.

== Personal life ==
In 1986, Garrels married J. Vinton Lawrence, one of two CIA paramilitary officers from the Special Activities Division stationed in Laos in the early 1960s, who worked with Hmong tribesmen and the CIA-owned airline Air America. They were married until Lawrence's death from leukemia in 2016.

Garrels lived in Norfolk, Connecticut, where she died from lung cancer on September 7, 2022, aged 71.

== Awards and recognition ==
- 1992 Alfred I. duPont–Columbia University Award (as part of NPR team receiving the award), for coverage of the Gulf War
- 1994 Citation for Excellence, Madeline Dane Ross Award ("for best correspondent[s] in any medium showing a concern for the human condition"), Overseas Press Club, for her NPR work: Russia: The Human Cost of Reform.
- 1996–97, Edward R. Murrow Fellow at the Council on Foreign Relations
- 1997 Silver Baton, Alfred I. duPont–Columbia University Award, (and NPR) for coverage of the former Soviet Union.
- 1998 Whitman Bassow Award, Overseas Press Club, with Loren Jenkins, for an NPR series on water issues around the globe.
- 2002 Alumnae Recognition Award, Radcliffe Association, Harvard University
- 2003 George Polk Award for Radio Reporting for her coverage of the war in Iraq, "enduring bombings, blackouts, thirst and intimidation to report from the besieged Iraqi capital of Baghdad."
- 2003 Courage in Journalism Award from the International Women's Media Foundation (IWMF).
- 2003 Fellowship, The Montgomery Fellows Program, Dartmouth College
- 2004 Alfred I. duPont–Columbia University Award, (to NPR, specifically citing Garrels and 6 other NPR journalists), for coverage of the war in Iraq.
- 2004 Peabody Award, to NPR – specifically citing Garrels (first) and 9 other NPR journalists, for coverage of the war in Iraq.
- 2004 Edward R. Murrow Award from the Corporation for Public Broadcasting (CPB).
- 2004 Fellow, Society of Professional Journalists
- 2004 Missouri Honor Medal for Distinguished Service in Journalism, Missouri School of Journalism, University of Missouri, (awarded in 2004, presented in 2009)
- 2006 Weintal Prize for Diplomatic Reporting, Institute for the Study of Diplomacy, Walsh School of Foreign Service, Georgetown University
- 2010 Daniel Pearl Award for Courage and Integrity in Journalism, Los Angeles Press Club
- 2012 Inductee: "Writers & Journalists" category, Connecticut Women's Hall of Fame
- Inter-Action's Award for Excellence in International Reporting

== Publications and programs ==
=== Books ===
- Naked in Baghdad: The Iraq War as Seen by NPR's Correspondent, 2002, Farrar, Straus and Giroux (account of her 5 years as a radio correspondent in Iraq) (Excerpts at: Neiman Reports, Harvard University)
- Putin Country: A Journey into the Real Russia, 2016, Farrar, Straus and Giroux (study of Russian public, during the era of Vladimir Putin, particularly in Chelyabinsk, Russia)

=== Films ===
- Journalist: Killed in the Line of Duty, – Co-narrator, with Christiane Amanpour, Tom Brokaw, Walter Cronkite, Peter Jennings and Dan Rather (director: Steven Rosenbaum; host: Anderson Cooper)

=== Television programs ===
- Science Journal, 25-part weekly news series on science, medicine and technology, 1988, WETA-TV / PBS
