= Project Waterpump =

Project Waterpump (alternately, Operation Waterpump, or simply Waterpump) was a secretive support operation by the U.S. Air Force to train and nurture into existence the Royal Lao Air Force (RLAF). The United States had decided to covertly support the Kingdom of Laos in the Laotian Civil War as the Lao fended off a North Vietnamese invasion. The nascent RLAF was seen as a force multiplier but needed pilots and technicians. The 40-man Detachment 6, 1st Air Commando Wing, code named Waterpump, was forwarded to Udorn Royal Thai Air Force Base for this training duty in March 1964. They would remain on duty through the truce of 21 February 1973. Their first hasty assignment was transition training to the T-28 Trojan for American civilian pilots; the resulting A Team would exist through 1967. The Air Commandos also conducted final training for Royal Thai Air Force (RTAF) mercenary pilots; the resultant B Team would serve until 1970. Besides putting a polish on graduate pilots, the Waterpump detachment trained Lao pilots from scratch. The RLAF's high pilot casualty rate made bringing the RLAF rosters up to strength a long grind.

Waterpump grew beyond its original training mission. From 19–29 July 1964, some Air Commandos were smuggled into Laos as an improvised Tactical Air Control Party for Operation Triangle. The success of the endeavor led to a forward air control system being set up for the war's duration. Some Waterpump personnel were later infiltrated into Laos to help staff regional Air Operation Centers. With Waterpump help, by war's end the RLAF had grown from 20 to 75 T-28 strike aircraft; it also operated ten AC-47 gunships and 71 support aircraft.

== Background ==
As the United States government began supporting the French effort in the First Indochina War, it needed a secretive organization to support the Royal Lao Government (RLG) and its armed forces in its fight against North Vietnamese invaders. The purportedly civilian Programs Evaluation Office (PEO) sprang into being in December 1955 to offset a communist insurgency. It would be superseded by the Requirements Office (RO) during President John F. Kennedy's term of office. Thus, when the decision was made to train up and improve the Royal Lao Air Force (RLAF) to help prosecute the Laotian Civil War, the precedent had been set for covert support of the mission.

== Activities ==
On 6 December 1963, Commander in Chief Pacific recommended that counterinsurgency experts from the Special Air Warfare Center at Eglin Air Force Base be detailed to aid the Royal Lao Air Force. On 5 March 1964, U.S. Secretary of Defense Robert S. McNamara approved deployment of Detachment 6, 1st Air Commando Wing on six month temporary duty to Udorn Royal Thai Air Force Base. It was an all-volunteer unit; most of the men already had similar experience serving in Vietnam with Operation Farmgate. Codenamed variously Project or Operation Waterpump, or simply Waterpump, Detachment 6 was attached to 2nd Air Division in Saigon. It carried out training specified by Deputy Chief, Joint United States Military Advisory Group, Thailand (DEPCHIEFJUSTMAGTHAI). However, because the Ambassador controlled all U.S. military activities in Laos, reality said the Air Commandos answered to him.

Major Drexel B. "Barney" Cochran headed a 40-man detachment; it was equipped with four AT-28D Trojans for training purposes. It was decided that the T-28s would be unmarked unless it was necessary to use either Lao or Thai insignia. The detachment was assigned primarily to train pilots for the Royal Lao Air Force. Although the RLAF had 20 T-28s, 13 Douglas C-47s, and eight light aircraft, it had only 23 pilots of disparate but low skill levels. In a desperate quest to fill seats in T-28 cockpits, the Air Commandos immediately began to train civilian pilots from Air America and Thai mercenaries. The civilian pilots would become known as the A Team of the RLAF. The Thai pilots were dubbed the B Team, and would fly under call sign Firefly; they signed on to fly 100 combat missions in six months.

Ambassador Leonard Unger approved his Programs Evaluation Office turning over bombs to the RLAF on 17 May. He also requested additional T-28s for the RLAF. Major Cochran forwarded the four Waterpump T-28s to Vientiane on the 18th; Thao Ma and his wingmen flew 12 combat sorties that afternoon. That same day, Unger urged his superiors in Washington, DC to approve use of American pilots in T-28s. Three days later, ten replacement T-28s arrived at Waterpump, forwarded from the Republic of Vietnam Air Force as excess to their needs. Approval also came through from Washington allowing use of American pilots. As some Air America pilots were ex-military fighter pilots, they were already highly experienced. On 25 May 1964, after a week's familiarization training with the T-28, five Air America pilots flew their first combat mission, but to little effect except bullet holes in two of the planes. Ambassador Unger witnessed the battle damage and decided use of American pilots had to be restricted to emergency situations.

Thereafter, use of the A Team was always highly selective because of the potential international media sensation if an American fell into communist hands. However, in the absence of any other combat search and rescue capabilities, the A Team covered pilot retrieval efforts in Laos. The Thai B Team offered certain advantages; the Thai and Lao languages being mutually understandable helped considerably. Then too, the Thais being paid directly by Americans made them amenable to command. In the first year of Waterpump, 23 B Team pilots served in the RLAF. Amidst all this, Water Pump also began to train Lao pilots.

Some Air Commandos now began to infiltrate Laos. In May 1964, two formed a skeletal Air Operations Center at Wattay outside Vientiane. The Air Commandos also pushed the envelope to sneakily fly some combat missions from time to time. Moreover, when U.S. Navy Lieutenant Charles F. Klusman was shot down on an armed reconnaissance mission on 6 June 1964, B and A Team pilots successively flew cover for the combat search and rescue effort. Also in June, a Waterpump officer and two enlisted specialists were covertly sent to Luang Prabang to support B Team efforts there.

The following month, Cochran, his unit's intelligence officer, and several other Air Commandos were covertly smuggled into Laos to participate in Operation Triangle. They served as an impromptu Tactical Air Control Party, coordinating complex air operations among Triangle's three columns and serving as forward air controllers. The operation was successful. Despite the distraction of Operation Triangle, Waterpump managed to bring the RLAF T-28 force to 15 fully trained pilots, with five more in process.

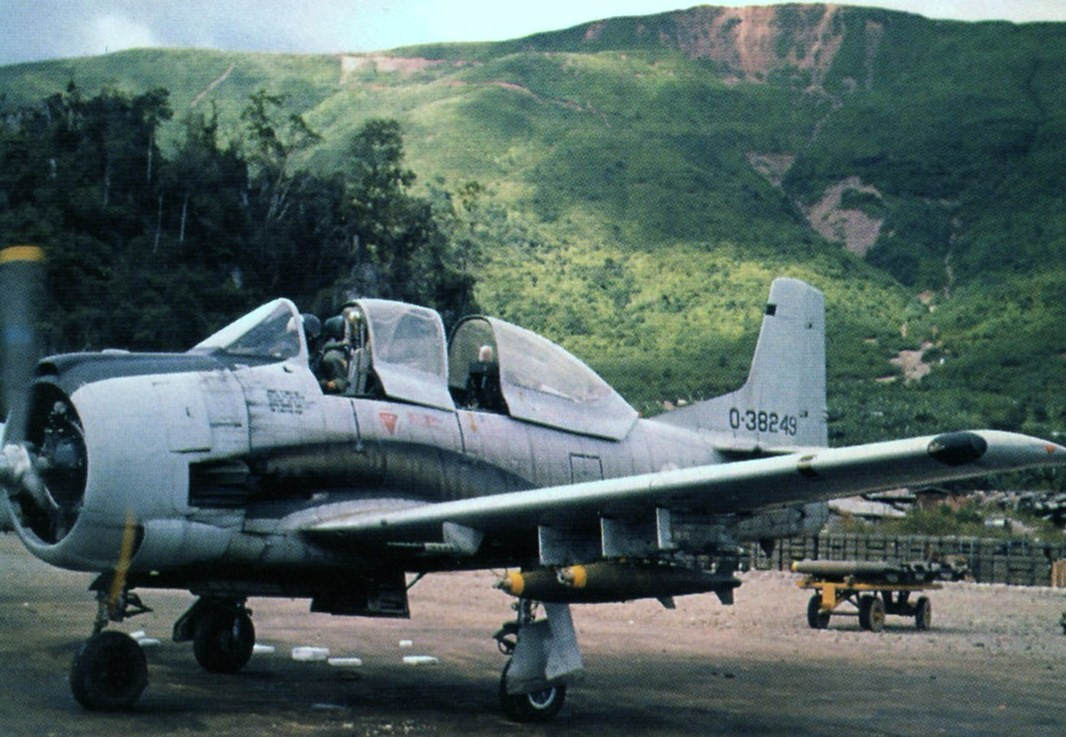
The Project Waterpump end result. A Royal Lao Air Force fighter pilot prepares to fly a T-28D strike from Long Tieng.

As the Waterpump mission continued, it was attached to the 606th Air Commando Squadron in 1966. General Vang Pao agitated for his own Hmong pilots to support his Clandestine Army. He pointed out that the other four military regions of Laos had an RLAF squadron; that they did not share their air assets with him, and that he had need of the same. CIA case agent James William Lair began a pilot training program for him in Thailand, using scrounged light aircraft and instructor pilots scrounged from the Thai Police Aerial Reinforcement Unit, Continental Air Services, Inc, and the Royal Thai Air Force. By Summer 1967, the improvised program had graduated dozens of neophyte pilots in its three classes. Two of them were the first of 19 Hmong pilots accepted for Waterpump training. The Hmong were unlikely pilot candidates. They were unfamiliar with modern machinery, possessed little English, and were of small stature. However, wood blocks wired to the rudder pedals brought that control within reach of the short-legged cadets. Seat cushions in the T-28s boosted the Hmong high enough they could see out of the cockpit to fly.

Building the RLAF's pilot strength in the face of combat losses was a long process. The Hmong turned out to be highly courageous fighters who flew until they were killed in action; only three of them would survive the war. One of the fallen Hmong, Vang Pao's brother-in-law Lee Lue, became the most famed pilot of the RLAF. The ongoing deaths in action made it difficult to supply sufficient numbers of Lao pilots to the RLAF. The A Team would not be phased out until 1967; by that time the B Team was considered trustworthy enough to replace them. The 606th also expanded and became the 56th Air Commando Wing in 1967.

Waterpump gained a new responsibility in March 1968. A forward air control operation named Raven FACs was formed in Laos; incoming volunteers were briefed at Waterpump before entering Laos. Still another task was laid upon them on 17 July 1968. Ambassador William H. Sullivan decided to expand the Air Commando Air Operation Centers from four specialists to about 14. The expanded AOC would have an instructor pilot in command, additional Raven FACs as needed, a senior enlisted flight line chief, a medic, a radio operator, an aircraft ordnance specialist, an avionics specialist, a ground support equipment specialist, and two engine mechanics. The latter were assigned to six month TDYs from Waterpump. The AOC expansion was codified as Palace Dog; many experienced Waterpump veterans would return for repeat tours under this program.

On 18 March 1969, Waterpump began a new mission supervising a Mobile Training Team instructing air crew members for AC-47 gunships. In June 1969, a second class of Hmong pilots finished training and joined Vang Pao and the single surviving pilot from the first class. On 11 July 1969 that pilot, Lee Lue, was killed in action. Nor was his death in action unusual; after five years, Waterpump was barely able to replace RLAF pilots as they were killed.

In 1970, the B Team would finally depart as the RLAF reached its full strength. The 11th group of Thai pilots graduated from Waterpump on 17 April, but were returned to the Royal Thai Air Force, thus leaving the tenth group to end the Firefly program.

In November 1971, to counteract a cutback in Raven FACs in Laos from 25 to eight by November 1972, Waterpump began training Lao forward air controllers. With most candidates having already flown over 3,000 combat missions, flying or combat experience was not an issue. The first class of Nok Ka Tien FACS graduated in January 1972 and began directing RLAF air strikes. By September 1972, four Lao FACs had progressed to directing air strikes for the USAF.

== End ==
On 21 February 1973, the ceasefire mandated by the Vientiane Treaty came into effect. U.S. bombing halted on the 22nd. By this time, Waterpump had grown to a strength of 316 assigned personnel. All the disparate U.S. covert organizations in Laos faced downsizing as they were incorporated into a Defense Attaché's office. In Waterpump's case, Americans were withdrawn from the AOCs in the Military Regions as part of the downsizing. T-28 missions almost ceased, then resumed limpingly. On 5 April 1974, the new Provisional Government of National Union (PGNU) took charge of Laos. By that time, Waterpump had been subsumed by the Defense Attaché.

== Results ==
By the time Waterpump ceased operations, the Air Force it supported had grown to 75 T-28s, ten AC-47s, 21 C-47s, 26 H-34 helicopters, and 24 O-1 Bird Dogs. However, the RLAF suffered from its ongoing problems with training technicians, and was believed to be able to handle only 70% of maintenance on the aircraft.

The Air Commandos would also run a local civic action program. Waterpump also succeeded in its civic action program. Beginning with informal medical missions to villages near the Udorn air base, the civic action program would spread throughout Thailand, and result in a hospital for RLAF personnel in Savannakhet, Laos.

== Aftermath ==
The PGNU's attitude changed after the Fall of Saigon brought a Communist victory in the neighboring Vietnam War. The Pathet Lao abolished the monarchy and renamed the country the Lao People's Democratic Republic. The PGNU began to confiscate American property; in turn, the American contingent was reduced to a Chargé d'affaires and a staff of 20. Only a U.S. Army major remained to represent the U.S. military. In July 1976, he was expelled. On 12 March 1977, King Sisavang Vatthana was arrested.
