= Operation Pincushion =

- Part of Operation White Star and Operation Momentum, Laotian Civil War
- Type: Covert irregular military training program
- Location: Southern Laos
- Planned by: Central Intelligence Agency
- Objective: Raise an army of native irregular personnel
- Date: 13 December 1961—10 September 1962
- Executed by: Green Berets
- Outcome: Limited success, 12 companies trained

Operation Pincushion was a covert training program for hill tribe recruits to become guerrilla soldiers during the Laotian Civil War. Run by United States Special Forces and funded by the Central Intelligence Agency, it trained 12 companies of irregulars in southern Laos between December 1961 and September 1962. These guerrilla forces were near the Ho Chi Minh Trail, and intended to secure the Royal Lao Government's hold on the Bolovens Plateau.

Although copied from the CIA's Operation Momentum, the Green Berets' training program ran with limited success, due to cultural influences in the recruits' backgrounds. The adoption of the International Agreement on the Neutrality of Laos in July 1962 doomed Operation Pincushion, as it called for withdrawal of all foreign troops from the Kingdom of Laos by October of the same year. Pincushion training ended 14 September 1962 and the Green Beret trainers then withdrew from Laos.

== Background ==
The Kingdom of Laos emerged from the First Indochina War independent of the French, but in a state of chaos. Even as the French pulled out of Laos, the Americans took up their advisory role to the Royal Lao Government through such agencies as the Programs Evaluation Office. Meanwhile, Vietnamese communists and Lao communists were active in Laos, sowing discontent against the government. The government itself was in turmoil, as various Lao military officers and politicians scrambled for positions of power. The American government became convinced that Laos could not be allowed to fall under communist control, lest other countries in Southeast Asia follow suit.

In January 1961, Central Intelligence Agency case officer James William Lair founded the Operation Momentum training program in northern Laos for Hmong guerrillas. In the following three months, Momentum raised an irregular army of 5,000 Hmong. The first 2,000 Momentum recruits were funded through Department of Defense monies channeled through the Programs Evaluation Office in the U.S. Embassy, even though Momentum was a CIA project.

== Operation Pincushion ==
In southern Laos, the U.S. Special Forces decided to raise guerrilla forces on the Bolovens Plateau near the Ho Chi Minh Trail. In a reversal of Project Momentum, the CIA funded the new effort while the U.S. Army supplied the training cadre from Operation White Star. After an initial clearing sweep of the plateau by a Royal Lao Army battalion, training began near Houei Kong in April 1961. The first recruits came from the local Lao Theung population of the Hune hill tribe. Beginning 13 December 1961, a single Field Training Team instructed the new recruits. They were organized into Self-Defense militia companies (French: Auto Defense de Choc – ADC), and equipped from the same prepacked supplies as used in Project Momentum.

Training company K-1 graduated after four weeks training and began patrolling in the vicinity of the training base. A second Field Training Team then joined the effort. K-2 company, however, suffered a mass desertion of half its strength, but nevertheless, recruitment and training of new ADC companies continued.

In February 1962, an entire A Team of Green Berets augmented the training effort. They settled to establish additional bases nearby at La Ta Sin and Pak Song. They also began to establish a headquarters at Sam Thong in March. In April, another A Team arrived.

Even as the Bolovens Plateau training camps expanded, the Green Berets established a second training locale north of there in Phou Kate, near Salavan. Begun in late spring, it was manned by four A Teams training four more ADC companies, K-7, K-9, K-10, and K-11. The arrival of another A Team on 5 June 1962 resulted in Company K-12, which turned out to be problematic. Ignoring the usual practice of recruiting an entire company from the same tribe in the same locality, the trainees of K-12 came from two different ethnic backgrounds, and did not get along.

As if desertions and internal disagreements were not enough, the Green Berets noted that the Lao Theung had difficulty mastering the M1 Garand; they also could not manhandle the 57 mm recoilless rifle from place to place. Even as these shortcomings became evident, a new coalition government was forming in Vientiane; the political climate did not seem favorable for continuing the training program. On 10 July 1962, the La Ta Sin camp was closed down.

== End ==
Also in July 1962, the International Agreement on the Neutrality of Laos was signed, pledging that all foreign troops would exit Laos by October. Operation Pincushion began to wrap up. A last class at Phou Kate was scheduled to train a Special Cadre of 32 "stay-behind" agents for a future espionage network. Over a two-month period, 12 munitions caches containing hand grenades, ammunition, cleaning equipment for small arms, and rice were established. On 10 September 1962, training ended. By the 14th, the last of the Green Berets had departed, and the Phou Kate camp was abandoned to the jungle, as the United States withdrew its training personnel from Laos.

== See also ==
- Air America (airline)
- Commando Raiders
- Laotian Civil War
- Military Region 5 Commandos
- Pathet Lao
- Royal Lao Armed Forces
- Royal Lao Army Airborne
- Special Guerrilla Units (SGU)
- SPECOM
- Vietnam War
- Weapons of the Laotian Civil War
