= James William Lair =

CIA officer from Special activities division

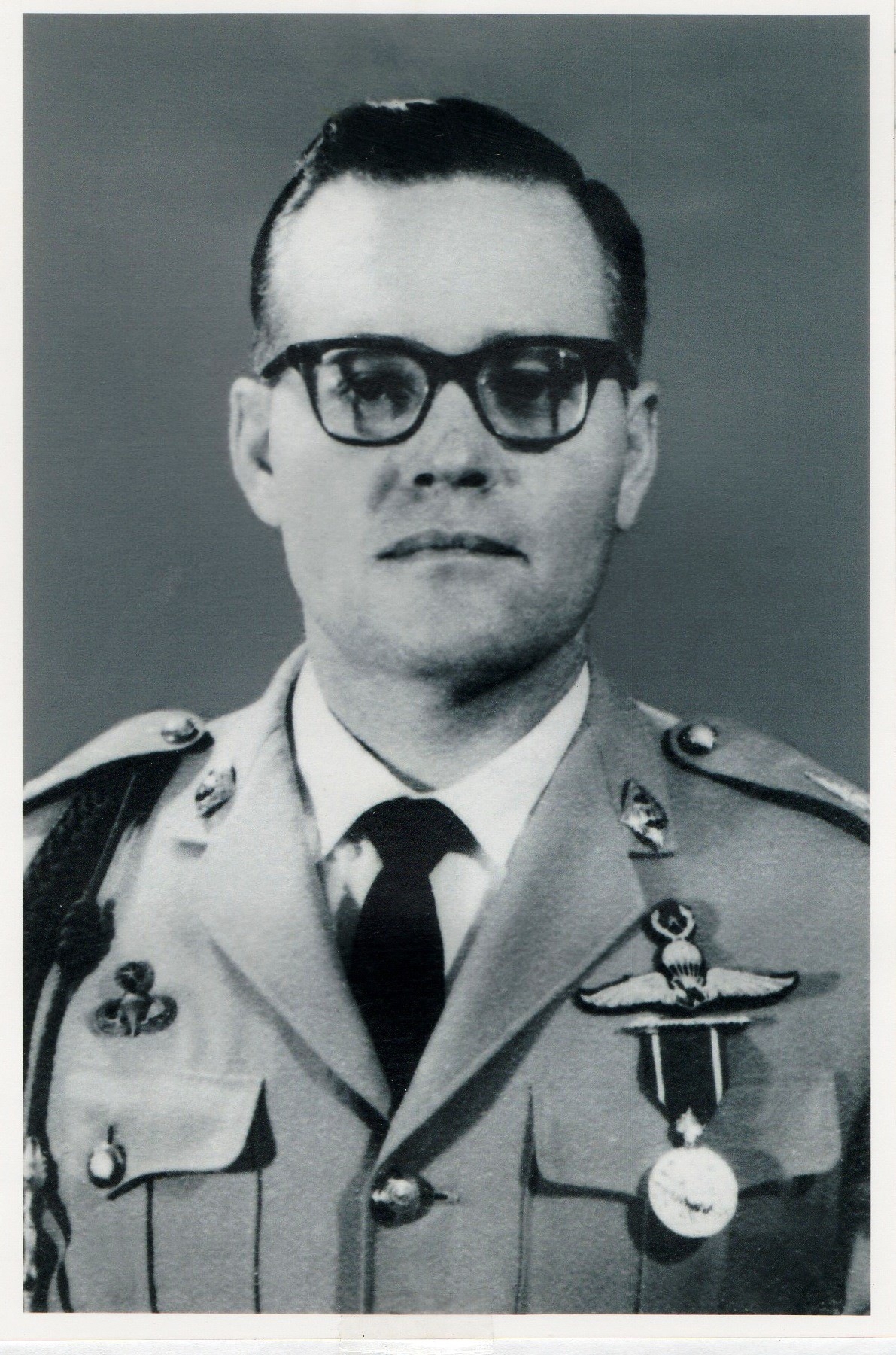
- Lair in Royal Thai Police uniform rank Police Major
- Born: 4 July 1924; Hilton, Oklahoma, United States
- Died: 28 October 2014 (aged 90)
- Military career
- Branch: Central Intelligence Agency
- Rank: GS-16
- Nickname: Bill Lair
- Other work: Royal Thai Police (Rank: Police Colonel) Special Warfare Advisor and founder of Police Aerial Reinforcement Unit

James William Lair (often referred to as Bill Lair) (4 July 1924 – October 28, 2014) was an influential Central Intelligence Agency paramilitary officer from the Special Activities Division. He was a native Texan, raised in a broken family, but a good student. He joined the CIA after serving in a combat unit in Europe during World War II, followed by a geology degree from Texas A&M. In his senior year, he was recruited by the CIA.

Assigned to the Kingdom of Thailand on 1 March 1951, Lair found himself training Border Patrol Police to Special Forces standards. Originally established with an aim of opposing the invasion of Thailand by the People's Liberation Army of China, the new unit policed the Thai border areas until hostilities broke out in the neighboring Kingdom of Laos. Acting in response to the Kong Le coup of 9 August 1960, Lair's unit secretively supplied the communications liaisons needed for the successful counter-coup of 14 December 1960. Once established within Laos, Lair promptly searched out Vang Pao. With Lair's aid, Vang Pao raised an army of 30,000 guerrilla warriors to fight in the Laotian Civil War.

The Gulf of Tonkin incident in August 1964, followed by the first American combat troops landing in Vietnam in May 1965, escalated the war. In mid-1966, the new CIA Chief of Station Ted Shackley promulgated increased operations against the Ho Chi Minh Trail and commitment of more troops to the fight for northern Laos. U.S. air power began to be used in Laos. The Royal Lao Air Force began its struggle to become an effective close air support force. A new covert unit, the Raven Forward Air Controllers, was formed to guide the air strikes. The use of airpower as mobile artillery to clear the path for guerrillas was successful in the short run; however, Lair believed it would lead to ultimate defeat for the Hmong, as they were used as light infantry in fixed positions. Increasingly estranged from Shackley, as well as from Ambassador William H. Sullivan, Bill Lair left Laos in August 1968. After attendance at the Army War College, Lair returned to a desk job in Bangkok. He would score one last military intelligence coup, when his Thai brother-in-law visited the dying Mao Zedong and brought back information about the political maneuvering of potential successors.

Just before Lair's retirement from the CIA, he was honored with a private audience with Thai King Bhumibol. Upon his return to the United States, Lair became a long haul trucker. He remained active within the Hmong-American community.

== Early life and military service ==
Bill Lair was born in Hilton, Oklahoma on 4 July 1924; he moved to Borger, Texas at the age of three. His mother divorced his father for idleness, and remarried. Her second husband died as a result of a freak oilfield explosion in 1937. However, Lair's grandfather, an old-time cowboy, was an important influence in young Bill's life. Lair lived in and around Borger and Panhandle, Texas until 1940, when he moved to Waco. He graduated from 11 years of schooling at Waco High School, at age 16. He took some post-high school courses while working for the Panhandle Herald and a grocery store.

As a fifth-generation Texan, Lair never lost his childhood accent. He was raised as an only child, although eventually he would come to have two younger sisters, and he grew up poor, quiet, and shy. His imagination sparked by his reading, he dreamt of becoming a pilot. He was a seventeen-year-old freshman at Texas A&M University when the attack on Pearl Harbor occurred. Anxious to defend his nation, he applied for naval pilot's training, but was rejected because of substandard eyesight. He then convinced his mother to cosign his enlistment papers into the U.S. Army as a private. He saw his first combat in the invasion of Normandy. His armored unit fought its way across Europe for the next year. Lair's unit ended World War II on the Elbe River, facing a Russian unit on the far bank. It was there that Lair became convinced the American army should have continued the war, and defeated the communists.

Once discharged postwar, Lair earned a geology degree from Texas A&M in expectation of working in the petroleum industry. However, the Central Intelligence Agency recruited him just before graduation.

== CIA career ==
=== Assignment to Thailand ===
After training, Lair was forwarded to the Kingdom of Thailand for his first assignment, arriving on 1 March 1951. U.S. Ambassador to Thailand Edwin F. Stanton was in the throes of a postwar rapprochement between the two nations. Agreements between the two countries led to the beginning of the American buildup in Thailand. The aim was to help the Thais block any Communist Chinese incursions through the neighboring Kingdom of Laos. Lair's part in this was an assignment to train the Royal Thai Police. He used an old Imperial Japanese training camp in Hua Hin to train a select crew of Thai police in guerrilla warfare, including parachuting. In the process, Lair discovered he had a knack for getting along with the Thais. His bashfulness, his aversion to eye contact, and quiet courteous demeanor were so congruent with ideal Thai manners that his policemen bonded with him, even though he spoke broken Thai with a Texas twang. He trained with them, and underwent survival exercises with them. He even married a Thai socialite.

Assistance to the effort was supplied by Southeast Asia Supply Company, a CIA front usually referred to as "Sea Supply". When the training program was threatened with cancellation due to an apparently dwindling invasion threat, Lair convinced his boss it was worth continuing due to its low cost. With this support, Thai Police General Phao Sriyanond leaned toward a militarized police force; in this, he was building himself a counter-force to troops loyal to the other two strongmen in the government, Field Marshal Plaek Phibunsongkhram and General Sarit Thanarat. By the end of 1953, 94 platoons of about 45 men each had been trained by Lair for Phao's command.

Earlier, in April 1953, Bill Lair was appointed a captain in the Royal Thai Police. He then selected 100 out of 2,000 previous trainees for advanced instruction in unconventional warfare in Hua Hin, next to King Bhumibol's palace. This elite group would undergo a further eight months of intensive military training before turning about and schooling a further 300 recruits. One of the first visitors to the new training center was Allen Dulles then Associate Director of the CIA. He would later prevent the camp from being closed. At that time, the unit's focus was repelling a Chinese Communist invasion. Nationalist Chinese troops still threatened to cross the Burmese and Lao borders into mainland China, and in turn the Chinese Communists seemed likely to retaliate with a preemptive incursion. The new training camp offered ample opportunity for the trainees to learn to live off the jungle.

Through his marriage, Lair acquired Thai citizenship and a commission in the Royal Thai Police, within which in 1954 he organized the elite Parachute Aerial Resupply Unit (PARU) from selected BPP recruits. Lair would use the PARU as a private army for missions inside Burma, Cambodia and Laos, where PARU members had ethnic and clan ties. And where, as an integral part of the plan, CIA and PARU members delved into gold, drugs (Opium), arms and artifact trafficking. All this was well known to the FBN (Federal Bureau of Narcotics), which by 1954 had investigated CAT (Civil Air Transport) after a large stock of opium Li Mi was arranging to sell to CAT pilot Dutch Brongersma came to the attention of US officials.

By 1955, the new unit was ready for duty as the Royal Guards. Later renamed to their more familiar cognomen, Police Aerial Resupply Unit, or PARU. They were under the hidden patronage of the king even though they had been split away from the Royal Guards. They were deployed into mountainous northern Thailand to police the hill tribes there. They surreptitiously arrested bandits and opium smugglers while establishing ties to the tribesmen whom were despised by most Thais. During this time, many Hmong mentioned a promising young Hmong warrior in Laos named Vang Pao.

By 1957, PARU consisted of two light infantry companies, as well as a pathfinder company personally commanded by Lair. Although dubbed "police", the extensively cross-trained PARU agents were trained to special forces standards. In September 1957, the PARU narrowly escaped disbandment when General Phao was forced into exile by the head of the Royal Thai Army, General Sarit. In early 1958, they were renamed with the PARU designation. They began to shift their training base from Hua Hin to Phitsanulok, which was closer to their area of operations. In 1958, they became involved in the CIA's international operations. They rigged parachutes for dropping weapons to insurgents in Indonesia. They packed pallets of weaponry for shipment from Takhli to the anti-Chinese Communist resistance in Tibet.

Early in 1960, PARU's Pathfinder Company took up three posts along the Thai-Lao border. Each of the three stations was across the Mekong River from an important Lao town. The stations were sited near Vientiane, Mukdahan, and Pakxan. On 9 August came the Kong Le coup in Vientiane. Lair and the PARU would intrude into Laos in the wake of this coup, under complex circumstances. One was that Phoumi Nosavan, who was then the Lao head of state, was a first cousin to General Sarit. The prospect of his rival Phao losing influence as casualties sapped the PARU seems to have been another reason for Sarit's acquiescence. And even as Sarit supported intervention by the PARU, Lair briefed his CIA superiors. Lair's main selling points for leading his paramilitaries into Laos was the sheer secretiveness possible because his troopers could blend seamlessly into the Lao population. It was a demographic oddity that the majority of lowland Lao actually lived south of the Lao-Thai border. Most of Lair's PARU recruits were thus of Lao origin, though Thai citizens. It was also apparent to the agency's apparatus, which had been blindsided by the coup, that it lacked reliable military intelligence sources within Laos.

=== Move into Laos ===
==== Coup and counter-coup ====
As Kong Le consolidated his position in the northern capital of Vientiane, Phoumi's opposition to the coup began to coalesce around the southern panhandle town of Savannakhet. On 19 October 1960, Bill Lair flew in the first installment of Lao kip to pay the dissident troops that had joined the Lao general. It was the first payment of the CIA's million dollar investment in a counter-coup. A few days later, five PARU teams of five espionage agents per team joined Phoumi's troops, where they blended into headquarters units. By late-November, Lair had set up his headquarters in Savannakhet, complete with a radio network. The radio net allowed him contact with his teams when they joined the move northward to Vientiane to unseat Kong Le. The five teams' distribution throughout the column of march was crucial to the success of the 400 kilometer thrust north to Vientiane.

Once Phoumi's counter-coup succeeded on 14 December 1960, Lair moved his headquarters to Vientiane. Fitzgerald promptly joined him there. Fitzgerald saw that the PARU's flawless performance in the counter-coup was based on reliable inside information, and decided that Lair and his special forces police should remain in Laos. This series of events marked the start of the Laotian Civil War. Once established there, Lair reached out to contact Vang Pao. He flew via Air America Sikorsky H-34 to the Lao village of Tha Vieng to meet the Hmong leader on 19 January 1961. Vang Pao told Lair that his people could not live under Vietnamese communist rule. "Either we fight or we leave. If you give me weapons, we fight," he told Lair. He promised he could call up 10,000 tribesmen for military training. They would follow him, he promised, and he pledged loyalty to the King of Laos. The approximately 4,300 Hmong who had accompanied him at Tha Vieng indicated that Vang Pao already had a sizable following. Although Lair did not know it at first, he was about to inherit a tradition of resistance to the Vietnamese. In the late-1800s the Hmong had founded zones of resistance under the command of local village chiefs. Now, many of their descendants would join the CIA effort. Lair saw the Hmong guerrillas as a valuable supplement to the Royal Lao Army's regular forces. His seniors agreed.

Lair foresaw a possible future need for the Hmong to retreat from battle through Sainyabuli Province southward into Thailand. Although he suggested planning such a route, the complications of arranging agreement between Thailand, Laos, and the American embassy kept it from becoming a written plan.

==== Founding L'Armée Clandestine ====
Lair took Vang Pao's offer back to Vientiane with him. By coincidence, Desmond Fitzgerald, head of the CIA's Far East Division, was on an official visit to the Station Chief for Laos, Gordon Jorgenson. Fitzgerald was a supporter of PARU. Lair convinced Fitzgerald, who was his boss's boss, that the agency should support Vang Pao's proposed guerrilla army. Funding was allocated via the Programs Evaluation Office for organizing the first 2,000 recruits into 100 man companies. The operation was classified under the code name Operation Momentum. The eventual result of Lair's initiative was a clandestine army of 30,000 hill tribesmen under Vang Pao's command.

To support the new effort, Lair brought in more PARU teams. By now, he had been promoted to lieutenant colonel in the Thai police, and was outranked only by the PARU commanding officer, Colonel Pranet Ritileuchai. In reality, Lair's control over supplies and his personal influence with Pranet and the PARU troops equalled de facto command of the unit. Lair was content with that setup, as it had led to their present success. However, additional CIA case officers such as Vint Lawrence began showing up unexpectedly and unannounced for assignment in Laos. To cope with this, Lair preferred rookie case officers whom he could inculcate with his philosophy of covert operations. In quiet discursive low-key fashion that modeled the behavior needed to impress Thai or Lao, he briefed the new case officers with information on the local situation even as he steered his listeners toward inevitable conclusions about the subject. However, not all the new case officers were rookies. Experienced hands arriving included Thomas Fosmire, Tony Poe, Pat Landry, Joe Hudachek, Jack Shirley, and William Young. On the heels of the incoming case officers were the Green Berets sent as training instructors. While Lair accepted the new helpers individually, he believed that Caucasians who did not speak a local language were both too visible and too linguistically handicapped for useful secret work. Nor did they possess any military skills in short supply, as the PARU troopers had mastered the same parachute and training courses as the Green Berets

==== Lao neutrality established ====
In summer 1962, Lair arranged USAID air drops of food, medicine, and other essentials to Hmong uprooted by the growing war. In June, when The Saturday Evening Post ran an article on this program, Lair was content to let Edgar Buell be the public face of refugee relief, as a means of hiding CIA involvement. In October 1962, in accordance with the International Agreement on the Neutrality of Laos, the Americans in country drew down to two CIA agents left in Laos after evacuation—Tony Poe and Vint Lawrence. However, 100 PARU troopers also remained, still engaged in training the Hmong. Lair and Landry withdrew to Nong Khai, Thailand, just across the Mekong River from Vientiane. In turn, the Vietnamese Communists officially withdrew 40 soldiers, with at least 5,000 others remaining in Laos.

Nong Khai being unsuitable as a headquarters, Lair moved his operation to the Udorn Royal Thai Air Force Base. The CIA building there, called AB-1, became the nerve center of secret operations in Laos. It was hidden in plain sight, under the designation, 4802nd Joint Liaison Detachment. Co-located with it was the Thai covert operations for Laos, Headquarters 333, often referred to by its Thai nickname, "Kaw Taw". With the move came a promotion. Lair was now Chief of Base, in charge of all paramilitary operations in northern Laos. He and Pat Landry, sitting at facing desks, monitored message and radio traffic from the 20 PARU teams and made their tactical and logistical decisions. At times, Lair flew into Laos for a day. Once a month, he visited his wife and child in Bangkok.

In August 1963, Lair received an order to cut Route 7 between the Plain of Jars and the Vietnamese border. After Lair's training, PARU troopers, accompanying and directing 12 platoons of Hmong from their Special Guerrilla Units, infiltrated to a portion of Route 7 that ran along steep cliffs. The saboteurs planted double cratering charges in each of 120 demolition pits they dug, and exfiltrated. When the explosions blew in the middle of the night, two sections of clifftop road migrated downwards. Once again, Lair let Pop Buell claim credit. The Route 7 communist supply line would remain cut until November.

On 10 December 1963, King Sisavang Vatthana made a state visit to Long Tieng. This trip served as a seal of approval on the Hmong as Lao, and on their martial efforts. His official visit made it clear that the Hmong were accepted in Lao society, and assuaged Lair's worries that the hill tribesmen and lowland Lao might start fighting with one another.

In 1964, Lair returned to the United States on home leave. While he was there, he attended a National Security Council meeting under the auspices of CIA head John McCone. When questions arose concerning the significance of Vang Pao's leadership of his clandestine army, Lair was asked to give his opinion as the officer attached to it. Lair stated that if Vang Pao should become a casualty, there were a number of competent subordinates who could take charge. McCone later thanked Lair for his apposite answer.

Upon returning to Laos, Lair found that enemy activities were spreading outwards from their supply center at Tchepone. As the communists occupied more ground within Laos, they began to build the road network that was becoming known as the Ho Chi Minh Trail. Lair countered with Project Hardnose, in which reconnaissance teams were dispatched from Savannakhet and Pakse to spy on the nascent logistics route between North and South Vietnam. Air attacks seemed the only method of cutting the Ho Chi Minh Trail. The Royal Lao Air Force received its first T-28 Trojans as light strike aircraft. A pilot training program for Lao pilots dubbed Operation Waterpump was established at Udorn.

==== Washington's attention shifts from Laos ====
In late-August 1964, in the wake of the Tonkin Gulf incident, the RLAF struck the Mu Gia Pass and further into northern Vietnam. In an escalation of hostilities in Laos, US Air Force jets soon began "armed reconnaissance" missions. The Tonkin Gulf incident, as well as the expanding Ho Chi Minh Trail, moved the focus of US military action away from Laos and toward Vietnam.

Lair was dismayed when he learned on 8 March 1965 that US Marine Corps infantry had landed at Danang. Lair believed that if American troops were being committed to combat, they should attack Hanoi to win the war. He also believed that US troops would move from training into combat operations, and that the increasing US role would sap the fighting spirit of the South Vietnamese forces. About the same time, Lair prompted Air America Helio Courier special-operations pilot Jim Rhyne's flight that documented the expansion and improvement of the Ho Chi Minh Trail network. It became evident the trail was a growing chain of logistical links approximately 30-40 kilometers long, with porters and chauffeurs as permanent party assigned to each link.

On 20 May 1965, BirdAir pilot Ernest C. Brace landed on a dirt landing strip in Laos that had just been overrun by the communists. He was promptly captured. Ambassador William H. Sullivan demanded information on Brace's status from the CIA station. Meanwhile, Lair commandeered a Beechcraft Baron to lead a rescue effort. Once in flight, he rounded up an improvised force of an Air America helicopter for the rescue, a Caribou for radio relay duties, and US-piloted T-28s for firepower. Ambassador Leonard Unger had previously granted Lair the authority to commandeer air assets and order air strikes in emergencies. As the Air America helo landed on the strip, for the first time ever, Lair directed strafing runs of the forests on either side of the runway—first the T-28s, then US F105 fighter-bombers. Sullivan was unaware of Unger's prior permission, and was angered by Lair's impromptu one-time use of air power. Sullivan demanded Lair be reprimanded. Station Chief Douglas Blaufarb, who was Lair's superior, backed Lair. This incident was not the only one concerning unauthorized air strikes. Ambassador Sullivan insisted on his authority to order and approve all air strikes within Laos. However, innocent civilians were being accidentally bombed. And American air power arrived according to the military's schedule, not the ambassador's.

Lair had reservations about increased use of US air power in Laos, fearing that the Hmong and other Lao forces would become too dependent upon it. However, in the wake of the Battle of Nam Bac, he could see the need for organized forward air control for close air support. His proposal to place Lao interpreters with US fighter pilots in light aircraft to direct air strikes became the Raven Forward Air Controllers. Moreover, he could see the utility of pilots and infantry sharing a common language. Vang Pao had already requested training slots for Hmong cadets at Project Waterpump at Udorn, and had been refused. Lair quietly scrounged a couple of Piper Cubs and began training Hmong pilots at Nong Khai. A PARU pilot, Somboun Sithoon, served as the first instructor. The instructional staff would come to include two pilots on loan from the Royal Thai Air Force and six more from Continental Air Services, Inc. Three classes of Hmong pilots would graduate by mid-1967, including the pilot who would become the star of the RLAF, Lee Lue.

==== "Supermarket war" ====
See also Battle of Lima Site 85, Commando Club

By mid-1966, Lair had worked successfully under three Chiefs of station, running his paramilitary operations with a relatively paltry annual budget of US$20 million. The money came directly from CIA headquarters, with offers of more funding available. Lair declined the extra money, and never requested a transfer from his assignment. For 15 years, he had encouraged and nurtured native martial talent, believing the covert operation was best done with the fewest Americans possible. As a result of his influence, there were fewer than 100 Americans working in northern Laos.

This ended with Ted Shackley. The new Chief of Station was appointed to deal with the increasing communist infiltration of supplies along the Ho Chi Minh Trail. His solution was to advocate more American involvement in Laos, whether in the Laotian panhandle against the Ho Chi Minh Trail, or in the north around the Plain of Jars. He was credited with finding the equivalent of an old-fashioned general store and turning it into a modern supermarket.

The swelling tide of American air power brought drastic changes to the war in Laos, and to Lair's life. Major Richard Secord reported for duty. He joined forces with Lair and Landry, and managed air operations in Laos. Lair now routinely scheduled targets for air strikes. A new covert unit, the Raven Forward Air Controllers, sprang into being to direct the increasing bombing raids. The increased CIA effort demanded greater staffing. A new enlarged headquarters building replaced AB-1 to accommodate the increase in newly assigned CIA staff. As the war escalated, there were turf conflicts within the US effort because it lacked a unified command structure.

An example of the difficulties inherent in the enlarged war was the siting of Lima Site 85 on a mountaintop at Phou Pha Thi, Laos. This clandestine guidance radar facility was proposed at a mid-1967 meeting chaired by General Hunter Harris. Its purpose was radar directed air raids into Hanoi. Lair's opinion of the installation was asked, as he was the local expert, and he was being charged with its defense. He predicted that the Vietnamese would build a road toward the radar site until they could attack it. When asked if LS 85 could be defended, Lair pointed out that guerrilla forces were not equipped or trained for fixed defensive battles. He recommended the use of special forces or other trained infantry for defense, but his request was rejected. In January 1968, North Vietnamese forces bypassed the site temporarily to attack royalist positions at the Battle of Nam Bac. Despite the PAVN's delay of the battle, Lair's prediction of Lima Site 85's fall was prophetic. The radar site was captured by Vietnamese sappers on 11 March 1968 even though Hmong guerrillas and Thai mercenaries remained on the mountain. Shackley had predicted in a cable to headquarters that the site could not hold out beyond 10 March. The accuracy of Shackley's estimate burnished his reputation in the agency.

==== Departure from Laos ====
At odds with both his station chief and Ambassador Sullivan, tagged with the loss of Lima Site 85, and diminished by the expanding American operations of the Laotian war, Bill Lair departed Laos in August 1968. He declined a possible assignment to the Phoenix Program in Vietnam. Lair, who had become the Lawrence of Arabia of Laos, left behind a 30,000 man guerrilla army.

He attended the Army War College, and was then stationed in Bangkok. Having concluded that he would never be promoted to chief of station anywhere, and knowing he was tagged as a Thai/Lao specialist within the CIA, he settled into bureaucracy in his wife's hometown. His title was assistant chief of station, and special operations naturally became his beat. When Leka, the exiled monarch of Albania arrived to buy weaponry, Lair prompted the Thai quashing of the arms deal. Most of Lair's duties, though, required him to keep track of the drug trade in the area. For the most part, the Thai senior officers involved in the opium trade had been trained by Lair. They knew him well enough to know his skepticism about banning drugs, and that he would not retaliate on them. They also knew the king favored him, and that Lair's in-laws were politically influential. Lair would simply ask these officers for needed information, bypassing all the rigamarole of tasking undercover agents to spy upon the drug trade.

Lair was still working in Bangkok when the Vietnam War ended. On 18 June 1975, Vang Pao visited Bangkok on his way into exile in Missoula, Montana. Lair wished the Hmong general good luck. At about the same time, Lair was consulted about the possibility of paramilitary operations in Cambodia. He recommended against the attempt because the communists already controlled the countryside.

Bill Lair would pull off one more intelligence coup before his retirement. Siddhi Savetsila, Lair's brother-in-law, was a member of a Thai delegation that visited the hospital room of a dying Mao Tse-tung. Lair channeled the resulting intelligence back to Washington, DC. Both President Gerald Ford and Secretary of State Henry Kissinger were thus made privy to details of the maneuvering of possible successors to the Great Helmsman. Despite this, CIA management told Lair they had no domestic assignment for him after Bangkok. Lair decided to retire. He was honored by King Bhumipol with a private audience before he departed.

== Post CIA career ==
Bill Lair retired from the CIA as a GS-16, the civil service equivalent of a brigadier general. He was 53 years old, with two grown children in college. He had a ranch to retire to, near Waco, but no means of cashing in on his life experience except a return to Thailand. Refusing to trade on his old friendships overseas, he instead became a long haul trucker. His past Asian expertise would be called upon only once more, in 1992, when he was again asked about the chances of setting up a paramilitary network in Cambodia. He again deemed it impossible.

James William Lair continued to be prominent in Hmong-American affairs. On 4 July 2013, he was honored with an 89th birthday celebration by the Hmong-American community, including a reunion with the Hmong Laotian Civil War veterans with whom he had served. Lair died on October 28, 2014.

== Honour ==
- Thailand :
  - Member of the Order of the Crown of Thailand
  - Border Service Medal
  - King Rama IX Royal Cypher Medal
  - 25th Buddhist Century Celebration Medal
