= J. Vinton Lawrence =

American artist and CIA paramilitary officer (1939–2016)

J. Vinton "Vint" Lawrence (June 25, 1939 – April 9, 2016) was an artist and U.S. Central Intelligence Agency paramilitary officer from their elite Special Activities Division. Under the name of "James Vinton", he was stationed in Laos from 1962 to 1966 and had a close relationship with the Hmong leader Vang Pao in the U.S. war in Southeast Asia. Lawrence's CIA colleague in Laos was the CIA paramilitary expert Anthony Poshepny (a.k.a. "Tony Poe").

Lawrence was married to National Public Radio reporter Anne Garrels. His letters to her during her time in Baghdad, Iraq, during the 2003 U.S. invasion of that country, are included in her book, Naked in Baghdad (ISBN 0-374-52903-5). He toured with her and shared the podium with her during her book readings. He and his wife received an AudioFile Earphones Award for their narration. An artist by profession, he occasionally wrote about U.S. foreign policy issues. As an illustrator and caricaturist he was regularly employed by The New Republic and The Washington Post. He died on April 9, 2016.

Lawrence was the great-grandson of Charles A. Coffin, cofounder and first president of General Electric corporation.

== See also ==
- Laotian Civil War
- James William Lair
- Vietnam War
- Jerry Daniels
- Kingdom of Laos
- North Vietnamese invasion of Laos
- Lao Veterans of America
- Laos Memorial
- Anthony Poshepny
- Alfred W. McCoy
- Nugan Hand Bank
