= Mobile Guerrilla Force =

Mobile guerrilla forces were guerrilla warfare elements in the Vietnam War in 1966 and 1967. United States Army Special Forces trained and led the units, created in the fall of 1966, during refinement and amplification of the mobile strike concept.

== Purpose ==
These guerrilla units were organized, trained, and equipped to operate in remote areas previously considered to be Viet Cong or North Vietnamese Army havens. Usually almost no reconnaissance or clearing operations had been carried out in such territory. Instituted as economy of force units, the troops of the mobile guerrilla forces would infiltrate an area to interdict enemy routes, conduct surveillance, seek out enemy forces and installations, and collect intelligence along their axis of advance. Viet Cong base camps were found, watched, and raided if possible, or were harassed if the enemy was too well defended and organized. Lines of communication were cut by means of raids and ambushes, and were planted with mines and booby traps. Storage areas for supplies were found and eliminated, and air strikes were directed and the results assessed.

== Operations ==
A mobile guerrilla force unit was inserted into its assigned tactical area of operations by the most unobtrusive means available. Once in the area of operations, the unit became a true guerrilla force in every respect except that of living solely off the land. Selected items of resupply were delivered by air. The guerrilla force operated from mobile bases, and the troops were capable of remaining and operating in a particular area for thirty to sixty days. The guerrilla force required complete freedom of action within a specified area of operations in order to achieve success. For this reason, once an area was designated for the conduct of an operation, the mobile guerrilla force "owned" that area—including control of air support.

== Advantages ==
The guerrilla forces had essentially the same desirable characteristics as the mobile strike forces with the following exceptions: the mobile guerrilla force troops were highly responsive to the needs of the Special Forces companies in each of the four corps tactical zones in that operational control rested with the Special Forces company commander for the mobile guerrilla force located in his corps tactical zone; each mobile guerrilla force unit was wholly commanded and controlled by a Special Forces A detachment (the mobile strike forces went under joint U.S.-Vietnamese Special Forces command in December 1966); and each mobile guerrilla force unit was trained to operate as an independent unit with no reinforcement or mutual support.

== Organization ==
The basic organization of the mobile guerrilla forces was the same as that of the mobile strike forces, with a 34-man combat reconnaissance platoon added as an organic unit. The mobile guerrilla force unit was organized without a weapons platoon, but an M60 machine gun squad was included in the company headquarters. The combat reconnaissance platoon could be employed in advance of the mobile guerrilla force to provide reconnaissance, establish an initial resupply point, and gather intelligence. The combat reconnaissance platoon secured the patrol base and received the first resupply pending the arrival of the rest of the force. To avoid disclosing their position, mobile guerrilla force troops on many occasions were resupplied entirely through the use of modified, 500-pound napalm containers of prepackaged, code-identified bundles delivered by A1E-type aircraft in what seemed to be a normal air strike.

== Bibliography ==
- Guerrilla Force, James C. Donahue
- Blackjack-33, James C. Donahue
- Blackjack-34, James C. Donahue
