= Thomas Fosmire =

American CIA Officer (1930–2007)

Thomas George Fosmire (31 August 1930, Milwaukee – 4 November 2007, Florence) joined the Central Intelligence Agency's Special Operations Group of Special Activities Division as a Paramilitary Officer in the 1950s and was given responsibility (along with Tony Poe) in training Tibetan tribesmen to fight against the Chinese Communists in the early part of his career. The training occurred first at a base on Saipan in the Marianas islands but was later moved to a colder mountainous climate at Camp Hale, Colorado. One battalion was trained at Camp Peary, near Williamsburg, Virginia. After the Tibetan operation concluded, Fosmire landed with Tony Poe in Sumatra, Indonesia to supply and train mutinous forces there in an effort by the Eisenhower administration to destabilize the non-aligned regime of Sukarno. He and Poe were evacuated from Sumatra by US Navy submarine when the troops they were training fled to the mountains. In the late 1960s and early 70s he served in Laos and South Vietnam during the Vietnam War. In the 1980s, Fosmire served in El Salvador and Honduras, training Nicaraguan rebel troops opposed to the Sandinista government. Fosmire was twice awarded the Intelligence Medal of Merit.
