= Pat Landry =

Lloyd C. "Pat" Landry was a Paramilitary Officer in the Special Activities Division of the Central Intelligence Agency during the 1950s up until the 1970s.

== 1950s ==
Landry joined Central Intelligence Agency in the early 1950s following combat service in the U.S. Army in World War II.

== 1961 ==
Landry was sent to Laos in 1961 and became Deputy Chief of Operations under Bill Lair.

== 1968 ==
When the war in Laos escalated in 1968, command and control of SOG operations was split between the north-central theater centered on operations for control of the Plain of Jars and operations in the southern Laos Panhandle, aimed at controlling the Bolovens Plateau in order to maintain pressure on Vietnamese logistics along the Ho Chi Minh Trail. The command center was relocated from Vientiane to Udorn Royal Thai Air Base in northern Thailand. Agency officials wanted Lair to remain in command at Udorn and for Landry to remain in Vientiane to command the southern operations group. Landry refused the promotion in order to remain Lair's deputy at Udorn. The move to Udorn made sense because that large base was capable of supporting an enormous Air Branch flight and maintenance program, as well as serving as the center of Agency theater photo-reconnaissance and photo-analysis efforts in support of SOG special operations in the Laos theater of operations. Udorn housed a large contingent of Air American platforms as well as US Air Force combat resources.

In later years, Landry owned and operated (along with the "Dragon Lady") several "watering holes" in Thailand, including the Cowboy (Lone Star) Bar in Washington Square, Bangkok.

== Sources ==
- Conboy, Kenneth J., and James Morrison. Feet to the Fire: CIA Covert Operations in Indonesia, 1957-1958. Naval Institute Press, 1999. ISBN 1557501939, 9781557501936.
