= BirdAir =

Defunct US airline operating mostly in Laos

BirdAir was an airline owned by the construction company Bird & Sons, Inc which served in Southeast Asia during the Vietnam War.

== Background ==
Bird & Sons, Inc was a San Francisco heavy construction company operating in Vietnam and Laos that maintained its own air division. William H. Bird had been operating an aviation division of his construction company Bird & Son in Laos since 1960. Bird later sold the air division and its aircraft to Continental, $4.5 million cash, in 1964 to form CASI. When Bird sold that division there was a non-compete clause in his contract with Continental that precluded Bird from operating another aviation company in Laos for a certain number of years. When that time expired, Bird got back into the air charter business and created BirdAir.

BirdAir operated Lockheed C-130s on loan from the United States Air Force and participated in the evacuation of former Hmong guerrilla troops in Laos. BirdAir also helped maintain the air bridge to Phnom Penh flying from U-Tapao to Phnom Penh daily in February and March 1975 until the day before the country fell.

== Aircraft ==
=== Bird and Sons Aviation Division ===
The aviation division of Bird and Sons, Inc. included 22 aircraft and 350 employees, with some of Bird and Son's aircraft continuing to be registered to Bird & Sons Inc. even after the take-over by CASI.

Note: Not all the following listed aircraft were operated at the same time.

- 1× Beech 18
- 1× Beech D50C Twin Bonanza
- 1× Bell 47G-3B-1 Sioux
- 3× Bell 205
- 6× Bell 206 JetRangers, 3 206As and 3 206Bs
- 1× Camair 480 - a Ryan Navion converted to twin engines by Cameron Aircraft Co.
- 2× Cessna 180
- 1× Cessna 206
- 9× Curtiss C-46 Commando
- 12× Dornier Do 28 (inc x11 A1s and x1 B1)
- 8× Douglas DC-3/C-47 Skytrain
- 3× Douglas DC-6A/B (leased from Concare)
- 5× Helio 395 Super Courier
- 2× Lockheed PV-2 Ventura
- 33× Pilatus PC-6 Porter & Turbo Porter
- 6× Scottish Aviation Twin Pioneer Series 2

=== BirdAir ===
Bird Air was later reported to be operating DC-6s and USAF C-130s in 1975 in support of the Cambodian government.
