= Anthony Poshepny =

American CIA paramilitary officer (1924–2003)

Anthony Alexander Poshepny
- Born: September 18, 1924; Long Beach, California, U.S.
- Died: June 27, 2003 (aged 78); California, U.S.
- Education: San Jose State University
- Military career
- Allegiance: United States of America
- Branch: United States Marine Corps; Central Intelligence Agency
- Rank: Sergeant (USMC); Paramilitary Operations Officer (CIA)
- Units: U.S. Marine Corps: 2nd Marine Parachute Battalion; 5th Marine Division; Central Intelligence Agency: Special Activities Division
- Conflicts: World War II: Guadalcanal campaign; Battle of Iwo Jima; Korean War; Permesta Rebellion; Vietnam War; Laotian Civil War
- Awards: Intelligence Star (twice), Purple Heart (twice), Air Force Commendation Medal, Marine Corps Good Conduct Medal, American Campaign Medal, Asiatic-Pacific Campaign Medal, World War II Victory Medal, Order of the Million Elephants and the White Parasol, Order of the White Elephant, Border Service Medal (Thailand) Parachutist Badge

Anthony Alexander Poshepny (September 18, 1924 – June 27, 2003), known as Tony Poe, was an American CIA Paramilitary Operations Officer in what became the Special Activities Division (renamed Special Activities Center in 2016). He was known for controversial actions during his service in Laos with Special Guerilla Units (SGUs) under the command of General Vang Pao, a U.S.-funded secret army in Laos during the Vietnam War, and may be one of the individuals who inspired the character Colonel Kurtz in the movie Apocalypse Now. (Note: Filmmaker Francis Ford Coppola himself denies that Poe was a primary influence and says the character was loosely based on Special Forces Colonel Robert B. Rheault, who was the actual head of 5th Special Forces Group (May to July 1969), and whose 1969 arrest over the murder of suspected double agent Thai Khac Chuyen in Nha Trang generated substantial contemporary news coverage in the Green Beret Affair.)

== Early life and career ==
Poshepny was born September 18, 1924, in Long Beach, California, to John Charles and Isabel M. (née Veriziano) Poshepny. His father was a United States Navy officer whose parents were immigrants from Bohemia. His mother was born in Guam. When he was eight years old, his nine-year-old brother John accidentally shot him in the stomach with the family rifle, and he nearly bled to death.

Shortly after turning 18, he enlisted in the United States Marine Corps during World War II, serving in the 2nd Marine Parachute Battalion and fighting in the 5th Marine Division on Iwo Jima.

He received the Purple Heart twice and was a sergeant by the time he was honorably discharged. Returning to civilian life, he enrolled at Saint Mary's College, before transferring to what is now San Jose State University. He contemplated going to work for the FBI. Graduating in 1950, he instead joined the CIA, where he was part of the first recruit class to receive all of its training at the new Camp Peary. He was active in Korea during the Korean War, training refugees for sabotage missions in the North. He also trained anti-Communist forces for missions against China.

Following the Korean war, Poshepny joined the Bangkok-based CIA front company Overseas Southeast Asia Supply (SEA Supply), which provided military equipment to Kuomintang forces based in Burma. In 1958, Poshepny tried unsuccessfully to arrange a military uprising against Sukarno, the president of Indonesia. From 1958 to 1960, he trained different groups, including Tibetan Khampas and Hui Muslims at Camp Hale for anti-government operations inside China. Carole McGranahan quotes Poe from an interview that the Tibetans he trained "... were the best I ever worked with."

== Laos ==
The CIA awarded Poshepny the Intelligence Star in 1959. Two years later, working under James William Lair, he was assigned with J. Vinton Lawrence to train Hmong hill tribes in Laos to fight against the North Vietnamese forces and the Pathet Lao. Poshepny's practices were described as barbaric when they later came to light. He paid Hmong fighters to bring him the ears of dead enemy soldiers, and on at least one occasion mailed a bag of ears to the U.S. Embassy in Vientiane to verify his body counts. He dropped severed heads onto enemy locations twice in a grisly psy-op. The CIA eventually extracted Poshepny from Laos in 1970 and assigned him to a training camp in Thailand until his retirement in 1974. He received another Intelligence Star in 1975.

== Retirement and death ==
After the United States withdrew from Vietnam, Poshepny remained in Thailand with his Hmong wife and four children. He moved the family to California in the 1990s. He frequently appeared at Hmong veterans' gatherings and helped veterans immigrate and settle in the US. He defended his controversial acts during the war to reporters and historians, claiming they were necessary response to fight the war. He died in California on June 27, 2003, aged 78. Prior to his death, he had joined others in calling for a memorial to the Hmong who had fought in Laos; the memorial was ultimately established in Arlington National Cemetery in 2018. An exhibit about Poshepny is on display at the Patpong Museum in Bangkok, Thailand.

A number of press stories have implied that Poshepny was the model for Colonel Walter Kurtz in the film Apocalypse Now, though director Francis Ford Coppola has denied this, citing Robert B. Rheault as the actual inspiration.

== See also ==
- Air America
- Hmong people
- Laos Memorial
- Royal Lao Army
- Kingdom of Laos
- Lao Veterans of America
- North Vietnamese invasion of Laos

== Declassified reading ==
- CIA and the Generals, Covert Support to Military Government in South Vietnam
- CIA and the House of Ngo, Covert Action in South Vietnam, 1954–63
- CIA and Rural Pacification
- Good Questions, Wrong Answers CIA's Estimates of Arms Traffic through Sihanoukville, Cambodia, During the Vietnam War.
- The Way We Do Things, Black Entry Operations into Northern Vietnam
- Undercover Armies, CIA and Surrogate Warfare in Laos
