= International Agreement on the Neutrality of Laos =

1962 agreement of Laotian neutrality

The International Agreement on the Neutrality of Laos was an international agreement signed in Geneva on July 23, 1962, between 14 states, including Laos, as a result of the International Conference on the Settlement of the Laotian Question, which lasted from May 16, 1961, to July 23, 1962.

The Union of Burma, the Kingdom of Cambodia, Canada, the People's Republic of China, the Democratic Republic of Vietnam, France, India, the Polish People's Republic, the Republic of Vietnam, Thailand, the Soviet Union, the United Kingdom, and the United States signed the declaration. It and the statement of neutrality by the Royal Lao Government of July 9, 1962 came into force as an international agreement on July 23, the date of signature.

== Background ==
After a brief occupation of Laos by the Japanese at the end of World War II and a declaration of independence by Laotian nationalists. The French reoccupied Laos and the rest of French Indochina, which included Vietnam and Cambodia. In 1950, the Indochinese communists formed the Pathet Lao, a Laotian revolutionary movement and a Viet Minh ally in the struggle against France. After the French defeat, the Geneva Accords of 1954 affirmed Laos sovereignty. In 1960, civil war broke out between the Royal Lao Army, supported by the United States, against the Pathet Lao insurgents, supported by the communists in North Vietnam.

== Agreements ==
In April of 1961 the British and Soviet cochairs of the 1954 conference proposed to India to reconvene the International Commission for Supervision and Control for Laos, which had been adjourned in 1958 at the request of the RLG.Thirteen governments, including all those of the Southeast Asian Peninsula, the United States, and the PRC, participated in two months of open negotiations seeking a diplomatic settlement. During this time the Soviet Union, France, and India each submitted draft protocols. France also submitted a draft Declaration on Neutrality to be made by the Laotian government, while both France and India submitted draft declaration to be signed in response by the participants. Recently-elected American president John K. Kennedy believed in diplomacy as a resolution to the conflict, although the United States' only contribution during this period was supplementary articles to the French draft protocol.

Closed sessions lasted from July 1961 to 1962 In 1962 and produced a Declaration on the Neutrality of Laos signed by a newly-formed three-part coalition government representing the pro-American, pro-communist, and neutralist factions, committing to building "a peaceful, neutral, independent, democratic, unified and prosperous Laos" and a number of specific steps towards this end. The Laotian government pledged to promulgate constitutionally its commitments, which would have the force of law.

The 13 powers signed a responding declaration pledging to respect Laotian neutrality and to refrain from direct or indirect interference in the internal affairs of Laos, drawing Laos into military alliances, or establishing military bases in Laotian territory.

== Aftermath ==
The agreement was contravened almost immediately by the Pathet Lao, North Vietnam, the United States, the Soviet Union, and the People's Republic of China. North Vietnam continued to garrison 7000 soldiers in Laos. The Soviet Union and the People's Republic of China provided military support to the Pathet Lao. The United States started a bombing campaign that supported both the Royal Laotian Government and American efforts in South Vietnam. The Pathet Lao continued to attack and to harass the neutralist forces.

The violations exemplified the conduct of all of the parties for the remainder of the Second Indochina War.

In 1959, North Vietnam had already established a supply line through "neutral" Laotian territory to supply the Viet Cong insurgency against South Vietnam government. The communists called the supply line the "Trường Sơn Strategic Supply Route (Đường Trường Sơn)." The Pathet Lao and the North Vietnamese continued to use and to improve the supply route, which would become known as the Ho Chi Minh Trail. Thousands of Vietnamese troops were stationed in Laos to maintain the road network and to provide for its security. Vietnamese military personnel also fought beside the Pathet Lao in its struggle to overthrow the neutralist government of Laos. The co-operation persisted after the war and the communist victory in Laos.
