= Royal Lao Army Airborne =

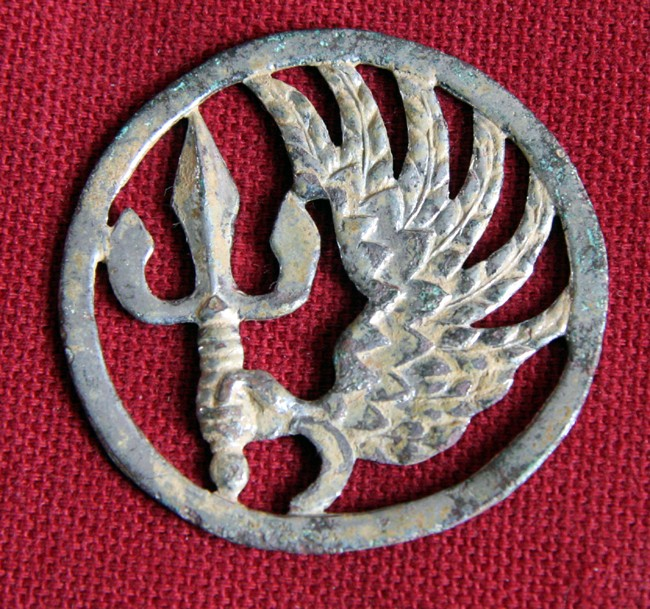
- Royal Laotian Army Paratroopers beret cap badge, used between 1961 and 1975
- Active: 1 July 1948 – 2 May 1975
- Country: Kingdom of Laos
- Allegiance: Royal Lao Government
- Branch: Royal Lao Army
- Type: Special forces
- Role: Airborne force
- Size: (unknown)
- Part of: Royal Lao Armed Forces
- Headquarters: Chinaimo, Wattay, near Vientiane; Seno, near Savannakhet
- Nicknames: CCPL, CCL, BPL, BP, GM (in French)
- Anniversaries: 1 July
- Engagements: First Indochina War; Battle of Sam Neua; Battle of Moung Peun; Laotian Civil War; Battle of Vientiane; Battle of Tha Thom; Battle of Luang Namtha; Battle of Lak Sao; Battle of Nam Bac; Battle of Xieng Khouangville; Battle of Muang Soui

Commanders
- Notable commanders: Sourith Don Sasorith; Kong Le; Thao Ty; Deuane Sunnalath; Thao Ma; Deuane Siphraseuth; Sisamouth Sananikone

The Royal Lao Army Airborne was composed of the élite paratrooper battalions of the Royal Lao Army (RLA), the land component of the Royal Lao Armed Forces (commonly known by its French acronym FAR), which operated during the First Indochina War and the Laotian Civil War from 1948 to 1975.

== History ==
The Laotian paratroopers owed their origin and traditions to the French airborne forces of the First Indochina War, and even after years of American, Filipino, Indonesian, and Thai assistance the distinctive French influence could be seen. Along with the irregular ethnic Special Guerrilla Units (SGUs), the regular airborne and para-commando battalions were the most effective units in the RLA.

=== First Indochina War operations 1948–1954 ===
The first Laotian airborne unit was formed on 1 July 1948, when the detached 3rd Company from the 1st Laotian Rifle Battalion (1er Bataillon de Chasseurs Laotiens – 1er BCL) began airborne training and was renamed the 1st Laotian Para-Commando Company (1ére Compagnie de Commandos Parachutistes Laotiens – 1ére CCPL) of the French Union Army. By September, 1ére CCPL strength had risen to a headquarters (HQ) section and three commando sections, totalling 132 Laotians and 22 French officers and senior NCOs seconded from the French Far East Expeditionary Corps (CEFEO) parachute units. During the same month, the 1ére CCPL headquarters and an airborne training centre taught by French instructors were established at the French Air Force's Wattay Airbase just outside Vientiane, Laos' capital city. On 11 May 1949, 1ére CCPL performed its first combat jump, dropping 18 commandos to reinforce the Luang Namtha garrison. Six more airborne operations were conducted by the company during the year, including a 112-man jump to reinforce Sam Neua in Sam Neua Province, close to the Laotian-Vietnamese border, on 16 December. On 29 April 1951 the company was increased to six commando sections. In October, however, Commandos 4, 5, and 6 were removed to form the 2nd Company of the new 1st Laotian Parachute Battalion. The remainder of 1ére CCPL conducted five airborne reinforcement jumps around the country during the year. On 1 March 1952 1ére CCPL was renamed 1st Laotian Commando Company (1ére Compagnie de Commandos Laotiens – 1ére CCL). Numerous jumps were conducted during the year, mostly as part of counter-insurgency sweeps north of Vientiane. On 27 April 1953 1ére CCL was dropped at the Nam Bac valley, north of Luang Prabang to establish a forward defensive line in face of a Vietminh invasion. The company was decimated, and could not reconstitute its headquarters section and four commando sections until 4 August. On 15 June 1954 the company was transferred from the French Union Army to the Laotian National Army (Armée Nationale Laotiènne – ANL), changing its name to 1st Group of Laotian Para-Commandos (1er Groupement de Commandos Parachutistes Laotiens – 1er GCPL). All French officers left the group by August, after being replaced by hand-picked Laotian officers and NCOs.

A second airborne unit, the 1st Laotian Parachute Battalion (1er Bataillon de Parachutistes Laotiens – 1er BPL), began forming in October 1951. By 1 April 1952 the battalion was brought to strength with 853 officers and enlisted men, divided into a headquarters and three companies. Based at Camp Chinaimo, a major military facility located on the eastern outskirts of Vientiane, 1er BPL participated in twenty operations, six involving parachute jumps, during 1952. On 15–24 December 576 members of the unit conducted a reinforcement drop into Sam Neua garrison during Operation "Noel". Eighty more members of the battalion jumped into Sam Neua in February 1953, enabling the BPL to create a fourth company. On 15 April 1953, the Vietminh invaded northeastern Laos with 40,000 troops commanded by General Võ Nguyên Giáp and crushed the Sam Neua garrison, sending remnants of the BPL fleeing toward the Plain of Jars. A month later, the battalion was reconstituted at Chinaimo, and conducted several reconnaissance and commando operations north of Luang Prabang – such as Operation "Dampieres" in September 1953 – for the remainder of the year. In March 1954 the BPL began preparing for Operation "Condor", the planned relief of the besieged Dien Bien Phu garrison in North Vietnam. During April and early May the battalion advanced toward the Laotian-Vietnamese border, but was withdrawn in mid-May after the garrison fell. On 18 June the BPL regrouped at Seno, a French military base located about 30 km (20 miles) east of Savannakhet. From 2–4 August the battalion performed the last airborne operation of the First Indochina War, jumping into the town of Phanop in Khammouane Province to link up with local militia units and sweep the territory up to the strategic Mụ Giạ Pass, located in the Annamite Range on the Laotian-Vietnamese border.

The fall of Dien Bien Phu brought the Indochina War to a close and drove the French government to enter into peace negotiations with the Vietminh. Following the signing of the Agreement on the Cessation of Hostilities in Laos on 20 July 1954 and the implementation of the Indochina ceasefire on 6 August, the 981-strong BPL was brought back to Seno and turned over to the ANL. After French officers left the BPL in October, the name of the unit was simplified to 1st Parachute Battalion (1er Bataillon Parachutiste – 1er BP).

=== Post-war operations 1955–1960 ===
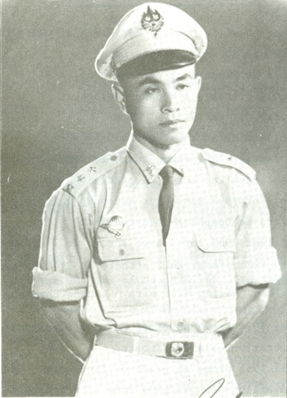
Captain Kong Le, c.1954

In 1955, 1ére GCPL was integrated with 1er BP at Seno. The reinforced battalion conducted a parachute reinforcement jump into Muong Peun during the year. A 2nd Parachute Battalion (2e Bataillon de Parachutistes – 2e BP) began to be formed at Wattay in 1957, being brought to strength the following year after the return from the Philippines of a Laotian contingent trained at the Scout Ranger course at Fort William McKinley in Manila. Although both units were grouped into an understrength two-battalion Airborne Regiment, they were deployed at different locations: 2e BP, based at Wattay, was given responsibility for operations in northern Laos while 1er BP, based at Seno, handled missions in the southern provinces of the country.

The deteriorating domestic political situation towards the late 1950s, along with the threat posed by the home-grown Marxist Pathet Lao insurgency backed by the neighbouring Democratic Republic of Vietnam (e.g. North Vietnam), presented the largely unprepared Laotian Armed Forces (Forces Armées Laotiènnes – FAL) – officially created in July 1959 and redesignated in September 1961 the Royal Lao Armed Forces (Forces Armées du Royaume – FAR) – its first major challenges since the First Indochina War. Due to its poor state of readiness, the ANL (renamed in 1961 Royal Lao Army or RLA), had to rely almost exclusively on its crack parachute battalions to confront the Pathet Lao insurgents: in May 1959, 2e BP was dropped near Tha Thom, south of the Plain of Jars, to cut off a Pathet Lao guerrilla battalion fleeing toward the North Vietnamese border. The operation failed to prevent the guerrillas from crossing the border, however, and to further aggrieve matters, most of 2e BP fell ill with Malaria. The disease-ridden battalion was withdrawn to Wattay the following month. In July, the unit was rushed to Sam Neua to engage an alleged joint Pathet Lao/North Vietnamese Army (NVA) incursion that threatened the city. Although most of the ANL units had fled the area, 2e BP encountered only minimal insurgent activity and found no trace of NVA troops. On 29 July, 2e BP was sent again to Sam Neua Province in a futile attempt to reinforce local ANL outposts threatened by Pathet Lao attacks. On 22 August, 1er BP was brought up from Seno to conduct a parachute reinforcement jump into Moung Peun, and both battalions engaged in small skirmishes in northern Laos. However, disgruntled by the ANL's failure to pay their wages while they were on assignment, the deputy commander of 2e BP Captain Kong Le led his disaffected paratroopers to participate in the 25 December 1959 coup d'état that brought Major general Phoumi Nosavan to power. Although Prince Somsanith Vongkotrattana was appointed prime minister, true power rested in the hands of Maj. Gen. Phoumi, the defense minister of the new government and the de facto ruler of Laos.

In 1960, 2e BP was rushed down to Attapeu Province to counter increased Pathet Lao guerrilla activity in the region. The battalion carried out counter-insurgency sweeps along the Laotian-Cambodian border until flown back to Wattay on 27 April. To provide additional training for the Laotian para battalions, two new airborne training centres were established in February 1960 at Vang Vieng, located 17 Kilometers (10.56 miles) from Vientiane and set up with the help of U.S. Military Assistance Advisory Group (Laos) advisors, and at Seno, assisted by French Military Mission in Laos (Mission Militaire Française près du Gouvernment Royale du Laos) advisors. That same month, a company from 1er BP began receiving instruction at Vang Vieng and elements of 2e BP assembled there in April, but were withdrawn and parachuted north of Vientiane on 25 May in an unsuccessful attempt to apprehend a group of Pathet Lao political leaders that escaped from prison in the capital. Further airborne and Ranger training was provided by the Royal Thai Special Forces (RTSF) at their Special Warfare Centre and Recondo School co-located at Fort Narai in Lopburi Province, Thailand. Companies from 2e BP were rotated through Ft. Narai in the first half of 1960, followed by nearly the entire 1er BP on 6 June. At the same time, a new para battalion, 3e BP, was activated at Wattay.

=== Kong Le's Coup and the splintering of the Laotian Airborne Forces ===
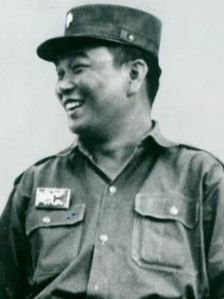
Major general Phoumi Nosavan, c.1960

As 1959 ended, the ANL undertook a wider offensive against the Pathet Lao, and most active in the counter-insurgency operations was the crack 2e BP led by Capt. Kong Le. When the situation worsened for the airborne forces after several weary months of combat, Kong Le decided to take matters into his own hands. On 9 August 1960, while most Royal Lao Government dignitaries were in Luang Prabang attending King Sisavang Vong's funeral, the 2e BP under the command of Capt. Kong Le seized control of Vientiane in a nearly bloodless coup d'état in order "to restore neutrality to Laos". After dissolving the right-wing cabinet of Prince Samsanith, Kong Le invited Prince Souvanna Phouma to form a neutralist coalition government and then announced that the new cabinet would be open to both the Royalists and the Marxist Pathet Lao. The latter took immediate advantage of Kong Le's offer, and began sending their forces into the capital. The Soviet Union assisted the Pathet Lao by airlifting in supplies and an NVA artillery battery equipped with captured M101A1 105mm Howitzers. However, the Royalists, with the growing approval (and active support) of the U.S. and Thailand, regrouped in Savannakhet under the command of Maj. Gen. Phoumi Nosavan and prepared for a counter-coup on Vientiane. The ANL split along political lines, with the parachute units joining the opposing factions: 1er BP returned from training in Thailand to Seno, and declared its loyalty to the Royalists; 3e BP, still four months from graduation, had one company defect to the Kong Le Neutralist faction; the remainder of the unit refused to support the Neutralists and were held hostage at Vientiane.

=== Early civil war operations 1960–1964 ===
During September 1960, a company of 1er BP was flown to reinforce Sam Neua in face of pressure from joint Neutralist/Pathet Lao forces. In the same month, 2e BP parachuted a team near Mahaxay to harass the Royalist forces. During November, another contingent from 1er BP was flown to Luang Prabang to reinforce Royalist elements. Later that month, the Royalists began their offensive to retake Vientiane, and by 8 December 1er BP had advanced to Paksane. Led by Defense Minister Maj. gen. Phoumi Nosavan, the Royalist forces launched a combined ground and airborne assault on Vientiane. Between 14 and 16 December, during the battle for Vientiane 1er BP was parachuted east of the Laotian capital, linking up with 3e BP and other sympathetic ANL units. Defeated after two days of fighting, Kong Le's Neutralist paratroopers and the Pathet Lao guerrilla forces withdrew north from the capital in an organized fashion, gathering recruits to the neutralist cause along the way. They then veered east, and conquered the strategic Plain of Jars in central Xieng Khouang Province by New Year's Eve. Once established on the Plain, Capt. Kong Le (self-appointed Major general in December 1962) set up a headquarters at the former Royal Lao Air Force (RLAF) Muang Soui airfield (designated Lima Site 108 or LS-108), and on 4 January 1961 he formed the Neutralist Armed Forces (Forces Armées Neutralistes – FAN). The Neutralists controlled the Plain of Jars from their Muang Soui HQ extending eastwards along Route 7 to the border with north Vietnam. Along with other ex-ANL units, both the 2e BP and the company from 3e BP provided the nuclei of the new force. The original 2e BP, which had swelled to six companies during the Battle of Vientiane in late 1960, was sub-divided, with each of the first five companies becoming a separate Neutralist para battalion – 1er, 2e, 3e, 4e, and 5e BPs – and the sixth company becoming an Airborne Training Centre at Muang Phanh in Xiangkhouang Province. However, because of the lack of transport aircraft, few of the Neutralist paratroopers were airborne-qualified.

Once secure in Vientiane, the ANL Command repeatedly delayed an all-out attack to recapture the Plain of Jars. On 2–3 January 1961, 1er BP was dropped on the southern edge of the Plain in an attempt to rally government forces, but was forced to withdraw on foot to Tha Thom by 8 January. Over the next month the Royal Lao Government attempted several offensives against the FAN. During this period, airborne designations became confused as new para battalions were added to the official order-of-battle. The elements of 1er BP occupying Tha Thom were redesignated 11er BP, and 12e BP was raised in Seno in mid-January, with two of its companies flown to Luang Prabang on 17 January. The understrength 3e BP remained stationed in Vientiane.

During February and March, 12e BP remained at Luang Prabang, 3e BP operated north of Vientiane, and 11er BP was kept at Tha Tom, where almost 100 paratroopers from 12e BP were dropped as reinforcements on 4 February. In addition, a new 55e BP had been raised at Seno, with elements of the battalion sent to Paksane. On 5 April, one company from the reconstituted 1er BP was dropped over Muong Kassy to trap a Neutralist contingent fighting along Route 13, the main paved road linking Vientiane with Luang Prabang; the remainder of the battalion was heli-lifted into the vicinity later that day. However, after ANL reinforcements failed to arrive, 1er BP was forced to evacuate on foot to Luang Prabang on 14 April. On 24 April, all airborne formations were gathered under a new regimental-sized Airborne Mobile Group 15 (Groupement Mobile 15 Aeroportée – GM 15) at Seno. During May, the understrength 3e BP and 12e BP were absorbed into 55e BP, leaving only 1er, 11er, and 55e BP in GM 15. For the remainder of 1961, GM 15 carried out small-scale sweeps north and east of Savannakhet.

By May 1961 a ceasefire was signed and hostilities dropped off. The Laotian army, renamed the Royal Lao Army (RLA) in September of that year, concentrated on small-scale sweeps until heavy fighting broke out again in February 1962 when the Pathet Lao began exerting heavy pressure on the north-western garrison at Luang Namtha. On 12 February, during the Battle of Luang Namtha, 1er BP was withdrawn from its static defense positions east of Savannakhet and parachuted into the town. As enemy pressure built around Luang Namtha, 55e BP and their assigned U.S. Special Forces (USSF) White Star Mobile Training Team advisors were dropped in on 27 March, followed by 11er BP on 16 April. After weeks of heavy enemy pressure during April, 1er BP began advancing towards the nearby enemy-held town of Muong Sing on 3 May. The battalion was smashed, sending the paratroopers fleeing back to Luang Namtha and on 5 May the garrison began to collapse, precipitating a mass exodus; over 2,000 RLA troops headed for the Thai border, many not stopping until they had crossed the Mekong River into Thailand. Only 55e BP offered any resistance, losing half of its strength in the process. Badly mauled, GM 15 was not reconstituted at Seno until 25 April. The Laotian paratroopers spent the rest of 1962 replacing their losses, and in the beginning of the following year, a revigorated 55e BP was sent on small-scale clearing operations in Military Region 5 (MR 5) (Pakse).

Under a new tripartite coalition government, peace in Laos lasted for six months. However, by early 1963 relations between the Pathet Lao and Maj. gen. Kong Le Neutralists began to fray, and on 6 April the Pathet Lao launched several simultaneous surprise attacks on FAN forces. That same month, Colonel Deuane Sunnalath (a former 2e BP company commander and Kong Le's chief rival) and Brig. gen. Kham Ouane Boupha defected the FAN with their troops, which included 1er BP and 4e BP, to form a separate faction called variously the "Deuanist Neutralists" or Patriotic Neutralists, and allied themselves with the Pathet Lao. The Neutralist 5e BP, stationed since 1962 at the central Laotian town of Nhommarath, was pulled back in June 1963 after clashing with Pathet Lao guerrillas. Heavy clashes flared across the Plain of Jars, and in early May 1964 a concerted Pathet Lao offensive swept across the strategic plain.

The remaining Neutralist forces pulled back west of the Plain of Jars; the Muang Phanh airborne training centre was shut down as the Pathet Lao offensive forced the training staff to relocate to Vang Vieng. Kong Le gathered his remaining loyal paratroopers of 2e BP and 5e BP, and turned back to the Royal Lao Government for support. Mindful of Kong Le's deceit in August 1960, the FAR High Command nevertheless entered into a loose alliance with the Neutralists. While maintaining the façade of a separate army, the FAN were effectively reduced to a subordinate branch of the RLA.

The alliance was put to test in November 1963, when the Neutralist 5e BP participated alongside the Royalist 11er and 55e BPs in the Battle of Lak Sao. That month, the RLA and the FAN agreed to cooperate on a joint ground operation against NVA and Pathet Lao forces in the upper Laotian panhandle. After assembling at Nhommarath, a RLA/FAN task-force under the command of General Sang Kittirath – which comprised 5e BP, one Royalist infantry battalion and one Neutralist armored company equipped with Soviet PT-76 amphibious light tanks – advanced northwards up Route 8 to relieve the isolated Lak Sao garrison, hoping to cut the North Vietnamese units in two by turning northeast towards the Nape Pass, an entry point to north Vietnam. Although the Laotian allied forces were initially successful, they were confronted by a vigorous North Vietnamese counter-attack on 15 December. While sending one column down Route 8 to engage the Laotian task-force head-on, the North Vietnamese also circled around southwards through the Mụ Giạ Pass to strike towards Nhommarath. The following day, 11er BP was dropped into Khamkheut and tried to work their way through up Route 8 to Lak Sao, but they were repulsed by the NVA and forced to retreat to Nak Sao, before returning to their original drop zone. When Khamkheut came under NVA mortar fire, 11er BP retreated an additional 6 kilometers (3.7 miles) west to the Nam Theun riverbank. With the battalion in risk of being destroyed, 55e BP was parachuted into Ban, east of Lak Sao to rescue 11er BP, but strong winds blew off-course half of the battalion over a ridge adjacent to the predicted drop zone. A second drop the following morning was more successful, and both para battalions bypassed Khamkheut to relieve the RLA garrison still holding their ground at Lak Sao. A confused withdrawal down Route 8 followed. By early January 1964, the RLA task-force – 5e BP included – had been chased from the field by the NVA and the Pathet Lao, and dispersed into the woods; they eventually regrouped at Thakhek. After coalescing at Phon Tiou, 55e BP provided cover to 11er BP as they successfully withdrew towards the Mekong River.

In July 1964 the RLA and the Neutralists went to the offensive again, when they launched Operation Triangle, the first combined arms operation of the Laotian Civil War, with the aim of recapturing the strategic Plain of Jars. After assembling separately at Luang Prabang, Vientiane and Muang Soui, a RLA/FAN task-force divided into three columns under the command of Major general Kouprasith Abhay – composed of the Neutralist 2e BP, two Mobile Groups (GMs) and three ADC hill tribal militia battalions backed by a Thai artillery battalion, with air support provided by the RLAF, Royal Thai Air Force (RTAF) and U.S. Raven Forward Air Controllers (a.k.a. Raven FACs) – converged on a three-pronged assault against an isolated Pathet Lao garrison occupying a vital intersection of Route 7 and 13 at Sala Phou Khoun. However, the operation was only a partial success since 2e BP was unable to capture Phou Kout Mountain, a Pathet Lao stronghold overlooking Muang Soui that blocked the RLA's advance into the Plain of Jars, after four failed attempts to seize the heights, in which they lost 106 men to enemy minefields.

In November 1964, the FAR units based at Savannakhet tried to replicate Operation Triangle's gains by launching Operation Victorious Arrow, a clearing operation east of Savannakhet toward Muong Phine spearheaded by GM 15; however, this initiative faltered short of its intended target. During the following year elements of each GM 15 para battalions were brought to Ft. Narai in Thailand for reconnaissance and commando training.

=== Reorganization and expansion 1965–1970 ===
On 1–3 February 1965, the Directorate of National Coordination (DNC) paramilitary security agency led by Brigadier general Siho Lamphouthacoul, which had held de facto control over Vientiane during the previous year, was defeated and disbanded by the RLA in the wake of another coup d'état led by Maj. gen. Kouprasith Abhay held that same month. Brig. gen. Siho was forced to exile in Thailand and after two days of negotiations, the DNC's three airborne-qualified Border Police Special Battalions (Bataillons Speciales – BS) – BS 33, BS 11, and BS 99 – and their commander, Lieutenant colonel Thao Ty agreed to lay down their arms with the option of transferring to the RLA's airborne forces. By mid-year they had been moved to Seno and consolidated into a new parachute regiment, Airborne Mobile Group 21 (Groupement Mobile 21 Aeroportée – GM 21) under Thao Ty's command. GM 21 quickly became the best airborne regiment in the RLA. In November 1965 the unit was rushed to Thakhek after two NVA infantry battalions came close to overrunning the town.

Meanwhile, Laotian airborne forces continued to expand with the creation of additional parachute regiments. In October 1966, Maj. gen. Kong Le went to exile in Indonesia and his Neutralist troops were reorganized into two Mobile Groups: GM 801, based at Muang Soui, was composed of the newly formed 85e BP and two regular infantry battalions, and GM 802, formed at Pakse out of 2e BP, 5e BP, and a reconstituted 4e BP. The airborne-qualified 1st Special Commando Battalion (1er Bataillon Commando Speciale – 1er BCS), which had been trained in 1965 by the Indonesian Army at their airborne training centre located at Batujajar, near Bandung, Indonesia, was disbanded and its members dispersed to the other para battalions.

During 1967, GM 15 remained in static defense positions around Muong Phalane in Savannakhet Province. One of its battalions, 55e BP, was briefly sent to the extreme north-western corner of the country to confront warring opium smugglers. GM 21 rotated two of its para battalions to Military Region 4 (MR 4) for operations around Khong Sedone, Saravane, and Lao Ngam.

In the opening days of January 1968, the Laotian airborne forces faced perhaps their greatest test at the Battle of Nam Bac, when the entire GM 15 was rushed to the namesake valley to reinforce the local RLA garrison, which was under heavy pressure by the NVA's 316th Division. On 8 January, with pressure nearing the breaking point, 99e BP was landed north of the garrison, but failed to prevent it from been successfully encircled by the NVA. The following day, the garrison fell when about a third of the RLA troops defending it began withdrawing from the Nam Bac valley. However, the withdrawal turned into a rout on January 13 when the NVA launched their final assault on the garrison, which came out of a heavy mist and hit the RLA command post, cutting its radio communications with the defenders. The Nam Bac debacle was a shattering defeat for the FAR, from which they never managed to recover, and a severe blow to the prestige of its Airborne Forces since it resulted in the total destruction of 99e BP and the near disintegration of GM 15.

In August, all Mobile Groups in the Laotian ground forces were abolished and replaced by independent battalions. The two battalions of GM 21 and the remnants of GM 15 were consolidated into three new independent para battalions, the 101er, 102e, and 103e BPs based at Seno. The Neutralist Mobile Groups were not disbanded until the following year after GM 801 was crushed at Muang Soui and brought to Thailand for retraining. The para elements of GM 801 were regrouped into the new 208th Commando Battalion (Bataillon Commando 208 – BC 208), and sent to Vang Vieng. From GM 802, 5e BP was converted into 104e BP, and the other airborne elements were gathered into the 207th Commando Battalion (Bataillon Commando 207 – BC 207). Both 104e BP and BC 207 were stationed at Pakse.

During 1969, the three airborne battalions of the RLA were shuttled across the country in reinforcement operations. In January, all three BPs launched successful attacks east of Savannakhet into North Vietnamese-held territory. One battalion was then heli-lifted into Thateng in Military Region 4 on 4 April. 103e BP was sent to northern Laos to help RLA units briefly capture the enemy-held town of Xieng Khouangville in Xieng Khouang Province. In July, during Operation Off Balance, 101er BP was heli-lifted to Ban Na, southeast of Muang Soui to support Hmong SGU and RLA forces in their unsuccessful counter-offensive to recapture the namesake RLAF airfield, which had been seized previously by the NVA's 312th Division during the Toan Thang Campaign earlier in June. In August, during the successful Operation About Face, 101er BP assisted two RLA infantry battalions in the capture of Moung Phanh from the NVA, and in September, 101er BP replaced 103e BP in the north and was used in another unsuccessful attempt to recapture the town of Muang Soui.

=== The final years 1971–75 ===
In 1970, 101er BP was sent to Luang Prabang to halt a NVA advance toward the city, and during Operation Honorable Dragon in December that year 102e BP was in turn sent to reinforce a Special Guerrilla Group staging base, PS 22, on the eastern rim of the Bolovens Plateau.

In mid-1971, following the fall of the southern city of Paksong to the NVA, the Neutralist 104e BP and BC 207 were used during a prolonged FAR counter-offensive to retake the city. Also used was the RLA's 7th Infantry Battalion (7éme Bataillon de Infanterie – 7e BI) based at Pakse, which had been allowed to send some of its men through airborne training at Seno, because its commander was the brother of the Military Region 4 (MR 4) commander, Brigadier general Soutchay Vongsavanh. Late that year, with the Vietnamisation process in full swing in South Vietnam, a similar effort was attempted towards making the completely demoralized and reduced in strength RLA a more effective, self-sufficient force. Following a U.S. Army system of organization, the regular infantry and paratrooper and commando battalions were consolidated into two light infantry divisions, formally created on 23 March 1972 and locally designated as "Strike Divisions" (Divisions d'infanterie d'Intervention). Based at Luang Prabang, the 1st Strike Division (1er Division d'infanterie d'Intervention) commanded by Brig. Gen. Bounchanh Savathphayphane, was tasked with operations in northern Laos whilst the 2nd Strike Division (2éme Division d'infanterie d'Intervention), commanded by Brig. Gen. Thao Ty and based at Seno, was oriented towards the south. The three independent airborne battalions – 101er, 102e, and 103e BPs – were dissolved and integrated into the new 22nd Brigade of the 2nd Strike Division.

In May 1974 the FAR High Command dissolved the ineffective 1st and 2nd Strike Divisions and elements of latter's three understrength brigades were re-organized into three new parachute battalions, the 711er, 712e, and 713e BPs, grouped into the RLA's new 7th Para Brigade (7éme Brigade de Parachutistes) which began forming at Seno under the command of Col. Bounthavy Phousangiem. In the process, they absorbed SPECOM, a battalion-sized Special Forces' unit also part of the 2nd Strike Division, converted into the brigade's fourth parachute battalion, 714e BP. Elements of 714e BP were deployed in early 1975 to Thakhek to reinforce local Royal Lao Police and RLA infantry units in an unsuccessful attempt to quell pro-communist demonstrations. The 7th Para Brigade, along with the other independent BPs and airborne-qualified Commando units, were disbanded after Pathet Lao guerrilla forces took control of Vientiane on 23 August 1975; some ex-members of these airborne formations did manage though to escape from Laos to Thailand and ultimately, to exile in France and the United States.

== List of Laotian Airborne commanders ==
- Sourith Don Sasorith
- Kong Le
- Thao Ty
- Thao Ma
- Deuane Sunnalath
- Deuane Siphraseuth
- Sisamouth Sananikone
- Sy Syxiengmay
- Bounthavy Phousangiem

== Structure and organization ==
Royal Laotian parachutist badge

The RLA Airborne command strength varied considerably over time, comprising several hundred officers and enlisted men organized firstly into independent companies, then battalions grouped into regiments, and ultimately into brigades. The Laotian paratroopers were all airborne-qualified volunteers, and like their South Vietnamese ARVN Airborne Division counterparts, they received (theoretically) better pay, rations, quarters, and family benefits than the common RLA soldier. They were also given high-quality leadership, with several former airborne commanders raising to the command of other RLA formations and FAR branches. By the late 1950s, the basic airborne unit in the Laotian ground forces had become the parachute battalion (Bataillon de Parachutistes – BP). A Laotian BP was organized according to the French Army model into a battalion headquarters (HQ) & support company, and three rifle companies. Each rifle company generally had an HQ section, and three to four commando sections (each broken into 12-men teams in the para-commando companies); sometimes a fourth heavy weapons company was added to the battalion, specially in the case of the para-commando battalions. This system of organization remained virtually unchanged throughout the Indochina and Laotian civil wars.

Long-standing major airborne formations above battalion level, were virtually nonexistent at the time though between November 1960 and February 1965 the paratrooper battalions began to be brought together to form loosely organized Airborne Mobile Groups (Groupements mobiles aeroportées – GMs). This was a tactical expedient inherited from the French who had employed it previously during the First Indochina War. Being essentially a regimental-sized combat task-force, a typical Laotian GM consisted of two or three battalions' assembled for specific operations. Originally raised on a temporary basis, the Mobile Groups were re-structured in April 1961 as permanent units, and by late 1966 the RLA fielded three airborne regiments, GM 15, GM 21, GM 802, and the mixed GM 801. The Mobile Groups' structure was retained until August 1968, when all airborne GMs in the Laotian ground forces were abolished and replaced by four independent para battalions and two para-commando battalions. Later in the war, four para battalions created out of the dissolution of the 2nd Strike Division, were consolidated in May 1974 into the first truly large airborne formation of the RLA, the 7th Para Brigade.

== Units ==
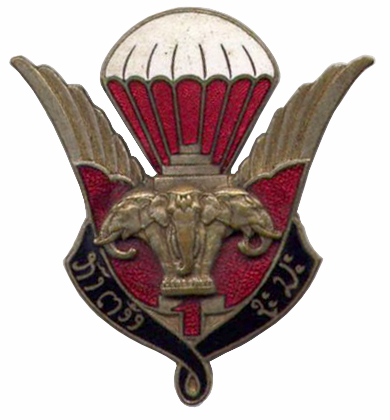
1st Laotian Parachute Battalion insignia, 1951–54.

- French Union Army and ANL airborne formations
  - 1st Laotian Para-Commando Company (1ére CCPL)
  - 1st Laotian Commando Company (1ére CCL)
  - 1st Laotian Parachute Battalion (1er BPL)
- Royalist para battalions
  - 1st parachute battalion (1er BP)
  - 2nd parachute battalion (2e BP)
  - 3rd parachute battalion (3e BP)
- Neutralist para battalions
  - 1st parachute battalion (1er BP)
  - 2nd parachute battalion (2e BP)
  - 3rd parachute battalion (3e BP)
  - 4th parachute battalion (4e BP)
  - 5th parachute battalion (5e BP)
- 12th parachute battalion (12e BP)
- Airborne Mobile Group 15 (GM 15)
  - 1st parachute battalion (1er BP)
  - 11th parachute battalion (11er BP)
  - 55th parachute battalion (55e BP)
- Airborne Mobile Group 21 (GM 21)
  - 33rd special battalion (BS 33)
  - 11th special battalion (BS 11)
  - 99th special battalion (BS 99)
- Airborne Mobile Group 802 (GM 802)
  - 2nd parachute battalion (2e BP)
  - 4th parachute battalion (4e BP)
  - 5th parachute battalion (5e BP)
- Mixed Mobile Group 801 (GM 801)
  - 85th parachute battalion (85e BP)
- 1st Special Commando Battalion (1er BCS)
- 104th parachute battalion (104e BP)
- 207th Commando Battalion (BC 207)
- 208th Commando Battalion (BC 208)
- 22nd Brigade (2nd Strike Division)
  - Headquarters & Headquarters Company
  - 101st parachute battalion (101er BP)
  - 102nd parachute battalion (102e BP)
  - 103rd parachute battalion (103e BP)
- 7th Para Brigade
  - Headquarters & Headquarters Company
  - 711th parachute battalion (711er BP)
  - 712nd parachute battalion (712e BP)
  - 713th parachute battalion (713e BP)
  - 714th parachute battalion (714e BP)

== Weapons and equipment ==
The Laotian airborne forces used the standard weaponry and equipment of French and U.S. origin issued to ANL and FAR units, complemented by captured Soviet or Chinese small-arms that allowed its personnel to use ammunition retrieved from enemy stocks while on operations. Paratrooper and para-commando companies also fielded crew-served heavy weapons, such as mortars and recoilless rifles.

- United States M1917 revolver
- United States Smith & Wesson Model 10 Revolver
- Germany Luger P08 pistol
- Germany Walther P38 pistol
- France Modèle 1935A pistol (7.65mm Longue)
- France MAS-35-S pistol (7.65mm Longue)
- United States Colt.45 M1911A1 Pistol
- United States Smith & Wesson Model 39 Pistol
- France MAT-49 Submachine gun
- United States M1A1 Thompson submachine gun
- United States M3A1 Grease Gun
- France MAS-49/56 Carbine
- United States M1A1 Carbine
- United States M2 Carbine
- United States M1 Garand rifle
- France MAS-49 rifle
- France MAS-36 CR39 folding-stock Bolt-action rifle
- China Type 56 assault rifle
- China Type 56-1 Assault rifle
- Soviet Union AK-47 Assault rifle
- Soviet Union AKM Assault rifle
- United States M16A1 Assault rifle
- United States CAR-15 Assault carbine
- France FM 24/29 light machine gun
- United States M1918A2 BAR Light machine gun
- United States M60 Light machine gun
- Soviet Union RPD Light machine gun
- China Type 56 Light machine gun
- United States Browning M1919A6 .30 Cal light machine gun
- United States Browning M1919A4 Medium machine gun
- United States Browning M2HB .50 Cal Heavy machine gun
- United States M20A1 3.5 inch Super Bazooka
- United States M72 LAW Anti-tank rocket launcher
- United States M79 grenade launcher
- United States M203 grenade launcher
- United States M19 mortar 60 mm
- United States M29 mortar 81 mm
- France Brandt Mle 1935 mortar 60 mm
- France Brandt Mle 27/31 mortar 81 mm
- United States M2 4.2 inch mortar 107 mm
- United States M20 recoilless rifle 75 mm
- United States M67 recoilless rifle 90 mm
- United States M18 Claymore anti-personnel mines

== See also ==
- 1967 Opium War
- Air America (airline)
- Commando Raider Teams
- Directorate of National Coordination
- Groupement de Commandos Mixtes Aéroportés (GCMA Laos)
- Laotian Civil War
- Lao People's Armed Forces
- List of weapons of the Laotian Civil War
- Military Regions of Laos
- Military Region 5 Commandos
- Pathet Lao
- Project Unity (Laos)
- Republic of Vietnam Airborne Division
- Royal Lao Armed Forces
- Royal Lao Army
- Royal Lao Police
- Royal Thai Police Aerial Reinforcement Unit (PARU)
- SPECOM
- Special Guerrilla Units (SGU)
- Vietnam War
