= 1st Laotian Parachute Battalion =

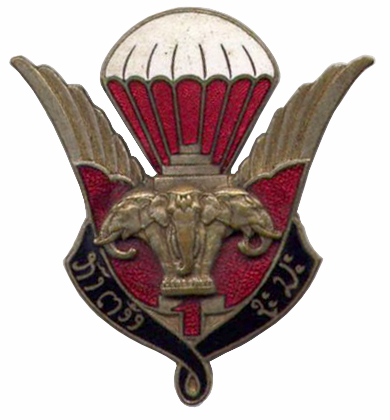
1st Laotian Parachute Battalion insignia, 1951–54.

The 1st Laotian Parachute Battalion or 1st BPL (French: 1er Bataillon de Parachutistes Laotiens – 1er BPL) was a Laotian airborne unit of the French Union Army, raised in Vientiane, French Indochina in the early 1950s. Led by French officers and Laotian non-commissioned officers (NCOs), the BPL fought in the First Indochina War and spearheaded all the French counter-insurgency operations launched against the Vietnamese Viet Minh guerrilla units operating in northeastern Laos.

== History ==
The 1st Laotian Parachute Battalion began forming in October 1951, and by 1 April 1952, the battalion was brought to strength with 853 officers and enlisted men, divided into a headquarters and three companies. Based at Camp Chinaimo, a major military facility located on the eastern outskirts of Vientiane, 1er BPL participated in twenty operations, six involving parachute jumps, during 1952. On 15–24 December, 576 members of the unit conducted a reinforcement drop into Sam Neua garrison during Operation "Noel". In February 1953, eighty additional battalion members parachuted into Sam Neua, allowing the BPL to form a fourth company. On 15 April 1953, the Viet Minh invaded northeastern Laos with 40,000 troops commanded by General Võ Nguyên Giáp and crushed the Sam Neua garrison, sending remnants of the BPL fleeing toward the Plain of Jars. A month later, the battalion was reconstituted at Chinaimo and conducted several reconnaissance and commando operations north of Luang Prabang, such as Operation "Dampieres" in September 1953, for the remainder of the year.

In March 1954, the BPL began preparing for Operation "Condor", the planned relief of the besieged Dien Bien Phu garrison in North Vietnam. During April and early May, the battalion advanced toward the Laotian-Vietnamese border, but was withdrawn in mid-May after the garrison fell. On 18 June, the BPL regrouped at Seno, a French military base located about 30 km (20 miles) east of Savannakhet. From 2–4 August, the battalion performed the last airborne operation of the First Indochina War, jumping into the town of Phanop in Khammouane province to link up with local militia units and sweep the territory up to the strategic Mụ Giạ Pass, located in the Annamite Range on the Laotian-Vietnamese border.

The fall of Dien Bien Phu brought the Indochina War to a close and drove the French government to enter into peace negotiations with the Viet Minh. Following the signing of the Agreement on the Cessation of Hostilities in Laos on 20 July 1954 and the implementation of the Indochina ceasefire on 6 August, the 981-strong BPL was brought back to Seno and turned over to the Laotian National Army (Armée Nationale Laotiènne – ANL). After French officers left the BPL in October, the name of the unit was simplified to 1st Parachute Battalion (1er Bataillon Parachutiste – 1er BP).

== See also ==
- Commando Raider Teams
- Directorate of National Coordination
- First Indochina War
- Groupement de Commandos Mixtes Aéroportés (GCMA Laos)
- Laotian Civil War
- List of weapons of the Laotian Civil War
- Republic of Vietnam Airborne Division
- Royal Lao Armed Forces
- Royal Lao Army
- Royal Lao Army Airborne
- SPECOM
- Vietnam War
- 1967 Opium War
