= Battle of Lak Sao =

1963–64 Laotian Civil War battle

- Part of Laotian Civil War
Date	November 1963 – January 1964
Location	Northern Laos
Result	Defeat of Royal Lao forces

Belligerents
(Laos) Royal Lao Armed Forces; Forces Armées Neutralistes	People's Army of Vietnam

Commanders and leaders
(Laos) Phoumi Nosavan	Unknown

The Battle of Lak Sao, fought between November 1963 and January 1964, was a major engagement of the Laotian Civil War. In November 1963, General Phoumi Nosavan, who held the reins of military power in the Kingdom of Laos, launched a military offensive against North Vietnamese invaders that cut across the northern panhandle of the nation. Although unsupported in this proxy action by his backers in the U.S. Embassy, he went ahead with his plan to push northwards from Nhommarath, then veer eastwards to the Vietnamese border. Phoumi's Central Intelligence Agency (CIA) advisors warned him that the North Vietnamese would retaliate, but he disregarded them.

The Royal Lao Army (RLA) reluctantly carried out its mission until it met with stiff resistance. At that point, they tended to flee rather than fight. As fighting occurred throughout December 1963, two elite RLA units, the 11th and 55th Parachute Battalions, were rendered ineffective by the communists, and by a faulty parachute drop. A battalion of volunteers was also dispersed by the People's Army of Vietnam (PAVN). The Royal Lao Armed Forces (FAR) ended the operation in early 1964, having lost control of the Nakay Plateau to the communists. This, following the Battle of Luang Namtha, resulted in two disastrous defeats in just two years for the Royal Lao Government (RLG).

== Background ==
The Kingdom of Laos emerged from the First Indochina War independent of the French, but in a state of chaos. Even as the French pulled out of Laos, the Americans took up their advisory role to the Royal Lao Government through such agencies as the Programs Evaluation Office (PEO). Meanwhile, North Vietnamese communists and Lao communists were active in Laos, sowing discontent against the government. The government itself was in turmoil, as various Laotian military leaders and politicians scrambled for positions of power. The American government became convinced that Laos could not be allowed to fall under communist control, lest other countries in Southeast Asia follow suit.

On 14 December 1960, General Phoumi Nosavan won control of the Kingdom of Laos in the Battle of Vientiane. Although he was backed by American covert operations, he did not want to await for a political solution to the political turmoil in Laos. In a move to assert control over Laotian territory, he authorized military operations in northwestern Laos near the Chinese, Burmese, and Vietnamese borders. In doing so, he hoped to force a military solution upon the unsettled political situation in Laos. However, his northwestern forces spectacularly lost the Battle of Luang Namtha, and he was forced to join a coalition government. In July 1962, the International Agreement on the Neutrality of Laos was signed, pledging that all foreign troops would exit Laos. The North Vietnamese government would not honor the treaty, however; they withdrew only a token contingent, leaving most of their invading troops inside Laos. In its aftermath, Phoumi would make another attempt at asserting RLG control in a communist-controlled area of Laos, at Lak Sao.

== The battle ==
In November 1963, the Royal Lao Army and the Forces Armées Neutralistes or FAN (Neutralist Armed Forces) decided to cooperate on a joint operation to cut across the upper Laotian panhandle, thus severing the attacking forces of the People's Army of Vietnam (PAVN) in two. The planned starting point was Nhommarath, where a joint RLA/FAN task force was assembled. After advancing northward up Route 8 to Lak Sao, the RLA/FAN forces would turn northeast towards the Nape Pass, an entry point to the Democratic Republic of Vietnam.

Although Phoumi and the RLG were heavily dependent on American military and logistical support, he did not pay heed to the American embassy's disapproval. The Americans judged the operation to be conducted too close to the Vietnamese border, and thus inviting retaliation from the PAVN. Nevertheless, the Laotians decided to go ahead anyway; General Sang Kittirath was placed in charge of the RLA/FAN task force. He committed the Neutralist Bataillon Infanterie 8 (Infantry Battalion 8), 5 Bataillon Parachutistes (5th Paratroop Battalion), and a Neutralist light tank company of PT-76s to the assault. By the end of November, the Royalist task force had occupied Lak Sao. At about the same time, Bataillon Regional 350 (Regional Battalion 350) occupied a westerly flanking position at Khamkeut.

The thrust from Lak Sao moved toward Nape Pass as planned in early December, rolling down a road freshly improved by the North Vietnamese, and brushed off a blocking attempt by a company of Pathet Lao guerrillas. This was a prelude to an aggressive resistance that began on 15 December, as the North Vietnamese committed a minimum of three battalions to confront the Laotian thrust. While sending one column down Route 8 to hit the Laotian task-force head-on, the North Vietnamese also circled around southwards through the Mu Gia Pass to strike towards Nhommarat. On 16 December, the RLA rushed the paratroopers of 11 Bataillon Parachutistes (11th Paratroop Battalion) aboard Royal Lao Air Force C-47 transports and dropped them into Khamkheut. By 19 December, the sky soldiers had worked their way over to Lak Sao and begun pushing up Route 8. At a one-lane steel bridge, the paratroopers were bloodied by PAVN forces and retreated. They passed back through friendly forces still holding at Nak Sao, and returned to their Khamkeut drop zone. When Khamkeut came under mortar fire from the PAVN pursuers, 11 BP evaded an additional 6 kilometres (3.7 mi) west to the Nam Theun riverbank.

The 55 Bataillon Parachutistes (55th Paratroop Battalion) was sent to the rescue. Its first attempt at a combat drop at Ban saw half of the battalion being blown off course over a ridge adjacent to the drop zone. After a second drop the following morning, the two paratroop battalions bypassed Khamkeut to relieve the garrison still holding their ground at Lak Sao. A confused withdrawal down Route 8 followed. Another reinforcing battalion, Bataillon Volontaires 34 (Volunteer Battalion 34) was also inserted into Khamkeut.

In the early days of January 1964, the Pathet Lao guerrillas and PAVN soldiers chased BV 34 from the field. BI 8, 5 BP, and the tank company took to the woods; they eventually regrouped at Thakhek. The two paratroop battalions, 55 BP and 11 BP, managed to coalesce at Phon Tiou, some 60 kilometres (37 mi) northwest. By the end of the month, the Nakay Plateau area was now in communist hands.

== Consequences ==
The combat performance of the RLA seemed as poor as it was at the disastrous Battle of Luang Namtha the previous year. This was the second military defeat suffered by the Laotian general running Laos, Phoumi Nosavan. As a result of combat losses, BP 11 was shipped under Program 007 to be retrained by the Royal Thai Army at Lopburi, Thailand. The Battle of Lak Sao also stripped the Royal Lao Army of a general reserve force.

== See also ==
- Air America (airline)
- Directorate of National Coordination
- Laotian Civil War
- Lao People's Armed Forces
- Pathet Lao
- Royal Lao Armed Forces
- Special Guerrilla Units (SGU)
- Vietnam War
- Weapons of the Laotian Civil War
