= Oudone Sananikone =

Laotian Army general

- Born: 1919; Vientiane
- Died: 1984 (aged 64–65); United States
- Military career
- Allegiance: Kingdom of Laos - Royal Lao Army
- Branch: Royal Lao Army
- Service years: 1950 to 1975
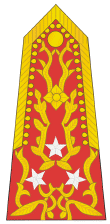
- Rank: Major general
- Commands: Chief of Staff of the Royal Lao Armed Forces, Military Region V (5)
- Conflicts: First Indochina War; Laotian Civil War
- Awards: Laos Medals: Order of the Reign of Sisavang Vong, Order of the Reign of Savang Vatthana, Combat Veteran's Medal, Order of Civil Merit, Medal of Government Gratitude, Franco-Laotian Resistance Medal France: Indochina Campaign Commemorative Medal, France Colonial Medal Indochine
- Other work: (RLG) Royal Lao Government, Former Director General of the Laotian Defense Ministry

Major general Oudone Sananikone (Ûdon Xananikôn), was a Laotian senior officer of the Royal Lao Army (French: Armée Royale du Laos – ARL), the land component of the Royal Lao Armed Forces (French: Forces Armées du Royaume – FAR), the official military of the Kingdom of Laos from 1950 to 1975.

== Life and career ==
A member of the aristocratic Sananikone family, he was born in 1919 in Vientiane. In 1945, he joined the Lao Issara movement. Returning to Vientane in 1950, he joined the Lao National Army. He supported General Phoumi Nosavan's 1960 coup. In 1969, Sananikone was promoted to the rank of Major general. He fled Laos in May 1975, shortly before the communist takeover. He settled in the United States, where he died in 1984.

== See also ==
- Brigadier general Thao Ty
- Laotian Civil War
- Major general Ouane Rattikone
- Major general Phoumi Nosavan
- Royal Lao Armed Forces
- Royal Lao Army
