= BS33 =

BS33 may refer to:

- BS 33 Carbon Filament Electric Lamps, a British Standard
- BS-33 Marta Mata, a Spanish Maritime Safety and Rescue Society tugboat
- BS 33, a Royal Lao Army Airborne Border Police Special Battalion
