= Military Region 5 Commandos =

- Commandos de la Région Militaire 5
- Active: 1969 - May 1975
- Country: Kingdom of Laos
- Allegiance: Royal Lao Government
- Branch: Royal Lao Army
- Type: Special operations forces
- Size: 340 men (at height)
- Part of: Royal Lao Armed Forces
- Headquarters: Ban Y Lai, near Vientiane
- Nickname: MR 5 Cdos.
- Engagements: Battle of Phou Khout; Battle of Khong Sedone

Commanders
- Notable commanders: (unknown)

The Military Region 5 Commandos (French: Commandos de la Région Militaire 5), MR 5 Commandos or MR 5 Cdos for short, were an elite military unit and Special Operations force of the Royal Lao Armed Forces (commonly known by its French acronym FAR), which operated during the final phase of the Laotian Civil War from 1969 to 1975.

== Origins ==
In 1969 some 300 selected Laotian personnel from the Royal Lao Army (RLA) were sent to Thailand to attend advanced Airborne and Ranger courses taught by instructors from the Royal Thai Army Special Forces (RTSF) at their Special Warfare Centre and Recondo School co-located at Fort Narai in Lopburi Province. Upon returning to Laos after completing their training, they went to provide the core of a new Para-Commando battalion which was assigned to Military Region 5, hence became known as "Military Region 5 Commandos".

== Structure and organization ==
By January 1970, MR 5 Cdos strength peaked at 340 officers and enlisted men, all airborne-qualified volunteers, organized into a battalion comprising one headquarters (HQ), three company HQ sections, and three Commando companies. The unit was based in Ban Y Lai, north of Vientiane, Laos capital city.

== Operational history 1969-1975 ==
The MR 5 Cdos were initially employed primarily on counter-insurgency sweeps targeting Pathet Lao guerrilla units around Vientiane, though in later years they were deployed in other military regions to demonstrate symbolic support from the Royal Lao Government. During September 1971 one company participated in Operation Golden Mountain, the successful capture of Phou Khout Mountain, overlooking Muang Soui in Military Region 2 (Long Tieng), and in 1972 two companies were sent to Military Region 4 (Pakse) to assist RLA units in the recapture of Khong Sedone. As late as May 1975, after the collapse of the FAR, a single remaining company from the MR 5 Cdos was fighting Pathet Lao forces north of the Laotian capital city.

== See also ==
- Air America (airline)
- Commando Raider Teams
- Directorate of National Coordination
- Laotian Civil War
- Lao People's Armed Forces
- Pathet Lao
- Royal Lao Armed Forces
- Royal Lao Army Airborne
- Special Guerrilla Units (SGU)
- SPECOM
- Vietnam War
- Weapons of the Laotian Civil War
