= SPECOM =

Former Laotian commando unit

Special Commando
- Commando Speciale
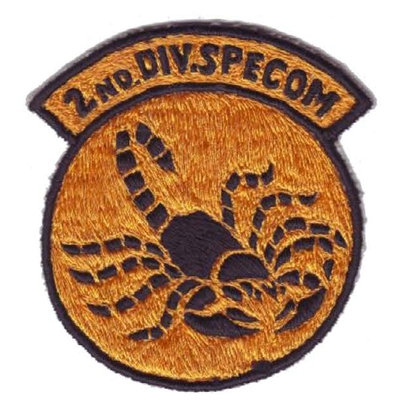
- SPECOM unit patch 1972–1975
- Active: 1972 – May 1975
- Country: Kingdom of Laos
- Allegiance: Royal Lao Government
- Branch: Royal Lao Army
- Type: Special forces, Commando
- Size: 412 men (at height)
- Part of: Royal Lao Armed Forces
- Headquarters: Seno, near Savannakhet
- Nicknames: Special Commando (SPECOM), CCS in French
- Engagements: Laotian Civil War; Battle of Thakhek

Commanders
- Notable commanders: Thao Ty; Oroth Insisiengmay

SPECOM was the English acronym for Special Commando or Commando Speciale in French, the main Special forces/para-commando unit of the Royal Lao Armed Forces (commonly known by its French acronym FAR), which operated during the final phase of the Laotian Civil War from 1972 to 1975.

== Origins ==
In late 1971 construction began on a training centre at Seno, near Savannakhet in the Third Military Region (MR 3), to provide Commando instruction for the Royal Lao Army (RLA) newly formed 2nd Strike Division (2éme Division d'infanterie d'Intervention). The training cadre, consisting of several Laotian graduates of the U.S. Special Forces (USSF) course at Fort Bragg, North Carolina, in the United States, were converted into the core of an elite Special Commando Company (French: Compagnie Commando Speciale – CCS) or SPECOM for short. The new unit was actually the brainchild of Brigadier general Thao Ty, the commanding officer of the 2nd Strike Division and reported directly to him.

Put in charge of creating the new formation was Captain Oroth Insisiengmay, a Fort Bragg and Fort Benning graduate who had earlier been a member of the Combat Arms Training Centre (CATC) training staff at Phou Khao Khouay military base. Assisting Oroth was Lieutenant Khammouang Santy, one of three FAR students who had recently completed Jungle warfare, weapons, and Commando courses in Australia. Together, Oroth and Khammouang solicited volunteers from the RLA. The 21st Brigade donated a full company – of its worst troops. Building on this dubious foundation, a set of M60 machine guns was obtained from CIA irregular troops in trade and M72 LAW Anti-tank rocket launchers were siphoned off from Phou Khao Khouay. In addition, a sympathetic Deputy Chief (DepChief) of the Joint US Military Assistance Group Thailand, ultimately diverted Jungle boots, rucksacks, and some early-model XM148 grenade launchers fixed under M16 rifles. Thao Ly even donated to the group a pair of Willys M38A1 MD jeeps, which were emblazoned with divisional insignia and fitted with pintle-mounted M60 machine guns at the back.

By mid-1972 SPECOM had expanded from a single understrength company to two airborne reconnaissance (recon) companies; a third was raised in mid-1973 when 140 former para-commandos were transferred from the Savannakhet-based irregular Commando Raider Teams (CRTs) and a heavy weapons company was added, bringing the unit to battalion strength. Captain Oroth held the overall command of the new unit, whilst Lt. Khammouang was encharged of its Headquarters' Company.

== Structure and organization ==
By early 1974, SPECOM strength reached 412 officers and enlisted men, all airborne qualified volunteers, organized into a reinforced battalion comprising one headquarters (HQ), four company HQ sections, three recon companies – 1st, 2nd, and 3rd, each broken into 12-men teams – and a heavy weapons company (4th). Commanded by Captain (later, Major) Oroth Insisiengmay, the unit was headquartered in Seno, near Savannakhet and was subordinated to the 2nd Strike Division until the latter formation's disbandment in April of that same year, when the former was transferred to the RLA Airborne Forces command.

== Operational history 1972–1975 ==
The missions performed by SPECOM during its brief existence were varied, ranging from crash site recovery, long range strategic and tactical reconnaissance to deep penetration raids, and support riot control duties.

The first true combat assignment of the SPECOM occurred in late 1972, when they were used to secure a H-34 helicopter crash site north-east of Seno. In the opening months of 1973, SPECOM recon teams were sent to Thakhek to bolster its defences when North Vietnamese Army (NVA) units began pressuring the city. By mid-year elements of the unit were heli-lifted again north-east of Seno to place a listening station near the Ho Chi Minh trail, the main NVA supply route extended through Laos. A planned SPECOM assault into the national capital Vientiane after a group of renegade Royal Lao Air Force (RLAF) officers led by former Brigadier general Thao Ma captured Wattay Airbase in August was cancelled when their coup attempt quickly fell apart. In April 1974 SPECOM's 2nd recon company was moved to Vientiane to provide VIP security to rightist members of the new coalition government.

=== Disbandement ===
In May 1974 the FAR High Command dissolved the ineffective 2nd Strike Division and elements of its three understrength brigades were reorganized into three new parachute battalions (Bataillons de Parachutistes – BP), the 711er, 712e, and 713e BPs grouped into the RLA's 7th Para Brigade raised at Seno under the command of Colonel Bounthavy Phousangiem. SPECOM was then converted into the brigade's fourth parachute battalion, 714e BP. Elements of 714e BP were deployed in early 1975 to Thakhek to reinforce local Royal Lao Police (PRL) and RLA infantry units in an unsuccessful attempt to quell pro-communist demonstrations. The 7th Para Brigade was disbanded after Pathet Lao guerrilla forces took control of Vientiane on 23 August 1975.

== Weapons and equipment ==
The SPECOM used the standard weaponry and equipment of US origin issued to FAR units, complemented by captured Soviet or Chinese small-arms such as AK-47 assault rifles that allowed its personnel to use ammunition retrieved from enemy caches while on operations. The unit also fielded crew-served heavy weapons, such as mortars and recoilless rifles.

- United States Smith & Wesson Model 10 Revolver
- United States Colt.45 M1911A1 Pistol
- United States Smith & Wesson Model 39 Pistol
- Soviet Union TT-33 Pistol
- China Type 56 assault rifle
- China Type 56–1 Assault rifle
- Soviet Union AK-47 Assault rifle
- Soviet Union AKM Assault rifle
- United States M16A1 Assault rifle
- United States CAR-15 Assault carbine
- Soviet Union RPD Light machine gun
- China Type 56 Light machine gun
- United States M1918A2 BAR Light machine gun
- United States M60 Light machine gun
- United States M72 LAW Anti-tank rocket launcher
- United States M79 grenade launcher
- United States XM148 grenade launcher
- United States M203 grenade launcher
- United States Browning M1919A6 .30 Cal light machine gun
- United States Browning M1919A4 .30 Cal Medium machine gun
- United States Browning M2HB .50 Cal Heavy machine gun
- United States M2 4.2 inch mortar 107 mm
- United States M67 recoilless rifle 90 mm
- United States M18 Claymore anti-personnel mines

=== Vehicles ===
- United States Willys M38A1 MD ¼-ton (4×4) jeep: two in service with SPECOM.

== See also ==
- Army of the Republic of Vietnam Special Forces (LLDB)
- Air America (airline)
- Commando Raider Teams
- Directorate of National Coordination
- Laotian Civil War
- Lao People's Armed Forces
- List of weapons of the Laotian Civil War
- Khmer Special Forces
- Military Region 5 Commandos
- Pathet Lao
- Project Unity (Laos)
- Royal Lao Armed Forces
- Royal Lao Army Airborne
- Royal Lao Police
- Special Guerrilla Units (SGU)
- Vietnam War
