= Royal Lao Army =

Armed Force of the Kingdom of Laos (1949–1975)

- Armée royale du Laos ກອງທັພພຣະຣາຊອານາຈັກລາວ
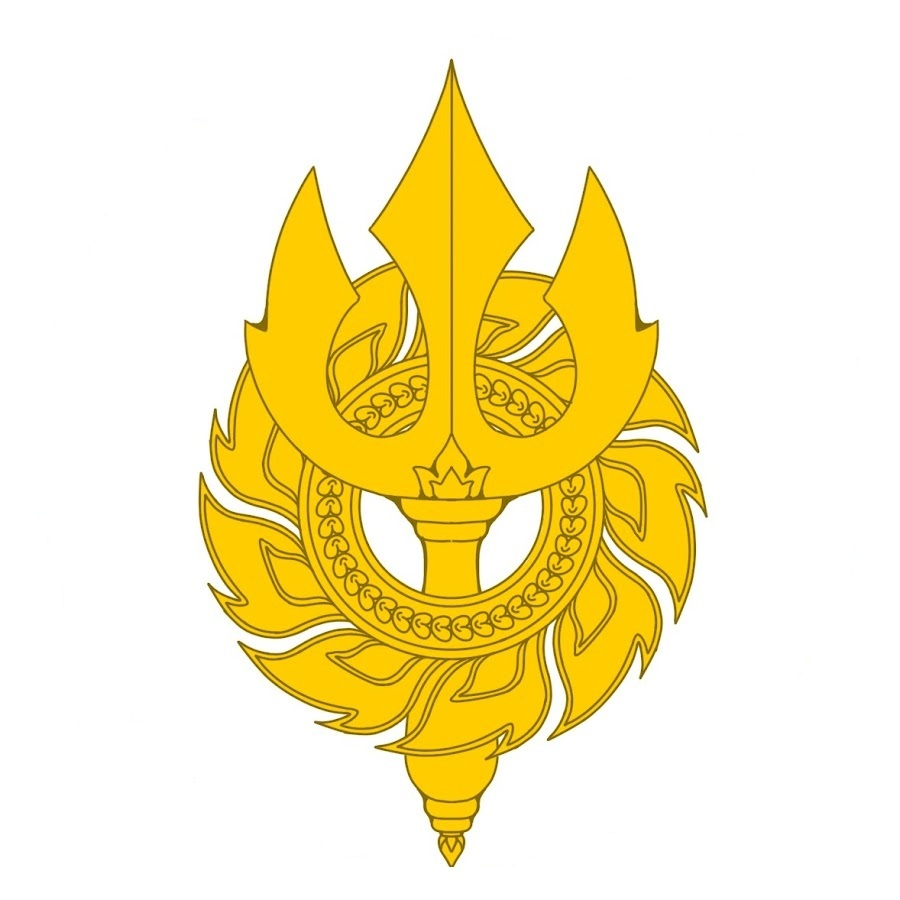
- Emblem of the Royal Lao Army (1961–1975)
- Active: 1 July 1949 – 2 December 1975
- Country: Kingdom of Laos
- Allegiance: Royal Lao Government; HM The King of Laos
- Type: Army
- Role: Land warfare
- Size: 35,000 men (at height)
- Part of: Royal Lao Armed Forces
- Garrison/HQ: Phone Kheng (Vientiane)
- Nickname: RLA (ARL in French)
- Mottos: "Peace, Independence, Democracy, Unity and Prosperity".
- Colours: Red and Gold: Red and gold were prominent colors in the Royal Lao Army's uniform and insignia, particularly seen in the officers' shoulder boards.
- Anniversaries: 1 July – RLA Day
- Engagements: First Indochina War; Laotian Civil War; Vietnam War

Commanders
- Notable commanders: Sounthone Pathammavong; Phoumi Nosavan; Ouane Rattikone; Kouprasith Abhay; Oudone Sananikone; Vang Pao; Soutchay Vongsavanh; Thonglith Chokbengboun

Insignia
- Flag of the Royal Lao Army (1952–1975)

The Royal Lao Army (Lao: ກອງທັພພຣະຣາຊອານາຈັກລາວ; French: Armée royale du Laos – ARL), also designated by its anglicized title RLA, was the land component of the Royal Lao Armed Forces (FAR), the official military of the Kingdom of Laos during the North Vietnamese invasion of Laos and the Laotian Civil War between 1960 and 1975.

== History ==
The ARL traced back its origins to World War II, when the first entirely Laotian military unit, the 1st Laotian Rifle Battalion (French: 1ér Bataillon de Chasseurs Laotiens – BCL), was raised early in June 1941 by the Vichy French colonial authorities. Intended to be used on internal security operations to bolster the local sections of the mainly Vietnamese Indochinese Guard (French: Garde Indochinoise), the 1st BCL did not see much action until after March 9, 1945, when the Japanese Imperial Army forcibly seized control of French Indochina from France, including Laos. The battalion then retreated into the mountains, where they linked with the Laotian irregular guerrilla fighters (French: Maquis) operating there. These guerrillas were supplied, trained, and led by teams of Free French agents who had been trained in special jungle warfare by the Force 136 unit of the British Special Operations Executive (SOE) in India and were subsequently parachuted into Indochina in December 1944 with the aim of creating a local anti-Japanese resistance network. The then Laotian Crown Prince Savang Vatthana called upon all Laotians to oppose the Japanese and assist the Free French, and many risked their lives to supply and inform the French-led resistance. Thanks to the support of these Laotian partisans, five resistance groups (divided into 26 subgroups comprising some 200 French agents and 300 Laotian 'Maquisards') held out during the six-month Japanese occupation, supplied in part with air drops by British Royal Air Force aircraft flying out of Calcutta in India.

Under the command of their Free French cadres, the Laotian soldiers from the 1st BCL engaged in guerrilla actions alongside the irregular 'Maquisards' against the Japanese occupation forces in Laos until Japan's surrender on August 15, 1945. In November of that same year, the various Laotian guerrilla groups were consolidated into four regular light infantry battalions and, together with the 1st BCL, integrated into the newly founded French Union Army.

Meanwhile, confronted in early May 1945 with the Allied Powers' victory over Nazi Germany and sensing their own imminent defeat, the Japanese military authorities in Laos began stirring up local anti-French nationalistic sentiments. On 12 October of that year, a group of Laotian nationalists led by Prince Phetsarath Ratanavongsa deposed King Sisavang Vong, proclaimed the independence of Laos and announced the formation of a new government body, the Committee for Independent Laos (Lao: ຄະນະ ກຳ ມາທິການເພື່ອປະເທດລາວອິດສະຫຼະ, romanized: Khana kam mathikan pheu pathedlav idsara) or Khana Lao Issara and Lao Issara for short, which was based in Vientiane. Taking advantage of the temporary absence of French authority in the country's main cities, the Lao Issara promptly established a police force, the Civil Guard (Lao: ກອງພົນລະເຮືອນ, romanized: kong phonla heuon) and an armed defense force, the Army for the Liberation and Defense of Laos or ALDL (Lao: ກອງທັບປົດປ່ອຍ ແລະ ປ້ອງກັນຊາດລາວ, romanized: kongthabpodpony lae pongkansad lav), to exercise its authority with the support of Ho Chi Minh's Viet Minh Hanoi-based government in the Tonkin and the Nationalist Chinese. The Lao Issara's ALDL was essentially a lightly armed and poorly trained militia, provided with a mixed assortment of small-arms captured from the Japanese, looted from French colonial depots, or sold by the Chinese Nationalist Army troops who occupied northern Laos under the terms of the 1945 Potsdam Conference.

=== The Laotian National Army 1946–1955 ===
By early March 1946, the French Union Army aligned some 4,000 Laotian troops organized into five light infantry battalions (Bataillons de Chasseurs Laotiens) – the 1er, 2e, 3e, 4e, 5e, and 6e BCLs – led by a cadre of French officers and senior non-commissioned officers (NCOs), which participated actively in the French reoccupation of Laos by sweeping the Bolovens Plateau. On 21 March, the Laotian battalions provided infantry support to French Far East Expeditionary Corps (CEFEO) airborne, armoured car and artillery units fighting Lao Issara ALDL troops under Prince Souphanouvong at the Battle of Thakhek in Khammouane Province, in which the latter lost approximately 700 men and 300 civilians were killed, leaving behind 250 dead and 150 prisoners before being forced to withdraw. On 24 April, the Laotian battalions had assisted the French in the recapture of Vientiane without facing any significant resistance, followed on 9 May by Luang Prabang, which forced the Lao Issara leadership to flee to exile in Thailand in September 1946. Upon the successful conclusion of the campaign, the Laotian battalions continued with small counter-insurgency operations against remnant bands of Lao Issara ALDL insurgents over the next three years, assuming responsibility for internal security duties in the areas located along the Thai border. In May 1946, the French established the Lao National Guard (French: Garde Nationale Laotiènne – GNL), a paramilitary Gendarmerie with a paper strength of 1,250 men, which was to be exclusively composed by Laotian nationals. Although the new GNL was technically subordinated to the Laotian ministry of the interior and placed in 1947 under the nominal command of King Sisavang Vong, it was kept under the close supervision of French gendarmes from the Republican Guard units stationed in Indochina.

However, faced with the potential threat posed by the growing Viet Minh insurgency in neighbouring Vietnam, the French instituted on July 1, 1949, a separated Laotian National Army (Armée Nationale Laotiènne – ANL) of the French Union to defend Laos following the signing of the Franco–Lao General Convention that same year. Its formation actually began earlier in 1947, with the creation of the Land Forces of Laos (Forces Terrestres du Laos – FTL), an informal gathering of several indigenous irregular auxiliary units made of ex-Lao Issara ALDL guerrillas raised early by the French to reinforce their regular CEFEO units alongside the regular BCLs, whose strength had increased from five to eight by July 1949.

The process of formation of the new Laotian army started on March 23, 1950, when its first regular units were raised, consisting of 17 Laotian Infantry Companies (Compagnies d'Infanterie Laotiènne – CIL), subsequently grouped into two Laotian Infantry Battalions (Bataillons d'Infanterie Laotiènne – BIL) officered by the French. The 1er BIL was created in Vientiane on July 1950, followed by the 2e BIL in Pakse on October that year. By April 1951, out of a planned strength of 4,000 men, the ANL had only 1,728 troops but nevertheless continued its expansion with the creation on August 22, 1951, of the 3e BIL and 4e BIL by bringing together several CILs. On October 1951, an airborne unit, the 1st Laotian Parachute Battalion (1er Bataillon de Parachutistes Laotiens – 1er BPL), began to be formed and trained by the French. The ANL ended the year with a strength of 5,091 officers and enlisted men, though it was plagued by lack of Laotian leadership, and its weaponry was a hodgepodge. To alleviate the leadership problem, the French began training Laotian officers and non-commissioned officers – in 1949 the first group of four Laotian officer student candidates (Aspirants) had been sent to the French-run Khmer Military Academy (École Militaire Khmère) in Phnom Penh, Cambodia to attend the three-year officer course – even as they continued to lead and train the new army. The expansion of the ANL accelerated throughout 1952, reaching by January 1, 1953, a strength of 13,420 officers and enlisted men, and on July 1, 1954, the 1er, 2e, 4e, 5e, 7e and 8e BCLs became the 12e, 9e, 10e, 7e and 8e Laotian Infantry Battalions; these were subsequently integrated with the FTL irregulars on July 16 into the new Laotian army, whose strength rose to 23,000–25,000 men.

=== Post-war developments 1955–1960 ===
In July 1959, the ANL, the Laotian Navy, and the Laotian Aviation were gathered into the newly created Laotian Armed Forces (Forces Armées Laotiènnes – FAL), renamed Royal Lao Armed Forces (Forces Armées du Royaume – FAR) in September 1961.

== Structure ==
The chain of command of the Royal Lao Army was placed under the Ministry of Defense in Vientiane. The country was divided into five military districts termed Military Regions (MR), roughly corresponding to the areas of the country's 13 provinces. The Military Regions were the basis of the warlordism culture that affected the RLA and the FAR High Command, with most of the MR Commanders running their zones like private fiefdoms.

To meet the threat represented by the Pathet Lao insurgency, the Royal Lao Army depended on a small French military training mission (Mission Militaire Française près du Gouvernment Royale du Laos or MMF-GRL), headed by a general officer, an exceptional arrangement permitted under the 1955 Geneva Accords, as well as covert assistance from the United States in the form of the Programs Evaluation Office (PEO), established on 15 December 1955, replaced in 1961 by the Military Assistance Advisory Group (Laos). Military organization and tactical training reflected French traditions. Most of the equipment was of U.S. origin, however, because early in the First Indochina War, the Americans had been supplying the French with matériel ranging from guns to aircraft. Between 1962 and 1971, the U.S. provided Laos with direct military assistance, but not including the cost of equipping and training irregular and paramilitary forces by the Central Intelligence Agency (CIA). By the time the PEO changed into the Requirements Office in September 1962, the PEO believed "...the Laotian army continued to distinguish itself primarily by its lassitude and incompetence." PEO also noted that CIA-trained Hmong guerrillas were the only troops fighting to preserve northeastern Laos. When the PEO brought in Operation White Star trainers, the instructors found that 19 out of 20 Laotian soldiers had fewer than three years of education.

=== Field organization 1959–1970 ===
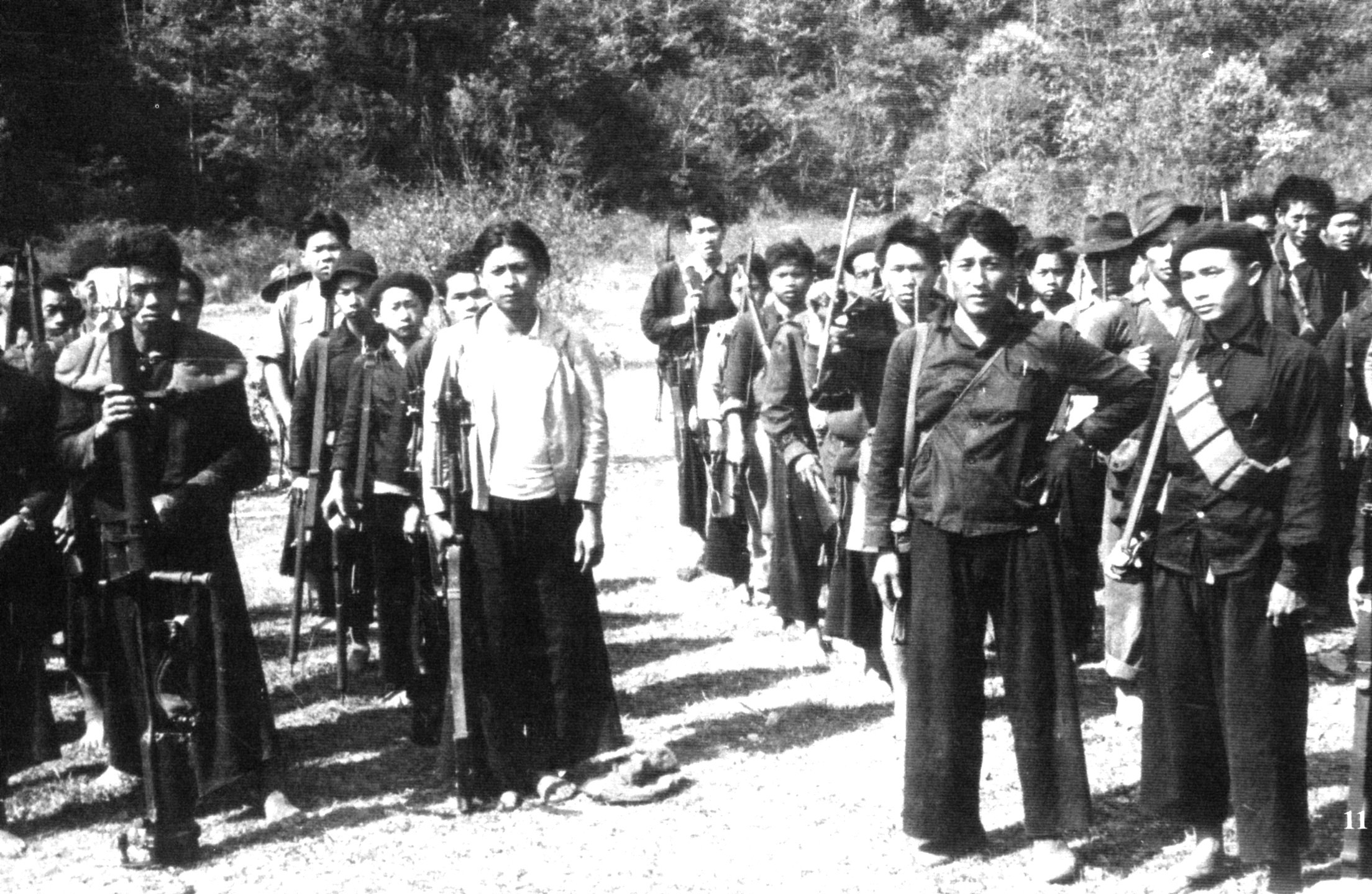
An Auto Defense de Choc (ADC) Hmong guerrilla company assembles at Phou Vieng, Spring 1961

Laotian National Army strength in May 1959 peaked at 29,000 officers and enlisted men organized into twelve independent battalions – ten infantry (Bataillons d'Infanterie) and two airborne (Bataillons de Parachutistes – BP) – plus one armored regiment and a field artillery group (1ér Groupe d'Artillerie). A Laotian regular infantry battalion was organized according to the French Army model into a battalion headquarters (HQ), three company HQs and three rifle companies. Long-standing major formations above battalion level, such as Regiments, Half-brigades (Demi-brigades), Brigades or even Divisions, were virtually nonexistent at the time. Instead, from November 1960 infantry and Paratrooper battalions began to be brought together to form loosely organized "mobile groups" (Groupements mobiles – GMs) or "Mobiles" for short, a tactical expedient inherited from the French who had employed it previously during the First Indochina War. Being essentially a regimental-sized combat task-force, a typical Laotian GM consisted of two or three battalions' assembled for specific operations. Originally raised on a temporary basis, the Mobile Groups were re-structured in April 1961 as permanent units by the then defense minister and strongman of Laos, Major general Phoumi Nosavan, and to oversee the newly created GMs, he created the Ground Forces Command and appointed General Sang Kittirath as its Chief. By July 1962 the Laotian Army fielded nine such Groups, eight composed of regular units – GMs 12, 13, 14, 15 (Airborne), 16, 17, and 18 – and one of irregular guerrilla forces – GM B –, with two or more being allocated per each Military Region (MR). Although the post of Chief of the Ground Forces Command was abolished in January 1965, which forced General Sang Kittirah to resign, by late 1966 the number of mobile groups had increased to twelve, with the addition of the airborne GMs 21 and 802, and the mixed GM 801. In practice, the Military Region's commanders used the GMs as their private armies to further their own interests, rarely dispatching them outside the Mekong river valley. The Mobile Groups' structure was retained until August 1968, when all GMs in the Laotian ground forces were abolished – the GMs 801 and 802 were not disbanded until the following year – and replaced by independent battalions.

The regular units were supplemented by eighteen Regional Battalions (Bataillons Regionales), eighteen Volunteer Battalions (Bataillons de Voluntaires), and 247 irregular Commando Self-Defense village militia companies (Auto Defense de Choc – ADC). However, in November 1965 the Volunteer Battalions were disbanded and merged with the Regional Battalions, whilst the rural ADC militia companies were grouped with the irregular GM B to form the CIA-sponsored Special Guerrilla Units (SGUs). Renamed the Royal Lao Army in September 1961, the new RLA remained essentially a light infantry force devoted primarily to static defense and internal security rather than national defense; most units were kept stationed near the main population centers (including Vientiane and the provincial capitals) guarding vital facilities such as depots, airfields, and lines of communication. As with its ANL predecessor, the RLA was capable only of limited offensive and counter-insurgency operations, and consequently its conventional military value was very low.

The earlier ANL support units, such as the Military police (Prevôtée Militaire or Police Militaire – PM), Medical (Serviçe de Santé), Quartermaster (Service de Intendance), Engineer (Génie), Geographic services (Service Géographique), Signals (Transmissions), Transport (Train), and Maintenance (Réparation du Matériel – RM) were also organized into independent battalions or companies. Later in the 1960s, the RLA technical branch services were re-organized and expanded to corps' strength, in order to include Finance (Finances), Military logistics (Service de Matériel), Ordnance (Munitions), Military Fuel/Petrol, Oil and Lubricants – POL (Service de Essence), Military justice (Justice Militaire), Psychological warfare (Guerre Psychologique) and Military intelligence (Renseignement Militaire), all placed under the responsibility of the Service Directorates subordinated to the Ministry of National Defense. A uniformed female auxiliary service, the Royal Laotian Women's Army Corps – RLWAC (Corps Feminine de l'Armée Royale du Laos – CFARL), was established in the early 1960s, whose members served in the RLA on administrative, staff, communications, political warfare, medical and other non-combatant duties.

=== Re-organization 1971–73 ===
Following the Nam Bac débâcle, the demoralized Royal Lao Army reverted to its earlier static defense role of the main population centres along the Mekong river, relinquishing all offensive operations to the Paratrooper battalions, Commando units, the irregular ethnic SGUs, the Project "Unity" Thai volunteer battalions and the Royal Lao Air Force (RLAF). This move however, placed an additional burden on these already overstretched elite formations that formed the core of the Royal Lao military forces and actually did most of the fighting. By December 1968, total Royal Lao Army strength stood at 45,000 troops on paper, but is estimated that the actual number was no less than 30,000–35,000, with its combat elements organized solely into fifty-eight independent light infantry battalions, one armoured regiment comprising three recce squadrons (1st Recce Squadron at Luang Prabang, 2nd Recce Squadron at Vientiane, and 4th Recce Squadron at Pakse) and one tank squadron (3rd Tank Squadron), and a single artillery regiment consisting of four artillery battalions.

In late August 1971, with the Vietnamisation process in full swing in South Vietnam, a similar effort was attempted towards making the RLA a more effective, self-sufficient force. Following a U.S. Army system of organization, the regular infantry battalions were consolidated into two light infantry divisions, formally created on March 23, 1972, and locally designated as "Strike Divisions" (Divisions d'infanterie d'Intervention). Both divisions would be directly subordinated to the FAR High Command in Phone Kheng and not to any single MR commander. Based at Luang Prabang, the 1st Strike Division (1ér Division d'infanterie d'Intervention) commanded by Brigadier general Bounchanh Savathphayphane, was tasked with operations in northern Laos whilst the 2nd Strike Division (2éme Division d'infanterie d'Intervention), commanded by Brig. Gen. Thao Ty and based at Seno near Savannakhet, was oriented towards the south.

On February 21, 1973, the long-awaited protocols to the Agreement on the Restoration of Peace and Reconciliation in Laos were signed in Vientiane, opening the way for the Royal Lao Government and the Pathet Lao leadership to iron out the final mechanics of a coalition government. The next day a ceasefire came to effect throughout Laos and with the exception of some minor skirmishes, it was generally observed by both sides. As stipulated by the terms of this agreement, the old ethnic SGU guerrilla forces were scheduled for integration into the RLA. However, most guerrillas – in particular those from the Hmong hill tribes – felt unwelcome in the regular army, still dominated as it was by the Lowland Lao, who remained deeply suspicious of the other non-Lao ethnic groups. In addition, the decreasing in pay and other privileges sharply dulled the cutting edge of what had been an effective fighting force, and left them incapable of halting the takeover of the country by the Pathet Lao.

Later on 1 August that year, the ongoing negotiations between the Royal Lao Government and the Pathet Lao led to a tentative agreement for the neutralisation of the cities of Luang Prabang and Vientiane. To accomplish this, the RLA and the Pathet Lao would each be allowed to station one infantry battalion and 1,000 police in Vientiane and two infantry companies and 500 police in the national capital. However, before either city was neutralised, Brigadier general Thao Ma, the former RLAF commander who had been living in exile in Thailand since his earlier coup attempt in October 1966, staged on 20 August another coup d'état by crossing the Mekong with a group of 60 dissident Lao pilots and seized control of Wattay Airbase. Although Thao Ma's coup attempt was crushed by loyalist troops of the RLA under the command of Major general Kouprasith Abhay, it proved to be the last gasp of the rightists. The failed coup also spelled the premature end to the RLA's 1st and 2nd Strike Divisions, which were regarded as ineffective: the headquarters for both divisions and the six brigades were quietly dissolved, and their subordinate battalions were returned to the control of the MR commanders.

=== Late War organization 1974–75 ===
By May 1974 a thinning of RLA ranks forced the FAR High Command to replace the two strike divisions disbanded the previous year by a series of smaller, understrength brigades. In the Military Region 2 (MR 2), the War had taken a heavy toll on Major general Vang Pao's guerrilla army, whose strength declined from 19,000 to 23,000 Hmong troops organized in dozens of CIA-backed irregular SGU and RLA battalions to a mere fourteen battalions comprising just 5,000–5,500 Hmong guerrillas. To compensate the severe manpower shortages and provide Vang Pao with a regional manoeuvre force, four battalions out of this total were regrouped into a new 2nd Infantry Brigade (2de Brigade de Infanterie) headquartered at Long Tieng and placed under the command of Colonel Moua Sue.

Similar drastic troop cuts took place in the Military Region 3 (MR 3), where three consolidated battalions were grouped into a new 3rd Infantry Brigade (3éme Brigade de Infanterie) headquartered at Nong Saphong led by Colonel Praseurth Mounsourysak, a former commander of the 31st Volunteer Battalion or BV 31 (Bataillon de Voluntaires 31) from Dong Hene. This brigade kept one battalion at the Moung Phalane front, with the other two battalions being deployed on the Thakhek sector.

In the Military Region 4 (MR 4), the local ex-CIA troops were consolidated into three battalions and regrouped into a new 4th Infantry Brigade (4éme Brigade de Infanterie) headquartered at the intersection of Route 13 with Route 23, placed under the command of Lieutenant colonel Khamphat Boua, previously the commander of the PS 18 camp. Of its three battalions, two took turns rotating to the Military Region 5 (MR 5) to counter the Pathet Lao presence in the capital.

Elements of the three understrength brigades of the defunct 2nd Strike Division were consolidated into three new parachute battalions, the 711er, 712e, and 713e BPs, grouped into the RLA's new 7th Para Brigade (7éme Brigade de Parachutistes) which began forming at Seno in the Military Region 3 (MR 3) under the command of Colonel Bounthavy Phousangiem. The first two, 711er and 712e BP, were a merger of three existing RLA airborne battalions, whist 713e BP, commanded by Major Khao Insisiengmay, consisted of former CIA Commando troops. A fourth parachute battalion was soon added when they absorbed SPECOM, a Special Forces' unit also part of the 2nd Strike Division, which became the 714e BP commanded by Major Oroth Insisiengmay.

== Combat history ==
The brigades structure was maintained until August 23, 1975, when the Pathet Lao entered Vientiane and on 2 December that year, they dissolved the FAR.

== Elite Forces ==
- Royal Lao Army Airborne
- Military Region 5 Commandos (MR 5 Cdos)
- SPECOM

== List of ANL and Royal Lao Army commanders ==
=== Chiefs-of-Staff and Commanders-in-Chief ===
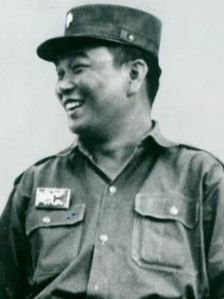
Major general Phoumi Nosavan, c.1960

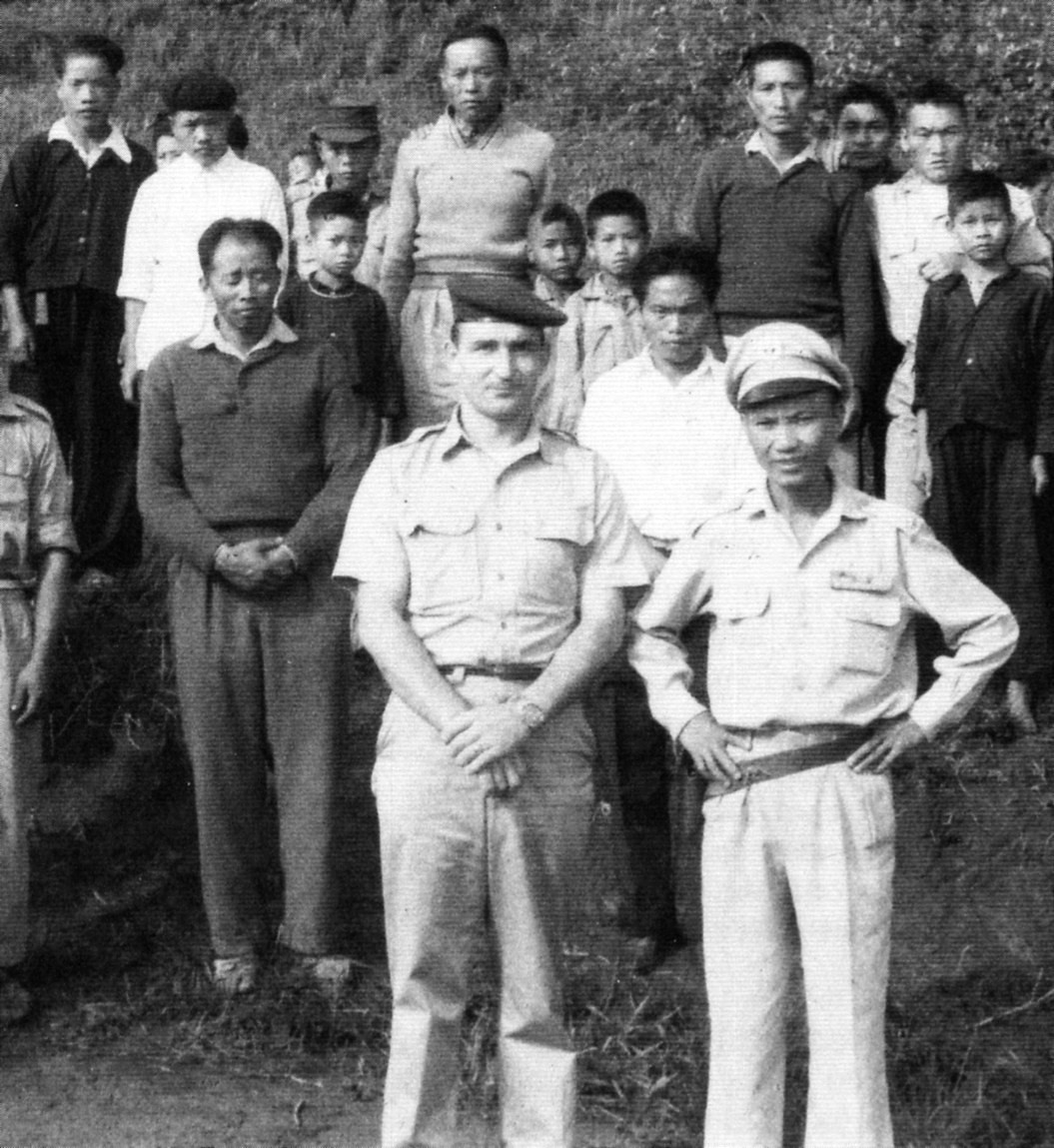
PEO adviser Jack F. Mathews with then Major Vang Pao, commander of the 10éme Bataillon de Infanterie (10 BI), at Nong Net, July 1960

- Colonel (later, General) Sounthone Pathammavong – first Chief-of-Staff and Commander-in-Chief of the Royal Lao Army (1950–1958) and later FAR Chief-of-Staff (1960–1972).
- Major general Phoumi Nosavan – Commander-in-Chief of the Royal Lao Army (1958–1965).
- Major general Ouane Rattikone – Commander-in-Chief of the Royal Lao Army (1965–1969).
- Major general Kouprasith Abhay – Deputy Commander-in-Chief of the Royal Lao Army (1973–1975).
- Major general Oudone Sananikone – Chief-of-Staff and later Deputy Commander-in-Chief of the Royal Lao Army (1969–1973)

=== Chief of the Ground Forces Command ===
- General Sang Kittirath (1961–1965)

=== Notable field commanders ===
- Major general Phasouk Somly Rasaphak
- Major general Khamta Simmanotham
- Major general Vang Pao
- Brigadier general Soutchay Vongsavanh
- Brigadier general Kham Ouane Boupha
- Brigadier general Thao Ty
- Brigadier general Tham Sayasitsena
- Brigadier General Bounleut Sanichanh
- Brigadier General Thao Pao Ly – Chief-of-Staff of Military Region 3 (MR 3)
- General Sengsouvanh Souvannarath
- General Amkha Soukhavong
- General Sing Rattanasamai
- Colonel Bounleuth Saycocie
- Colonel Saveng Vongsavath
- Colonel Ketsana Vongsouvanh
- Lieutenant colonel Ekarath Souvannarot
- Captain (later, Major general) Kong Le

== Weapons and equipment ==
Throughout its existence, the Royal Laotian Army received military assistance mainly from France and the United States, who provided since the late 1940s and mid-1950s respectively everything that the RLA used, from uniforms and boots to rifles, artillery and vehicles.

=== Small-arms ===
During the First Indochina War the Laotian National Army (ANL) weaponry was a hodgepodge, with most of its poorly trained units equipped in a haphazard way with an array of French, American, Australian, British and German weapon systems, mostly of WWII-vintage. ANL Infantry battalions were issued with MAS-36 (airborne units received the folding-stock MAS-36 CR39 paratrooper version), M1903 Springfield, and Lee–Enfield SMLE Mk III bolt-action rifles, MAS-49 semi-automatic rifles, MAS-49/56 semi-automatic carbines and M1A1 paratrooper carbines, along with Sten, Owen, M1A1 Thompson, MAS-38 and MAT-49 submachine guns; FM 24/29, Bren, M1918A2 BAR and Browning M1919A6 .30 Cal light machine guns were used as squad weapons, while MAC-31A2 7.65mm medium machine guns were employed as company weapons. Officers and NCOs received Modèle 1935A, MAS-35-S, Luger P08, Walther P38, or Colt.45 M1911A1 pistols. Springfield M1903A4 rifles and MAS-49/56 carbines fitted with telescopic sights were used as sniper weapons.

After 1955, the ANL began the process of standardisation on U.S. equipment. Airborne units took delivery of the M1 Garand semi-automatic rifle in late 1959, followed by the M1/M2 Carbine the following year. The M3A1 Grease Gun was also received, along with Smith & Wesson Model 39 pistols, and M1917 and Smith & Wesson Model 10 revolvers. The ANL (renamed RLA in 1961) was equally provided with Browning M1919A4 .30 Cal Medium machine guns and Browning M2HB .50 Cal Heavy machine guns. Limited quantities of the Sterling submachine gun and L1A1 SLR Assault rifle were acquired from the British for evaluation, but they were never adopted as standard weapons by the RLA. The Carl Gustaf m/45 (a.k.a. "Swedish K") submachine gun was provided in small numbers by the Americans, eventually finding its way into the irregular SGU units. An undisclosed number of Winchester Model 1200 pump-action shotguns were also provided. In 1969 secret deliveries of the CAR-15 carbine, the M16A1 assault rifle and the M60 machine gun arrived in Laos, and were initially only given to the Laotian Royal Guard and airborne units; standardisation to the CAR-15, the M16 and M60 in the RLA and the irregular SGUs was completed by 1971.

ANL and RLA infantry, airborne, and commando formations were equipped with a variety of crew-served weapons. Mortars ranged from the Brandt Mle 1935 60 mm and Brandt Mle 27/31 81 mm to the M19 60 mm, M29 81 mm, M2 4.2-inch (107 mm), M30 4.2 inch (106.7mm) models. They also received M18A1 57 mm, M20 75 mm, M67 90 mm and M40A1 106 mm recoilless rifles. In addition, individual portable rocket weapons were issued, in the form of the shoulder-fired M20A1 3.5 inch Super Bazooka, M79 "Blooper", XM-148 and M203 single-shot grenade launchers, and the expendable anti-tank, one-shot M72 LAW 66 mm.

Captured infantry weapons of Soviet and Chinese origin, such as Tokarev TT-33 and Makarov pistols, PPSh-41 submachine guns, SKS semi-automatic rifles, AK-47 assault rifles, RPD light machine guns, SG-43/SGM Goryunov medium machine guns, DShKM heavy machine guns, and RPG-2 and RPG-7 anti-tank rocket launchers were also employed by elite commando units and the irregular SGUs while on special operations in the enemy-held areas of north-eastern and south-eastern Laos.

=== Armoured vehicles ===
By the mid-1950s, the ANL armoured corps inventory consisted of fifteen M24 Chaffee light tanks whilst the reconnaissance armoured squadron was provided with twenty M8 Greyhound and M20 armoured utility cars. Mechanized infantry battalions were issued with M3 half-tracks and nineteen M3A1 Scout Cars. These obsolete armored vehicles were used mainly for convoy escort duty and static defense of local provincial capitals, being rarely engaged in more offensive operations against the Pathet Lao or the NVA.

The Neutralists received in December 1961 forty-five PT-76 Model 1951 amphibious light tanks and BTR-40 Armored Personnel Carriers from the Soviet Union, with the vehicles being subsequently taken into RLA service in 1963 and employed on offensive operations, only to be withdrawn from frontline service in November of the following year due to shortages of spare parts and ammunition. In August 1969, during Operation About Face, the offensive to recapture the Plain of Jars, the irregular Hmong SGU guerrilla forces managed to capture from the NVA some twenty-five PT-76B tanks and immediately pressed them into service, being subsequently engaged in the 1970 wet season offensive in the Plain of Jars, but once again maintenance problems soon rendered the vehicles inoperable.

The FAR General Staff then requested the delivery of modern M41 Walker Bulldog light tanks to the RLA armoured corps in order to provide better armor support to the Hmong SGU guerrillas, but their request was declined by Washington, who provided instead in 1970–71 some second-hand fifteen V-100 Commando armoured cars and twenty tracked M113 armored personnel carriers.

=== Artillery ===
Initially equipped with ten ex-French US M116 75 mm pack howitzers and some M8 HMC 75 mm self-propelled howitzers, the artillery corps fielded since 1963 twenty-five U.S.-supplied M101A1 105 mm towed field howitzers and ten M114A1 155 mm towed field howitzers received in 1969. The RLA suffered from a serious fire-support shortfall throughout the War, since its small artillery corps was incapable to counter effectively the threat posed by the Soviet 122 mm and 130 mm long-range towed howitzers employed from 1970 onwards by the NVA and the Pathet Lao, as they outranged the U.S.-made pieces.

=== Transport and liaison vehicles ===
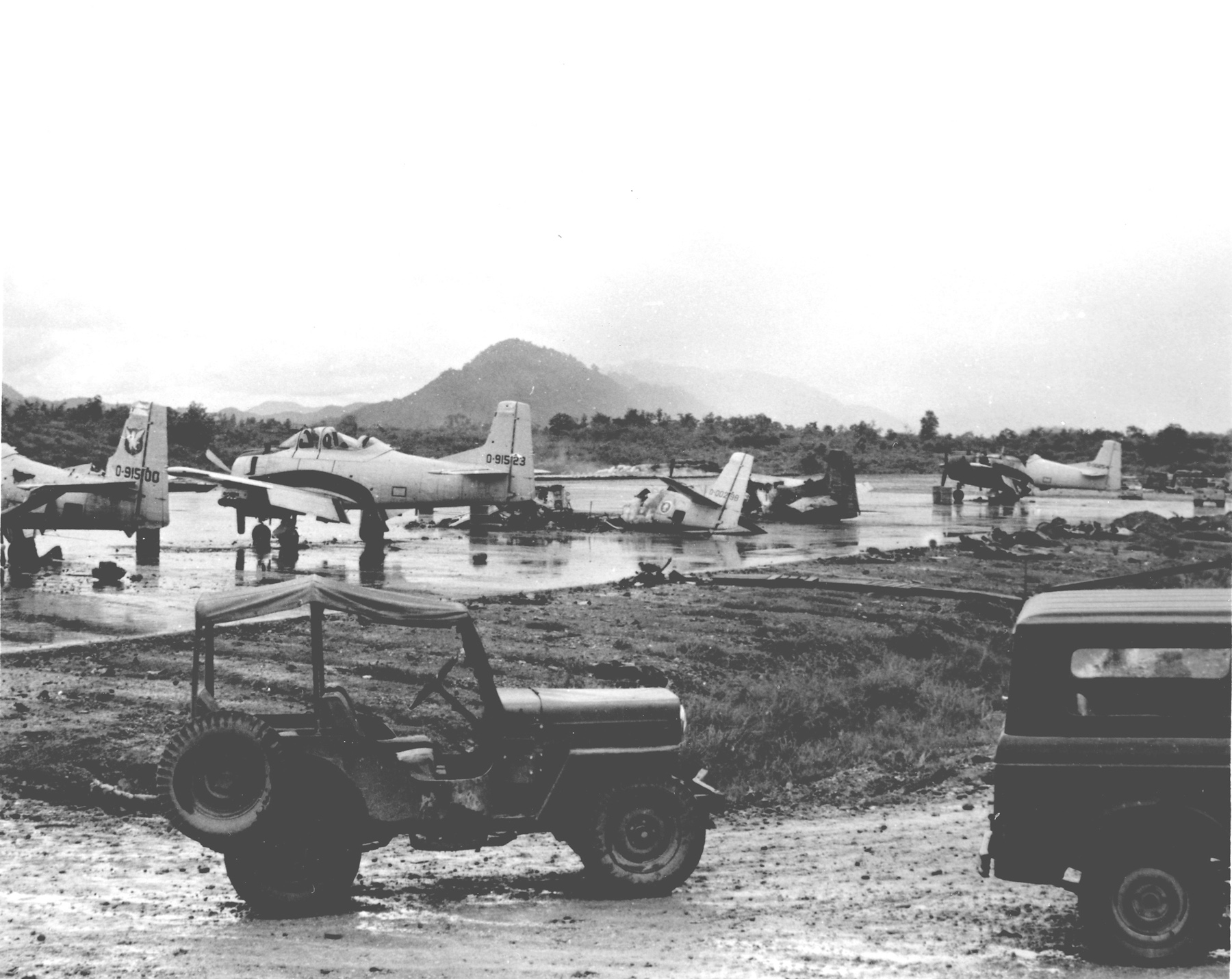
RLA Willys M38 MC jeep and a Jeepster Commando hardtop SUV parked at Luang Prabang airfield, 1967

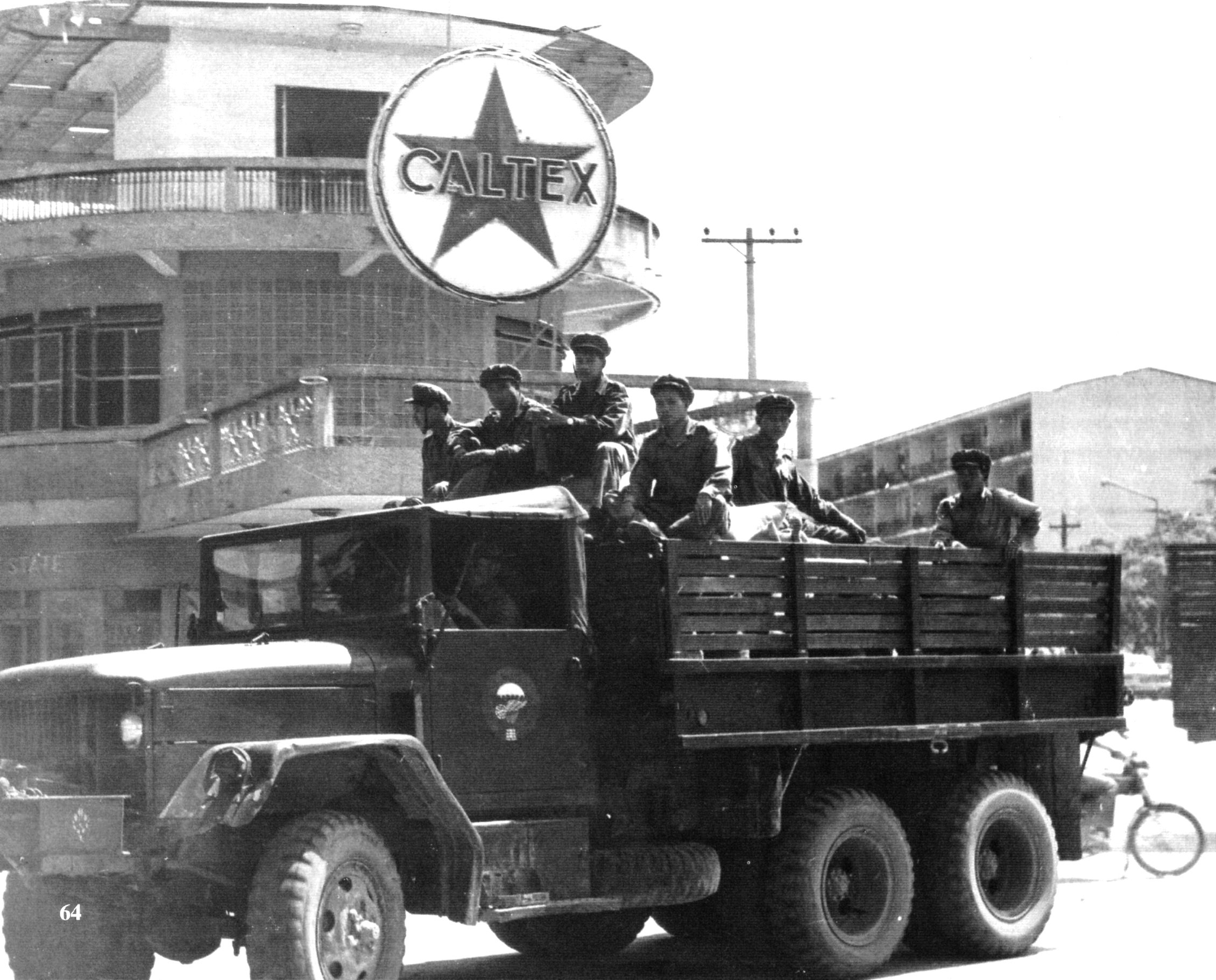
RLA M35A2 truck carrying Pathet Lao soldiers in Vientiane, 1973

Logistics were the responsibility of the transport corps, equipped with a variety of liaison and transportation vehicles handed down by the French or supplied by the Americans. The early ANL motor pool in the mid-1950s consisted in a mixed inventory of WWII-vintage U.S. Willys MB ¼-ton (4x4) jeeps, Dodge WC-51/52 ¾-ton (4x4) utility trucks, Dodge WC-56/57 ¾-ton (4×4) Command cars, Chevrolet G506 1½-ton (4x4) cargo trucks, and GMC CCKW 2½-ton (6x6) cargo trucks. These obsolete vehicles were partly superseded in the 1960s and early 1970s by modern U.S. Willys M38 MC ¼-ton (4x4) jeeps, Willys M38A1 MD ¼-ton (4x4) jeeps, M151A1 ¼-ton (4x4) utility trucks, Jeepster Commando (4x4) hardtop Sport utility vehicles (SUV), Dodge M37 ¾-ton (4x4) 1953 utility trucks, M35A2 2½-ton (6x6) cargo trucks and M809 5-ton (6x6) cargo trucks.

== Uniforms and insignia ==
The Royal Lao Army owed its origin and traditions to the Laotian colonial ANL and CEFEO troops on French service of the First Indochina War, and even after the United States took the role as the main foreign sponsor for the Royal Laotian Armed Forces at the beginning of the 1960s, French military influence was still perceptible in their uniforms and insignia.

=== Service dress uniforms ===
Upon its formation at the early 1950s, ANL units were initially outfitted as were French CEFEO troops of the period – the basic Laotian Army working dress for all-ranks was the French Army's M1945 tropical light khaki cotton shirt and pants (Tenue de toile kaki clair Mle 1945). Modelled after the World War II U.S. Army tropical "Chino" working dress, it consisted of a shirt with a six-buttoned front, two patch breast pockets closed by clip-cornered straight flaps and shoulder straps; the short-sleeved M1946 shirt (Chemisette kaki clair Mle 1946), which had two pleated breast pockets closed by pointed flaps, or the "Chino"-style M1949 (Chemisette kaki clair Mle 1949) could be worn as an alternative in hot weather. Both shirt models' were worn with the matching M1945 pants, which featured two pleats at the front hips; the M1946 khaki shorts (Culotte courte kaki clair Mle 1946) were also worn in lieu. The "Chino" working uniform was initially furnished by France and later by the U.S. aid programs(together with locally produced copies), continued to be worn by RLA officers and enlisted men as a service dress or for walking-out with a khaki tie.

RLA Officers continued to wear the standard ANL "summer" service dress uniform in khaki cotton, which was patterned after the French Army M1946/56 khaki dress uniform (French: Vareuse d'officier Mle 1946/56 et Pantalon droit Mle 1946/56). The open-collar jacket had two pleated breast pockets closed by pointed flaps and two unpleated at the side closed by either straight or pointed ones whilst the sleeves had false turnbacks; the front fly and pocket flaps were secured by gilt buttons. It was worn with a Khaki shirt and black tie on service dress. Two other variants of the RLA service dress uniform were adopted in the mid-1960s, a dark brown "winter" version was sometimes used during the rainy season, and a dark blue version was worn during overseas trips. Some RLA senior officers also adopted an Olive Green service and barrack dress uniform, consisting of a short-sleeved, beltless light bush jacket, which had two pleated breast pockets and two pleated side pockets, all closed by pointed or scalloped flaps, a five-button front fly and shoulder straps, and was worn with matching OG trousers.

=== Ceremonial and full dress uniforms ===
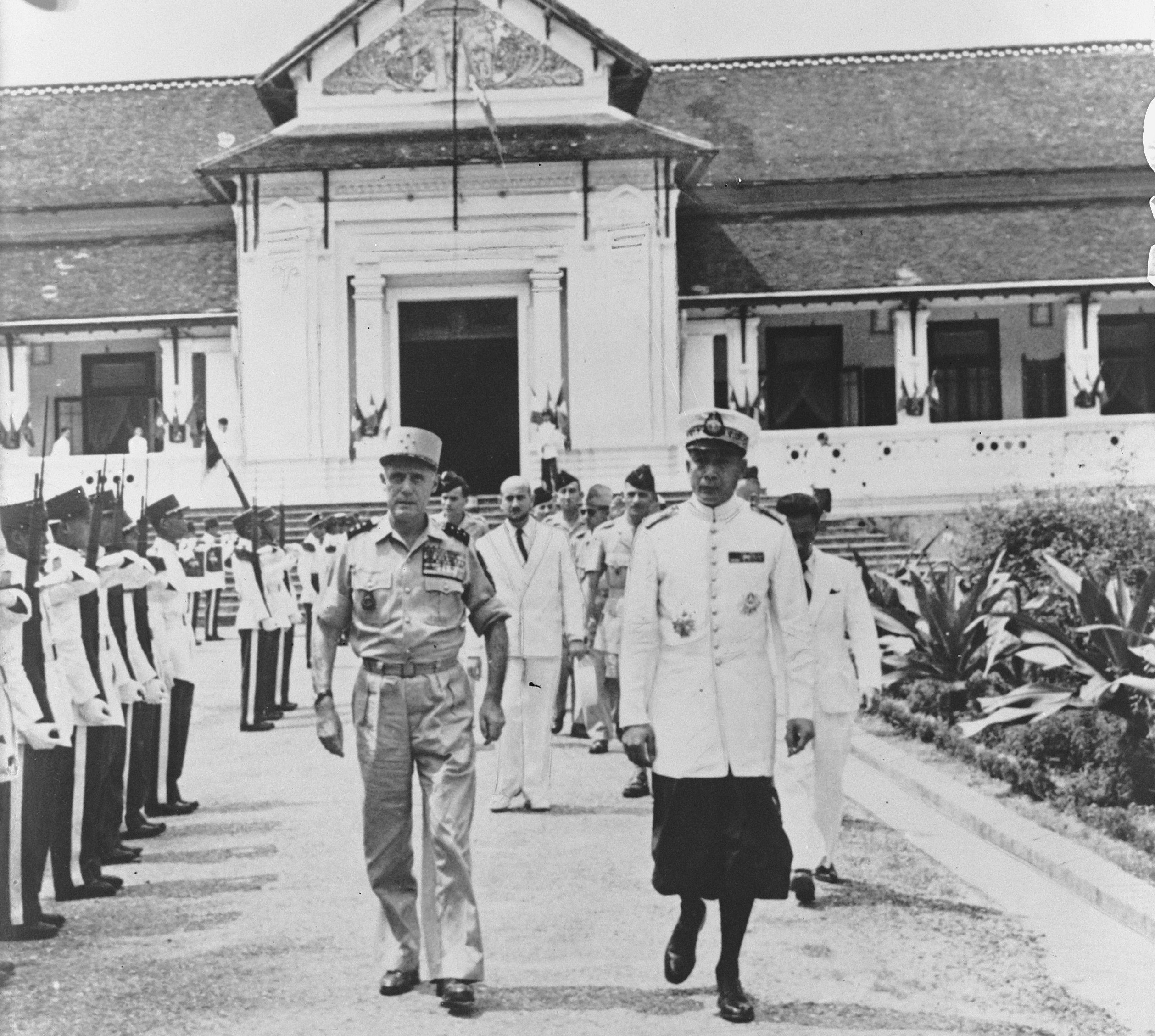
French General Raoul Salan and Lao Crown Prince Sisavang Vatthana inspecting an honour guard of the Laotian Royal Guard at left wearing their ceremonial full dress uniform outside the Royal Palace in Luang Prabang, 4 May 1953

A French-style, colonial-era white summer cotton dress uniform was initially worn by ANL officers for formal occasions, replaced in 1954 by an almost identical light khaki cotton version first adopted by senior officers serving in the ANL General Staff, and continued to be worn by their FAR successors until 1975. The new khaki dress consisted of an eight-buttoned tunic with a standing collar, provided with two breast pockets and two side pockets, all unpleated and closed by clip-cornered straight flaps, worn with matching khaki slacks. The tunic's front fly and pocket flaps were secured by gilt metal buttons bearing the FAR wreathed "Shiva" trident. A white version of identical cut, designated as "dress whites", was subsequently adopted as the standard full dress uniform for the entire FAR officer corps, whereas a black version was used briefly during Major general Phoumi Nosavan's tenure as defense minister in 1962–64.

ANL and FAR senior officers received a French-style ceremonial full dress uniform, combining a seven-buttoned white cotton tunic with standing collar lacking pockets and cotton black trousers with a double line of gold braid down the outer side-seams, which was only used during the most formal ceremonies with the King in attendance. Another variant of the FAR "dress whites", of identical cut to the khaki "summer" service dress uniform, included a white cotton open-collar jacket and matching white cotton trousers, worn with a white shirt and black tie. A dark blue version with standing collar was sometimes used during overseas trips.

The Laotian Royal Guard (Garde Royale du Laos) were also given a ceremonial full dress uniform of French pattern, comprising a red kepi, white eight-buttoned cotton tunic with a standing collar and red fringed epaulettes, plus red cotton trousers with a line of gold braid down the outer side-seams.

=== Fatigue and field uniforms ===
The standard ANL field dress during the Indochina War was the French all-arms M1947 drab green fatigues (Treillis de combat Mle 1947), whilst airborne battalions received in the late 1940s surplus World War II-vintage U.S. Army M1942 non-reversible and U.S. Marines M1943 and M1944 "Frog Skin" reversible camouflage utilities and British M1942 windproof pattern brushstroke camouflage Denison Smocks. Such early camouflage fatigues were gradually phased out from the early 1950s in favour of French-designed Lizard (Ténue Leopard) camouflage M1947/51, M1947/52 and M1947/53-54 TAP jump-smocks and M1947/52 TTA vests with matching trousers.

By the mid-1960s, RLA units in the field were using a wide variety of uniforms depending on availability from foreign aid sources, namely the United States, Thailand, and South Vietnam. The old French M1947 fatigues soon gave way to the U.S. Army OG-107 jungle utilities, which was adopted as standard field dress by all the Laotian military regular and paramilitary irregular forces; M1967 Jungle Utility Uniforms also came into use in 1970–71. Local variants of the OG-107 fatigues often featured modifications to the original design – shirts with shoulder straps, two "cigarrete pockets" closed by buttoned straight flaps on both upper sleeves, or a pen pocket added on the left sleeve above the elbow, an affection common to all Laotian, South Vietnamese and Cambodian military officers, and additional side "cargo" pockets on the trousers. Olive green U.S. M-1951 field jackets were sometimes worn by RLA and irregular SGU personnel.

Camouflage was very popular among the Laotian military. Airborne formations continued to wear Lizard camouflage fatigues up until 1975, and new camouflage patterns were adopted by the RLA and the irregular SGUs throughout the 1960s–1970s. First was the Duck hunter pattern, followed by the similar South Vietnamese "Leopard" pattern (Vietnamese: Beo Gam) and the "earth-colour flower" (Vietnamese: Hoa Mâu Dât) pattern (incidentally, the same pattern used by the South Vietnamese National Police Field Force), a South Vietnamese-produced copy of the American-designed Mitchell "Clouds" camouflage pattern, which incorporated overlapping dark brown, russet, beige, light brown and ochre cloud-shaped blotches on a tan background. Also employed were Tigerstripe patterns from the United States, Thailand (Thai Tadpole and the so-called 'Rubber' Tigerstripe variant) and South Vietnam (Tadpole Sparse), and Highland patterns (ERDL 1948 Leaf pattern or "Woodland pattern"), the latter being either provided by the same sources or locally produced.

=== Headgear ===
ANL officers received a service peaked cap copied after the French M1927 pattern (Casquette d'officier Mle 1927) with a lacquered black leather peak in both light khaki and white summer versions (the latter with gold embroidered flame decoration on the black cap band for general officers), to wear with the khaki service dress and the white high-collared full dress uniforms, respectively. The peaked caps were worn with the standard gilt metal ANL cap device, a wreathed Airavata crest bearing the Laotian Royal Arms (Erawan) – a three-headed white elephant standing on a pedestal and surmounted by a pointed parasol – set on a black felt teardrop-shaped background patch. Upon the creation of the Royal Lao Armed Forces (FAR) in September 1961, the Royal Lao Army (RLA) adopted a new service peaked cap with crown of "Germanic" shape – very similar to that worn by South Vietnamese ARVN officers – with the standard gilt metal FAR wreathed trident cap device, though some field officers still wore the old ANL badge on their caps up until the mid-1960s. Like its predecessor, the new RLA service peaked cap also came in both khaki, dark brown, dark blue, and white versions, with a gold cord chinstrap and plain black leather peak for intermediate rank officers whereas general officers' caps had gold embroidered flame decoration on both the black cap band and black leather peak and a gold braid chinstrap. French M1946 and M1957 light khaki sidecaps (Bonnet de police de toile kaki clair Mle 1946 and Bonnet de police de toile kaki clair Mle 1957) were also worn by all-ranks. The Laotian Royal Guards received a French-style red kepi with a straight lacquered black leather peak and gold braid chinstrap to wear with their ceremonial full dress uniform.

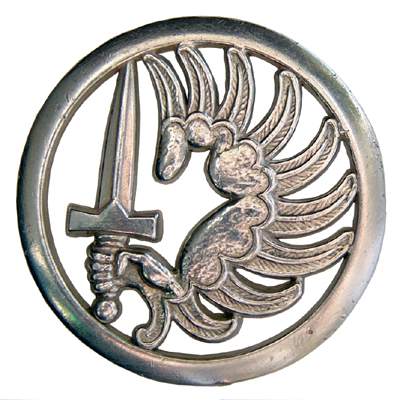
Circled Winged Armed Dextrochere beret badge of the French Army Metropolitan Paratroopers, also used by the Royal Laotian Army Paratroopers from 1951 to 1975

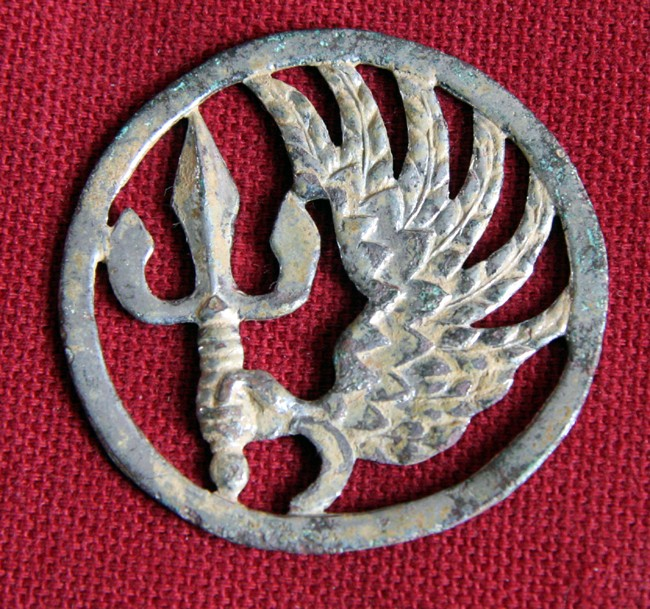
Royal Laotian Army Paratroopers' beret badge, used between 1959 and 1975

The most common headgear for the ANL personnel during the 1950s was the French M1946 "Gourka" tropical beret (Bérét de toile kaki clair Mle 1946), made of light khaki cotton cloth, but later the RLA standardized on a beret pattern whose design was based on the French M1953/59 model (Bérét Mle 1953/59); it was made of wool in either one or two pieces, attached to a black leather rim with two black tightening straps at the back. In the FAR, berets were still being worn pulled to the left in typical French fashion, with the color sequence for the ground forces as follows: General Service – scarlet red (the Kingdom of Laos' national color); Paratroopers, Para-Commandos and Special Forces – maroon; Armoured Cavalry – black; Military Police – dark blue. Berets made of camouflage cloth in the "Duck hunter", "Leopard", "Tigerstripe" and "Highland" patterns were also used in the field, particularly by elite units within the RLA and by the irregular SGU formations. According to the 1959 regulations, General Service and corps' berets were worn with the standard RLA beret badge placed above the right eye. Issued in gilt metal for officers and in silver metal for the rank-and-file, it consisted of a trident, symbolizing the Hindu God Shiva, superimposed on a spinning Buddhist "Wheel of Law" (Chakra) whose design recalled a circular saw. There were however exceptions to this rule, such as the Laotian airborne battalions who retained the silver closed "winged armed dextrochere", consisting of a "right winged arm" armed with a dagger pointing upwards, previously adopted by the French Army Metropolitan Paratroopers in 1946. A modified version of this beret badge, with a different winged arm design holding a Laotian trident in lieu of a dagger, was adopted in 1959. It never replaced intirely the earlier French beret badge, with both versions – dagger and trident – being used interchangeably by the Laotian paratrooper battalions through 1975. A miniature pin-on silver metal version of the FAR cap badge edged scarlet red was sometimes worn placed on the front panel of OG fatigue and baseball caps by both officers and enlisted men.

Laotian troops in the field could be encountered wearing a wide range of Khaki or OG jungle hats and patrol caps, ranging from French M1949 bush hats (Chapeau de brousse Mle 1949) and U.S. M-1943 HBT "Walker caps" and M-1951 field caps (soon replaced by a locally designed stiffened fatigue/field cap provided with a short peak and a false cloth chinstrap), to baseball caps, U.S. Boonie hats, and even South Vietnamese ARVN fatigue caps (similar in shape to the U.S. Marines utility cap). Interestingly, the irregular ethnic SGU troops adopted an Olive Green Mao cap strongly reminiscent of what was worn by the Pathet Lao guerrillas. Camouflage versions of these headpieces also found their way into the RLA and the SGUs from the United States, Thailand and South Vietnam, to which were soon added Laotian-made copies.

Steel helmets, in the form of the U.S. M-1 and French M1951 NATO (Casque Mle 1951 OTAN) models were standard issue in the ANL, with paratroopers receiving either the U.S. M-1C jump helmet and its respective French-modified versions (Casque USM1 TAP type Métropole and Casque USM1 TAP type EO) or the airborne pattern of the French M1951 helmet, the M1951 TAP (Casque type TAP, modéle 1951). Later, the RLA standardized on the modernized U.S. M-1 model 1964 helmet, though the older American and French M1951 helmet patterns could still be encountered in the field among certain regular and irregular Laotian troops late as 1971. ANL armoured crews initially received the French M1951 and M1958/65 dark olive green leather crash helmets (Sous-casque radio-char modéle 1951, Sous-casque radio-char modéle 1958 and Sous-casque radio-char modéle 1965); after 1971, Laotian V-100 and M113 APC crewmen were issued the fibreglass U.S. Combat Vehicle Crew (CVC) T-56-6 helmet (dubbed the "bone dome"), though neither models offered any satisfactory protection against shrapnel or small arms rounds.

=== Footwear ===
White low laced leather shoes were prescribed to wear with the FAR "dress whites" cotton full dress, whilst brown ones were worn with the khaki service/work uniform for all-ranks and, after 1954 the latter were required for RLA officers wearing the new FAR officers' khaki dress uniform on formal occasions; black shoes were worn with the khaki "summer", dark brown "winter" and dark blue "overseas" service dress uniforms, and with the white-and-black ceremonial full dress uniform. ANL personnel on the field initially wore a mixture of American and French regulation footwear, including brown leather U.S. Army Service Shoes, brown leather U.S. M-1943 Combat Service Boots, French M1917 brown leather hobnailed ankle boots (Brodequins modéle 1917), French M1953 brown leather "Rangers" (Rangers modéle 1953) and French Pataugas olive canvas-and-rubber jungle boots, replaced by flip-flops and leather peasant sandals while in garrison; paratroopers received the calf-length French M1950 or M1950/53 TAP (Bottes de saut modéle 1950 et 1950/53) brown or black leather jump-boot models. Black leather combat boots were also provided by the Americans who issued both the early U.S. Army M-1962 "McNamara" model and the M-1967 model with DMS "ripple" pattern rubber sole; the highly prized U.S. Army Jungle boot was not issued to the RLA but saw limited use after 1971 amongst members of elite units (e.g. Paratroopers, Special Forces) or by irregular guerrilla troops fighting in the jungle environment of southern Laos. Local copies of the Canadian Bata tropical boots and South Vietnamese black canvas-and-rubber Indigenous Combat Boots were also worn in the south.

=== Army ranks ===
Initially, ANL troops wore the same rank insignia as their French counterparts (with the addition of a miniature gilt combined trident and "chakra" device on the inner end of their shoulder boards and shoulder straps' slides), whose sequence followed the French Army pattern defined by the 1956 regulations. In 1959, the Royal Lao Army adopted a new distinctively Laotian-designed system of military ranks, which became in September 1961 the standard rank chart for all branches of service of the newly created Royal Lao Armed Forces.

Under the new regulations, officers were entitled to wear on their service or dress uniforms stiffened red shoulder boards (pattes d'épaule) edged with gold braid and a gold wreathed trident at the inner end. Junior officers (Officiers subalternes) added an appropriate number of five-pointed gold stars to their boards whilst field grade officers (Officiers supérieures) had a single lotus leaf rosette, plus an appropriate number of five-pointed gold stars. Field Marshals and General officers (Marechaux et Officiers Géneraux) had a gold leaf design around the lower half of their shoulder boards plus two or more five-pointed silver stars. Senior and junior NCOs (Sous-officiers) – including Private 1st class – wore cloth chevrons on both upper sleeves; enlisted men (Hommes de troupe) wore no insignia.

In the field, officers' shoulder boards were initially replaced by metal rank insignia pinned to simple rectangular red cloth tabs sewn over the right shirt or combat jacket pocket, or on shoulder strap slides, but some senior officers kept the custom of wearing instead a single chest tab (patte de poitrine) pinned to the shirt's front fly following French Army practice. By the late 1960s, an American-style system was adopted in which metal pin-on or embroidered cloth rank insignia – either in yellow-on-green full-colour or black-on-green subdued form – were worn on the right collar, although metal rank insignia could also be worn pinned directly to the shoulder straps. Photographic evidence shows that officers on the field also had the habit of displaying their rank insignia on berets, baseball caps, bush hats and (more rarely) on steel helmets.

=== Rank insignia ===
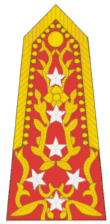
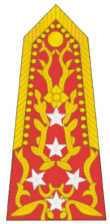
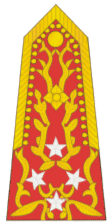
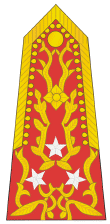
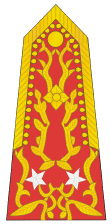
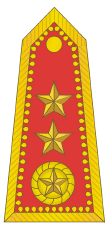
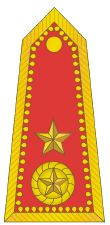
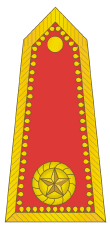
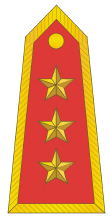
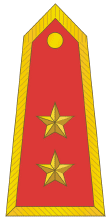
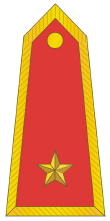
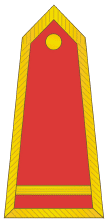
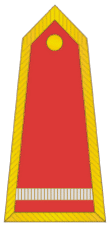
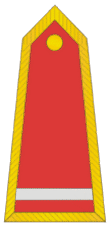
Royal Lao Army
Royal Lao Army	Field marshal Choum Phoun	General; Phoun Êek	Lieutenant general Phoun Thö	Major general Phoun Trïï	Brigadier general Phoun Chatäävä	Colonel; Phan Êek	Lieutenant Colonel; Phan Thö	Major; Phan Trïï	Captain; Loei Êek	1st lieutenant Loei Thö	2nd lieutenant Loei Trïï	Officer designate (Warrant officer); Wáa Trii Haui Trii	Cadet 2nd year Nakhian naihony äkäd	Cadet 1st year Nakhian naihony äkäd

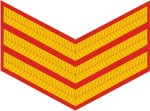
Royal Lao Army								No insignia
Royal Lao Army	Sergeant major Cãã Êek	Master sergeant Cãã Thó	Sergeant 1st class Cãã Trii	Staff sergeant Sip Êek	Sergeant; Sip Thó	Corporal; Sip Trii	Private 1st class Sip	Private; Phonthahan

=== Branch insignia ===
RLA skill and trade badges also came in gilt metal and/or enamelled pin-on and cloth embroidered yellow or black-on-green subdued variants. On dress and service uniforms, they were worn on both collars by all-ranks if shoulder boards were worn, but in the field, officers wore them on the left shirt collar only if worn alongside collar rank insignia; enlisted ranks usually wore branch insignia on both collars instead:

- Infantry (Infanterie) – crossed Lao swords superimposed upon a round shield
- Armoured units (Troupes Blindées)
- Artillery (Artillerie) – crossed cannons superimposed upon a round shield
- Airborne forces (Troupes Aeroportées/Parachutistes) – combined crossed rifles and open parachute canopy, later replaced by a Buddhist temple monkey (Hanuman) holding a Lotus leaf rosette
- Medical (Serviçe de Santé)
- Quartermaster (Service de Intendance)
- Engineer (Génie) – Vishnu figure seated on a red and green enamelled cartouche
- Signals (Transmissions)
- Geographic services (Service Géographique)
- Finance (Finances)
- Transport (Train)
- Maintenance (Réparation du Matériel – RM)
- Military logistics (Service de Matériel)
- Ordnance (Munitions)
- Military Fuel/Petrol, Oil and Lubricants – POL (Service de Essence)
- Military police (Prevôtée Militaire or Police Militaire – PM)
- Military justice (Justice Militaire)
- Psychological warfare (Guerre Psychologique)
- Military intelligence (Renseignement Militaire)

=== Unit insignia ===
Royal Laotian parachutist badge

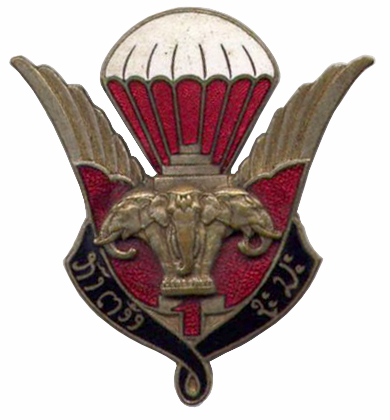
1st Laotian Parachute Battalion insignia, 1951–54.

Like the South Vietnamese ARVN, the RLA was given to creating unit insignia for formations even down to the company level. Following the French example, ANL officers initially wore metal unit insignia suspended from pocket hangers over their right breast button; enlisted personnel wore cloth versions on the left shoulder. By the 1960s pocket hangers had been phased out in the RLA and all ranks wore shoulder unit insignia. Parachute wings were worn above the right shirt or jacket pocket, whilst foreign airborne qualification badges went over the left pocket.

It was common RLA practice to place regimental or divisional insignia on the left shoulder, whilst insignia for military regions or the General Staff went on the right. Battalion insignia, on the rare occasions worn, usually went on a chest pocket. Elite formations such as the Special Commando Company of the 2nd RLA Strike Division had their unit designation printed over their left pocket. Yellow and subdued nametapes were occasionally worn above the right shirt or jacket pocket on field dress; black plastic nameplates with white lettering were worn with the service and dress uniforms.

== See also ==
- Army of the Republic of Vietnam (ARVN)
- Air America
- Battle of Lang Vei
- Directorate of National Coordination (DNC)
- Hmong people
- Pathet Lao
- Project Unity (Laos)
- Khmer National Armed Forces
- North Vietnamese invasion of Laos
- Lao Veterans of America
- Lao Veterans of America Institute
- Laos Memorial
- Laotian Civil War
- List of weapons of the Laotian Civil War
- Royal Lao Air Force
- Royal Lao Army Airborne
- Royal Lao Navy
- Royal Lao Police
- Royal Thai Army (RTA)
- Vietnam War
- 1967 Opium War
