= Thao Ty =

Laotian Army general

- Died: May 1975
- Military career
- Allegiance: Kingdom of Laos
- Branch: Royal Lao Police; Directorate of National Coordination; Royal Lao Army
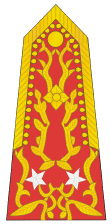
- Rank: Brigadier general
- Commands: 1st Special Mobile Group; Special Guerrilla Units; 2nd Strike Division; SPECOM
- Conflicts: Laotian Civil War

Brigadier general Thao Ty Lithilusa (? – May 1975), best known as Thao Ty (not to be confused with Hmong Colonel Thao Pao Ly, Chief-of-Staff of Military Region 3), was a Laotian Paratrooper officer and commander of the Airborne Forces and the Special Forces of the Royal Lao Army (French: Armée Royale du Laos – ARL), the land component of the Royal Lao Armed Forces (French: Forces Armées du Royaume – FAR), the official military of the Kingdom of Laos during the 1960s and 1970s.

== Career ==
Lt. Col. Thao Ty rose to prominence in 1963 when he replaced Brigadier general Siho Lamphouthacoul as the commander of 1st Special Mobile Group (French: Groupement Mobile Speciale 1 – GMS 1), the para-commando regiment of the Directorate of National Coordination (French: Direction de Coordination Nationale – DCN) Security Agency. After the forcible DNC's disbandment in February 1965, Thao Ty was transferred to the Royal Lao Army (RLA) and given command of the RLA's second airborne regiment, Mobile Group 21 (French: Groupement Mobile 21 Aeroportée – GM 21).

In 1970, he transferred again to the CIA-run guerrilla programme in Savannakhet and was posted in charge of all irregular Special Guerrilla Units (SGU) forces in the Military Region 3 (MR 3). During the following year he was promoted to Brigadier general after his participation in retaking the town of Paksong in December 1972. He then transferred back to the regular Army in order to head the newly formed 2nd Strike Division (French: 2éme Division d'Intervention) and in that capacity, he created a new elite unit, the Special Commando Company (French: Compagnie Commando Speciale – CCS) or SPECOM for short.

== Death ==
In May 1975 Brig. Gen. Thao Ty was quickly arrested and executed by the Pathet Lao.

== See also ==
- Brigadier general Thao Ma
- Colonel Bounleuth Saycocie
- Directorate of National Coordination
- Laotian Civil War
- Major general Ouane Rattikone
- Major general Phoumi Nosavan
- Major general Vang Pao
- SPECOM
- Royal Lao Armed Forces
- Royal Lao Army
- Royal Lao Army Airborne
- Royal Lao Police
