= Nam Bak district =

Coordinates: 20.6256°N 102.4744°E

Nam Bak district ເມືອງນ້ຳບາກ
- District
- Interactive map of Nam Bak district
- Country: Laos
- Province: Luang Prabang
- Time zone: UTC+7 (ICT)

Nam Bak is a district (muang) of Luang Prabang province in northern Laos.
