= Mụ Giạ Pass =

Mountain pass in Vietnam

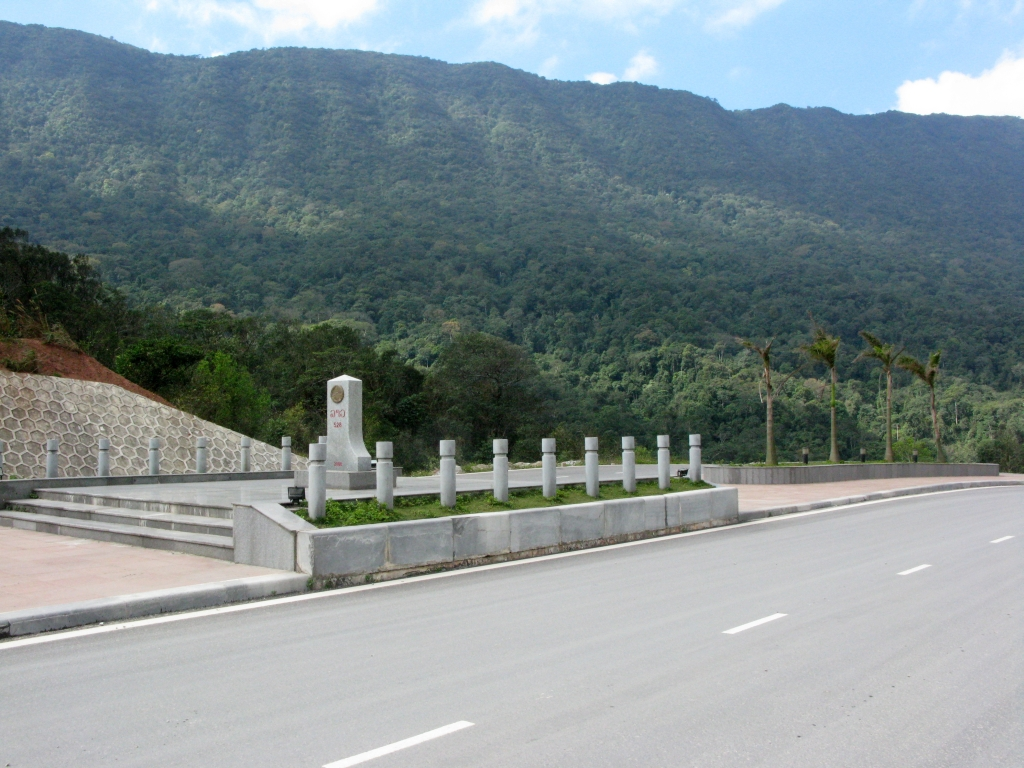
- Top of Mu Gia Pass in Route #12 Vietnam-Laos

- Location within Vietnam
- Elevation: 418 metres (1,371 ft)

Location
- Location: Vietnam–Laos border
- Range: Annamite Range
- Coordinates: 17°39′53″N 105°45′45″E

The Mụ Giạ Pass (Đèo Mụ Giạ, Quảng Bình) is a mountain pass in the Annamite Range between northern Vietnam and Laos, located 90 km northwest of Đồng Hới, Vietnam. The pass is 418 m above sea level and connects National Road 15 from Tân Ấp in Vietnam to Route 12 in Khammouane Province in Laos.

== Importance during Vietnam War ==
During the Vietnam War the pass was the principal point of entry into the Ho Chi Minh Trail through Laos. A CIA landscape analysis prepared in February 1966 described Route 15 as threading "its way upstream along a narrow, steep-sided valley. To the left rise dog-toothed limestone peaks, to the right is a flat-topped plateau. Dense tropical rain forest covers the entire area, almost frustrating aerial observation. The road is carved out of the steep hillside, for in most places there is not enough room for both road and stream in the constricted bottom of the ravine". Due to its difficult geography, the pass was identified as a choke point, as a result, it was heavily bombed first as part of Operation Barrel Roll and later as part of Operation Rolling Thunder and Operation Commando Hunt. In March 1966, it was estimated that 75% of all truck traffic into Laos went through the pass.

On 12 April 1966, 29 B-52s attacked the pass for the first time in the largest bombing mission since World War II, using a combination of subsurface and delayed action bombs over a 5 km section, but the pass was not closed by landslides as had been hoped for. A second B-52 strike took place on 26 April but the damage was repaired within 10 hours and convoys were seen using the pass the next day. A CIA report noted that the "Communists will spare no effort to keep it open". Despite frequent bombing, the United States Air Force and United States Navy were never able to put the pass out of operation for any sustained period of time. The People's Army of Vietnam (PAVN) also constructed several bypass roads around the pass to the east and west of Route 12 in Laos and later a series of petrol, oil and lubricants (POL) pipelines through the pass. The PAVN progressively built up their air defences around the pass, first installing smaller calibre anti-aircraft artillery (AAA), then larger calibre (100mm) AAA, by 1966 more than 300 AAA sites had been identified around the pass. By 1972 SAM-2 missiles covered approaches to the pass, forcing B-52s and gunships to keep their distance reducing the interdiction effort.

In 1967, at the request of the United States Department of Defense, the JASON (advisory group) considered the possibility of detonating a tactical nuclear weapon at the Mụ Giạ Pass to halt PAVN transportation on the Ho Chi Minh Trail. The JASON scientists advised against it since "US first-use of tactical nuclear weapons could lead China or the Soviet Union to provide similar weapons to the Viet Cong and North Vietnam" per 2003 Congressional Record, Vol. 149, Page S3405 (March 10, 2003).
