= Seno, Laos =

Seno (Xeno) ເຊໂນ
- Municipality
- Seno or Xeno
- Location within Laos
- Coordinates: 16°40′41.59″N 104°57′51.87″E
- Country: Laos
- Province: Savannakhet
- District: Outhoumphone

Population (2015)
  - Total: 25,135
- Time zone: UTC+07:00 (ICT)

Seno (Lao: ເຊໂນ) is a town located in the Savannakhet Province of Laos.

Seno held the highest temperature recorded in Laos when 42.3 °C (108.1 °F) was observed on 12 April 2016. That ended when Luang Prabang reached 42.7 °C (108.9 °F) on 19 April 2023 and later 43.5 °C (110.3 °F) on 6 May 2023.

== Climate ==
Climate data for Seno (Xeno) (1991–2020)
Month	Jan	Feb	Mar	Apr	May	Jun	Jul	Aug	Sep	Oct	Nov	Dec	Year
Mean daily maximum °C (°F)	28.5 (83.3)	30.8 (87.4)	33.2 (91.8)	34.1 (93.4)	32.4 (90.3)	31.1 (88.0)	29.9 (85.8)	29.4 (84.9)	29.9 (85.8)	30.0 (86.0)	29.1 (84.4)	27.4 (81.3)	30.5 (86.9)
Daily mean °C (°F)	21.6 (70.9)	23.7 (74.7)	26.7 (80.1)	28.2 (82.8)	27.6 (81.7)	27.2 (81.0)	26.4 (79.5)	26.1 (79.0)	26.1 (79.0)	25.4 (77.7)	23.9 (75.0)	21.5 (70.7)	25.4 (77.7)
Mean daily minimum °C (°F)	15.9 (60.6)	17.9 (64.2)	21.2 (70.2)	23.4 (74.1)	24.2 (75.6)	24.3 (75.7)	23.9 (75.0)	23.7 (74.7)	23.4 (74.1)	21.9 (71.4)	19.6 (67.3)	16.7 (62.1)	21.3 (70.3)
Average precipitation mm (inches)	3.7 (0.15)	17.2 (0.68)	35.0 (1.38)	57.3 (2.26)	169.2 (6.66)	195.6 (7.70)	266.8 (10.50)	302.7 (11.92)	210.3 (8.28)	67.1 (2.64)	7.2 (0.28)	2.8 (0.11)	1,334.8 (52.55)
Average precipitation days (≥ 1.0 mm)	1	2	4	6	12	15	18	20	16	6	1	1	100
Mean monthly sunshine hours	230.0	201.0	194.0	187.8	160.3	148.3	119.1	116.8	155.0	205.8	211.8	229.3	2,159.2
Source: NOAA
