= 1973 Laotian coup attempt =

1973 Laotian coup d'état attempt
- Part of Laotian Civil War
Date	20 August 1973
Location	Wattay International Airport, Vientiane, Laos
Result	Coup fails, Thao Ma executed

Belligerents
Thao Ma loyalists	Souvanna Phouma loyalists

Commanders and leaders
Thao Ma (executed); Bounleuth Saycocie	Sourith Don Sasorith

Strength
Appx. 60	Unknown

Casualties and losses
10 killed 14 captured	10 killed

The 1973 Laotian coup d'état attempt was a final attempt to stave off a communist coalition government of the Kingdom of Laos. Exiled General Thao Ma returned from the Kingdom of Thailand on 20 August 1973 to take over Wattay International Airport outside the capital of Vientiane. Commandeering an AT-28, he led air strikes upon the office and home of his hated rival, General Kouprasith Abhay. While Thao Ma was unsuccessfully bombing Kouprasith, loyal Royalist troops retook the airfield. Shot down upon his return, Thao Ma was hauled from his airplane's wreckage and executed. The coalition agreement was signed 14 September 1973.

== Overview ==
Political factionalism within the upper ranks of the Royal Lao Army led to a series of coups in the Kingdom of Laos during the Laotian Civil War of the 1960s. When Phoumi Nosavan was forced into exile in February 1965, he could no longer use his influence to shield the officers in his rightwing faction. General Thao Ma, commander of the Royal Lao Air Force was one of those officers; he also went into exile in the neighboring Thailand, after his unsuccessful 1966 coup failed to take over the kingdom.

== Background ==
In 1973, former Laotian General Thao Ma was living in exile in Bangkok, Thailand, where he worked as an air dispatcher for Air France for $270 per month. By the beginning of August, a deal was being thrashed out for a coalition government that would include the Laotian communist insurrectionists. Several Royal Lao Army officers traveled to Bangkok to keep Thao Ma posted on events. Rumors of a potential coup by Thao Ma began to surface in the Laotian capital of Vientiane.

== The coup ==
Despite the advance warnings, Thao Ma managed to surprise the populace of Vientiane. At 05:00 on 20 August 1973, he and about 60 of his followers boated across the Mekong River into the capital. Thao Ma was greeted enthusiastically by RLAF personnel at Wattay Airport, and began handing out blue and white scarves of allegiance to his followers. While Bounleut Saycocie took an armored car into town to secure the radio station, other rebels captured the bank and Prime Minister Souvanna Phouma's vacant house. At 07:00, Bounleut began broadcasting anti-communist communiques from the insurrectionists.

With his underlings attending to the seizure of Vientiane, Thao Ma commandeered an AT-28 fighter-bomber. Accounts disagree on the number of sorties flown by Thao Ma and his wingmen. While contemporary news accounts state Thao Ma flew at least three times, historians note only that he was accompanied by six loyal pilots. It is agreed that his principal target was a fellow general whom he hated, Kouprasith Abhay. Both Kouprasith's home and office were bombed by the AT-28s, but missed him. As Royalist troops began to rally against the coup, American colonel Al Degroote drove to the home of the commanding general of the Air Force. General Sourith Don Sasorith refused to come out of hiding, and lurked in his house with a blue and white scarf handy.

Even with Sourith's refusal to fight against it, the coup began to unravel. Royalist troops promptly recaptured the airfield. A Royalist soldier manning a truck-mounted machine gun managed to hit Thao Ma's aircraft. He crash-landed his smoking plane on Wattay's overrun area. An Air America crash truck crew fished him from the wreckage. He was capable of sitting up on his stretcher and thanking his rescuers.

By 11:00, the coup was over. Thao Ma was tossed into a truck and taken to Kouprasith's headquarters where Kouprasith had his bodyguard shoot Thao Ma.

== Aftermath ==
There were ten killed on either side, and 14 insurrectionists captured. Bounleuth Saycocie stole a helicopter to escape.

On 14 September 1973, the agreement to establish the Third Coalition Government was signed.
