= 1966 Laotian coup d'état =

1966 Laotian coup
- Part of Laotian Civil War
Date	October 21–22, 1966
Location	Laos
Result	General Thao Ma forced into exile

Belligerents
Forces of Ouane and Bounthone Marthepharak	Forces of Thao Ma

Commanders and leaders
General Ouane; General Bounthone Marthepharak	General Thao Ma

Casualties and losses
23 dead	None

The 1966 Laotian coup d'état was brought about by political infighting concerning control of the Royal Lao Air Force, and use of its transports for smuggling. General Thao Ma, who wished to reserve the transports for strictly military use, was forced into exile on 22 October 1966 by fellow generals angling to use the transports for smuggling opium and gold.

== Overview ==
The 1966 coup grew out of Political factionalism in the military high command of the Kingdom of Laos. When General Phoumi Nosavan was forced into exile in February 1965, he no longer could use his influence to shield the subordinates in his faction. Brigadier General Thao Ma, commander of the Royal Lao Air Force (RLAF), was one of them.

== Background ==
Generals Kouprasith Abhay, Oudone Sananikone, and Ouane Rattikone plotted against the air force head. On 3 July 1965, a land mine blew up a jeep in Thao Ma's entourage in an attempted assassination. There was widespread agreement that his rivals were responsible. Later in the year, controversy flared over usage of the RLAF's transports. When three C-47s were delivered to air force headquarters in Savannakhet, Kouprasith and Ouane demanded their transfer to Wattay, where they would be available to the generals. Thao Ma refused the transfer on the grounds that the transports would be used for smuggling gold and opium instead of military use. To retaliate, promotions within the RLAF were limited.

On 1 April 1966, the General Staff held a planning meeting. After informing Kong Le that the RLA was about to absorb his Neutralist troops, they chastised Thao Ma for his independence, noting that the RLAF was a Royal Lao Army unit. His emphasis on raiding the Ho Chi Minh Trail instead of flying close air support for the infantry was criticized. On 21 April, General Ouane announced that Sourith Don Sasorith would be appointed to command the RLAF. A mutiny was then fomented within the RLAF in early May 1966, with the Chief of Staff and several fighter pilots bribed to cause trouble. By 12 May, the General Staff ordered Thao Ma to pass command to the RLAF Chief of Staff, take up staff duties in a new job, and move RLAF headquarters to Wattay Airbase outside Vientiane. In mid-May, the air force general met fellow conspirators Bounleut Saycocie, Thao Ty, and Nouphet Daoheuang on five consecutive nights. They decided to rebel against the General Staff on 4 June, the day before Thao Ma would pass command to his chief of staff.

However, Thao Ma began his revolt two days early, on 2 June 1966. General Nouphet's regiment surrounded the Savannakhet airstrip. However, the other plotters took no action, and the insurrection was over within 48 hours. The transports were split off into a separate Military Airlift Command under Sourith, leaving fighter operations to Thao Ma. He moved 30 loyal pilots and a dozen AT-28s to Luang Prabang.

Thao Ma found himself under an increasingly heavy emotional strain. The ongoing internal strife brought RLAF operations to a near standstill during Summer 1966. However, King Sisavang Vatthana's influence kept Thao Ma in his command. On 27 September, Thao Ma lost control of the transports. However, he remained in charge of the AT-28s, which were now dispersed into four air operations centers in four separate Military Regions of Laos. By early October, rumor had it that Thao Ma was about to be shuffled into a desk job. On 16 October, the General Staff forced Kong Le into exile. According to one source, Thao Ma was not immediately aware of this, and counted on Kong Le's aid in a coup situation.

== The coup ==
On 20 October 1966, General Ouane and General Bounthone Marthepharak were in Savannakhet on a duty round. In the wake of Kong Le's forced departure, Thao Ma felt both his career and his life were in danger. He lined up a $31,000 slush fund to bribe two regiments stationed in the vicinity of Savannakhet. Nouphet would seize Ouane and Bounthoune while Thao Ma would lead an air strike on General Staff headquarters in Vientiane. Nouphet would use his regiment to arrest Ouane and Bounthone. A second regiment would be airlifted from Savannakhet to Vientiane to arrest Kouprasith and Oudone if they survived the air strike, and to take charge of Vientiane.

Thao Ma confided his plan for launching a coup to the assistant air attaché at Savannakhet. At dawn on 21 October, the coup was launched. The assistant air attaché warned the Air Attaché in Vientiane of the impending attack on the capital. Kouprasith and Oudone fled RLA headquarters just prior to the bombing run. Nor was this the only obstacle to coup success. Colonel Bounleut Saycocie failed to bring the bribe fund from Vang Pao. Nouphet and his regiment failed to arrest Ouane and Bounthone. The regiment to be airlifted stood down under orders from a superior officer. However, eight AT-28s launched from Savannakhet and cut across the Kingdom of Thailand's air space to attack Vientiane. The Royal Thai Air Force alerted; they put interceptors in the air. All U.S. Air Force missions over Laos were momentarily cancelled by General William Momyer; they scrambled F-102 interceptors. At 0830 hours, even as Thao Ma radioed a communique that Ouane had been detained, the AT-28s struck a gun park, two munitions depots, the Royal Lao Army headquarters, and Kouprasith's villa. The gun park and a nearby communications center suffered at least 23 dead.

Thao Ma prepared to lead a second sortie. However, Ambassador William H. Sullivan, the British Ambassador, and Prince Boun Oum flew to Savannakhet and persuaded the RLAF general to withhold a second assault. At 2200 hours, the RLAF coup force manned AT-28 cockpits and loaded loyal technicians onto a C-47 transport. In Vientiane, power was cut to the entire city so that a night raid would have no aiming points. However, instead of striking again, the coup pilots flew into exile at Udorn. The Lao coup troops spent eight months imprisoned before being granted political asylum by the Thais. Thao Ma was sentenced in absentia to the death penalty.

== Aftermath ==
Thao Ma was that rarity among Lao generals, a fighting man. His departure was a severe blow to RLAF morale. The loss of ten pilots' services seriously curtailed RLAF operations. Sourith filled the RLAF commander's vacancy; he was responsive to Ouane.

Once assured of air transportation, Ouane contracted for the opium shipment that was the focus of the 1967 Opium War.
