= Field goal (disambiguation) =

A field goal is a means of scoring in gridiron football.

Field goal may also refer to:

== Sports ==
- Field goal (basketball), a scoring play in basketball normally worth two or three points
  - Three-point field goal, the three-point instance of the above
  - Four-point field goal, an uncommon variant of the above
- Field goal (rugby), an obsolete method of scoring in rugby football
  - Drop goal, a contemporary method of scoring in rugby football (also known as a field goal in Australia)

== Others ==
- Field Goal (video game), a 1979 arcade game
- Project Field Goal, part of Operation Millpond, a 1961 American covert operation during the Laotian Civil War

== See also ==
- Goal (sports), various scoring methods
