= Sourith Don Sasorith =

Laotian Army general

- Military career
- Allegiance: Kingdom of Laos
- Branch: Royal Lao Army; Royal Lao Air Force
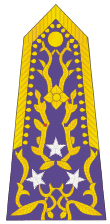
- Rank: Major general
- Conflicts: Laotian Civil War

Major general Sourith Don Sasorith was a Royal Lao Government commanding officer during the Laotian Civil War. Appointed to command the Royal Lao Air Force on two occasions, he was also entrusted two other times with command of a Military Region. At the war's end in 1975, Sourith Don Sasorith was condemned to a communist re-education camp.

== Background ==
The colonial army in the French Protectorate of Laos was one of Lao recruits and French officers and noncommissioned officers. Those few Lao promoted out of the ranks rose no further than command of a company. After the Kingdom of Laos gained its freedom in 1953, the few Lao with military experience were speedily promoted to much higher command positions than they were accustomed to. Many officers were also commissioned into the upper ranks from civilian life; they tended to gain their posts through family influence rather than training or ability. The few aristocratic families who dominated Lao society felt it advantageous to have family members or friends in the military command.

== Biography ==
Major general Sourith Don Sasorith was of Vietnamese-Lao heritage. He owed his appointment as a military officer to family connections; Katay Don Sasorith, his uncle, was the former prime minister of the Kingdom of Laos. Sourith commanded Bataillon Parachutistes 1 (Battalion of Parachutists 1) and Bataillon Parachutistes 2 (Battalion of Parachutists 2) of the Royal Lao Army. He also took command of the Lao National Aviation in January 1958. Despite its name, it consisted of only a single composite squadron of mixed types of aircraft. A French major had been in charge; however, the language barrier between French and Lao had hindered training, as had the low educational level of the Lao airmen. Sourith was appointed because he was strict on discipline. His aviation command was additional to that of the paratroopers. At the time, there was one Lao pilot trained, but 36 more still in training; Sourith was not one of them.

Later, Sourith went to France and learned to fly light aircraft, but never progressed any further as a pilot. He flew little, and shunned advice from his American backers in the Programs Evaluation Office concerning the Royal Lao Air Force after his return to Laos. On 23 May 1960, the communist Prince Souphanouvong and his supporters fled imprisonment by the Royal Lao Government; Sourith and two companies of his paratroopers unsuccessfully pursued them. When Captain Kong Le took over the kingdom for General Phoumi Nosavan three months later, Sourith supported Phoumi.

In the wake of the Battle of Vientiane, Kong Le retreated from combat with the Royal Lao Army to the Plain of Jars. Appointed to command of Military Region 2, Sourith commanded forces attempting to contain Kong Le's Forces Armee Neutraliste (Neutral Armed Forces, or FAN) on the Plain. His failure to do so saw him relieved of that command on 13 January 1961.

He would play a similar role following the Battle of Luang Namtha. On 8 May 1962, he joined the routed RLA troops that had just fled Luang Namtha for Ban Houayxay. Sourith ordered the local ammunition dump blown up to prevent its capture by communist troops. The already demoralized Royalist soldiers panicked; some of them fled further south, into the Kingdom of Thailand. The senior American military adviser from the U.S. Embassy, which was supporting the RLA, concluded that the Royalist army completely lacked the urge for combat. However, Sourith continued command of Military Region 1 despite the defeat.

Sourith was undergoing training at Fort Leavenworth, Kansas when a series of strategy meetings were held in Laos during April and May 1966. On 1 April, General Thao Ma was blamed for using the T-28 Trojans to strike the Ho Chi Minh Trail instead of supporting the RLA. His concentration on T-28 operations was blamed for neglect of airlift operations. These points were hashed over again at a 3 April conference. At a meeting on 21 April, General Ouane announced that Sourith would assume Thao Ma's assignment as soon as Sourith returned to Laos. On 11 May 1966, Prime Minister Souvanna Phouma informed U.S. Ambassador William H. Sullivan of the pending change. The ambassador appreciated Thao Ma as one of the few fighting generals in the RLA, and wanted to retain him. The following day, Sullivan negotiated a compromise that kept Thao Ma in command of the T-28s and moved his headquarters from his home ground of Savannakhet to Vientiane. At some point, Sourith was given command of the newly created Military Airlift section of RLAF C-47 transports. One source insists that happened as early as 4 June, while another names 27 September. In any case, when General Thao Ma failed in his 21 October 1966 coup, and fled into exile, Sourith became commander of the entire RLAF.

The air force was dispirited by the departure of their charismatic leader. Sourith inherited a splintered organization. The enlisted ground crew was poorly paid and resentful. The transport pilots grew rich off theft and smuggling. The T-28 pilots flew combat missions while the General Staff dithered about the military situation. Sourith brought in older French-trained field grade officers to replace American-trained junior officers; unlike their juniors, the field grade officers were not familiar with American procurement and logistics procedures. At the same time, losses suffered with supporting the ongoing siege at the Battle of Nam Bac ground down the RLAF's T-28 force. By the time Nam Bac fell on 14 January 1968, in what was referred to as "the largest military disaster in the history of Laos", the American air attaché had concluded that Sourith was a failure in his command.

By this time, Sourith's RLAF was flying fewer missions than at any time since Thao Ma's departure. The RLAF was broken into composite squadrons to be stationed at the kingdom's main airfields—Vientiane, Pakxe, Savannakhet, and Luang Prabang. Each squadron was placed at the disposal of its local Military Region commander. Sourith was left with little say over his command. He could not prevent misuse of the transports for profit. Indeed, on 21 March 1968, Sourith was involved in a smuggled C-47 shipment of opium and gold that was impounded in Saigon by Vietnamese customs officials.

During Operation Pigfat in late 1968, Sourith's RLAF gained its first Hmong pilots. The controversial addition of these flying hill tribesmen first took place at Vientiane. It was proposed to make them a separate squadron based in Military Region 2, closer to the fighting. Regardless of their stationing, the Hmong obeyed Vang Pao. Sourith was opposed to the idea of Hmong fighter pilots, but eventually capitulated to the proposal as a way of preventing ethnic tensions among his fliers.

Like other officers in the Lao high command, Sourith heard rumors that Thao Ma was going to return to Laos to overthrow the government. When Thao Ma actually returned to Laos on 20 August 1973, Sourith hid in his home, prepared if need be to change his allegiance to support the coup. He was found huddled under a table, and refused to emerge to deal with the coup because of the danger involved. After the coup was suppressed without his help via Thao Ma's execution, Sourith was relieved of command of the RLAF and transferred to the post of chief of logistics for the Royal Lao Armed Forces.

Major General Sourith was still serving in that capacity at the time the communists took power in Laos. In August 1975, Sourith Don Sasorith was imprisoned in a communist re-education camp in Xam Neua. He perished in the camp.
