= Thao Ma =

Laotian general and failed coup d'état leader (1931–1973)

- Born: 1931; Salavan, French protectorate of Laos, French Indochina
- Died: 1973 (aged 41–42); Vientiane, Kingdom of Laos
- Military career
- Allegiance: Kingdom of Laos
- Branch: Royal Lao Army; Royal Lao Air Force
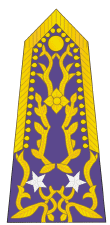
- Rank: Brigadier general
- Conflicts: First Indochina War; Laotian Civil War

Brigadier general Thao Ma (1931–1973) was a Laotian military and political figure of the Laotian Civil War and the Vietnam War (aka Second Indochina War). Thao Ma began his military career as a paratrooper in the French Union Army, when France administered the Kingdom of Laos. He switched to aviation, first as a transport pilot, then as a fighter-bomber pilot. From 1959 to 1966, Thao Ma was the commander of the Royal Lao Air Force (RLAF), and was noted for his charisma and aggressiveness. However, his dedication to soldierly virtues put him at odds with other Laotian generals who were involved in the drug trade. As a result, he made three futile attempts to seize control of the Laotian military and the Royal Lao Government. During the last of these attempted coups, in 1973, he was executed without trial at the age of 42.

== Early life ==
Thao Ma Manosith was born in 1931 at Salavan, in the French Protectorate of Laos, of mixed Laotian and Vietnamese heritage. He became a Laotian patriot, initially opposed to any foreign intervention in Laos. His views changed as he became involved in the battle for the Laotian independence.

== Aviation service 1955-1966 ==
Thao Ma's early training as an aviator took place under the French rule. A French military mission in Laos began training Laotian pilots in January 1955, with the aim of staffing the newly founded Laotian Aviation (French: Aviation Laotiènne), the air wing of the Laotian National Army (French: Armée Nationale du Laos – ANL). Thao Ma, already trained as a paratrooper in the ANL airborne forces, retrained as a transport pilot.

In 1959, Thao Ma was promoted to colonel and appointed commander of Laotian Aviation, which the following year became the Royal Lao Air Force (RLAF), with him remaining at its helm. At the same time, Col. Thao Ma continued to take advanced flight courses, which enabled him to master strike aircraft types such as the North American T-6G Texan, followed by the North American T-28D Trojan.

In 1964, as the air war in Laos intensified, Col. Thao Ma led the RLAF's T-28 attack squadron in the raids against the Ho Chi Minh trail and in support of Major general Vang Pao's SGU guerrilla forces in northeastern Laos. He devised an early version of the AC-47 gunship by using a few modified Douglas C-47 Skytrain transports as weapons platforms. He improvised removable machine-gun mounts to arm the transports with AN/M2 heavy machine-guns, and also had installed cargo rollers leading to the loading door; 250 lb bombs could be thus be rolled out the door while in-flight.

Although his personal involvement led to the rise of a high esprit de corps within the RLAF, Col. Thao Ma came into conflict with other Laotian generals, as his whole-hearted commitment of employing RLAF aircraft for military purposes stood in the way of their plans of using them for their own gold- and opium-smuggling operations. In February 1965, he refused to accept bribes from higher-ranking officers and categorically informed them that he would not allow his pilots to be coerced into drug smuggling. The generals' response was to move the RLAF headquarters from Wattay Air Base, near Vientiane, to Seno Air Base, near Savannakhet; most of the T-28 pilots stationed there were Thai mercenaries rather than Laotians. Later in the summer of 1965, a number of RLAF pilots were bribed to mutiny against their own commander. In response, Col. Thao Ma attempted a coup d'état on 4 June 1965.

By August 1965, the RLAF strike component had increased to 27 T-28s, with Thao Ma being promoted to brigadier-general. Brig. Gen. Thao Ma had not only successfully managed to increase the T-28s' combat sortie rate, but continued to personally fly many strike missions.

In the wake of the failed coup, Brig. Gen. Thao Ma was both pressured to allow the smuggling of drugs by the RLAF's C-47 transports and enticed with bribe offers. Despite the ongoing pressure, however, he remained intransigent. Finally, in May 1966 the Royal Lao Armed Forces (FAR) General Staff summoned Brig. Gen. Thao Ma from the RLAF headquarters at Seno Air Base to inform him they had detached the C-47 transport planes from RLAF Air Command and formed them into a separate command under Colonel Sourith Don Sasorith, himself also a former Army paratrooper. Brig. Gen. Thao Ma was also ordered to transfer his headquarters back to Vientiane, where he could be under the General Staff's watchful eye. Instead, he pleaded for a six-month grace period before relocating his headquarters to the capital city and fled to Luang Prabang. By now, he was fearful of assassination and was psychologically deteriorating under the stress. During the six-month grace period, he desperately sought alternatives to the ordered transfer, seeking unsuccessfully the intercession of King Savang Vatthana, of his American sponsors, and of his friend Captain Kong Le.

On 22 October 1966, Brig. Gen. Thao Ma attempted a coup via air strike when he personally led a flight of Laotian T-28 pilots loyal to him in a combat sortie directed at Vientiane. An attempt to kill the Deputy Commander-in-Chief of the Royal Lao Army (RLA), Major general Kouprasith Abhay, with rocket fire aimed at his home failed. Two ammunition dumps at Wattay Air Base outside the city were blown up, killing over 30 people on the ground and many more wounded.

As the coup attempt fell apart, the dissident T-28 pilots had no choice but to return to Seno Air Base. Brig. Gen. Thao Ma was then persuaded by American officials not to fly a followup strike. At 01:45 hours of 23 October, he and ten remaining loyal RLAF pilots took off from Seno and flew their T-28s into exile in Thailand. The loss of a third of its T-28 pilots was a serious setback for the RLAF.

== Return from exile, and death ==
On 20 August 1973, Thao Ma returned from exile in a motorized column carrying 60 adherents to stage another coup attempt. Once they quickly captured Wattay Air Base, he took a commandeered T-28, and he and his wingman attempted to again kill Maj. Gen. Kouprasith Abhay with a dive bombing raid on his brick villa in Vientiane, demolishing the building and killing his nephew. Thao Ma and six other pilots then flew their T-28s in a strike against the Royal Lao Army headquarters. However, Wattay Air Base was retaken by loyalist troops of the RLA while the air strikes were in progress. When Thao Ma's strike force returned to the airfield, a truck-mounted Browning M2HB .50 Cal Heavy machine-gun manned by a government soldier brought Thao Ma's T-28 down while he was attempting to land. He was hauled wounded from his crash-landed plane and taken to Kouprasith's headquarters in Vientiane. There Thao Ma was executed on Kouprasith's order. He was 42 years old.

== See also ==
- Major general Kouprasith Abhay
- Major general Ouane Rattikone
- Major general Phoumi Nosavan
- Brigadier general Siho Lamphouthacoul
- Colonel Bounleuth Saycocie
- Royal Lao Army Airborne
- Royal Lao Air Force
- Royal Lao Armed Forces
- Laotian Civil War
- Weapons of the Laotian Civil War
