= Bounleuth Saycocie =

Laotian Army colonel

- Born: 1 September 1931
- Died: 23 October 2014 (aged 83)
- Military career
- Allegiance: Kingdom of Laos
- Branch: Royal Lao Army
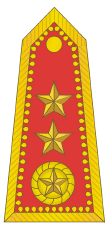
- Rank: Colonel
- Conflicts: Laotian Civil War

Colonel Bounleuth Saycocie (1 September 1931 – 23 October 2014) was a Lao military and political figure of the Second Indochina War and the Laotian Civil War.

== Early life ==
Bounleut Saycocie was born in the Hineboune District of Khammouane province and attended the Lycée Pavie in Vientiane, followed by the Lao Military Academy at Dong Hene in Savannakhet Province. He later attended staff courses at the French Army Staff School (École d'État-Major) in Paris and at the United States Army Command and General Staff College in Fort Leavenworth, Kansas.

== Career ==
From 1960 to 1962 he was promoted to lieutenant colonel and served as Military Attaché to the Royal Lao Embassy in Washington D.C. He was again promoted to colonel in 1962 and served as Chief of the Special Cabinet (Military Affairs) of the Ministry of Defense until 1964. From 1964 to 1966, he was appointed Chief Logistics Officer of the Royal Lao Army in Vientiane.

Col. Bounleut attempted a coup on 31 January 1965, with Phoumi Nosavan attempting his own coup at the same time. Both coups were crushed by Kouprasith Abhay by 3 February. Undaunted by his failure, Bounleut conspired with General Thao Ma to prepare for the 1966 Laotian coup. After the coup failed, Bounleut took refuge in Thailand where he remained until 1968, when he moved to France.

Along with Phoumi, he is said to have assisted in drafting the plan for Thao Ma's coup attempt in August 1973. Bounleut accompanied Thao Ma in the latter's seizure of Wattay Airbase on 20 August 1973. While Thao Ma commandeered aircraft, Bounleut drove an armored car into Vientiane to take over the radio station. At 07:00 hours, he broadcast a communiqué calling for the replacement of Prince Souvanna Phouma by Prince Boun Oum as Prime Minister of the Royal Lao Government. As the coup was suppressed, Bounleut stole a Cessna U-17 and returned to Thailand.

After the Lao People's Democratic Republic was established by the Pathet Lao in December 1975, Col. Bounleuth became a leader of the anti-communist political and military resistance against the communist Lao government and their Vietnamese mentors.

== Later life and death ==
Col. Bounleuth finally immigrated to the US in 2000 as a political refugee and settled in Minneapolis, Minnesota. He suffered a stroke a few years later that left him paralyzed and bed ridden until his death on 23 October 2014 at the age of 83.

== See also ==
- 1965 Laotian coups
- 1966 Laotian coup
- 1973 Laotian coup
- Brigadier general Thao Ty
- Brigadier general Thao Ma
- General Ouane Rattikone
- Major general Phoumi Nosavan
- Major general Vang Pao
- Royal Lao Armed Forces
- Laotian Civil War
