= Kong Le =

Laotian military officer (1934–2014)

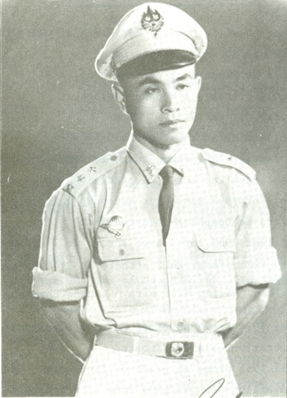
- Kong Le in 1954
- Born: 6 March 1934; French Indochina (present-day Laos)
- Died: 17 January 2014 (aged 79); Paris, France
- Military career
- Allegiance: Kingdom of Laos
- Branch: Royal Lao Army
- Service years: 1951–17 October 1966
- Rank: Captain (later self-proclaimed Major General)
- Commands: 2ème bataillon de parachutistes (Parachute Battalion 2); Forces Armées Neutralistes (Neutralist Armed Forces)
- Known for: De facto leader of the Kingdom of Laos; In office: 10 August 1960–16 December 1960; Predecessor: Phoumi Nosavan; Successor: Phoumi Nosavan
- Conflicts: Laotian Civil War; Battle of Vientiane; Battle of Lak Sao; Operation Triangle

Captain Kong Le (Lao: ກອງແລ; 6 March 1934 – 17 January 2014) was a Laotian military officer and prominent military figure in Laos during the 1960s.

He led the premier unit of the Royal Lao Army, the 2nd Parachute Battalion, that played a significant role during the first phases of the Laotian Civil War. The idealistic young American-trained officer became known worldwide when, on 10 August 1960, he and his mutinous paratroopers overthrew the Royal Lao Government in a coup d'état. Le declared that he aimed to end the government corruption; to the shock of American officials, he declared U.S. policies were responsible for the ongoing fraud.

Once ousted by the U.S.-backed 14 December 1960 countercoup by General Phoumi Nosavan, Kong Le and his fellow putschist officers retreated to the strategic Plain of Jars, gathering recruits to form a rebel group that would be known as the Neutral Armed Forces (FAN). However, this rebel group would begin to splinter as its members began to favor either the Communist or Royalist forces in the Laotian Civil War. In April 1963, the Patriotic Neutralists broke off to ally themselves with the communist Pathet Lao, while Kong Le engineered a rapprochement with the Royalists for FAN.

Over the next couple of years, FAN's battle performance in support of the Royalists was poor; especially striking was their inability to overcome a Vietnamese communist stronghold overlooking the FAN main base at Muang Soui's all-weather airfield. As Kong Le's subordinates became increasingly dissatisfied, and FAN units began to mutiny, he was forced to leave Laos on 17 October 1966.

He would remain in exile in Indonesia, Hong Kong, the United States, and France. He died in the latter on 17 January 2014.

== Early life and military career ==
Kong Le was born on 6 March 1934 to ethnic Lao Theung parents and spoke Phu Tai. He stood 1.57 m (5 ft 2 in) tall and was a slender but muscular man. His ethnic origin showed in his wide cheekbones and dark skin. He acquired an excellent command of French, as well as knowing functional English.

His father died in 1940, leaving his family destitute and forcing the then six-year-old Le to farm in a rice farm. He received a little formal education at the Savannakhet Lycee before enlisting in the Royal Lao Army in 1951. He showed enough martial promise to be included in the third Officer Candidate School class at Dong Hene. He graduated 19th in his class of 21. He was noted for his changeable temperament and rapid mood swings.

Kong Le's first assignment after OCS subordinated him to Captain Ouane Rattikone in Luang Prabang. In 1957, he underwent Scout Ranger training at Fort William McKinley, the Philippines. After returning to Laos, he was trained by Kopassus. Upon his return to Laos in 1958, he joined 2ème bataillon de parachutistes (Parachute Battalion 2) as its second in command. During his early paratroop service, he befriended two other officers who would become important in Laotian history, Vang Pao and Thao Ma.

== Coups ==
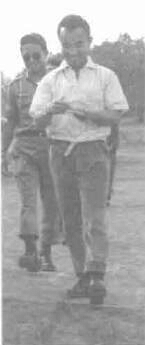
Le during the coup in 1960

In December 1959, Captain Kong Le was approached by his uncle-in-law, General Ouane Rattikone while the commanding officer of BP 2 was in the United States, leaving Kong Le in charge. On 25 December 1959, the term of the National Assembly expired. General Phoumi Nosavan convinced Kong Le of the necessity to fill the political vacuum. The 25 December coup in Vientiane succeeded without harming anyone. General Phoumi became the Minister of Defense and held actual power over the Royal Lao Government thanks to the captain.

Kong Le's unit, 2ème bataillon de parachutistes (Parachute Battalion 2), was considered the cream of the Royal Lao Army. As such, they were constantly deployed for a year, went unpaid for months at a time, and lacked time to even build themselves barracks for shelter. The paratroopers became mutinous. On 10 August 1960, Kong Le led the paras in a coup that saw only six killed. The same vital points were seized as in the 1959 coup, with the addition of the arrest of General Sounthone Pathammavong, the Chief of Staff, as Kong Le seized power for the second time.

Kong Le's aims in seizing the capital became apparent in his radio broadcasts:

What leads us to carry out this revolution is our desire to stop the bloody civil war; eliminate grasping public servants and military commanders ... whose property amounts to much more than their monthly salaries can afford. ... It is the Americans who have brought government officials and army commanders, and caused war and dissension in our country.

Phoumi Nosavan did not acquiesce. On 10 August, he flew to Bangkok. He solicited support from his first cousin, Field Marshal Sarit Thanarat, the dictator of the Kingdom of Thailand. Phoumi flew to Savannakhet to establish a headquarters and pull together a resistance movement in Savannakhet.

On 11 August, the Pathet Lao pledged their cooperation with Kong Le. The next four months of turmoil saw Kong Le struggle to maintain control over the Kingdom of Laos in the face of a burgeoning resistance. Kong Le convinced Souvanna Phouma to become Prime Minister in the new government; in turn, Souvanna appointed General Ouane commander in chief of the RLA. Lao commanding officers such as Generals Amkha Soukhavong, Kouprasith Abhay, Oudone Sananikone, and Sing Rattanasamy backed Kong Le with various levels of enthusiasm.

In early October, Vang Pao declared that Military Region 2's forces backed Phoumi. After the internecine struggle, Military Region 1 also remained in Phoumi's control. On 16 November, General Ouane flew to Savannakhet to join Phoumi. With Central Intelligence Agency financial backing, and aided by CIA-trained commandos, Phoumi's troops set forth at 0800 hours on 21 November 1960 to reclaim Vientiane.

== The Battle of Vientiane ==
On 13 December 1960, Phoumi's counter-coup column began his assault on Kong Le's paratroopers occupying Vientiane. For four days, the two sides shot at each other with crew-served weapons without closing for near-range combat. Although the two sides caused little harm to one another, about 600 homes burned, an estimated 600 civilians were killed, and downtown Vientiane was destroyed. On 16 December, Kong Le's forces withdrew northward toward the strategic Plain of Jars, leaving Phoumi once again in charge of Laos.

By 4 January 1961, Kong Le's forces—by now dubbed Forces Armées Neutralistes (Neutralist Armed Forces)—held the Plain of Jars from Muang Soui eastward along Route 7 (Laos) to the Vietnamese border. The Soviet supply airlift that had begun just before the fighting began in Vientiane continued to supply FAN. The People's Army of Vietnam supplied advisers to FAN; they also supplied advisers to beef up the Pathet Lao units supporting FAN. In the meantime, Phoumi's American backers struggled to find a covert source of airpower to oppose Kong Le, as the RLA ground forces proved incapable of dealing with FAN. Eventually, the Americans settled on supplying the Royal Lao Air Force with its first strike aircraft, four T-6 Texans, as well as forming the abortive Operation Millpond.

On 12 April 1962, Kong Le reached a rapprochement with Vang Pao; the guerrilla leader agreed to loan Kong Le security forces for guard duty. On 1 May 1962, the Pathet Lao proposed a truce. Fighting halted two days later. On 6 May, the International Control Commission originally established under the 1954 Geneva Agreements was revived to oversee peace efforts.

== Renewed conflict ==
By the time the International Agreement on the Neutrality of Laos agreed upon on 23 July 1962 came into effect, FAN had ramped up to a strength of 8,000 troops. Three battalions under Brigadier General Khoumane Boupha were occupying far northern Phongsali Province. There were two new infantry battalions outposted in Vang Vieng on Route 13, threatening Vientiane from the north. Three battalions moved southward into the panhandle to occupy Tchepone, Nhommarath, and Mahaxay. FAN's center of gravity on the Plain of Jars was four paratroop battalions and two artillery battalions. The new artillery battalions were not the only heavy weapons units added to FAN. An armored company of amphibious tanks formed from the 45 PT-76s passed on to FAN by the PAVN. There was also a small air arm, consisting of two C-47s and two Beavers flown north from Vientiane during the retreat to the Plain; in December 1962, they would be augmented by three Li-2s from the Soviet Union. To command all this, Kong Le promoted himself to Major General.

Meanwhile, Kong Le mended fences with the Royalists he had been opposing. In turn, on 6 April 1963, the Pathet Lao launched several simultaneous surprise attacks on Kong Le's forces on the Plain of Jars. Although FAN was driven from its positions, it evacuated most of its tanks and heavy weaponry to Muong Phanh. On 10 April 1963, President John F. Kennedy approved U.S. military aid supply drops to bolster FAN. On 12 April. Kong Le met with Vang Pao at Sam Thong. They agreed on cooperation between their forces; a contingent of Vang Pao's troops would don Neutralist uniforms and guard FAN headquarters, freeing Neutralists for combat duty. Hmong Royalist military irregulars also cratered Route 7, thus closing the main communist supply line. Then too, Hmong units would ambush Route 4 traffic behind communist lines, as well as harassing various of their units with hit-and-run raids. However, Kong Le's forces would suffer 85 killed, while the communists lost 71 dead.

However, this strength would soon be vitiated in April 1963, as a schism split the newly named Forces Armées Neutralistes (Neutral Armed Forces). As neutralists began to favor either communists or royalists, there were several political assassinations among officers favoring either persuasion. Colonel Deuane Sunnalath and Brigadier General Khamouane Boupha tolled away four neutralist infantry battalions, as well as an artillery battalion, to form the Patriotic Neutralists. The Patriotic Neutralists allied themselves with the Pathet Lao. In the southern panhandle, the majority of 4ème bataillon d'infanterie (Infantry Battalion 4) defected to the new movement. As the breakaway Patriotic Neutralists had allied themselves with the communists, Route 9 from Khe Sanh, Vietnam to Xepon, Laos was now open for North Vietnamese invaders.

May 1963 saw Kong Le in a quandary. The answer to dissent in his ranks could be a renewed offensive; to remain quiescent would risk dissolution of FAN. However, a new assault on the communists might evoke an overwhelming counterattack by PAVN. As it turned out, his newly acquired American advisor counseled against aggression, and a planned FAN attack never came off. Meanwhile, Hmong forces continued to interdict communist supply lines as a means of relieving communist pressure on FAN.

Nor were heavy casualties and the Patriotic Neutralist desertion the only diminutions of Kong Le's forces. FAN's dismal performance in the Battle of Lak Sao ended in January 1964 with whipped FAN units giving up their presence in Military Region 3 when they were withdrawn to the Plain of Jars. Further defeats in early 1964, followed by the April coup in Vientiane sparked further discontent within FAN's ranks; there were further defections to the pro-communist Patriotic Neutralists. By the time Operation Triangle came around, FAN had to be reinforced by Thai mercenary artillerymen. The fighting in Operation Triangle ended in late July 1964 with FAN's failure to conquer the Vietnamese stronghold overlooking the FAN base at Muang Soui. In December 1964, another FAN offensive on the communist-held high ground planned to take advantage of the morale boost elicited by Kong Le's leadership. During this attack, communist tanks killed 12 FAN troopers and wounded 68. By the 10th, the repelled Neutralists were back at their starting point of Muang Soui. Kong Le, who had sat out the assault by serving as a Buddhist monk, fired the attack's commander for embezzling 1.5 million Lao kips.

By February 1965, Kong Le was locked in conflict with his battalion commanders over the unsuccessful operations against Phou Khout and squabbles about promotions and money. Nearby FAN 5ème bataillon d'infanterie (Infantry Battalion 5) at Moung Hiem, commanded by Souvanna Phouma's nephew, co-existed pacifically with nearby PAVN units. However, on 11 March 1965, the Vietnamese unexpectedly overran the battalion and executed its three senior officers.

== The search abroad ==
Personal standard of General Kong Le, pre-1975 as the flag of the Lao Neutralist Movement.

In April 1965, Kong Le flew to Jakarta, Indonesia seeking additional military aid for his army. As a result, on 21 August 1965, an Indonesian C-130 landed at Wattay International Airport with seven tons of uniforms and other military equipment for FAN. It departed, carrying 68 of FAN's lower-ranking officers for extended training in Indonesia. A second flight followed suit two days later. This arrangement perturbed the Americans, who were suspicious of the Indonesian government's left-leaning politics. Their supply efforts to date had maintained FAN at a static level. They now upgraded FAN weaponry and improved the runway at Muang Soui. In October, Kong Le toured the United States for a month, receiving military honors at Fort Myer, Virginia. Upon returning to Laos, FAN made another unsuccessful assault on the communist ridgeline strongpoint overlooking Muang Soui. Kong Le sat out the action while serving as a Buddhist monk.

In January 1966, 14ème bataillon d'infanterie (Infantry Battalion 14) mutinied in protest against Kong Le's lack of leadership. Kong Le's reply was another attack on Phou Khout on 20 February. Lacking air support, it failed. Ongoing attacks throughout March, although supported by air raids using napalm, did no better. 8ème bataillon d'infanterie (Infantry Battalion 8) then mutinied on 30 March 1966, walking off the battlefield. 2ème bataillon spécial de commandos (Special Commando Battalion 2) nearly joined them. On 1 April, during a Royalist General Staff meeting, Kong Le gave a lengthy lecture on the necessity of requesting mercenary troops from Indonesia. In turn, he was told by Souvanna Phouma that his FAN battalions would be sequentially withdrawn for retraining in Lop Buri, Thailand, before being placed under the command of Royalist Military Region commanders. In August 1966, BI 8's new commanding officer launched them in another unsuccessful assault against his foe's overwatch positions. By now, Kong Le had lost the support of most of his subordinate officers. His interest in a French intelligence officer's daughters did not help matters. Three of his subordinates divided up command of FAN and forced him into exile. Kong Le sought asylum in the Indonesian embassy in Vientiane. On 17 October 1966, he left Laos.

In March 1967, Kong Le left Indonesia to Hong Kong. In June, he left there for France. Once in France, he began plotting a return to Laos.

In the mid-1980s, Kong Le spent two years in Meng La, China in a futile attempt to spark an invasion of his native country.

In the late 1980s and part of the 1990s, Kong Le lived in the United States. He then lived in exile in Paris until he died in January 2014.

== See also ==
- Ban Phou Pheung Noi
- First Indochina War
- Laotian Civil War
- List of weapons of the Laotian Civil War
- Royal Lao Army
- Royal Lao Army Airborne
- Royal Lao Armed Forces
