= Ouane Rattikone =

Laotian military commander (1912–1978)

- Born: 1912; Luang Prabang, Laos, French Indochina
- Died: October 1978 (aged 65–66)
- Military career
- Allegiance: Kingdom of Laos
- Branch: Royal Lao Army
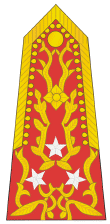
- Rank: Major general
- Conflicts: First Indochina War; Laotian Civil War

Major general Ouane Rattikone (Ouan Rathikoun), a Laotian senior military officer, was the commander-in-chief of the Royal Lao Armed Forces (French: Forces Armées du Royaume – FAR), the official military of the Royal Lao Government and the Kingdom of Laos, during the 1960s. He was born in 1912 in Luang Prabang.

An ally of the United States during the Vietnam War, Ouane developed a close relationship with William H. Sullivan, the U.S. ambassador to Laos, and Ted Shackley, the CIA station chief in Vientiane. Despite the intense conflicts amongst the FAR regional commanders, Ouane was pivotal in providing local military support against the North Vietnamese Army (NVA) and the Pathet Lao in the northern regions of Laos.

Ouane was also heavily involved in the opium trade throughout Southeast Asia. Despite widespread conspiracy theories of CIA complicity in drug trafficking, an investigation by the U.S. Senate found no evidence of CIA involvement. In his memoirs, Shackley unapologetically stated that the CIA essentially turned a blind eye to the drug trafficking because their resources were already being sapped by the war in neighboring Vietnam. He is believed to have died in October 1978.

== See also ==
- 1967 Opium War
- Thao Ty
- Thao Ma
- Phoumi Nosavan
- Vang Pao
- Royal Lao Armed Forces
- Laotian Civil War
- Colonel Bounleuth Saycocie
