= 1967 Opium War =

1967 conflict in Laos

- Part of Laotian Civil War
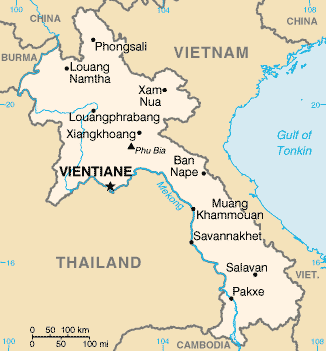
- Fighting took place close to the border of Laos, Burma and China
| Date | 29 July – 1 August 1967 |
| Location | Northwestern Laos |
| Result | Victory for General Ouane Rattikone and attention from the battle forced the Thai government to crack down on the Chinese. Khun Sa was defeated and his army dispersed. |

Belligerents
| Shan United Revolutionary Army | (Taiwan) Republic of China | Kingdom of Laos |

Commanders and leaders
| Warlord Khun Sa | Li Wen-huan; Tuan Hsi-wen | Ouane Rattikone |

Units involved
| Mule train and protection from SURA | ROCA 3rd Army and 5th Army | Two RLA infantry battalions; 2nd Paratroop Battalion |

Strength
| 800 men | 700–1,000 men | 900–2,500 men; Six AT-28s |

Casualties and losses
| 82 KIA | 70 KIA | Unknown |

The 1967 Opium War took place in northwestern Laos between February and August 1967; actual fighting took place from 29 July to 1 August 1967. A mule train, led by Burmese militia, carrying 16 tons of opium crossed into Laos to Ban Khwan, where they were attacked by rival drug smugglers from the Chinese Nationalists' Third and Fifth Armies. The intended recipient of the shipment, Royal Lao Army General Ouane Rattikone, bombed both sides while moving in troops to sweep the battlefield. With both Burmese militia and Kuomintang (KMT) Army defeated and expelled from Laos, the Lao general confiscated the opium for himself.

With this supply of raw opium base, plus his greater grasp on the drug trade, Ouane's refineries began to ship their heroin worldwide. He also supplied this injectable heroin to his allies – U.S. troops in the Vietnam War.

== Background ==
As World War II ended, the French found themselves embroiled in the First Indochina War. On 23 December 1950, the United States signed the Pentalateral Treaty with France, Cambodia, Laos, and Vietnam binding them to financially support the French effort. From that point onwards, the U.S. would fund an ever greater proportion of the French war effort; by 1952, it was funding about a third of the French budget for the war. Beginning as early as 6 May 1953, the U.S. Central Intelligence Agency (CIA) used its proprietary airline, Civil Air Transport, for combat supply drops in support of the French Army in Laos. Following the North Vietnamese 1953 invasion of Laos and the French defeat at Dien Bien Phu, the independence of the Kingdom of Laos was confirmed by international treaty on 20 July 1954. In December 1955, the secretive Programs Evaluation Office was established in the American embassy in Vientiane, Laos, to help the Royal Lao Government battle the communist insurgency.

The CIA was the lead American agency in the American penetration of Laos that resulted in the Laotian Civil War. One of its agents, William Young, was a missionary's son recruited for his cultural understanding of hill tribes in northwestern Laos. He founded a base for a guerrilla force at Nam Yu, near the triple border junction of China, Burma, and Laos.

Marooned in the vicinity were the remnants of the Nationalist Chinese Army loyal to the Kuomintang (KMT) that had been stranded there when the Chinese Civil War ended in a communist victory. Although Young recruited some of the Nationalist Chinese soldiers into the Royal Lao Army's 101st Special Battalion (French: Bataillon Especiale 101 – BE 101), many others became involved in the opium trade. Although they were funded by the Republic of China for intelligence activities and espionage, their money was cut off in 1961. When the KMT generals shifted to opium trading, they claimed it as a necessity to fund their armies. In short order, the KMT troops soon controlled 90 percent of the Burmese opium. Still maintaining their military capabilities, including a radio net for communications and weaponry that included crew-served weapons such as .50 caliber machine guns and 75mm recoilless rifles, the KMT would move caravans of 100 to 600 pack mules loaded with raw opium without interference. Their largest shipments contained nearly 20 tons of raw opium. They charged a "transit tax" on the opium they handled or protected.

== Opium train ==
In February 1967, Shan Burmese warlord Khun Sa declared he was entitled to a "transit tax" from KMT opium shipments moving through the Wa State of Burma; the KMT had already claimed the prerogative of similarly extorting a fee of nine dollars per kilo for opium to cross the Burmese border into Thailand or Laos. Khun Sa's proclamation served as a declaration of war. He had his agents buy and gather 16 tons of opium from Wa and Kokang states for his mule train to transport from Ving Ngun, Burma into nearby northwestern Laos. There he would sell this record-setting $500,000 shipment to General Ouane Rattikone, the Royal Lao Army commander of that region of Laos. The caravan of hundreds of pack mules was escorted by 800 men from Khun Sa's army. They had a 200-mile trek from Burma to Ban Khwan in the Kingdom of Laos. Ouane's drug refinery was there. News of this double challenge to the KMT drug trade spread through their radio net. They monitored the Shan caravan's progress. It was obvious that if Khun Sa succeeded with the sale, he could arm an additional 1,000 troops for his army with the proceeds, achieving armed parity with the KMT.

The remnants of the Kuomintang Third and Fifth Armies that existed on the Thai border with Burma were the ones customarily paid off to allow passage of opium. Khun Sa elected to ignore their charge for the border crossing. Consequently, his opium train was hotly pursued by between 700 and 1,000 Nationalist Chinese soldiers, who wanted either their payoff or the opium. They made their first attack as the caravan departed Kengtung. Khun Sa's rear guard drove off the attackers. On 14 and 15 July, the mile-long mule train crossed the Mekong River into Laos. Marching south from Muong Mounge, they reached Ban Khwan two days later.

Once there, they moved into defensive positions in Ouane's sawmill. Located on a sand spit jutting into the river, the mill was only approachable by land through its boggy lumberyard. The Burmese barricaded themselves in behind the unmilled logs. As this was occurring, the local school principal had carried word of the invasion to the nearest RLA post at Ton Peung. In turn, they advised the principal that for safety's sake, the villagers should evacuate themselves across the river into Thailand. The Lao soldiers also radioed in a report on the incursion.

The Chinese pursuit crossed the Mekong in the path of the fleeing Burmese on 24 July 1967, and marched south to Ban Khwan. After a preliminary skirmish, negotiations in the empty village began between the parties, with no result. A helicopter flew in from Ban Houayxay carrying the provincial RLA commander. He bore a message from General Ouane; both sides should get out of Laos. In return, Khun Sa's men received orders from him via radio to remain on station. The Nationalist Chinese demanded $250,000 as the price for their departure. A firefight between the Burmese and the Chinese followed on 29 July, using small arms, .50 caliber machine guns, 60mm mortars, and 57mm recoilless rifles. The following day at noon, as the fighting continued, six AT-28s of the Royal Lao Air Force bombed the battlefield. Unbeknown to the combatants, the Lao general had also received permission from Lao Prime Minister Souvanna Phouma to fly the 2nd Paratroop Battalion to Ban Houayxay. From there they marched northward to block the southern exit from the battlefield. On the north side of Ban Khwan, a couple of RLA infantry battalions marched southward to block that egress. Two river patrol launches were sent to contest any crossing of the Mekong. As this occurred, the AT-28s from Luang Prabang struck four or five times daily for two days running, bombing both sides indiscriminately, men and mules alike.

The 400 surviving Burmese muleteers and guards deserted their position in the face of the bombing and fled cross-river via boat back to Burma, leaving most of the opium cargo, their 82 dead, and 15 dead mules.

The Nationalist Chinese had suffered 70 killed in action. Abandoning their dead, 24 machine guns, and their dead mules, they also fled the bombing, headed north up the Lao bank of the Mekong towards Burma because they lacked boats for a river crossing. Ten kilometers upon their way, they were blocked by the RLA infantry troops. A fortnight's impasse ensued, during which additional Lao troops flown in from Vientiane helped encircle the outnumbered KMT. The dispute was settled when Ouane struck a deal with the leaders of the caravan. According to one account, he would pay them only the customary transportation fees for the opium. Another version says that the Chinese paid $7,500 to Rattikone as a departure fee. Either way, essentially the Lao general gained an enormous amount of free opium when his paratroopers gathered it from the battlefield and shipped it to Ban Houei Sai. Ouane had had his sawmill bombarded, and his heroin refinery had burnt down during the fighting. However, he reputedly still had five more refineries working nearby. Ouane's damages were far outweighed by his gains.

On 19 August, the 700 remaining KMT crossed the Mekong to land in Chiang Saen, Thailand. They resisted being disarmed by the Royal Thai Army. They returned to their bases at Mae Salong and Tham Ngop.

== Aftermath ==
The resultant embarrassing bad publicity from the opium war brought on a Thai crackdown on all the Kuomintang remaining on their northern border. Prior to the 1967 Opium War, the Thais and KMT had preserved a fiction that the Chinese were civilian refugees seeking asylum. After the Chinese exposure caused by the battle at Ban Khwan, the Royal Thai Army began strictly supervising the Kuomintang units, insisting that their commanders be accountable for their troops. Eventually, the Thais would quietly legitimise the KMT as paramilitary units. The KMT's revenue from the opium trade was much diminished; their 15-year control of the smuggling routes, collecting their "transit tax", had ended with the fighting at Ban Khwan.

On the other hand, Khun Sa's bid for supremacy in opium dealing had come to naught. He had lost his $500,000 investment; his army had been defeated and humiliated. His troopers began to quit him; by late 1968, more than half of his 2,000 man army had deserted. When he tried to ally himself with Shan insurgents, Burmese military intelligence put him in jail. However, when Khun Sa retired in 1971, he was still wealthy.

With his initial huge haul of confiscated opium, and his newly won control of opium traffic into Laos, General Ouane improved his refineries. At the time of the 1967 Opium War, they were turning out morphine base; some of that was further refined into crude but smokeable Number 3 Globe heroin. Within two years of the war, highly refined injectable Number 4 Globe heroin was being produced. Ouane's product now spread beyond its prior Asian market, to be smuggled into and sold in the United States and Europe. Not least among his markets was disaffected American troops in Vietnam.

== See also ==
- First Opium War
- Second Opium War
- Campaign at the China–Burma border
- Laotian Civil War
