= Palace Dog =

United States Air Force Covert Operation

Palace Dog was a United States Air Force covert operation to support the Royal Laotian Government in its military operations during the Laotian Civil War portion of the Vietnam War. Palace Dog, Project 404, and the Raven FACs principal task was the supply of forward air controllers for close air support to the Royal Lao Army (RLA).

== Background for Palace Dog ==
The Geneva Accords of 1962 had established the neutrality of Laos; the United States and the Democratic Republic of Vietnam were both signatories. The United States honored its agreement and removed its military personnel from Laos. However, Prince Souvanna Phouma, Prime Minister of the Kingdom of Laos, requested military assistance from the United States when the North Vietnamese violated the Geneva Accords by not terminating their invasion of Laos by removing their troops. The United States Air Force response was twofold: Operation Barrel Roll, air strikes from outside Laos; and air control specialists, who would operate inside Laos.

The immediate response was the dispatch of four United States Air Force sergeants from Combat Control Teams; these men were specifically trained to direct tactical air strikes. They surrendered their military identification and entered the country in civilian clothing—a process known as "sheepdipping". The North Vietnamese equivalent was bland denial that it had any troops in Laos. The mutual denials led to the fighting in Laos being dubbed "The Secret War."

Operating under the radio call sign "Butterfly", the air control sergeants flew as observers with Air America pilots to mark enemy targets for air attack by USAF aircraft. They marked the targets by dropping smoke grenades on them.

This effort, which increased to six sergeants, ran from 1963 until 1966, when General William Momyer terminated it on the grounds that non-rated men were not qualified for the task, despite their having done so quite successfully for three years.

== Establishment of Palace Dog/Project 404 ==
When the Butterfly program was canceled, it was replaced by Palace Dog. With the upgrade in personnel to using qualified fighter pilots with their own aircraft to mark targets, it became obvious that support personnel were needed within Laos. Palace Dog had two components: Raven FACs and Project 404. Project 404 was the program that supplied the support personnel for the fighter pilots who flew under the Raven call sign. Its stated objective was "to maintain the RLAF (Royal Laotian Air Force) Air Operations Center in fighting condition for the defense of Laos".

Beginning unofficially in 1966 at the cessation of the Butterfly program, and officially in October 1968, United States Air Force Special Operating Force staffed Project 404 by forwarding "sheepdipped" specialists to the United States Embassy in Laos. There they worked for the Air Attaché; he in turn worked directly for the American ambassador in Vientiane, Laos. The specialists escaped the scrutiny of permanent change of station orders by being assigned on 179-day Temporary Duty assignments. Specialties assigned were Air Operations Commander, Line Chief, and Medical and Communications Specialists. There was also a single doctor assigned to the program.

Four Air Operations Centers were established, one at each of the RLAF's airfields, which in turn were located one in each military region of Laos. The AOCs were located and designated respectively at Vientiane's Wattay Field (Lima Site 08), Pakse (Lima Site 11), Savannakhet (Lima Site 39), and Luang Prabang (Lima Site 54). Approximately June 1969, a fifth AOC located at Long Tieng (Lima Site 20A) was added. An advisor to the RLAF AC-47 gunship program was added in October 1970. This latter location supported the Hmong forces of General Vang Pao which would grow into the largest covert operation in history.

All of these locations except Vientiane were completely surrounded by both the North Vietnamese and Pathet Lao enemies of the Royal Lao Government.

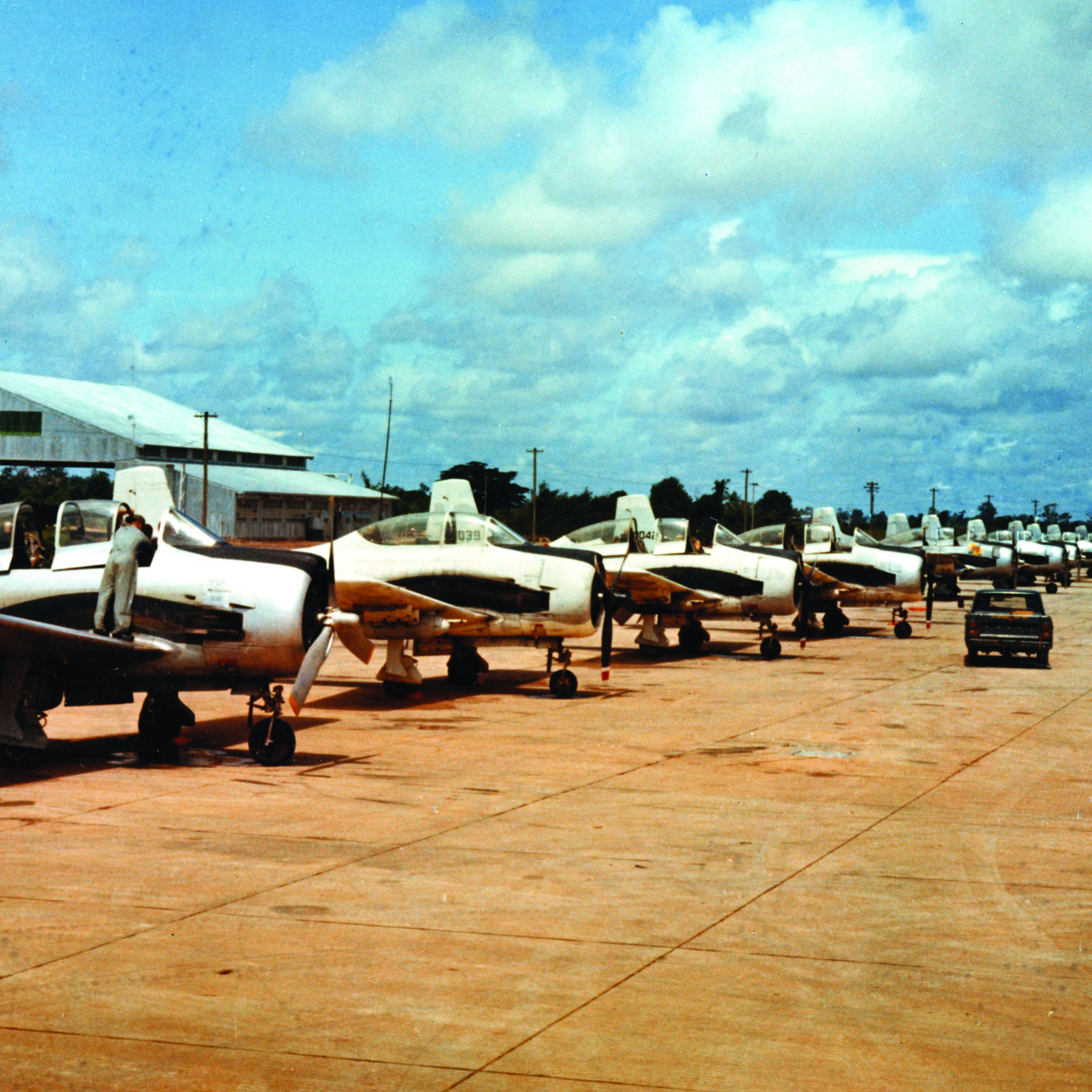
North American T-28Ds in Laos.

As Palace Dog grew to about 120 men stationed in Laos, with a maximum of 22 being Ravens, there were about 100 engaged in Project 404. Official documents account for only 21 of that count (see above). It stands to reason there was also a headquarters section of some sort. There were also additional specialists unlisted in official documents but verified by participants. Even though the T-28 Trojan trainers used as strike aircraft by the RLAF were low-tech, they still required engine, airframe, and avionics maintenance, as well as ordnance support. Additional specialists at the AOCs included a crew chief, an engine man, and a weapons/ordnance man.

An Air Operations Center, then, consisted of a commanding officer, Raven FACs, a line chief, a crew chief, an engine man, a weapons/ordnance man, a medic, and a communication specialist (radio man).

The end result of Palace Dog was a unique chapter in warfare, in which a guerrilla force was supported by an air force stationed largely behind enemy lines.

Palace Dog ended with the ceasefire ending the fighting in Laos, which took effect 22 February 1973.
