= Royal Lao Air Force =

Air Force of the Kingdom of Laos from 1955 to 1975

- Aviation royale laotiènne ກອງທັບອາກາສຣາຊອານາຈັກລາວ
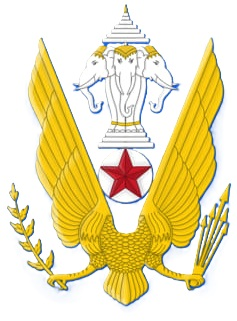
- Royal Lao Air Force emblem (1955–1975)
- Active: 28 January 1955 – 2 December 1975
- Country: Kingdom of Laos
- Allegiance: Royal Lao Government; HM The King of Laos
- Type: Air force
- Role: Aerial reconnaissance Aerial warfare Air assault Airdrop; Airlift; Close air support Counter-insurgency; Electronic warfare Fire support Tactical bombing
- Size: 2,300 personnel (at height); 180 aircraft (at height)
- Part of: Royal Lao Armed Forces
- Headquarters: Wattay Air Base, Vientiane; Seno Air Base, Savannakhet
- Nickname: RLAF (AVRL in French)
- Motto: "Air Squadron of the Sky Cobras"
- Colors: Blue
- Anniversaries: 28 January (RLAF Day)
- Engagements: Laotian Civil War

Commanders
- Notable commanders: Thao Ma; Sourith Don Sasorith; Bouathong Phothivongsa

Insignia
- Roundel

- Fin Flash

Aircraft flown
- Attack: T-6, T-28, AC-47
- Electronic warfare: EC-47D
- Reconnaissance: MS 500 Criquet, O-1 Bird Dog, U-6 (L-20), U-17
- Trainer: T-6, T-28, T-41
- Transport: Aero Commander 560, De Havilland Dove, Lisunov Li-2, C-47, C-123K, Alouette II, Alouette III, H-19, H-34, UH-1, Mil Mi-4

The Royal Lao Air Force (Lao: ກອງທັບອາກາສຣາຊອານາຈັກລາວ; French: Aviation Royale Laotiènne – AVRL), best known to the Americans by its English acronym RLAF, was the air force component of the Royal Lao Armed Forces (FAR), the official military of the Royal Lao Government and the Kingdom of Laos during the Laotian Civil War between 1960 and 1975.

The original Lao military aviation establishment was the Laotian Aviation (Aviation laotiènne), established by the French on 28 January 1955 as a small aerial observation and transport arm of the then National Lao Army (ANL). As the French withdrew from Indochina, the Lao Aviation was supported by American aid. With the addition of offensive capabilities, it morphed into the Royal Lao Air Force (RLAF).

The RLAF struggled into existence in the face of its enemies, while dealing with its own internal divisions as well as bucking a tide of pilot and aircraft losses. As it expanded from its 1960 foundation, and as the fighting power of the Royal Lao Army was diminished and broken during the 1960s, the RLAF came to carry the weight of the battle against Vietnamese communist invaders and local Pathet Lao insurgents. Despite its continual drain of heavy pilot and aircraft losses, the RLAF grew to the point where it flew 30,000 combat sorties annually against its enemies in the years 1970 through 1972, as well performing essential logistics duties.

The RLAF began its operations as a liaison, logistics and transport unit. Its initial stock were a melange of French and American supplied rotary-wing and fixed-wing aircraft inherited from its predecessor, Aviation Laotienne. On 9 January 1961, the new RLAF was supplied with six AT-6 Texans as its first strike aircraft. Although these were quickly lost, they were replaced by five T-28 Trojans. Despite ongoing losses, the T-28 inventory would eventually burgeon under American auspices to 75 Trojans on board in 1973. It would also acquire ten AC-47 gunships for a time. Pilot procurement for the swelling fleet would always be problematic, with the inadequate roster of Lao and Hmong pilots being filled out with Thai mercenary pilots, and a few Americans from Air America. By the time American aid was withdrawn in 1973, dooming the force, the RLAF would total 180 aircraft, both fixed wing and helicopters.

== Structure ==
The RLAF, along with the Royal Lao Navy, and the Royal Lao Army, was placed under the control of the Ministry of Defense in Vientiane. The RLAF received assistance over the years from France, the US and Thailand. Initially a transport organisation beginning operations with the Morane-Saulnier MS.500 Criquet and then the C-47, it acquired a light strike capability with the North American T-6 Texan and later the T-28 Trojan.

== List of U. S. Ambassadors to Laos during the Laotian Civil War ==
On 29 May 1961, President John F. Kennedy issued a directive letter to the United States Ambassador to Laos Leonard S. Unger granting Unger the authority to control "...all the functions of a Military Assistance Advisory Group...". The serving ambassador thus became a de facto commander of the Royal Lao Air Force during the Laotian Civil War; it existed only through U. S. support from 1962 through 1975.

- Leonard S. Unger (25 July 1962 – 1 December 1964)
- William H. Sullivan (23 December 1964 – 18 March 1969)
- G. McMurtrie Godley (24 July 1969 – 23 April 1973)
- Charles S. Whitehouse (20 September 1973 – 12 April 1975)

== List of Aviation Laotienne and RLAF Commanders ==
- Brigadier general Sourith Don Sasorith (1957–1959)
- Brigadier general Thao Ma (1959–1966)
- Major general Sourith Don Sasorith (1966–1973)
- Brigadier general Bouathong Phothivongsa (1973–1975)

=== Air Commanders ===
- Lieutenant colonel Lee Lue – Wing Leader of the Hmong T-28 fighter-bomber special squadron (1967–1969)
- Major Vang Sue – Wing Leader of the Hmong T-28 fighter-bomber special squadron (1969–1972)

== History ==
=== French beginning ===
Plans to create an air wing for the Laotian National Army (ANL) were first laid by the French in May 1954. Proposed equipment consisted of French Morane-Saulnier MS.500 Criquets, de Havilland Canada DHC-2 Beavers, helicopters, as well as Douglas C-47 transports. On 6 August 1954, as Laos became independent, the departing French military lent Criquets to the ANL for artillery observation. The treaty of independence granted France the right to maintain a military training mission in Laos. Beginning on 28 January 1955, the military mission provided a staff of instructors headed by a colonel to train 200 Laotian military personnel in air operations; that same day, the Laotian Aviation (Aviation Laotiénne) was officially founded at Wattay Airfield, near Vientiane. Its initial unit was the 1st Observation and Liaison Squadron, which served a double purpose as its Criquets were used for training Lao pilots, as well as ongoing military duties. By February 1955, it was equipped with ten Criquets delivered by the French.

Other than Wattay, available landing strips in the country consisted of rough runways at Xieng Khouang, Luang Prabang, Pakse, and the Plain of Jars. The French Air Force bequeathed four C-47s with French aircrews to the RLAF; three were repainted in RLAF insignia. The loan was conditional upon aircraft remaining in-country.

Some 6,500 Royal Lao Army troops out of its 30,000 personnel were surrounded by North Vietnamese and Pathet Lao forces. Because Laos lacked a functional road network, the RLAF's first mission was aerial resupply of these besieged troops. The French air crews operated the transports while Laotians were being trained. The first aggressive action by the new air force was the aerial movement of Royalist troops to the Plaine de Jarres in early 1955. These Royalist ground troops on the Plaine de Jarres became part of the air bridge resupply effort. In late 1955, 22 Lao students departed to France and Morocco for aviation training. One of these cadets was Thao Ma, an ex-paratrooper who later rose to command the Royal Lao Air Force.

The French-crewed C-47s were used for this operation, in conjunction with C-46 Commandos leased from Civil Air Transport. "Civilian" C-47s under contract were used to drop the Royalist Paratroop Battalion in Xieng Khouang to counter Pathet Lao expansion into the province. As part of this action, Lao pilots in training flew reconnaissance missions in the Criquets. The four Sikorsky H-19 helicopters of the new air force were insufficient for such duties as medevacing the ill and wounded, so two additional H-19s were acquired from the Royal Thai Air Force in October 1955. These were supplied without markings, and were officially Thai Airways craft.

French military intelligence had set up anticommunist guerrilla units throughout northern Laos, up to and over the North Vietnamese border. However, the loaner transports were not used for logistical support of the units in North Vietnam because they were not allowed to fly internationally. Instead, the "special missions" were entrusted to two private charter airlines flying under contract to the Lao military–Laos Air Lines and Lao Air Transport.

In late 1956, the C-47 transports were crewed by newly trained Lao. In 1957, the last 85 French instructors left Laos. By the time of their departure, most of the Lao aircraft were grounded due to lack of maintenance.

=== American takeover ===
The United States of America took up the slack as the French departed, setting up the Programs Evaluation Office as a sub rosa military mission in January 1954. It supplied 100 instructors to replace the departing French mentors. It also supplied six C-47s, two DHC L-20s, and two L-19 Bird Dogs. They also began airfield construction throughout the country.

In January 1956, PEO turned over four C-47s to the Lao, in the first direct U. S. support of the fledgling air force. The PEO's three-year development plan for Aviation Laotienne called for a transport squadron of eight C-47s, an observation squadron of 12 L-19 Bird Dogs, and a liaison squadron containing four Sikorsky H-19s and four DHC L-20 Beavers. A light strike force of twelve AT-6 Texans was also envisioned. The first six Bird Dogs arrived in March 1956, even as the last of the Criquets were scrapped.

A few more DHC L-20s were delivered in 1957; its short takeoff and landing capabilities well suited it for the primitive conditions of Laotian airstrips. One or more of these L-20s arrived with a .50 caliber machine gun still mounted; the natural use for such an armed craft was as a gunship for strafing ground targets. Also in 1957, Sourith Don Sasorith, the first Lao commander was appointed to head the Aviation Laotienne.

In July 1958, a coup brought Phoumi Nosavan to power in Laos; he subsequently requested additional aid from the United States. By the following year, PEO planned to reinforce the Lao air force with six North American T-28 Trojans. It also became apparent that the aviation support available for the Royalist government's war against the Communists was insufficient, even when augmented by Air America contract flights. The U.S. Air Force 315th Air Division sent a detachment incountry dressed in civilian clothing on a month's temporary duty to operate C-119G Flying Boxcars, C-123 Providers, and C-130 Hercules transports in support of the Royalists. After they flew 72 sorties, they were withdrawn on 27 April 1959 because of international political pressure.

Two French Alouette helicopters were purchased for the Lao air force in 1960. In August, Kong Le's Neutralist paratroopers launched a coup to unseat Nosavan; once he gained power, he requested aid from North Vietnam and the Soviet Union. Three months later, Nosavan launched an American-backed countercoup from his base in Savannakhet, successfully attacking the Neutralists in Vientiane. Nosavan received aerial logistical support not only from the diminished Lao air force, but from Royal Thai Air Force H-19s and four Air American H-34s, as well as a Bird & Son C-46. In addition to logistical support from these craft, Bird and Son dropped paratroopers onto Vientiane from the C-46.

In August 1960, Aviation Laotienne officially became the Royal Lao Air Force.

=== Soviet air bridge ===
Although the Soviet Union did not contribute directly to the development of the RLAF, its actions in 1960–1961 had a great influence on RLAF development. In response to an appeal for help from Kong Le, the Soviet Union dedicated 44 transport aircraft to support of the Neutralist forces. Beginning in December 1960, the Soviets flew in military supplies, beginning with a battery of 105 mm howitzers. Soviet pilots flew about 1,000 sorties by March 1961 in support of the Neutralists even as they withdrew northward onto the Plain of Jars. The Soviet effort included some drops of Kong Le's paratroopers, as well as the provision of three Lisunov Li-2s to his air force. During the same time frame, the Vietnam People's Air Force's 919th Transport Regiment flew 184 resupply sorties from northern Vietnam into Sam Neua. The communist efforts sparked American efforts to beef up the RLAF.

When Kong Le retreated from Vientiane, he took with him two usable C-47s and two L-20 Beavers from Aviation Laotienne and formed the Neutralist Laotian Air Force. Nosavan's offensive followed Kong Le's forces to the Plain of Jars.

The Soviet air bridge terminated in May 1962, following the armistice of the 10th. In late 1962, a contingent of Neutralist cadets went to the Soviet Union for over a year's aviation training. Before the Soviets departed Laos, in November and December 1962, the Soviets bequeathed three Li-2s to the Neutralists, and three Li-2s and three Antonov An-2 biplanes to the Pathet Lao air arm. It also gave three Li-2s and a Mil Mi-4 helicopter to the RLAF. However, a lack of spare parts soon began to ground these aircraft.

=== American response to Soviets ===
In response to the Soviet air bridge, U. S. President Dwight D. Eisenhower had his officials prompt Thailand to supply six AT-6 Texans to the RLAF as a light strike capability on 9 January 1961. In return, the Thais were compensated by the Americans with five jet Cessna T-37 Tweets. Three Lao pilots for the AT-6s were already available, including Thao Ma. The new light strike craft flew their first successful sorties on 15 January. One of the T-6s was shot down on 17 January 1961. The RLAF augmented its pilots' ranks with four volunteer Thai pilots from the Royal Thai Air Force's 63rd Squadron, who began flying missions by mid February. Most of the remaining T-6s became casualties in March, with two colliding in midair, one falling to ground fire, and another lost on a training flight. The RLAF was temporarily nearly wiped out.

During March and April 1961, in an abortive attempt to beef up RLAF firepower, 18 U. S. Air Force officers volunteered for discharge and entry into Operation Millpond. These pilots were commissioned into the RLAF so they could fly Douglas A-26 Invader bombers in Laos. They were augmented by four Air America pilots. However, political considerations in the wake of the Bay of Pigs Invasion precluded use of the Invaders.

The United States began its own air bridge in April 1961, as well as photographic reconnaissance efforts. RLAF transport capacity was augmented to 13 C-47s, and were used for the RLAF's first significant airlift when they carried three battalions of Royal Lao troops to Sam Neua. The U. S. also supplied ten more AT-6s for ground attack missions to the RLAF via the medium of the Thai air force. During a four plane sortie by AT-6s flown from Luang Prabang's airfield during April 1961, Lieutenant Khampanh of the RLAF downed a Soviet Ilyushin Il-4 of its air bridge fleet, using unguided missiles to do so. This was the RLAF's sole air-to-air victory. However, shortcomings of the aging AT-6s were becoming apparent to the U. S. and T-28s being retired by the Republic of Vietnam Air Force were earmarked for the RLAF, but not delivered because of the truce.

On 2 May 1961, the communists overran the airfield at Moung Sing; the following day, they captured an RLAF C-47 that landed because its crew was unaware of the communist takeover.

The upshot of infantry clashes on the Plain of Jars was a directive from U.S. President John F. Kennedy in May 1961 that the U.S. Ambassador to Laos would serve as the de facto military commander in Laos. His approval was needed for all air strikes in country. The Air Attaché's office served as his staff for employment of air power in Laos.

10 May 1962 armistice limited RLAF operations, with the T-6s becoming non-operational, although Lao aviation cadets were forwarded to Lopburi, Thailand for T-28 training in June 1962. However, during the truce, Vang Pao used his CIA supported Hmong army of hilltribesmen to begin grubbing out short landing strips to be used for logistical support of his troops by helicopters and STOL aircraft. These tiny primitive air strips would proliferate throughout Laos and became a major component of the Royalist war effort; they would eventually be approximately 200 of these so-called Lima Sites. They would be essential for resupply, quick aerial movement of troops, and refugee relief operations.

The International Agreement on the Neutrality of Laos was signed on 23 July 1962, and went into effect in October. On 6 October 1962, the last of the American Military Advisory Group departed Laos in conformance with the Agreement. The following day, 40 Vietnamese communists having been repatriated out of the 7,000 known to have been in Laos, the North Vietnamese proclaimed they had honored the Agreement. Lip service to observing the Agreement would shape the entire American effort to organize and operate the RLAF, with all the American technicians and advisors accredited under diplomatic cover as military attachés. Although America would continue to support its Lao clients, it would also maintain the facade of observing the 1962 agreement.

=== Expansion ===
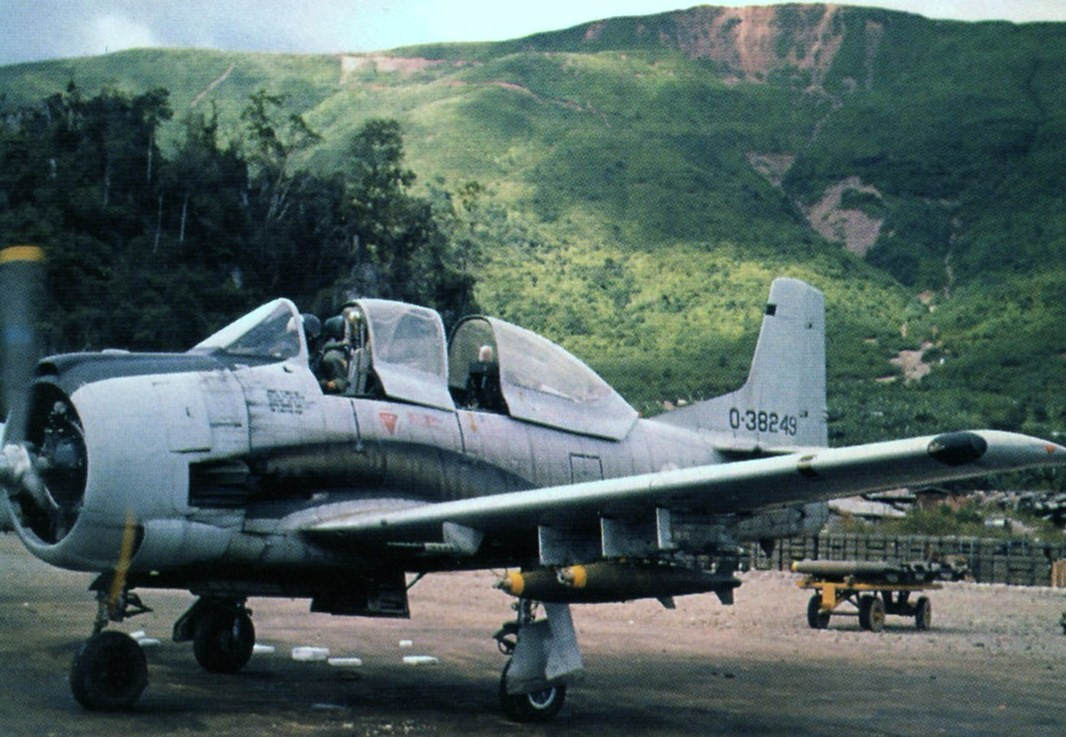
A RLAF T-28D Nomad armed trainer taxies at Long Tieng airfield, September 1972

By the time fighting broke out again in Laos, the RLAF had five T-28 pilots trained at Moody Air Force Base, Georgia to fly the T-28s that were supplied in July and August 1963 to Wattay Airfield outside Vientiane. The United States also supplied the RLAF with bombs and rockets, although temporarily withholding fuses as a means of control.

One of the "new" T-28s soon crashed in Vientiane due to a failed coup. Another T-28 disappeared from inventory when Lieutenant Chert Saibory, who had defected from the RTAF to the RLAF, defected once more in September 1963. He flew his T-28 into North Vietnam, where he was imprisoned. Despite this, on 26 October 1963 the U. S. State Department cabled Ambassador Unger with clearance to use the T-28s to intercept North Vietnamese supply flights to the Pathet Lao. Unger was the first of three ambassadors to control the American air assets supplied to the RLAF; the others were his successors, William H. Sullivan and G. McMurtrie Godley.

Operation Waterpump was set up in Thailand to train more Lao pilots in March 1964. It consisted of 38 Air Commandos and four T-28D trainers stationed at Udorn Royal Thai Air Force Base. Also in March 1964, Ambassador Unger lobbied his State Department for an expanded role for the RLAF. The RLAF flew its first T-28 strike missions directed at communists on the Plain of Jars on 17 May 1964. Unger released the embassy's ordnance inventory to the RLAF that same day. Operation Waterpump also forwarded its four T-28s to the RLAF. Two days later, ten surplus T-28s arrived from South Vietnam; four were retained by Waterpump so it could resume training operations while the other six were passed on to the RLAF. To bridge the pilot shortage until Waterpump graduated Lao pilots, the American Programs Evaluation Office covertly recruited five volunteer pilots from Air America, dubbing them the "A Team". They flew their first strike on 25 May 1964; two of the T-28s were damaged by antiaircraft fire while missing their target. Because of the possibility of political fallout if an American pilot should fall into enemy hands, PEO brought in Thai pilots from the RTAF's 223rd Squadron on six-month tours of duty, in a classified operation known as Project Firefly. These recruited mercenaries were known as the "B Team", and began flying strike missions on 1 June 1964. To complete the team designations, Lao pilots were designated as the "C Team". The A and B Teams were under control of Ambassador Unger.

By June 1964, when the strategic road junction of Highways 7 and 13 was threatened by communist forces, the RLAF had 20 T-28s and 13 Lao pilots ready for action. Ten more Lao pilot cadets were nearing the end of their training, and were to be available on 9 August 1964. Ten Thai and six American pilots were also available for immediate duty with the RLAF. Four additional T-28s were available at Udorn. Fifteen additional T-28s were becoming available from the Republic of Vietnam Air Force, which was re-equipping with A-1 Skyraiders.

Also during June 1964, a flight of A Team T-28s bombed Kong Le's Neutralist headquarters at Khang Khay in a successful attempt to make him switch his alliance from the Pathet Lao to side with the Royalists. As a followup, the A Team also attacked the Chinese Cultural Center on the Plain of Jars; the Center was reputedly a Chinese-staffed training camp for Lao communist troops.

During July 1964, American forward air control efforts to guide both RLAF and USAF air strikes began with a detachment of combat controllers mounted in Air America aircraft temporarily covertly imported for the operation.

The threat posed by North Vietnamese antiaircraft fire escalated steadily in northern Laos. This led to the assignment of the more experienced B Team Thai pilots to missions in northern Laos, with the less experienced Lao pilots flying their strike missions into southern Laos. The RLAF was now operating from Pakse and Savannakhet, as well as Luang Prabang and Vientiane.

=== American/Vietnam War ===
America officially entered the Vietnam War as a result of the Gulf of Tonkin incident on 4 August 1964. There was a prompt escalation of RLAF activities and losses as a result. Ambassador Unger pressured the RLAF to strike communist forces on the Plain of Jars and the Ho Chi Minh trail by presenting the Royalist government with a list of targets that he wanted the RLAF to hit. Losses escalated. A T-28 was shot down by Vietnamese 37 mm anti-aircraft guns on 14 August. On 18 August 1964, Lieutenant Colonel Viripong, commander of the RTAF's 223rd Squadron, went down in an RLAF T-28 on the Plain of Jars while on an unauthorized mission, while another T-28 was lost in North Vietnam.

Covert American air activities during this time span expanded to include U. S. forward air control pilots in the Steve Canyon Program, who directed the air strikes. On 30 September, the American Joint Chiefs of Staff approved a list of targets in eastern Laos suggested by the U. S. Air Force. Lao Prime Minister Souvanna Phouma concurred. On 14 October 1964, Thao Ma led three flights of RLAF T-28s from Savannakhet in the initial air raid against the Mụ Giạ Pass, the northern terminus of the Ho Chi Minh trail.

In January 1965, an ordnance accident at Wattay Airbase caused the loss of eight RLAF T-28s and a C-47. The losses greatly reduced the operations of the Thai B Team pilots until May. In that month, the RLAF scored its first victories over tanks, destroying two, along with five trucks. It was during this time period that Ambassador Sullivan saw that the burgeoning bombing effort needed to be regulated. Superseding prior policy, he established a forward air control system of airborne American forward air controllers, Thai forward air guides, and Lao observers to approve air strikes. The increased control made close air support of ground troops by the RLAF B Team possible; American fighter bombers had to be guided by a T-28 strike. However, for interdiction sorties, Sullivan was the final authority except for road reconnaissance missions hitting fleeting targets of opportunity.

Summer 1965 marked the beginning of internal dissension within RLAF ranks. The charismatic aggressive commander of the RLAF, General Thao Ma, evoked jealousy from other Royalist generals. There was a purported assassination attempt against Thao Ma on 3 July 1965.

In mid-1965, the American "civilian" aviation specialists secretly supplied to the Royalist government were organized into Air Operation Centers. An Air Operation Center was established in each of Laos' five military regions, with the personnel being recruited via the U. S. Air Force's Palace Dog program. On both 1 and 2 August 1965, RLAF B Team T-28s struck North Vietnam; on the 18th, a T-28 on a similar raid was shot down, and cross border attacks by the RLAF were suspended.

By August 1965, RLAF sortie rate had drastically increased as attack aircraft inventory had built up to 24 T-28s, augmented by 3 RT-28s and several C-47s. The latter were used as improvised gunships/bombers, being armed with 0.50 caliber machine guns and equipped with a roller system to trundle 250 pound bombs out the cargo door during flight. This successful field expedient was eventually cancelled however, as it interfered with opium smuggling activities by some of the Royal Lao high command.

In October 1965, cross border raids against communist munition depots in North Vietnam resumed for a short time before being permanently terminated. November 1965 saw the arrival of five U. S. Army O-1E Bird Dogs for use by the Raven Forward Air Controllers directing the RLAF. Late 1965 also saw the acquisition of three more C-47s by the RLAF. Two Lao army generals tried to lay claim to them, but were fended off by Thao Ma; he believed the planes would be used for smuggling instead of military transport. The generals retaliated by limiting promotions within the RLAF, and thus undermining Thao Ma.

By Spring 1966, the RLAF had grown to 40 T-28s. Thai B Team pilots continued to be crucial to RLAF operation, with 23 arriving in Laos in early 1966. Also, in an effort to increase the pool of T-28 pilots, the CIA began training several dozen Hmong pilot candidates in Thailand. Seven of them would graduate as T-28 pilots; others would become transport or liaison pilots; a few would become helicopter pilots. Washouts from the program were repurposed as aerial observers, often flying with the Raven FACs.

The chief of staff of the RLAF was bribed to lead a mutiny against Thao Ma. In retaliation, on 4 June 1966, Thao Ma launched an unsuccessful insurrection. In the wake of this failed revolt, a Military Transport Command was founded and placed under Brigadier-General Sourith Don Sasorith, although Thao Ma continued to command the T-28s. After this unsuccessful coup, General Thao Ma transferred his headquarters from Savannakhet to Luang Prabang. He was slated to be demoted into a newly created desk job in Vientiane. He flew combat missions from Luang Prabang until 22 October 1966, when he once again attempted a coup. He launched a flight of eight T-28s on a raid against the home of several opposing Royalist generals in Vientiane, as well as the General Staff headquarters and two munitions depots. Although 36 people were killed by the air strikes, the coup was unsuccessful. The American ambassador intervened to halt the coup. Thao Ma and ten of his pilots flew their T-28s into exile in Thailand. Several dozen RLAF technicians also absconded on a C-47. With Thao Ma's departure, General Sourith ascended to command of the entire RLAF.

By 9 November 1966, Operation Waterpump had graduated 42 new Lao T-28 pilots. However, because of defections and casualties, only 24 still remained on the RLAF rolls. In an attempt to project RLAF needs into the future, Ambassador William H. Sullivan predicted that perhaps seven defecting Lao pilots could be recovered from Thailand, and that six more Lao pilot cadets were about to graduate from training. Sullivan foresaw a need for 55 to 60 Lao pilots to man 44 to 48 T-28s. He noted the importance of having T-28 pilots with a common language with Lao ground troops, for whom the RLAF flew close air support. Until a sufficient number of Lao pilots had been trained, Thai pilots, whose language was akin to Lao, would fill the close air support role, leaving U. S. Air Force planes free to strike interdiction targets. By the end of 1966, over half of the year's combat sorties had been flown by B Team pilots. The B Team pilots had begun using Muang Soui as an advanced base near the Plain of Jars, cutting their sortie time and raising their sortie rate.

=== Under General Sourith ===
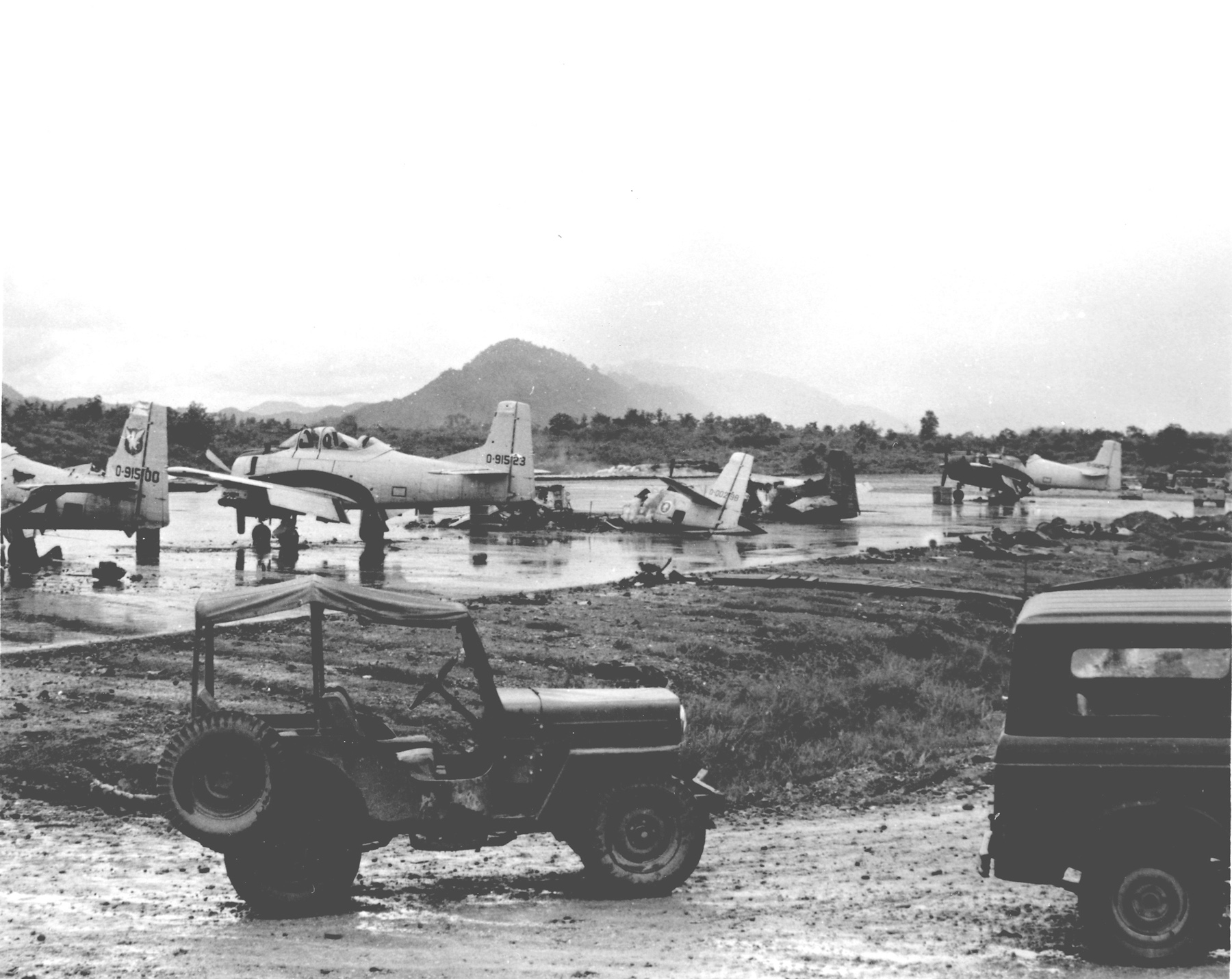
RLAF T-28s lay destroyed after a North Vietnamese sapper attack at Luang Prabang airfield, 1967.

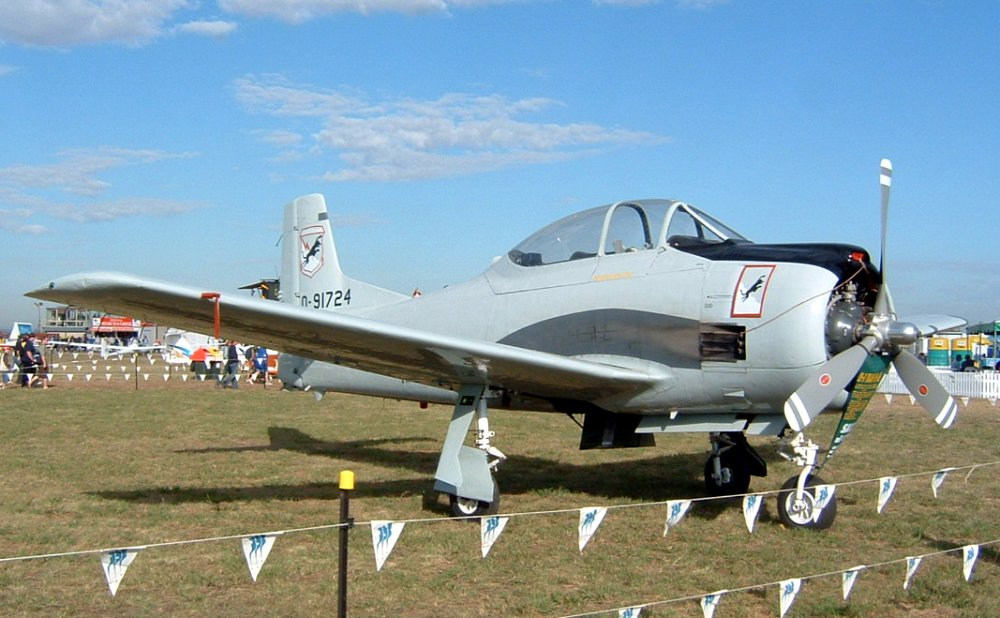
North American T-28 Trojan trainer aircraft, ex-Royal Laotian Air Force.

In early 1967, North Vietnamese sappers struck the Luang Prabang airfield on two occasions, destroying 17 RLAF T-28s.

From 20 to 27 May 1967, the RLAF joined the U. S. Air Force in the second series of air strikes directed against Route 110 of the Sihanouk Trail in southern Laos. The RLAF contributed 41 sorties to the effort.

Unlike Ma, General Sourith countenanced gold and opium smuggling using RLAF transports. However, beginning at noon on 30 July 1967, Sourith directed two days of RLAF T-28 air strikes on a smuggler's caravan of 300 mules carrying 16 tons of opium that entered western Laos from Burma at Ban Khwan.

During the end of 1967, seven RLAF T-28s flew support for Royalist troops engaged in the Battle of Nam Bac; unfortunately, a lack of air-ground coordination rendered the air strikes ineffective. RLAF logistical support of ground troops via helicopter also proved inadequate. In the wake of the disastrous defeat at Nam Bac in early 1968, the Royal Lao Army became ineffective, increasing the combat burden on the RLAF. The air arm was augmented to 45 to 50 T-28s, with 25 to 30 additional ones held in reserve in Thailand. The RLAF also had on strength nine UH-34s helicopters and 16 C-47s.

In February 1968, the RLAF suffered a serious loss, when a flight of three T-28s on a close air support mission in poor weather flew headlong into a ridge in Military Region 2. There were no survivors. In another demoralizing incident, on 21 March 1968, a RLAF C-47 crew was arrested at Tan Son Nhut Air Base, Vietnam for smuggling gold and opium. Subsequently, Ambassador Sullivan declined to supply five more C-47s to the RLAF, on the grounds they would be used for smuggling.

By June 1968, because of T-28 losses, pilot losses, and resultant low morale, RLAF tactical air was diminished to flying its lowest sortie rate in four years. The "civilian" aviation specialists supplied from the USAF were increased to ten per Air Operations Center, taking charge of all T-28 support functions for a gain in short term efficiency. As a result, RLAF strike sorties for December tripled over January's score, totaling 1,522 missions. By year's end, the RLAF T-28s had flown approximately 10,000 combat sorties. By contrast, the RLAF's transport C-47s were still brazenly misused for opium and gold smuggling, and chartered out as civilian airliners.

In 1969, the RLAF's advisors started a couple of programs aimed at raising the T-28 pilots' morale. Most immediate was a combat pay bonus paid for every strike sortie flown. Escape and evasion training was also offered in Hua Hin, Thailand; it also doubled as seaside R&R. However, with no stand-down, operations continued. On 27 June 1969, the advanced RLAF base at Muang Soui was overrun by North Vietnamese sappers and infantry. On 11 July 1969, the most famous of the RLAF's Hmong pilots, Captain Lee Lue, was shot down and killed after flying over 1,000 combat sorties in less than 18 months. Between April and September 1969, the first two Lao forward air controllers were trained. In late 1969, the Hmong mercenaries on the ground, supported by RLAF and U. S. air strikes, recaptured most of the Plain of Jars. The first three AC-47 Spooky gunships were received from the U. S. and Vietnamese Air Forces, and the first missions flown on 5 September. There were teething problems–air crews were expected to fly C-47s by day as well as AC-47s at night; gunners burned out guns; munitions were fired just for resale value of the brass; Vang Pao was initially reluctant to employ them for fear of friendly casualties. The experience of the pilots helped though; for instance, Captain Khamphanh (of the air-to-air victory) had logged over 7,000 flying hours. Nevertheless, the three Spookies soon proved their worth and began averaging about 50 nocturnal combat sorties per month.

By January 1970, the People's Republic of China had taken advantage of a pre-existing treaty to build a highway south from Yunnan Province through western Laos toward the Thai/Lao border. The Chinese dispatched a truck convoy southwards on that road. As it was approaching Pak Beng, it came under air attack by two B Team T-28s of the RLAF, with 15 trucks destroyed. Further air assaults on that road were deterred, however, by the stationing of 400 antiaircraft guns of various calibers along its length.

In March 1970, the North Vietnamese again attacked on the Plain of Jars. A few days later, on 18 March, an advanced RLAF air base at Sam Thong was overrun. In the fighting on the Plain des Jarres, the RLAF lost three T-28Ds, plus two O-1 and one U-17 light aircraft. The need for air power became so desperate that Air America C-7 Caribous were used as makeshift bombers, dropping barrels of napalm on the invading Vietnamese. Communist forces pushed close enough to the RLAF bases at Muang Soui and Long Tieng that combat sortie time dwindled enough that one Hmong T-28 pilot flew 31 missions in a single day.

The effects of the Vietnamization effort of 1970 carried over into Laos. An expanded training program for Lao T-28 pilots was begun. The B Team program was ended on 4 September 1970 as the supply of Lao pilots finally caught up to demand, the Thais having supplied ten drafts of pilots to the RLAF. A Combined Operations Center under Colonel Bouathong Phontivongsa coordinated air activities with the Army General Staff. The RLAF T-28s flew a greater proportion of their missions under Forward Air Control. However, the RLAF faced some major problems. Pilot mortality was one, with T-28 pilots surviving only an average of 20 months in combat. Also, by August 1970, smuggling had evolved to the point where 70 tons of M16 rifles and other ordnance were exchanged with the Nationalist Chinese for opium at Ban Houayxay. Another weak point, never really solved, was the dearth of qualified Lao maintenance and logistics personnel. An attempt to solve the shortage was made when all the RLAF T-28s were released from U. S. control to the RLAF, with an expanded training program being run, however middle management plus command and control skills were weak in the RLAF. Nevertheless, T-28 combat missions had reached the 30,000 sortie level by year's end. A Rand Corporation study characterized RLAF performance as outstanding, noting that some RLAF pilots had flown over 1,000 combat sorties to date.

In May 1971, the RLAF base at Pakse was threatened by communist troops, so its T-28s were moved back into Thailand to Ubon Royal Thai Air Force Base. However, on 11 June, the eight available T-28s flew 88 destructive sorties against attacking Vietnamese communists, with one pilot notching up 14 missions.

In July 1971, the RLAF AC-47 squadron had been brought up to its authorized strength of 10 planes. However, the squadron soon suffered a serious loss when its commanding officer, Colonel Thao Ly, was shot down in flames.

By December 1971, the RLAF faced a fresh threat. North Vietnamese attacks into the Plain of Jars were supported by an air cover of Mikoyan-Gurevich MiG-21 fighters, forcing a temporary withdrawal of the RLAF. However, RLAF T-28s and AC-47s soon returned to action, flying from Long Tieng. Although operating off an airstrip menaced by intruding tanks and under occasional 130mm shell fire, the RLAF continued to strike the enemy. Many of the T-28 bombing sorties flown were only minutes in duration, because the enemy was so close. Combat sorties for the year amounted to about 30,000.

In late 1972, General Vang Pao launched his final offensive, trying once again to retake the Plain of Jars. RLAF tactical air had by now gone beyond the close air support mission to serve as flying artillery; for example, it was tasked with flying up to 80 daily sorties in advance of Vang Pao's Task Force Delta advance, beginning 24 August. The shortcomings of this approach became apparent on 9 September, when a bad drop by a T-28 inflicted 80 casualties on friendly ground troops and smashed their advance on the enemy. RLAF and Air America UH-34 copters joined USAF CH-53s and eight Air America C-47s in a huge offensive airlift of Vang Pao's troops. After a month, the offensive stalled in a welter of miscoordination among the three air fleets. Also, by the end of 1972, the American drawdown of the Vietnam War effort began to affect the RLAF. However, the yearly combat sortie total remained at about 30,000.

=== Under General Bouathong ===
General Bouathong moved from command of the Combined Operations Center to overall command of the RLAF in 1973. By early 1973, the RLAF's strength reached its zenith, with 2,150 personnel and 180 aircraft. The aircraft inventory included 75 AT-28s and eight AC-47s for combat use. Transport and light aircraft encompassed 15 O-1 Birddogs and 18 C-47s. The Americans decided to hand over some excess aircraft at the last moment, to augment the RLAF. The RLAF helicopter inventory was augmented by 24 UH-34s from the Vietnamese Air Force, bringing the total to 43, in an attempt to replace Air America's lift capacity as it departed Laos. Air America gave the RLAF ten Cessna T-41 Mescalero trainers and ten C-123K transports. General Bouathong plead in vain for newer and more sufficient aircraft, but was refused by the Americans. In that same month, January 1973, the RLAF flew 4,482 sorties before an armistice was signed on the 22nd.

In April 1973, the armistice was breached, and the RLAF resumed combat operations. However, it was a force in decline, as its available T-28s dwindled to 40 and its monthly sortie rate declined to about 2,000. Two of the eight Spooky gunships were removed from action; the remainder were then disarmed and reverted to transports.

On 20 August 1973, General Thao Ma led a convoy of 60 truckloads of troops back into Laos and conquered Wattay Air Base. He and six other Lao pilots launched in T-28s and reprised an attempt at an aerial coup by bombing the government headquarters. However, a Royal Lao Army counter-attack recaptured Wattay, and Ma was shot down while landing. Although he survived the crashlanding, he was promptly executed.

By mid-1974, Air America wrapped up its operations in Laos. The American supply line was nearly closed. Starved of fuel, spares, and munitions, the RLAF rapidly wasted away. The Combined Operations Center was closed. Out country training of personnel ceased. Soon, the RLAF pilots were flying a mere two hours per month.

On 14 April 1975, the RLAF flew its final combat sortie. At Vang Pao's command, nine T-28s struck a column of Pathet Lao trucks moving south into Vientiane, causing heavy casualties. The following month, as Communist agitators fomented mass demonstrations against the Royal Lao Government, many RLAF pilots defected to Thailand. Sixteen T-28s that they took were later handed on to the Philippine Air Force.

=== Aftermath ===
The Lao People's Liberation Army Air Force found itself short of trained personnel to operate its expanded inventory of aircraft against the continuing Hmong insurgency. Ex-RLAF T-28s were used to bomb Hmong villages. Imprisoned RLAF pilots were released to fly for the new government. Between 1975 and 1977, there were nine defections by them into Thailand. The LPLAAF thus lost two of its 29 T-28s; four UH-34 helicopters, a C-47, a T-41, and an Antonov AN-2 also made the trip south, with the latter being returned.

=== Major timeline ===
- 28 January 1955: the Aviation Laotiènne is established
- 1960: the Pathet Lao begins to operate aircraft
- August 1960: the Aviation Laotiènne is renamed the Royal Lao Air Force (RLAF)
- Spring 1963: dissident Kong Le's Neutralist air arm is re-integrated into the RLAF
- Early 1976: the Royal Lao Air Force is renamed the Lao People's Liberation Army Air Force (LPLAAF)

== Aviation school ==
A flying school was first established by the French at Wattay Air Base in January 1955 to train Laotian pilot cadets, later transferred to Seno Air Base and placed under the control of the RLAF's Air Training Command – ATC (Commandement de l'Entraînement Aérienne – CEA), being re-designated the RLAF Pilot Training School (École d'Entraînement de Pilotes – EEP). The school's own curriculum included flight instruction, navigation training, combat tactics, aircraft systems training and other technical instruction to Laotian pilots for various aircraft types used by the RLAF, including helicopters and fixed-wing aircraft. The training programs aimed to develop the skills and proficiency of Laotian pilots in operating and flying their assigned aircraft effectively and were often assisted by U.S. military advisors and instructors, who provided expertise in flight operations, maintenance, and other areas.

== Uniforms and insignia ==
The Royal Laotian Air Force owed its origin and traditions to the French Far East Airforces (Forces Aériennes en Extrême-Orient – FAEO) of the First Indochina War, and even after the United States took the role as the main foreign sponsor for the Royal Laotian Armed Forces at the beginning of the 1960s, French military influence was still perceptible in their uniforms and insignia.

=== Service dress ===
Upon its formation at the mid-1950s, Laotian Aviation personnel received the French Army's M1945 tropical working and service dress (Tenue de toile kaki clair Mle 1945), standard issue in the ANL, consisting of a light khaki cotton shirt and pants. Modelled after the WWII U.S. Army tropical "Chino" working dress, the shirt had two patch breast pockets closed by clip-cornered straight flaps and shoulder straps whilst the trousers featured two pleats at the front hips, side slashed pockets and an internal pocket at the back, on the right side. In alternative, the short-sleeved M1946 (Chemisette kaki clair Mle 1946) – which had two pleated patch breast pockets closed by pointed flaps – and the "Chino"-style M1949 (Chemisette kaki clair Mle 1949) khaki shirts could be worn with the matching M1946 khaki shorts (Culotte courte kaki clair Mle 1946) in hot weather. Laotian Aviation ground personnel in the field often wore the standard ANL French all-arms M1947 drab green fatigues (Treillis de combat Mle 1947).

Laotian Aviation officers wore the standard ANL summer service dress uniform in light khaki cotton, which was patterned after the French Army M1946/56 khaki dress uniform (French: Vareuse d'officier Mle 1946/56 et Pantalon droit Mle 1946/56); for formal occasions, a light summer version in white cotton was also issued. The open-collar jacket had two pleated breast pockets closed by pointed flaps and two unpleated at the side closed by straight ones whilst the sleeves had false turnbacks; the front fly and pocket flaps were secured by gilt buttons. The uniform was worn with a matching Khaki shirt and black tie on service dress whereas the white version was worn with a white shirt and a black tie instead.

Reflecting the increasing American influence, a new set of distinctive uniforms was introduced for the RLAF in 1964. Officers received a Air Force Blue overseas dress uniform, consisting of a tunic and slacks whose cut was modelled after the U.S. Air Force M1947 service dress. The American-style open-collar, four-buttoned tunic had two pleated breast pockets closed by scalloped flaps and two built-in pockets at the side closed by straight flaps. The front fly and pocket flaps were secured by silver buttons bearing the standard FAR wreathed trident emblem. On active service, the Air Force Blue dress uniform was worn with a light blue shirt and Air Force Blue tie, replaced on formal occasions by a white shirt and black tie; a short-sleeved light blue shirt was worn on hot weather. Light blue and Air Force Blue work uniforms were also issued to RLAF ground and flight personnel, which consisted of a light cotton shirt and pants. The former was based on the French Army's M1948 shirt (Chemise de toile Mle 1948) which featured a six-buttoned front and two pleated breast pockets closed by pointed flaps, was provided with shoulder straps (Epaulettes) and had long sleeves with buttoned cuffs. It was worn with matching trousers similar to the French M1945/52 pattern (Pantalon de toile Mle 1945/52), which had two pleats at the front hips, side slashed pockets and an internal pocket at the back, on the right side.

Despite occasional attempts at standardization, a great deal of latitude was noted in flight clothing; on combat missions RLAF aircrews relied on an inconsistent American-run supply system supplemented by items purchased during training in Thailand. Although U.S. K-2B Olive Green (OG) flight suits were provided, Laotian pilots often wore commercial black and camouflage flight suits or standard issue Royal Lao Army (RLA) OG and camouflage combat jungle fatigues in lieu, usually with a US Air Force survival mesh vest. RLAF ground personnel adopted in the 1960s U.S. Army OG-107 utilities, followed in 1971 by the M1967 Jungle Utility Uniform. Olive green U.S. M-1951 field jackets were also issued to all-ranks.

=== Headgear ===
Laotian Aviation officers received the ANL service peaked cap in both light khaki and white-topped versions, which was copied after the French M1927 pattern (Casquette d'officier Mle 1927) to wear with either the light khaki or white service dress uniforms. The peaked caps were worn with the standard gilt metal ANL cap device, a wreathed Airavata crest bearing the Laotian Royal Arms (Erawan) – a three-headed white elephant standing on a pedestal and surmounted by a pointed parasol – set on a black teardrop-shaped background patch. Ground and flight personnel generally wore the standard ANL and CEFEO headgear of the period, which consisted of French M1946 and M1957 light khaki sidecaps (Bonnet de police de toile kaki clair Mle 1946 and Bonnet de police de toile kaki clair Mle 1957), M1946 "Gourka" tropical berets (Bérét de toile kaki clair Mle 1946), M1949 bush hats (Chapeau de brousse Mle 1949) and light khaki cotton baseball cap-style field caps.

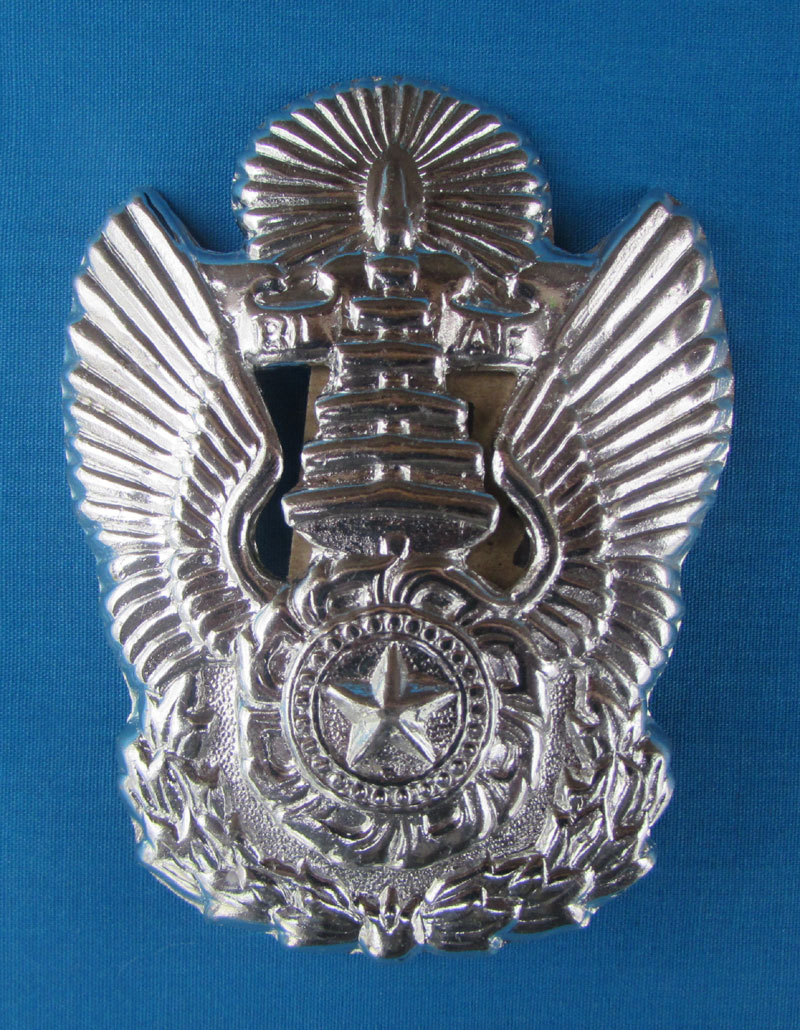
Royal Lao Air Force officer's cap badge, used between 1967 and 1974.

In 1964, the RLAF adopted a new Air Force Blue service peaked cap with crown of "Germanic" shape – very similar to that worn by the Royal Lao Army (RLA) or Republic of Vietnam Air Force (VNAF) officers –, with a gold cord chinstrap and plain black leather peak for flag officers whereas the general officers' version had gold embroidered flame decoration on both the black cap band and peak and a gold braid chinstrap. It was initially worn with the standard gilt metal FAR combined "Shiva" trident and "Chakra" cap device, replaced after 1967 by a distinctive RLAF silver cap badge, which was used until 1974, when the RLAF reverted back to using the FAR badge. A Air Force Blue overseas flight cap (with silver cord piping in the flap for officers), styled after the French M1957 sidecap, was also adopted. Besides regulation headgear, unofficial Olive Green and camouflage cloth berets, baseball caps and U.S. Boonie hats found their way into the RLAF from the United States, Thailand and South Vietnam, to which were soon added Laotian-made copies; a red embroidered baseball cap was given to graduate pilots of the T-28 fighter-bomber course held at the RLAF Flying School in Seno Airbase, near Savannakhet. A miniature pin-on silver metal version of the FAR cap badge edged scarlet red was sometimes worn placed on the front panel of OG baseball caps by both officers and enlisted men.

=== Footwear ===
White and brown low laced leather shoes were prescribed to wear with either the earlier ANL khaki service/work uniform or the white summer dress for all-ranks; after 1964 black shoes were required for RLAF officers wearing the new Air Force Blue officers' dress uniform on formal occasions. Laotian Aviation personnel in the field initially wore a mixture of American and French regulation footwear, including brown leather U.S. Army Service Shoes, brown leather U.S. M-1943 Combat Service Boots, French M1917 brown leather hobnailed ankle boots (Brodequins modéle 1917), French M1953 brown leather "Rangers" (Rangers modéle 1953) and French Pataugas olive canvas-and-rubber jungle boots, replaced by flip-flops and leather peasant sandals while in garrison. Black leather combat boots began to be provided to the RLAF in the 1960s by the Americans, who issued both the early U.S. Army M-1962 "McNamara" model and the M-1967 model with DMS "ripple" pattern rubbler sole. A few Laotian pilots and senior officers managed to acquire the U.S. Army Jungle boot, a highly prized item not issued to the RLAF whilst local copies of the Canadian Bata tropical boots and South Vietnamese black canvas-and-rubber Indigenous Combat Boots were worn by ground personnel.

=== Air Force ranks ===
Initially, the Laotian Aviation wore the same rank insignia as their French and ANL counterparts, whose sequence followed closely the French Air Force pattern defined by the 1956 regulations. Junior officers (Officiers supérieurs et officiers subalternes) ranks were worn on black removable shoulder boards (pattes d'épaule) or shoulder strap slides (passants d'épaule) similar to the Army pattern, with the addition of a pair of stylized wings on the inner end. NCOs (Sous-officiers et aviateurs) and airmen (Hommes de troupe) wore metal or cloth chevrons on both upper sleeves or pinned to the chest.

In 1959, the Royal Lao Army adopted a new distinctively Laotian-designed system of military ranks, which became in September 1961 the standard rank chart for all branches of service of the newly created Royal Lao Armed Forces. Under the new regulations, RLAF officers were now entitled to wear on their service or dress uniforms stiffened shoulder boards edged with gold braid identical to the standard RLA pattern, except that the background colour was Air Force Blue instead of red. Junior officers added an appropriate number of five-pointed gold stars to their boards whilst NCOs wore chevrons on the upper sleeve. Airmen wore no insignia. However, these regulations were slowly implemented, and for a time U.S. Air Force rank insignia were worn by RLAF personnel as an interim measure.

On active service, Laotian Aviation officers had their shoulder boards initially replaced by either shoulder strap slides or a single chest tab (patte de poitrine) pinned to the shirt's front fly following French Army practice. By the late 1960s the RLAF adopted the same American-style system as their RLA counterparts, in which metal pin-on or embroidered cloth rank insignia – either in yellow-on-green full-colour or black-on-green subdued form – were worn on the right collar of flight suits and jungle fatigues, although metal rank insignia could also be worn pinned directly to the shoulder straps as per in the Army and the MRL.

=== Rank insignia ===
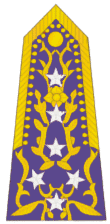
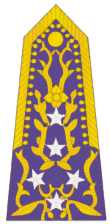
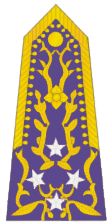
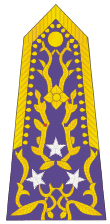
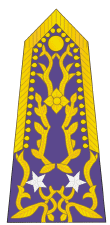
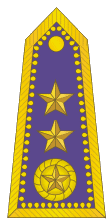
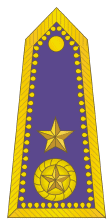
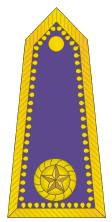
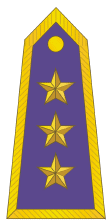
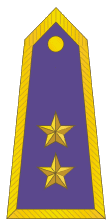
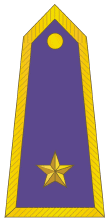
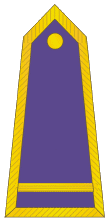
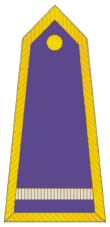
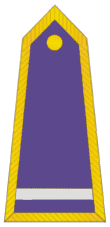
Royal Lao Air Force
Royal Lao Air Force	Marshal of the air force Chom Phonäkäd	General / Colonel general / Air Chief Marshal; Phoun Êekäkäd	Lieutenant general / Air Marshal; Phonthöäkäd	Major general / Air Vice-Marshal; Phontrïäkäd	Brigadier general Phoun Chatäävä	Colonel; Phan Êek	Lieutenant Colonel; Phan Thö	Major; Phan Trïï	Captain; Loei Êek	1st lieutenant Loei Thö	2nd lieutenant Loei Trïï	Officer designate (Warrant officer); Wáa Trii Haui Trii	Cadet 2nd year Nakhian naihony äkäd	Cadet 1st year Nakhian naihony äkäd

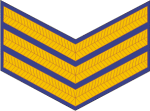
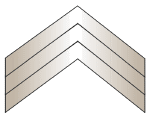
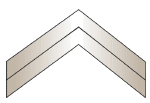
Royal Lao Air Force							No insignia	No insignia
Royal Lao Air Force	Warrant officer Wáa Trii Hua Trii	Sergeant major Cãã Êek	Master sergeant Cãã Thó	Sergeant 1st class Cãã Trii	Staff sergeant Sip Êek	Sergeant; Sip Thó	Corporal; Sip Trii	Airman basic Phonthahan

=== Insignia ===
A metal pilot's qualification badge was created in the mid-1960s, in two classes. It was identical to the U.S. Air Force wings, except for the letters "RLAF" stamped across the top of the central crest. The badge was worn over the left breast pocket on service dress and working uniforms, whilst an embroidered white version on a blue cloth background was worn on flight suits. Cloth blue and subdued nametapes were occasionally worn above the right shirt or jacket pocket on field dress and flight suits; blue plastic nameplates with white lettering were worn with the working and dress uniforms. Full-colour embroidered, woven or printed squadron insignia went over the right breast; RLAF service insignia – a winged lotus leaf rosette – went on the right collar. RLAF pilots sent for training in Thailand wore on the right shoulder a Laotian national emblem with "Laos" tab.

== See also ==
- Air America
- Khmer Air Force (KAF)
- Laotian Civil War
- List of weapons of the Laotian Civil War
- Palace Dog
- Project 404
- Raven Forward Air Controllers
- Republic of Vietnam Air Force (VNAF)
- Royal Thai Air Force (RTAF)
- 1967 Opium War
