= Operation Millpond =

American covert operation in 1961

- Part of Laotian Civil War
- Type: Covert operation
- Location: Laos; Okinawa, Japan
- Planned: 13 March 1961
- Planned by: Joint Chiefs of Staff
- Commanded by: John F. Kennedy, Harry C. Aderholt, Winthrop G. Brown
- Objective: Establish airpower in Laos
- Date: March 21, 1961 – August 1961
- Executed by: USAF, CIA, PEO, Air America, RTAF, RLA
- Outcome: Aborted
- Casualties: Light damage from anti-aircraft while over Napé

Operation Millpond, which operated from 13 March 1961 through August 1961, was an American covert operation designed to introduce air power into the Laotian Civil War. A force of 16 B26s, 16 Sikorsky H-34s, and other materiel were hastily shipped in from Okinawa and held ready to operate from the Kingdom of Thailand. After this hasty preparation for bombing in Laos, the debacle at the Bay of Pigs invasion resulted in the cancellation of Millpond. The B-26s were returned to Okinawa. However, the precedent had been set for covert Central Intelligence Agency-sponsored air operations in Laos.

== Background ==
On 23 May 1950, the United States signed the Pentalateral Agreement committing military aid to French forces in the Kingdom of Laos. Two years later, America was carrying a third of the French costs of the First Indochina War. After the French withdrew from French Indochina, the U.S. picked up the entire Lao budget. After the 1954 Geneva Conference, an appearance of neutrality was preserved by posting "civilians" to military aid positions. When President John F. Kennedy received his incoming briefing on 19 January 1961, he was warned by outgoing President Dwight D. Eisenhower and Secretary of State Christian Herter that Laos was crucially located in Southeast Asia and must be maintained in the Free World. As a result of these circumstances, the burgeoning Laotian Civil War became a Central Intelligence Agency and U.S. State Department theater of operations. The new president soon approved several covert operations in Laos.

== Millpond operations ==
Joint Task Force 116, compiled from all branches of the U.S. military and based on Okinawa, had been alerted for action in Laos. Units of the Seventh Fleet were forwarded to the Gulf of Siam. At a 13 March 1961 meeting, President Kennedy approved recommendations made to him by the Joint Chiefs of Staff. The regnant materiel in the proposal was a small fleet of 16 B-26 light bombers, to be stationed in Thailand for aerial interdiction of communist supply lines in Laos. They were to be unmarked, and maintained by the CIA's wholly owned airline, Air America. Programs Evaluation Office officials had assured the president's military aide that the B-26s would suffice to chase the communists from the Plain of Jars. The B-26s would be accompanied by 16 Sikorsky H-34 helicopters, also for Air America use, also unmarked. Four C-130 Hercules, three Douglas DC-4s, and a Douglas C-47 were part of the anonymous package. The Royal Thai Army would covertly ship four batteries of 105mm howitzers to the Royal Lao Army. The existing advisory groups in Bangkok and Vientiane would be augmented with 100 more U.S. military men. Lastly, an additional 1,000 Hmong guerrillas would be trained by the CIA via Operation Momentum by 1 April. On 24 April, a RT-33 photo reconnaissance craft repurposed from the Philippine Air Force, but with a U.S. pilot, joined the effort under the code name Project Field Goal.

There followed a scramble for aircraft and volunteer air crews willing to operate in secrecy. The U.S. military, thus far restricted to using aerial rockets and machine guns, pressured for permission to use bombs and napalm. On 21 March 1961, the airlift of H-34s from Okinawa began; it ended on 24 March at Udorn Royal Thai Air Force Base with the turnover to Air America of 16 helicopters and a mixed bag of 37 U.S. Army, U.S. Marine Corps, and U.S. Navy pilots. The B-26 Invaders went to Takhli Royal Thai Air Force Base. Major Harry C. Aderholt, already active in covert airlift operations into Laos, supervised them.

By 3 April 1961 the Millpond B-26s were manned and ready to fly; another 16 were due on 18 April. Practice missions were flown in four flights of four B-26s apiece. Also on 3 April, 14 of the H-34s began helilift operations east of Vang Vieng, Laos. On 16 April 1961, the Millpond B-26 pilots were commissioned into the Royal Lao Air Force. Their aircraft were loaded with 250 pound bombs, rockets, ammunition, and napalm—though the latter was removed by order of Ambassador Winthrop G. Brown. They received an evening briefing, and were ready to fly in the morning. As it turned out, the debacle of the Bay of Pigs Invasion on the other side of the globe caused cancellation of the mission.

On 26 April, General Phoumi Nosavan of the Royal Lao Army urgently requested air strikes to ward off threatened communist assaults on Luang Prabang, Pakxan, Vientiane, and Savannakhet. Ambassador Brown did not want to scuttle an upcoming 12 May ceasefire, but felt he would order Millpond bombings if provoked by communist attacks. With this decision, he eliminated the top priority Millpond objective and took up the secondary one of supporting troops in contact. Meanwhile, the pilots were confined to the air base except for occasional photo reconnaissance by a camera-equipped RB-26. On the second of these, on 1 May, the Millpond RB-26 was damaged by 37mm antiaircraft fire over Napé on the Lao-Vietnamese border. The B-26s were then grounded. However, the Invaders never did fly a bombing sortie.

In August 1961, the Millpond B-26 force was dissolved and the operation cancelled, with the planes returned to Okinawa and the mixed crew of military and Air America pilots reverting to their former assignments. Despite this unpromising start by Millpond, covert CIA support was becoming the cornerstone of the burgeoning Laotian Civil War.
