= Phoumi Nosavan =

Laotian military leader (1920–1985)

- ພູມີ ຫນໍ່ສວັນ
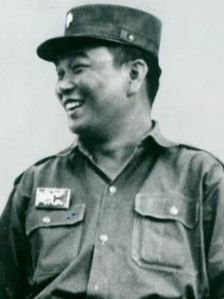
- Born: January 27, 1920; Savannakhet, Laos, French Indochina
- Died: November 3, 1985 (aged 65); Bangkok, Thailand
- Military career
- Branch: Royal Lao Army
- Service years: 1945–1965
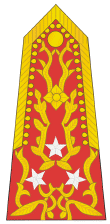
- Rank: Major general
- Known for: De facto leader of the Kingdom of Laos; In office (first): 25 December 1959–10 August 1960; Predecessor: Office established Successor: Kong Le; In office (second): 16 December 1960–1962; Predecessor: Kong Le; Successor: Office abolished Deputy Prime Minister of Laos; In office (first): 3 June 1960–10 August 1960; In office (second): 15 July 1962–Unknown Defense Minister of the Kingdom of Laos; In office: circa. 1962 Interior Minister of the Kingdom of Laos; In office: circa. 1962
- Conflicts: World War II; First Indochina War; Laotian Civil War
- Other work: Founding member of the Committee for the Defence of National Interests

Major General Phoumi Nosavan (Lao: ພູມີ ຫນໍ່ສວັນ; 27 January 1920 – 3 November 1985) was a Laotian military officer who served as the military strongman of Laos during the Laotian Civil War in the 1960s.

== Early life ==
Phoumi Nosavan was born in Savannakhet, the French Protectorate of Laos, on 27 January 1920. Originally a civil servant in the French colonial administration of Laos, he joined the resistance movement against the Japanese occupiers during the last year of World War II. He was exiled in 1946 due to his opposition to the French return to colonizing Laos. In early 1949, he returned to Laos to begin a military career after the collapse of the anti-French Lao Issara government. By 1955, he was Chief of Staff of the brand-new Royal Lao Army. While in that position, he was largely responsible for appointing senior officers into command positions in the Military Regions of Laos. Following that, in 1957, he was the first Lao officer to be schooled in France at the École de Guerre ('School of War'). While in France, he became acquainted with Central Intelligence Agency operative John F. "Jack" Hasey. Phoumi returned to Laos to become a founding member of the Committee for the Defence of National Interests on 17 June 1958. On 25 December 1959, he took control of the capital of Vientiane and the nation in a bloodless coup.

Drawing military power from his status as a general officer and political power from his appointment as defense minister, Phoumi would remain dominant in Laotian political life for the next six years. He would be temporarily removed from power during an August 1960 coup by Captain Kong Le, only to return with a Central Intelligence Agency backed counter-coup in December. From 1961 to 1963, he carried out military operations contrary to his American advisers' wishes, figuring the U.S. would have to support him regardless. His American backers periodically curtailed military aid to his forces to compel his compliance, even as the Royal Lao Army's performance deteriorated. The aftermath of the Battle of Vientiane in early 1961, as well as the disastrous Battle of Luang Namtha in 1962 and the lost Battle of Lak Sao in, illustrated his shortcomings as a military commander. Phoumi's influence was whittled away, so he attempted to retain power via coups, including one in 1964 and one in 1965. The 1964 coup being unsuccessful, he was stripped of his troop command. His final coup attempt in January 1965 was plotted with borrowed troops. When that bid to regain power failed, he fled into exile in the neighboring Kingdom of Thailand. He was sentenced in absentia to 20 years in prison. Phoumi Nosavan died in Bangkok in November 1985.

== Colonial Service ==
Phoumi Nosavan was a prominent Lao military and political figure of the Laotian Civil War. He was of Chinese Lao heritage. He was born in Savannakhet, the French Protectorate of Laos. He was educated there and in Vientiane. He became a civil servant in the French colonial government. As World War II wound down in 1945, he joined the resistance movement opposed to the Japanese occupation of Laos. He belonged to the secretive Lao Pen Lao ('Laos for the Lao'). He was also in the short-lived Lao Issara (Free Laos) government until the French return in 1946 drove him into exile in the Kingdom of Thailand. As part of the Lao Itsara ('Free Laos') command, he briefly ran their military operations in southern Laos in coordination with the Viet Minh.

In early 1949, he returned to Thailand before repatriating himself to Laos. In 1950 he joined the nascent Laotian National Army (Armee Nationale Laotienne) and served as a military adviser at the 1954 Geneva Conference. By 1955 he had risen to lieutenant colonel, serving as Chief of Staff of the newly constituted Royal Lao Army in the newly independent Kingdom of Laos.

== Service after independence ==
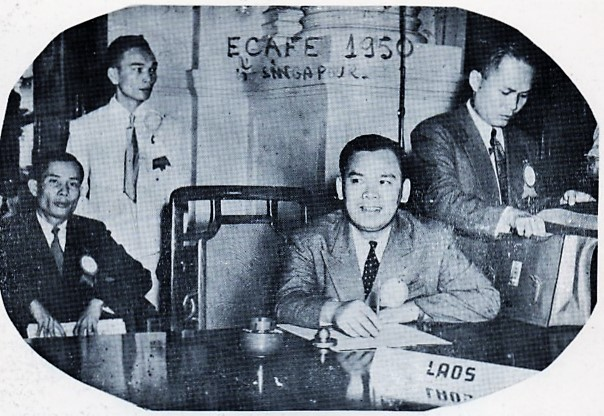
Phoumi (left, standing) with Kou Voravong at ESCAP conference, Singapore in 1950

Under Colonel Phoumi, there was a massive appointment of military officers subordinate to him into command positions in the Royal Lao Army. One of the criteria for these appointments was seniority in the military. However, the urban elite families were interested in procuring these command positions; they brought influence to bear to secure appointments for their family members or adherents. As the families were regionally based, officers from the elite both saw government service as a tool for political advancement and as another way to command the allegiance of the Lao peasantry in their region.

Phoumi then attended the Ecole de Guerre from 1957 to 1958; he was the first Lao officer to do so. He took Siho Lamphouthacoul as his aide de camp. While there, Phoumi became acquainted with Central Intelligence Agency operative John F. "Jack" Hasey. Phoumi returned from France to command the newly created Military Region 5; he added the political post of Deputy Minister for Internal Security. When the May 1958 national election results favored the communist candidates, the rightwing Committee for the Defence of National Interests was formed with American support on 17 June 1958 to counterbalance the leftists. Phoumi was a charter member of the CDNI.

Promoted to colonel, Phoumi joined Phoui Sananikone's government to assume the portfolio for national defense in 1959. On 4 September 1959, the Royal Lao Government appealed to the United Nations for an intervention against invasion by North Vietnamese communists. Sparked by a Washington Post article by Joseph Alsop, as well as a 5 September editorial by the paper, on 7 September, the United States pushed for a United Nations subcommittee of its Security Council be sent to Laos to investigate the charges of aggression against it. Also, on 7 September, Phoui proclaimed martial law even as his government insisted that "foreign invaders" had vacated Houaphanh Province. While Phoui made that announcement, Phoumi told the Associated Press (AP) that if the United Nations turned down the Lao request, the Royal Lao Government (RLG) would request help from the Southeast Asia Treaty Organization (SEATO). As the Laotian crisis began to gather skeptical coverage in the international press, Phoumi flew to Bangkok for a four-day visit. Once there, he solicited aid from his uncle, Field Marshal Sarit Thanarat. Sarit declined help unless Phoumi had American backing. The United Nations subcommittee visited Laos from 15 to 20 September; however, it received no persuasive proof of an invasion. In any case, neither the United Nations nor SEATO aid arrived. In mid-November, Secretary-General of the United Nations Dag Hammarskjöld visited Laos. He advised the Royal Lao Government that its policy should be strictly neutral if it is expected to receive support from the United Nations.

== Military rule ==
=== 1960 Laotian Coups ===
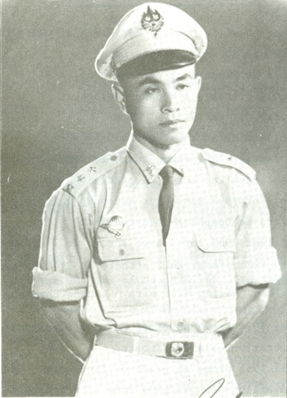
Captain Kong Le who ousted Phoumi in 1960

On 16 December 1959, Phoui fired the CDNI ministers from his cabinet, including Phoumi. On 25 December, General Phoumi took charge of the government in a bloodless coup, using Captain Kong Le and his 2nd Parachute Battalion (2e Bataillon de Parachutistes) to occupy Vientiane's infrastructure. The takeover had the approval of King Sisavang Vatthana; moreover, Phoumi was the only one chosen by his monarch for the new government. Phoumi believed he could impose an authoritarian "directed democracy" upon an ignorant populace for their welfare.

When the 1960 election results again favored leftists and communists, Phoumi founded the Pasa Sangkhom ('People's Society') political party on 12 May 1960 as a means of furthering his political ends. It was about this time he became friends with Thao Ma, head of the Royal Lao Air Force.

On 10 August 1960, Kong Le would oust Phoumi in his own coup. In return, Phoumi would return to power with the aid of the Central Intelligence Agency (including John Hasey) on 16 December in the Battle of Vientiane during his counter-coup. He was aided in this by Generals Kouprasith Abhay and Siho Lamphouthacoul. Phoumi reclaimed the Ministry of Defense after his counter-coup reclaimed the country, as well as becoming the deputy prime minister on 4 January 1961. He appointed his close friend Thao Ma to command the Royal Lao Air Force; he would act only on Phoumi's commands.

As Kong Le established his Neutralist Armed Forces in Military Region 2 as a third party in the Laotian Civil War, Phoumi ordered a pursuit. It moved slowly northward toward the Plain of Jars. On 13 March, a FAN counter-offensive quickly wiped out all the Royal Lao Army gains. To bolster Phoumi's forces, Operation Millpond was founded to secretively import American air power on the Royal Lao Government's side. Phoumi also tried to co-opt the Operation Momentum guerrillas, despite his dislike and distrust of the Hmong hill tribes.

Phoumi himself remained in Vientiane to maintain his control over the nation, and to organize the Royal Lao Army battalions into regiments during March 1961; the Royal Lao Air Force (RLAF) also received their first strike aircraft, in the form of four T-6 Texans. Phoumi rewarded his subordinate officers with promotions and appointments. He also promoted himself to Major general and began construction of a downtown monument in Vientiane celebrating his victory in the battle for control of the city. Meanwhile, President Dwight D. Eisenhower was so concerned that Phoumi might lose Laos to the communists that an American task force was placed on alert, and the Royal Thai Government was approached by the Americans as a source of reinforcements.

Phoumi meeting with Robert McNamara in 1961

The International Control Commission established by the 1954 Geneva Conference was renewed and engineered a truce on 11 May 1961, while the details of a new Lao government could be settled. On 19 June 1961, the three feuding princes met in Zürich, with Cambodian Prince Norodom Sihanouk mediating. On the 22nd, Prince Souphanouvong, Prince Souvanna Phouma, and Prince Boun Oum agreed in principle upon provisional rule by an interim Lao government until elections could be held. However, Phoumi stalled upon details of the coalition government, insisting upon knowing the composition of the new cabinet. He intended to stonewall it until he could foster a new government headed by King Sisavang Vatthana instead. His visit to Washington, DC after a Zürich meeting left him believing that the U.S. would back him, no matter what the circumstances. After his return to Laos, despite a ceasefire, troops under his command probed between Royal Lao Army and communist/Pathet Lao lines, retreating whenever they came up against the enemy. The communists fought them off, but did not retaliated.

Much to the despair of the American advisers attached to his forces, Phoumi preferred to promote officers known for their incompetence while demoting his competent officers as Phoumi feared able and intelligent officers might be able to overthrow him while inept and stupid officers never would. General William H. Craig of the U.S. Army wrote after visiting Laos in August-September 1961 that: "He is the only driving force in Laos but to make him function successfully, we must get tough with him". Craig wanted Phoumi to change his promotion policy to start promoting able officers at the expense of his inept appointees.

In late December, Phoumi accused the United States of a "defeatist policy", and of treating the Royal Lao Government "like a small child". There were months of wrangling concerning his role in the proposed coalition cabinet. On 25 March 1962, Phoumi, W. Averell Harriman, and Field Marshal Sarit Thanarat met in Nong Khai, Thailand. Sarit, who was kin to Phoumi, tried to convince him to join a coalition that split control of the military and police on three ways among the Royalists, Neutralists, and the Pathet Lao. When Phoumi would not accept, he was subjected to a heated tirade by Harriman. However, as the latter was under orders to not cut U.S. aid to Laos, he had no leverage and Phoumi remained obdurate. He would not accept that the Defense and Interior ministries should be occupied by neutralists instead of rightists.

=== Battle of Luang Namtha ===
Elsewhere in early 1962, skirmishing between the communists and the Royal Lao Army began on the Chinese border in far northwestern Laos in Luang Namtha. Phoumi directed his troops into the ensuing Battle of Luang Namtha in the beliefs that the possession of that border town could be settled by military means, and that his American backers would be forced to support his actions. For their part, the Americans favored a diplomatic or political solution to the border incursion. They suspended U.S. foreign military aid to Laos, including the payroll for the Royal Lao Army, to sway him to their point of view. Phoumi turned to a secretive source of income by deputizing General Ouane Rattikone to trade opium to generate the needed military funding.

In any case, the battle ended with the Royal Lao Army being trounced by half its number of communists. The Royal Lao Army's 150-kilometer (93 mi) retreat took it from the Lao/Chinese border to the Mekong River. The Royal Lao Government not only lost control of Luang Namtha; it also lost a third of its maneuver battalions, including its elite paratroops. The Royal Lao Government was forced by this defeat into the Second Coalition Government. Phoumi was forced to surrender his political posts as the Defense and Interior ministries, and was reduced to sharing the deputy prime minister post with the communist Prince Souphanouvong, with either having the right to veto cabinet decisions. After the Luang Namtha defeat, U.S. President John F. Kennedy wanted Phoumi out of politics, and strictly limited to a military role. President Kennedy directed Ambassador Winthrop G. Brown to make it known to Vientiane's politico-military elite that Phoumi no longer had the confidence of the U.S. for his political actions.

== Neutrality and additional coups ==
=== Neutrality ===
The International Agreement on the Neutrality of Laos was signed in July 1962; by its October deadline for foreign troop departure, it became apparent that at least 5,000 Vietnamese communists still remained in Laos.

In early 1963, during the lull that followed the establishment of national neutrality, Phoumi headquartered himself in Savannakhet. He ignored the International Agreement's proviso that he should disband his less able units. Instead, he beefed up the Royal Lao Army to almost 50,000 strong. He also quietly courted the FAN, airlifting supplies to them and urging them to ally with the Royalists. Despite the American acceptance of the FAN as allies, by 18 May 1963, Ambassador Leonard Unger performed a re-examination of Royalist forces. Because of their poor combat performance, Unger thought the Royal Lao Army and FAN would serve only to warn the government of communist attacks without offering significant resistance. However, the State Department ordered Unger to watch for opportunities for the Royal Lao Army to go on the offensive. In April, Phoumi arranged for the RLAF to receive eight T-28 Trojans from the Royal Thai Air Force. With U.S. State Department consent, the RLAF was strengthened by swapping in T-28s for worn-out T-6 Harvards on a one-to-one basis so the International Agreement was not breached. Whereas the T-6s had used only rockets and .30 caliber ammunition for strafing ground targets, the T-28s were cleared to carry and drop bombs. Additional transport craft were also supplied to the RLAF.

By November 1963, the positions of the FAN on the Plain of Jars needed reinforcement. In response, Royal Lao Army garrison troops were moved from Thakhek to Military Region 2. However, despite the resultant weakening of military forces in Military Region 3, Phoumi planned an offensive there. He thought that a thrust to the border village of Lak Sao would split a North Vietnamese intrusion. Phoumi found himself at odds with his American backers, who believed that an advance that would almost reach the border of the Democratic Republic of Vietnam would outrun supplies while inviting Vietnamese retaliation. When Phoumi did launch the assault, the ensuing Battle of Lak Sao would indeed end with the Royal Lao Army and its Neutralist allies dispersed in disarray by enemy counterattacks. The communists took back Lak Sao and also occupied the entire Nakay Plateau by 1 February 1964.

=== Further coups ===
On 18 April 1964, General Siho Lamphouthicoul, who had aided Phoumi's return to power in December 1960, sent his Directorate of National Coordination police to secure the streets of Vientiane. Phoumi sat out the short-lived coup, which was ended on 23 April by U.S. Ambassador Leonard Unger's orders to Siho and his co-conspirator Kouprasith Abhay. Despite Phoumi's non-participation, in the aftermath of the coup, Prime Minister Souvanna Phouma dismissed Phoumi as Defense Minister, depriving him of troops to command. However, Phoumi's brother still headed the Lao customs service, and diverted most customs fees for personal use. Siho and Kouprasith Abhay then demanded some share of Phoumi's illicit operations; opium, gold and liquor smuggling operations, as well as his prostitution and gambling concerns.

Despite his demotion, Phoumi had somehow retained control of a training battalion in Vientiane. On 4 August 1964, he used them to seize Vientiane. General Kouprasith promptly turned out his local troops to suppress the insurrection while Siho sat out the coup. The training battalion was disbanded, depriving Phoumi of his last troops under his command.

== Exile and death ==
On 27 January 1965, Phoumi managed to convince one of his adherents to order a transfer of troops from Military Region 2 to Vientiane to ward off a purported attack by MR 5 troops. His coup, and a simultaneous one by Bounleut Saycocie, both failed. Phoumi fled into exile in Thailand. In Laos, General Ouane Rattikone remained as the Royal Lao Army Chief of Staff. General Kouprasith Abhay held Vientiane and the surrounding Military Region 5. Junior officers were sent to head up units stationed on Phoumi's home ground of Savannakhet. Phoumi's birthday coup had failed because he had no troops to command.

Phoumi convinced a loyal subordinate to return to Vientiane and retrieve a cache of gold, which he used to settle into a comfortable retirement in Songkhla, Thailand. However, while still in Laos, Phoumi had shielded his friend Thao Ma from problems with competing generals. Now that he was in exile, Kouprasith Abhay, Ouane Rattikone, and Oudone Sananikone began conspiring to diminish Thao Ma's command; this led to the latter's 1966 coup.

Phoumi spent the 1970s in exile at Bangkok. He was sentenced by a Lao court in absentia to 20 years in prison. In 1981 he allowed the Thai-backed United Front for the Liberation of the Lao people to use his name. He remained in exile, eventually dying in Bangkok in 1985.

== See also ==
- Laotian Civil War
- Royal Lao Army Airborne
- Royal Lao Armed Forces

== Sources ==
- Ahern, Thomas L. Jr. (2006), Undercover Armies: CIA and Surrogate Warfare in Laos. Center for the Study of Intelligence. Classified control no. C05303949.
- Anthony, Victor B. and Richard R. Sexton (1993). The War in Northern Laos. Command for Air Force History. OCLC 232549943.
- Fall, Bernard Anatomy of a Crisis: The Laotian Crisis of 1960-1961. Garden City, New York: Doubleday. 1969.
- Castle, Timothy N. (1993). At War in the Shadow of Vietnam: U.S. Military Aid to the Royal Lao Government 1955–1975. Columbia University Press. ISBN 0-231-07977-X.
- Conboy, Kenneth and James Morrison (1995). Shadow War: The CIA's Secret War in Laos. Paladin Press. ISBN 0-87364-825-0.
- Kaplan, Lawrence S.; Landa, Ronald Dean; Drea, Edward (2006). The McNamara Ascendancy, 1961-1965. Washington D.C.: Historical Office, Office of the Secretary of Defense. ISBN 0160753694.
- Stuart-Fox, Martin (2008) Historical Dictionary of Laos. Scarecrow Press. ISBNs 0810864118, 978-0-81086-411-5.
- Warner, Roger (1995). Back Fire: The CIA's Secret War in Laos and Its Link to the War in Vietnam. Simon & Schuster. ISBNs 0-68480-292-9, 978-06848-0292-3.
