= Unity (military operation) =

- Part of the Laotian Civil War and the Vietnam War
- Type: Covert military assistance and reinforcement
- Location: Kingdom of Laos
- Planned by: RTA Headquarters 333, CIA Joint Liaison Detachment
- Commanded by: Royal Thai Army, CIA, Laotian Royalists
- Objective: Support the Kingdom of Laos through the supply of mercenary and other military units
- Date: September 1958—22 February 1973
- Executed by: Royal Thai Army, CIA, Laotian Royalists
- Outcome: Reinforced by soldiers from Thailand; ceasefire in on 22 February 1973 ends the program
- Casualties: 350 Thais and at least 30 civilians killed Over 1,000 Thais injured

Unity or Project Unity was the codename for Thailand's covert supply of mercenary soldiers to the Kingdom of Laos during the Laotian Civil War. From 4 July 1964 until March 1973, battalions of Thai volunteers fought Communist Pathet Lao insurgents on the Plain of Jars in Military Region 2. As the Hmong "Secret Army" (French: Armée Clandestine) was sapped by ongoing casualties and a limited basis for replacements, Unity battalions replaced them.

By December 1970, Unity battalions also began defensive operations against People's Army of Vietnam (PAVN) units pushing westward from the Ho Chi Minh trail in the southern Laotian panhandle. By the time the North Vietnamese defeated the Royalists in February 1973, about 18,000 Thai volunteers were serving in Laos.

== Overview ==
The Kingdom of Thailand was placed in a delicate position during the Second Indochina War. The Kingdom of Laos was a buffer state between the People's Republic of China and the Democratic Republic of Vietnam and Thailand, which prevented their possible domination of the Thais. Laos also served as a buffer from the fighting in the Vietnam War. However, the Thai–Lao border of the Mekong River was easily breached. As a result, there was a consensus among Thais that communist encroachment should be stopped short of Thai territory. As an open effort would attract Chinese attention, the Thai government elected covert participation in the ongoing Laotian Civil War. The Police Aerial Reinforcement Unit (PARU) of the Border Patrol Police (BPP) became the liaison agents for that.

== Background ==
As early as September 1958, the Royal Thai Army (RTA) began training Lao troops at Camp Erawan in Thailand. In April 1961, the first training camp in Thailand for Lao recruits opened in northeast Thailand; this effort was codenamed "Project Ekarad". The RTA created a new command, designated Headquarters 333 (HQ 333) to control its covert operations involving Laos. The Central Intelligence Agency (CIA) formed a Joint Liaison Detachment to coordinate its activities with HQ 333. Thai pilots and aviation specialists were also supplied sub rosa to the Royal Lao Air Force (RLAF).

=== Special Requirement units ===
On 4 July 1964, in preparation for a Laotian offensive codenamed Operation Triangle, a Royal Thai Army (RTA) artillery battalion of 279 men was flown from Korat, Thailand to the Plain of Jars in Laos. Equipped with a 155mm and five 105mm howitzers, the Thai battalion was emplaced to support Kong Le's Neutralist Armed Forces (French: Forces Armées Neutralistes – FAN). The request for the Thai unit was referred to as Project 008 and when the first battalion was deployed, the unit received the designation of "Special Requirement 1".

In early 1966, the Thai Prime Minister Thanom Kittikachorn called for volunteers to serve in South Vietnam. There was an enthusiastic response from the male populace, with over 5,000 recruits coming from Bangkok alone. It seems that this mobilization – which resulted in U.S.-funded Royal Thai Army troops landing in South Vietnam in 1967 – helped to conceal the diversion of some of the recruited troops to Laos.

Succeeding Special Requirement units served as reinforcements of FAN forces stationed at the forward all-weather airstrip of Muang Soui. During the Campaign Toan Thang on 24 June 1969, when People's Army of Vietnam (PAVN) troops had scattered FAN troops, Special Requirement 8's 317 men manned its guns and managed to held its ground. An evacuation of FAN civilian dependents via helicopter sapped the Neutralist will to fight, and they abandoned Moung Soui. Encircled and outnumbered by their attackers, under tank and artillery fire, the senior Thai officer at the site had to be ordered to withdraw. On 26 June, the Thais were heli-lifted out in Operation Swan Lake and Special Requirement 8 was disbanded upon its return to Thailand.

The Hmong "Secret Army" fought three successful campaigns during 1969: Operation Raindance, Operation Off Balance, and Kou Kiet. However, by the end of the latter operation, the "Secret Army" had dwindled from 5,500 to 5,000 Hmong guerrillas, which were faced by 22,000 PAVN troops. The Hmong manpower pool was nearly dry, as only teenagers and aging men were still available. By comparison, there was an essentially bottomless pool of 10,000 replacements per year available for the North Vietnamese.

During the North Vietnamese Campaign 139, which threatened the very existence of Vang Pao's "Secret Army", 300 Thai artillerymen of Special Requirement 9 were sent to Long Tieng. They arrived on 18 March 1970, when Vang Pao's reserves were reduced to aircraft mechanics and bandsmen. They were followed in April by the RTA's 13th Regimental Combat Team, committed to a year's service in Laos. To "disguise" their assignment to Vang Pao's forces, the three infantry battalions, the new artillery battalion, and Special Requirement 9 were redesignated with French names as Royal Lao Army (RLA) units, being collectively known as the "Task Force Vang Pao". Upon arrival, they established two fire support bases to house their artillery. As the summer progressed, units that had been transferred in from other Military Regions rotated to their home bases, and the Thai infantry battalions replaced them in their strongholds.

== Beginnings ==
In the wake of Lon Nol's ascension to the leadership of the Khmer Republic in early June 1970, the Royal Thai Government (RTG) raised 5,000 volunteer recruits to serve there, and began training them. On 9 September, it was publicly announced that Thailand had decided not to send troops to Cambodia after all. Undisclosed was the secret negotiations between the United States and Thailand concerning the cost and use of those troops. When Lieutenant general Richard G. Stilwell claimed that the U.S. budget for training and equipping those troops could pay for retraining the entire RTA instead, he was overridden. The Department of Defense (DoD) would fund the redirection of these volunteers to Laos under the codename "Unity".

The CIA would train and run the Unity program. The volunteers were used to fill nine infantry battalions and an artillery battalion. Each infantry battalion would be filled with 495 recruits on a one-year tour of duty. A Unity battalion would be staffed by a cadre of 22 trainers and 33 medical specialists from the Royal Thai Army. The very size of the projected Unity force was a decided escalation in Thailand's commitment to the Laotian Civil War. The Unity training program was moved to a larger base near Kanchanaburi, Thailand, capable of housing four battalions at a time. There the Thai recruits were trained by a staff of 44 U.S. Special Forces (USSF) instructors. Meanwhile, both the RTG and the U.S. were so enthusiastic about Unity, that they contemplated an expansion of the program even beyond the ten-fold increase in progress.

== Organization ==
=== Training and deployment ===
The first two battalions of these Thai mercenary volunteers were trained by early December 1970. With a dozen Royal Thai Special Forces (RTSF) as leavening in the cadre, the new units were deemed ready for service. The RLG, which had not been party to establishing Unity, now set conditions on the Thai deployment into Laos. The Thais had to be used in active operations, and they had to be far from the international press corps in Vientiane. Also, the battalions had to be disguised by being redesignated as "Commando Battalions" (French: Bataillons Commando – BC) to conform with the RLA custom. Numbered BC 601 and BC 602 respectively, the new battalions inaugurated the practice of numbering the Thai mercenary units in the 600 series while they were in Lao service.

In June 1972, in an effort to boost recruitment for the Unity program, Thai volunteers without prior military training were accepted for service in Laos. The Unity force ballooned from a strength of 14,028 in June to 21,413 in September.

=== Military Region 4 ===
On 15 December 1970, BC 601 and BC 602 were heli-lifted to the abandoned village of Houei Sai in Laos, to begin military operations in Military Region 4. Operating under the codename Virakom, they were so successful that CIA case officers, noting the contrast with the Khmer troops serving under Project Copper, thought the Thais might recapture the Boloven Plateau for them.

On 27 July 1971, Unity troops were committed to Operation Sayasila, an attempt to recapture the vital airstrip at Salavan. Later in 1971, they would participate in similar offensives such as Operation Bedrock and Operation Thao La. By December, the PAVN was pressuring the Royalists with offensive operations designed to push them away from the Ho Chi Minh trail and backwards toward Thailand.

By June 1972, Royalist defenses in the southern Laotian panhandle had been beaten back, with some PAVN troops being able to push towards the Mekong River border area between Laos and Thailand. Unity troops found themselves being shuttled between Military Regions 2 and 4 to fend off the increasing North Vietnamese pressure. The Royalist Black Lion offensives – Operations Black Lion, Black Lion III, and Black Lion V – were waged from 15 June 1972 through 22 February 1973 in a vain attempt to stave off defeat, with the Thai mercenaries making up most of the Royalist fighting force.

=== Military Region 2 ===
The Royalists faced many difficulties in Military Region 2. Fire Support Base Puncher, the Ban Na outpost of Long Tieng, was surrounded by PAVN infantry and sappers. On 14 February 1971, an accidental bombing killed 30 civilians and by 15 February, Vang Pao's "Secret Army" was in a desperate situation. The PAVN were within striking distance of the main guerrilla base at Long Tieng. The next two Unity Battalions, BCs 603 and 604, were pulled from the final stages of training and sent to reinforce the Hmong irregulars. To maintain unit cohesion, the Thais had to fend off Vang Pao's attempts to parcel out the platoons of Thai replacements into the Hmong guerrilla units, since the Thais were trained to fight cohesively as mobile offensive troops, and they intended to retain that capability.

On 3 March, the first Thai battalions arrived at Long Tieng. Unity troops held the line through March, so that the PAVN could not overrun Long Tieng and win the war before the rainy season quashed operations.

Unity battalions continued to be transferred to MR 2. The Thais recaptured the advanced fighter base at Muang Soui by late September 1971 and they had also set up a network of artillery fire support bases with mutually interlocking fields of fire across the expanse of the Plain of Jars to defend it against the PAVN.

Also in late September, the Unity forces had increased to the point where they rated their medical evacuation support. Ten UH-1M helicopter gunships were acquired and stationed at Udorn RTAFB, with 26 Thai pilots being trained to fly them. As many as six of the helicopters would fly north daily to the Plain, responding to the callsign "White Horse".

By the end of 1971, when the North Vietnamese launched Campaign Z, the Thai troops included in the "Secret Army" had largely replaced the original Hmong guerrillas. Although the PAVN combined arms assault initially overran six Thai strongpoints, the Thai defense of the vital base at Long Tieng narrowly saved the Royalists from losing the war. The Thais also formed the backbone of the Operation Strength I and Operation Strength II, Royalist counter-offensives held between February and March 1972. By May 1972, the Hmong manpower pool was so diminished that a CIA paramilitary adviser noted that his newly recruited battalion of guerrillas contained over 100 youths under 17 years of age, with about a dozen being 12 or younger. Indeed, with six percent of the Laotian population under arms, the Royalists were running low on potential soldiers, regardless of their ethnic background. As a result, the Unity force supplied most of the manpower for Operation Phou Phiang II and Operation Phou Phiang III. The last of the Thai battalions would remain in the field through the 22 February 1973 ceasefire, withdrawing later in March.

== Aftermath ==
In contrast to the 11,000 Thai troops who served in South Vietnam, as many as 22,000 Thais may have served in Laos by 1971, and casualty figures are reported as 350 killed, and over 1,000 wounded. When the ceasefire in Laos came to effect on 22 February 1973, Unity forces consisted of 27 infantry and three artillery battalions, along with six heavy weapons' companies, organized into three task forces. Total strength then stood at 17,808 troops, but when the fighting ended, desertions began to occur. Within a month, Thai strength had dropped to 14,900 men as the volunteers filtered south looking for fresh employment and by mid-year, Unity had dwindled to 10,000 soldiers. These were withdrawn from Laos during the following year. Although there was some thought of redirecting a few Unity troops into the Cambodian theater of operations, they were eventually discharged, bringing the entire program to an end.

== See also ==
- Cambodian Civil War
- Khmer National Armed Forces (FANK)
- Laotian Civil War
- List of weapons of the Laotian Civil War
- Royal Lao Armed Forces
- Royal Lao Army
- Thailand in the Vietnam War
- Vietnam War
