= Operation Sinsay =

- Part of Laotian Civil War; Vietnam War
| Date | 11 February – 31 March 1972 |
| Location | Rear of Communist forces on the Ho Chi Minh trail |
| Territorial changes | No significant change: Royalist guerrillas cut supply lines of attacking North Vietnamese, force a retreat |

Belligerents
| Kingdom of Laos; Supported by United States | North Vietnam; Supported by: Soviet Union; People's Republic of China |

Units involved
| (Laos) Groupement Mobile 42; Bataillon Commando 613, Bataillon Commando 614, Thai artillery contingent, Groupement Mobile 41, Groupement Mobile 42, Groupement Mobile 43 | 9th PAVN Regiment, 39th PAVN Regiment |

Strength
| Regimental-strength | Regimental-strength |

Casualties and losses
| Unknown | Unknown |

Operation Sinsay (11 February – c. 31 March 1972) was a Royal Lao Government offensive of the Laotian Civil War. The planned offensive was pre-empted by prior moves by the opposing People's Army of Vietnam (PAVN); they struck on 6 March 1972. Although the Communist attack reached Laongam, 21 kilometers from Pakxe and the Thai border, and the defending Royalist battalions there were reassigned to fight in Operation Strength on the Plain of Jars, monarchist guerrillas were able to interdict Communist supply lines and force a Vietnamese retreat by the end of March 1972.

== Overview ==
The Ho Chi Minh Trail was central to the People's Army of Vietnam (PAVN) strategy for the conquest of South Vietnam during the Second Indochina War. When a series of nine CIA-sponsored incursions from Military Region 3 (MR 3) and Military Region 4 (MR 4) of the southern panhandle of the Kingdom of Laos during 1969 and 1970 failed to interdict the Trail, the massive Operation Lam Son 719 was staged on 8 February 1971 to cut it. In the wake of this failure, CIA backed Laotian guerrillas and Royal Lao Government military irregulars made further attempts at severing the logistical lines of communication.

== Background ==
When Operation Thao La ended in December 1971, Royal Lao Government (RLG) forces had only a tenuous hold on the Bolovens Plateau in Military Region 4 of Laos. The Royalist front line was at Ban Gnik, and was manned by a regiment, Groupement Mobile 42 (GM 42). In mid-January 1972, GM 42 was overrun and slaughtered by the 9th Regiment of the People's Army of Vietnam (PAVN). Continuing westward toward Thailand, the PAVN regiment descended from the Plateau towards Pakxe. The RLG hastily improvised a new front line at Laongam from three Thai mercenary units—Bataillon Commando 613 (BC 613), Bataillon Commando 614 (BC 614), and a Thai artillery fire base. Plagued by 165 cases of malaria, and drained by 300 desertions, the Thai contingent managed to hold the position just 21 kilometers from the Thai border.

== Activities ==
On 11 February 1972, three Royal Lao Army (RLA) battalions were selected for Operation Sinsay (Operation Victory). Their objective was the recapture of Ban Ngik. An attempt was made to airlift in the first 53 troops to begin the operation, but it was turned back by foul flying weather and enemy opposition.

On 6 March, the PAVN began moving westward toward Thailand along Lao Route 23. The Thai fire base, fearing Communist infiltration behind the Royalist front lines, retired to the junction of Routes 13 and 23 on the Mekong River bank. On 8 March, two PAVN battalions reinforced by T-34 tanks pushed the Thai battalions out of Laongam and back upon the fire base. At about the same time, the PAVN 39th Regiment sent two battalions forth from Salavan in a southwestern anti-clockwise move around the base of the Plateau.

On 9 March, the 2nd and 4th battalions of 39th Regiment arrived at the Houei Champi River. A 122mm artillery detachment, an anti-aircraft company, and three 85mm field guns accompanying the two battalions encamped there. The infantry battalions aimed to cross the river to a position 13 kilometers distant overlooking the Thai artillery from the north.

With MR 4's headquarters at Pakxe being threatened, as well as Thai sovereignty, the two Thai battalions were transferred away northward to fight in Operation Strength in Military Region 2 (MR 2), leaving the Thai artillery on its own on 10 March. On 11 March, GM 41 from Khong Sedone arrived at Ban Kenggnao on Route 231 behind the 39th Regiment troops. On 12 March, the Royalists destroyed three PAVN truckloads of artillery ammunition and 122mm rockets. With their supplies cut off by GM 41's interdiction of the Route 231 line of communication, the PAVN battalions were forced onto the defensive. One battalion dropped back to Houei Champi to secure the artillery, while the other attacked Ban Kenggao. This obviated the threat to Pakxe.

On 15 March 1972, the 1,100 guerrillas of GM 43 were airlifted on to the Plateau's northern edge, being landed 14 kilometers south of Lao Ngam. The regiment struck westwards, also interdiction Route 231. One of its battalions took heavy casualties at a river crossing as it pushed southwest toward GM 41. The 39th Regiment, caught in the middle, was forced to withdraw eastward back towards Vietnam.

However, the PAVN 9th Regiment still clung to Route 23, and MR 4 had no available troops to challenge them. The RLA was stretched to its limits supporting the Operation Strength counter to Campaign Z. The only available reinforcements for MR 4 were two battalions from neighboring MR 3. They were flown via C-130 from Savannakhet to Pakxe, then trucked forward to the Thai artillery base during the third week of March. From there, they walked eastward along Route 23 for the next 12 days, overcoming light Communist resistance. The imported battalions captured their objective at Laongam for three days before retreating to Pakxe and being shipped back whence they came.

== Result ==
The Royalists kept a tenuous hold on the Route 23 line of communication, preventing the PAVN from occupying it.

== Aftermath ==
Another RLG offensive was planned as a followup to drive the PAVN back along Route 23 into Vietnam.
