= Operation Sayasila =

- Part of Laotian Civil War; Vietnam War
Date	26 July 1971 – 31 October 1971
Location	Southern Laos
Result	see Aftermath section
Territorial changes	Kingdom of Laos captures Salavan and Pak Song

Belligerents
Kingdom of Laos; Forces Armées Neutralistes; Supported by Thailand; United States	North Vietnam

Commanders and leaders
Sisavang Vatthana; Souvanna Phouma; Thao Ty; Phasouk Somly	N/A

Strength
Over 4,000	1,100

Casualties and losses
136 killed 302 wounded	~170

Operation Sayasila (26 July 1971—31 October 1971) was a major offensive military operation of the Laotian Civil War. It was staged by command of King Sisavang Vatthana. Launched on 26 July 1971 against the Ho Chi Minh Trail complex and its People's Army of Vietnam (PAVN) garrison, Sayasila was planned as a rather complex two phase operation dependent on coordinating two columns containing 4,400 troops with close air support in an attack on 1,100 Vietnamese Communist soldiers. When the assault stalled in mid-August, it was elaborated upon with two additional helilifts of Royalist troops behind the PAVN's mobile garrison. When the Royalist command failed to coordinate tactical movements among its various columns, the PAVN 9th Regiment moved to defeat Royalist aggressor columns one at a time. By 1 September, this Royalist attack had also failed.

Bolstered by a fresh regiment of guerrillas as reinforcements, plus support by a minimum of 40 daily U.S. Air Force strike sorties, the Operation Sayasila offensive was renewed on 10 September 1971. It took until 20 October for the Royalists to finally capture their objectives of Salavan and Pak Song. Although the Royal Lao Government (RLG) troops had finally gained their objective, their casualties outnumbered the enemy force they evicted from their objectives. The U.S. government, which was supporting the RLG, placed restrictions on U.S. support aimed at limiting the RLG to defensive efforts.

== Overview ==
Beginning in 1964, the strategic importance of the Ho Chi Minh Trail became paramount to the People's Army of Vietnam as its key to conquering South Vietnam. Over the next seven years, the Trail expanded to 4,000 miles of road, trail, and waterway. Tchepone in the Kingdom of Laos became a key logistics and transshipment center for the communists. Its importance can be measured by the fact that among the many attempts to cut the Trail, the multi-divisional Operation Lam Son 719 was launched on 8 February 1971 to capture Tchepone.

== Background ==
Operation Phiboonpol had ended in an indecisive standoff, despite heavy Communist casualties. Military Region 4's (MR 4) Commanding Officer General Phasouk Somly was hesitant to try another attack because of the poor fighting qualities of his troops. However, on 1 July 1971, King Sisavang Vatthana paid a royal visit to Pakse and demanded another offensive. Thus it was that Pakse Unit of the Central Intelligence Agency (CIA) planned an offensive into communist territory on the eastern Bolovens Plateau designed to block one of the supply arteries of the Ho Chi Minh Trail, Route 23. It would also retake two airstrips while occupying the Bolovens Plateau. The plan was for a two phase operation involving not just troops from Pakse's (MR 4), but also from adjoining Military Region 3 (MR 3). As projected, the Royalist force of 11 battalions numbered 4,000 strong; the opposing three Communist battalions could muster barely 1,100 troops. In phase one, MR 3's guerrillas would be airlifted to capture the Pakse 47 airfield southwest of Salavan at UTM coordinates XC5237. Phase two would be a squeeze play; a mobile force would be airlifted to a position northwest of Paksong, while a column probed eastward toward it along Route 23. The Royal Lao Air Force (RLAF) would supply close air support at the rate of two AC-47 and 35 T-28 sorties daily. Belatedly, the planners realized that RLAF support would be insufficient. Three days before the operation's scheduled start, they requested and received a commitment for 12 daily sorties of tactical air for the next month. The U.S. Air Force (USAF) would fly interdiction strikes on the communist lines of communication with fighter-bombers by day and gunships by night. However, USAF support would not be on a dedicated basis; instead it would be diverted as needed. Logistical air support would come from USAF helicopters, RLAF transports, and Air America under contract. Not taken into account was that the Royalist columns were not mutually supportive. General Minh, commander of the PAVN battalions, would use this flaw to defeat the Royalists in detail by using his interior lines of communication.

== Activities ==
=== Phase one ===
On 26 July 1971, MR 3's Groupement Mobile 31 (GM 31) stood down from a planned heliborne insertion into Salavan in Military Region 4. It seems that Secretary of Defense Melvin Laird had sent an order down through the Department of Defense to ground the U.S. helicopters. After vigorous protests from the CIA concerning the humiliation of failing to fulfill the King's and the Prime Minister's wishes, the helilift was re-approved. The plea that diversionary operations were already being launched, and that failure to follow through would prejudice Lao military efforts against the Ho Chi Minh Trail carried the day.

Before the next dawn, a Commando Raiders team secured the Salavan airfield in 12 minutes. At 07:00 hours, a 13 helicopter air armada picked up the 1,290 man regiment for the half-hour flight to the airfield. Tactical air cover found no worthwhile targets as the irregular regiment occupied a town vacated by the People's Army of Vietnam (PAVN) by 08:30. At noon, the Royalists controlled the town. Phase one had been accomplished by the afternoon of 28 July 1971. The PAVN troops had slipped away to attack the Royalist contingent that had landed northwest of Pak Song. They would return on 25 August to defeat this contingent of Royalists.

=== Phase two ===
==== Heliborne assault on Paksong ====
Phase two fell to MR 4 troops with support via surveillance overflights by Raven FACs. At 09:20 hours on 29 July, Bataillon Volontaires 41 (BV 41) was helilifted out of Pakse and deposited 34 kilometers northeastward to the Bolovens Plateau. Batillion Volontaires 43 (BV 43) joined them later that day. After a patch of ill weather delays in flight operations, Bataillon Infanterie 4 (BI 4) joined them, bringing the Royalist roster to 1,250 troops available. On 30 July, the combined units moved out to the east; their objective was Paksong at UTM XB3377. Nine kilometers northwest of Paksong, they were halted by a PAVN battalion.

By 6 August, the Royalists were within six kilometers of their objective. On 11 August, they then ran into determined communist counterattacks that drove the monarchists almost back to their landing zone. On 25 August, the Royalists made another attempt at taking Paksong. They were counterattacked by three PAVN battalions at 1330 hours. By dark, the scattered Royalist forces had suffered 32 dead, 39 wounded, and 192 missing in action. PAVN casualties were estimated at 100 killed. After this thrashing, the three Royal Lao Army battalions were then ordered south to Ban Phakkout.

Three battalions of guerrillas were pulled from training to plug the gap left by the retreating Royalist regulars; a fourth battalion was posted to fill the force out to regimental size.

==== Push along Route 23 ====
Meanwhile, on 30 July two Forces Armées Neutralistes (FAN) battalions moved east along Route 23 for the squeeze play. They were supported by four armored cars and backed by a Thai mercenary artillery battery. With tactical air strikes and howitzer fire clearing the way, the Neutralists were in Ban Gnik by evening. However, there they met opposition and halted.

Reinforced by Bataillon Infanterie 7 (BI 7) from MR 4 and Bataillon Infanterie 9 (BI 9) from MR 3, the Royalists pushed on down the road, gaining Ban Phakkout on 6 August 1971.

MR 4 had a Thai mercenary task force assigned; it now forwarded four battalions to Ban Phakkout. On 8 August, BI 7 and BI 9 moved further east until they came up against entrenched North Vietnamese regulars. The FAN battalions moved up to help the Royalists. There followed a ten-day standoff, ended when the communists brought heavy weapons on line. On 18 August, under heavy weapons fire, the two Neutralist and two Royalist battalions scattered to the southwest. With both prongs of the Royalist offensive thwarted, it was time to regroup.

=== Regroup and restart ===
The original plan of attack was elaborated upon. The new plan called for three Royalist and two Thai mercenary battalions to push down Route 23 toward Vietnam. The push on Paksong would be carried out by a pair of converging columns. Two battalions each of Thai mercenaries, Royalist regulars, and Neutralists were helicoptered to a landing zone south of Paksong, with orders to capture it. Four battalions of Royalist guerrillas were lifted to another landing zone to assault Paksong from the northwest for a coordinated attack.

The revamped offensive restarted on 21 August. The drive up Route 23 came up against a PAVN bunker complex blocking the road. While most of the tactical air sorties assigned to the operation struck the bunkers, they failed to dislodge the Communists. The two Royalist columns converging on Paksong failed to synchronize their actions. As a result, the PAVN 9th Regiment could fight them in turn. First, it scattered the four Royalist battalions south of them into the bush, and pushed the two Thai battalions back toward Ban Phakkout. Then it intercepted the four guerrilla battalions five kilometers northwest of Paksong. It struck them so hard the four battalions were evacuated for refitting. By 1 September, the failure of this Royalist offensive was evident.

Presented with the choice of making another try at capturing Paksong quickly before the rainy season closed down military activities, or waiting until next dry season, the planners of Sayasila decided to ask for help with the former. They garnered a commitment of 40 or more daily sorties of tactical air support from the U.S. Air Force for Sayasila through 25 September. Instrument flight rules target boxes containing no friendly forces were delineated so radar-directed bombing in them could occur despite unfavorable weather. They also managed to persuade neighboring MR 3 to loan them another guerrilla regiment, Groupement Mobile 32 (GM 32) to continue the assault. Once again, the two objectives were taking Paksong and opening Route 23 towards the Vietnamese border.

==== Paksong ====
On 10 September, a pathfinder unit of Commando Raiders secured a landing zone six kilometers east of Paksong. GM 32 landed to be greeted by sniper fire. The Royalist regiment advanced despite a glancing engagement with the PAVN 9th Regiment that caused 33 Royalist casualties. By the next morning GM 32 had secured a position on the Phou Theveda high ground athwart Route 232, four kilometers east of Paksong. The following day, 12 September, a levy of 670 reinforcements cobbled together from three different commands were flown into a landing zone seven kilometers southeast of Paksong. They attacked northwards to back up GM 32. On 13 September, GM 32 repelled PAVN counterattacks.

At 2330 hours 14 September, forward elements of GM 32 captured Paksong. The PAVN 9th Regiment, threatened from the south, east, and west, withdrew to the northeast along Route 23 on the 15th. A few PAVN soldiers still remained secreted in Paksong for GM 32 to grub out. Seven kilometers from town they posted a rear guard to fortify a hilltop position overwatching the road. Leaving another contingent in the agricultural research station, the 9th retreated toward Thateng. Political pressure from Vientiane was being brought to bear on the operation's commanding officer, as the Royal Lao Armed Forces had suffered almost 1,000 casualties in the past two months in MR 4.

==== Route 23 ====
On 11 September, the Thai mercenary artillery battery opened fire from Ban Gnik, immobilizing the Communists further east on Route 23 with a barrage of 500 shells. GM 32 moved east along the road with close air support clearing the way. By the 13th, all five of the Thai howitzers had been shifted forward to more effective firing positions at Ban Phakkout. Four Thai mercenary infantry battalions pushed toward an agricultural research station along Route 23. They just missed intercepting the retreating 9th PAVN Regiment. On the 20th, the Thais began a three-day struggle to gain possession of the agricultural research station alongside Route 23. Once it was gained on the 23rd, howitzers were moved in.

== Phase one revisited ==
On 28 August, GM 31 were replaced at Salavan by BV 41. This freed GM 31 to advance 20 kilometers west along Route 16 before moving south to capture Lao Ngam on 2 September. BV 41 occupied the vicinity for more than three weeks, but uncovered few enemy supply caches. At about the time BV 41 was due to be withdrawn, the 927th PAVN Battalion moved in close enough to begin mortaring GM 31. When BV 41 received orders for a fresh offensive instead of relief, 130 soldiers deserted and returned to Pakse.

GM 31 was moved to a quiet village ten kilometers away. General Thao Ty convinced them to hold their position until 6 October. He promised relief by FAN battalions. When on the day only four FAN companies showed up, the remainder of GM 31 abandoned their positions.

== Denouement ==
The pincer movement of the original Sayasila plan had bogged down after GM 32 took Paksong. It would not progress until 18 October, when the regiment advanced westward from Paksong in response to Communist shelling of the Paksong airstrip. Thai mercenary troops further east on Route 23 pushed toward GM 32, and the pincers finally met on 20 October. Leaving the Thais in charge of Route 23, GM 32 returned to occupy Paksong.

=== Operation Red Arrow ===
On 26 October, a Thai mercenary battalion swept south and east of Paksong, reoccupying the Phou Thevada high ground.

=== Operation Phou Xang ===
Another Thai battalion swept northwards from Paksong, occupying the high ground at Phou Nongkin.

== Results ==
Operation Sayasila ended on 31 October 1971. The Royal Lao Armed Forces suffered 136 of its troops killed during the offensive, and 302 wounded. PAVN losses were estimated at 170. However, the Royalists had won the airstrips at Salavan and Paksong. This cleared the way for two follow-up offensive moves, Operation Bedrock and Operation Thao La. However, with a Royalist casualty list that outnumbered the PAVN opposition, it was a dubious victory. Eight Royalist battalions had been rendered unfit for service. The CIA's Chief of Station in MR 4 believed that the failure of Sayasila resulted from several Royalist weaknesses. He blamed the Royalist regulars for poor battle performance. He believed the new commanding general did not yet have a strong command relationship with his subordinates. He also noted that the extensive slow-paced movements by the Royalists gave the PAVN a lot of time to scout out intelligence about the Royalists.

Given that the American plan for waging the Laotian Civil War was a defensive one, the American ambassador had run counter to policy by approving an offensive drive. This provoked a reaction from his superiors. The short notice request for additional USAF tactical air support had brought about a directive on 18 August that requests for tactical air support for a planned operation had to be submitted at least ten days in advance. In reality, the process would take 20 to 30 days. The directive, issued by the Joint Chiefs of Staff and agreed to by both the CIA and the State Department, required coordination of planned operations with both 7th Air Force and CINCPAC. These requirements were meant to limit offensives under the guise of coordination.

== Aftermath ==
By New Year's Day 1972, although Pak Song remained in Royalist hands, Salavan had been recaptured by the PAVN. The Communists still controlled the eastern Bolovens Plateau as a territorial shield protecting the Ho Chi Minh Trail.
