= Campaign 972 =

- Part of Laotian Civil War, Vietnam War
Date	28 October 1972 – 22 February 1973
Location	Southern Laos
Result	Decisive North Vietnamese victory. Kingdom of Laos essentially broken in two. Ceasefire takes effect on 22 February 1973, officially ending the Laotian Civil War. Paksong captured shortly after the ceasefire.
Territorial changes	North Vietnam captures Khong Sedone, Salavan, Thakhek, and Lao Ngam

Belligerents
North Vietnam (Laos) Pathet Lao	Kingdom of Laos; Supported by: United States

Units involved
(North Vietnam) Two provincial battalions (North Vietnam) 4th Battalion of the 270th Regiment (North Vietnam) PT-76 tanks (Laos) Three companies	(Kingdom of Laos) 21st Brigade (Kingdom of Laos) Infantry Battalion 233 (Kingdom of Laos) 2 SPECOM teams (Kingdom of Laos) Mobile Group 34 (Kingdom of Laos) Bataillon Guerrier 308 (Kingdom of Laos) Bataillon Guerrier 311 (Kingdom of Laos) Mobile Group 31 (United States) 1 AC-130 (United States) B-52 Stratofortresses

Campaign 972 (28 October 1972 – 22 February 1973) was the final offensive in the south of the Kingdom of Laos by the People's Army of Vietnam (PAVN). After fending off a score of Royal Lao Government attacks against the Ho Chi Minh Trail between June 1969 and late 1972, the PAVN attacked and essentially cut Laos in two at Khong Sedone by November 1972. Sporadic ongoing fighting, especially for control of Paksong, continued until 8 February 1973. Although a ceasefire officially ended the Laotian Civil War at noon on 23 February with Salavan, Thakhek, and Lao Ngam in Communist hands, the PAVN launched another successful assault on Paksong 15 minutes later.

== Overview ==
The Ho Chi Minh Trail was central to the PAVN strategy for the conquest of South Vietnam during the Second Indochina War. Over the course of the Laotian Civil War, the Central Intelligence Agency directed a series of offensive attacks by Laotian irregulars against the Trail, which the Communists opposed. Operation Lam Son 719 was a larger and more forceful failed attempt at interdiction of the Trail by the South Vietnamese military in February 1971.

In 1972, the PAVN took the offensive.

== Background ==
Planning for Campaign 972 began as early as February 1972. The Communist leaders in Hanoi ordered increased assistance to the Pathet Lao stationed near the Ho Chi Minh Trail. The PAVN Military Region 4 in Vinh was charged with planning an offensive to increase the Pathet Lao holdings in Khammouane and Borikhane Provinces of Laos. Each of the Lao provinces would be invaded by a PAVN provincial battalion. The 4th Battalion of the PAVN 270th Regiment was assigned as additional force. The operation was named Campaign 972 because it would take place in the ninth month of 1972.

== Campaign 972 ==
On 25 September 1972, the Pathet Lao political commissar for Borikhane Province arrested his PAVN adviser before deserting to the Royalists. He took over 300 troops of the Pathet Lao 24th Battalion with him. There was a month's delay while PAVN and loyalist Pathet Lao pursued the dissidents, then regrouped for the assault.

On 28 October, the two PAVN columns launched their attacks. In the wake of the defections, the PL contributed just three companies to the offensive. The Royal Lao Army (RLA) struggled to resist, fielding the 21st Brigade from Thakhek. Bataillon Infanterie 233 (BI 233) and two SPECOM teams were rushed north from Savannakhet to aid in the resistance. Despite their efforts, the PAVN probes neared the Mekong River, essentially cutting Laos in two while threatening the Kingdom of Thailand. One of the Communist columns threatened Thakhek. The other neared the Mekong in the vicinity of the Nam Kading tributary and Pakxan.

On 17 November, two Royalist irregular battalions from Groupement Mobile 34 (GM 34), Bataillon Guerrier 308 (BG 308) and Bataillon Guerrier 311 (BG 311), were airlifted north to Thakhek. They moved southeast along Route 13 on the Mekong riverbank until they ran into the PAVN 42nd Provincial Battalion. The engagement would last until 5 December, when the PAVN broke contact. They then attacked back eastward 20 kilometers, inundating RLA forces on Route 12. BG 311 moved to halt the PAVN thrust 11 kilometers east of Thakhek. When GM 308 showed up, they forced the PAVN troops back another 10 kilometers.

Having quieted that sector, the two irregular battalions returned to Route 13. However, on 22 December, the PAVN again struck. Their infantry now backed up by PT-76 tanks, they ejected a RLA garrison from a Route 13 bridge 40 kilometers south of Thakhek. On the 27th, the GM 34 battalions moved down Route 13 to attack the Communists. The next day, the retreating Vietnamese brought down a highway bridge behind them.

On 5 January 1973, the GM 34 irregulars began an anticlockwise sweep back towards Thakhek, searching for any stray Vietnamese units. After some skirmishes, the irregular force dispersed, to rendezvous in Thakhek for further deployment. However, during January, the Royalist held positions at Thateng, Salavan, and Lao Ngam fell to the Communists.

By 6 February, Groupement Mobile 31 (GM 31) with its 1,444 soldiers had returned from duty in Operation Maharat II. They joined the GM 34 battalions in defending Thakhek for the next couple of weeks until the ceasefire ended the war.

On 8 February, six PAVN tanks backed by infantry assaulted Paksong. When the AC-130 gunship flying support had difficulty getting clearance to strike the Vietnamese, the Communists overran the town. U.S. Air Force General John W. Vogt, Jr. laid on an air campaign to recapture Paksong. He directed 76 preliminary B-52 Stratofortress strikes in the area. Tactical air support for the Royalist counter-attackers amounted to 254 sorties expended. On 12 February, the Royalists retook Paksong.

== Aftermath ==
The ceasefire ending the war came into effect at noon 22 February 1973. U.S. air power was grounded at that time. Fifteen minutes into the truce, a Communist offensive began to retake Paksong from the Royalists. On 23 February 1973, nine B-52s dropped a retaliatory strike on the Communists. These were the last American combat sorties of the war in southern Laos.
