= Operation Bedrock (Laos) =

Military operation

- Part of Laotian Civil War; Vietnam War
| Date | 1–9 November 1971 |
| Location | Southwest of Salavan, Laos |
| Result | Rice supplies to the Ho Chi Minh Trail disrupted |
| Territorial changes | Royal Lao Armed Forces occupy rice fields southwest of Salavan |

Belligerents
| Kingdom of Laos; Supported by CIA of the United States | North Vietnam; Supported by: Soviet Union; People's Republic of China |

Units involved
| Groupement Mobile 41 | 46th Battalion |

Operation Bedrock (Laos) (1–9 November 1971) was a military offensive staged by the Royal Lao Armed Forces against the People's Army of Vietnam in Military Region 4 of the Kingdom of Laos. Its purpose was disruption of the supply of rice to Communist forces occupying the Ho Chi Minh Trail. It was successful.

== Overview ==
From the start of the Vietnam War, the Ho Chi Minh Trail became crucial to the People's Army of Vietnam strategy as its key to conquering South Vietnam. Over the war years, the Trail expanded to 6,400 kilometres (4,000 miles) of road, trail, and waterway. Tchepone in the panhandle of the Kingdom of Laos became a key transshipment and logistics center for the communists. Its significance can be measured by the fact that after many attempts to cut the Trail from Laos, the multi-divisional Operation Lam Son 719 was launched on 8 February 1971 from South Vietnam to capture Tchepone.

From 28 July through 31 October 1971, Royalist forces of the Kingdom of Laos had staged Operation Sayasila in Military Region 4 (MR 4). They managed to wrest control of Route 23 and the towns of Salavan and Paksong and their associated airstrips from the People's Army of Vietnam (PAVN).

== Background ==
When the Khmer Republic withdrew its Project Copper forces from MR 4, it vacated a training base at the PS-18 airstrip. The local Central Intelligence Agency (CIA) unit trained its Bataillons Guerrieres (BGs) there for forays against the Trail. By Autumn 1971, they had formed the first guerrilla regiment, Groupement Mobile 41 (GM 41) from BGs 402, 403, 407, and 408. The CIA case officer who had trained the local Commando Raiders was transferred to advisory duty with GM 41. With a highly respected Royalist Lieutenant Colonel in command, GM 41 was operational as Operation Sayasila ended.

== Operation Bedrock ==
Operation Bedrock's objective was the removal of the 46th Battalion of the People's Army of Vietnam from the rice paddies southwest of Salavan, thus depriving the Communist foe of food. On 1 November 1971, GM 41 was helilifted to Salavan. The guerrilla regiment stepped off and moved 17 kilometers southwest of Route 16/23. On either 2 November or the next morning, the Royalist guerrillas seized the crucial triple road junction of Routes 16, 23, and 231, 21 kilometers southwest of Salavan. One battalion with a heavy weapons company set up a defensive position atop Phou Kong Noy, overlooking the triple junction.

Scattered contacts with Communist troops occurred over 3 and 4 November. The guerrillas depended on their air superiority and called in close air support strikes in these instances; they also utilized heavy weapons fire. The Royalists continued their sweep back toward their point of departure. On 5 November, the Royalists occupied Ban Naxain Noy, some 18 kilometers southwestward of Salavan. A resident stated that the headquarters of the PAVN 46th Battalion had moved out the day before.

There was no contact with Communist forces over the next few days, as the Royalist regiment split into battalions for offensive sweeps. One battalion roved to a point nine kilometers north of the Communist base camp at Thateng. Another occupied the village of Ban Lavang.

No more clashes occurred, as the Bataillon Guerriers regrouped at Salavan to end Operation Bedrock on 9 November 1971.

== Result ==
As a rice denial mission, the movement was also considered a success alongside the secret operation delta. The PAVN 46th Battalion's control of the rice growing plains near Salalvan was broken.

== Aftermath ==
Groupement Mobile 41 was now free for future operations. Operation Thao La was being planned for it.
