= Operation Fa Ngum =

1972 military offensive

- Part of Laotian Civil War; Vietnam War
Date	1–27 April 1972
Location	Laongam, Ban Ngik, and surrounding areas
Result	Partial victory for Royalist forces
Territorial changes	Royalist forces take Laongam, temporarily capture but then abandon Ban Ngik

Belligerents
Kingdom of Laos; Forces Armee Neutralistes; Supported by United States	North Vietnam

Units involved
Group Mobile 32; Group Mobile 41; Ad-hoc Group Mobile; Three FAN battalions	9th Regiment; 39th Regiment

Operation Fa Ngum (1–27 April 1972) was a Laotian military offensive aimed at capturing the villages of Ban Ngik and Laongam as bases for incursions onto the Ho Chi Minh Trail. The Central Intelligence Agency backers of Royalist guerrillas planned to use a combination of air mobility and route march assaults to clear Route 23 through the two towns. Defensive forces to be defeated were the People's Army of Vietnam 9th and 39th Regiments. At various times and in differing combinations, the Royalists would commit two regiments of guerrillas, a makeshift regiment of the Royal Lao Army, three battalions of Neutralists, and a detachment of armored cars. Fighting a two-phase battle, the Royalists displaced the two PAVN regiments back towards the Vietnamese border. The Royalists both gained and gave up the open air cemetery of Ban Ngik. The PAVN returned westward toward the Thai border as the Royalists fell back. Enfeebled by mutiny and a serious casualty rate, the Royalists ended Operation Fa Ngum with a weak defensive blocking position at Laongam on Route 23.

== Overview ==
The Ho Chi Minh Trail was central to the People's Army of Vietnam (PAVN) strategy for the conquest of South Vietnam during the Second Indochina War. When a series of nine CIA-sponsored incursions from Military Region 3 (MR 3) and Military Region 4 (MR 4) of the southern panhandle of the Kingdom of Laos during 1969 and 1970 failed to interdict the Trail, the massive Operation Lam Son 719 was staged on 8 February 1971 to cut it. In the wake of this failure, Central Intelligence Agency (CIA) backed Laotian guerrillas and Royal Lao Government (RLG) military irregulars made further attempts at severing the Communist logistical lines of communication.

== Background ==
Operation Sinsay in early 1972 had followed late 1971's Operation Thao La in attempts to control the strategic Bolovens Plateau that overlooked the Ho Chi Minh Trail; both had maintained tenuous holds on the Plateau. Operation Sinsay ended poorly; the troops that had achieved the momentary success of capturing their objective at Loangam on Route 23 had left the village three days later, at the end of March 1972.

== Phase one ==
On 1 April 1972, the regimental-sized Groupement Mobile 32 (GM 32) was helilifted over the opposing People's Army of Vietnam's 9th Regiment to land in its rear. GM 32's objective was a landing zone near the disputed village of Ban Ngik; the RLG had had one of its regiments, Groupement Mobile 42 (GM 42), overrun there in January. However, GM 32's seizure of Ban Ngik would cut the 9th Regiment's supply line, which led eastwards along Route 23 into the Trail.

Landing south of Ban Ngik with no resistance, GM moved southwest towards the purported 9th Regimental headquarters. It penetrated five kilometers into a Communist supply depot hidden in deep foliage and laced with foot trails and communications wiring. They also met increasing PAVN opposition from both infantry and from artillery fire. PAVN anti-aircraft guns lurking under the heavy cover fended off close air support for the Royalists.

GM 32 completed its sweep in a week, taking severe casualties as it did so. However, they had forced the 9th Regiment into retreat. The PAVN unit managed to circle back past GM 32, to regroup 15 kilometers east of Laongam.

== Phase two ==
The CIA's Pakxe Unit decided to press on with a second stage to the offensive. With GM 32 bolstered by some Cadillac Gage Commando armored cars, an improvised task force moved east against Ban Ngik. GM 32 pushed its way against middling opposition, slowing as it approached the village. GM 41 caught up with them. Also trailing along was an ad hoc Royal Lao Army Groupement Mobile.

The other prong of this assault was three Forces Armées Neutralistes battalions. They moved on Laongam, then advanced northwards on Route 231.

GM 32 took Ban Ngik, only to discover over 100 unburied corpses from the GM 42 massacre in January. Already worn by three weeks of combat, the soldiers of GM 32 were sickened and repulsed by the find. They retreated back down the road towards Laongam, as did the rest of the task force. GM 41 laid a rear guard ambush that killed 14 PAVN troopers. However, the PAVN artillery dropped over 1,000 shells on GM 41, which suffered 125 casualties.

CIA case officer Jim Lewis (call sign Sword) took charge of the defense of Laongam. He ordered GM 32 to man a defensive line there. On 24 January, two battalions of GM 32 deserted westwards towards Thailand. They were talked back to their positions; however, GM 32 still seethed on the verge of mutiny. On 27 April 1972, the operation ended when GM 32 was withdrawn back to Pakxe before they could rebel again, leaving the remainder of the task force to man a feeble blocking position.

== Result ==
The Royalist forces were in worse position at the end of Operation Fa Ngum than they had been after previous RLG offensives. The PAVN 9th Regiment had rebounded after GM 32's departure, and retaken Laongam as the rainy season shut down military movement.

== Aftermath ==
The Royal Lao Government would attempt another offensive at the beginning of the dry season in June 1972.
