= Commando Raiders =

Commando Raiders Commando Raider Teams
- Active: 1968 – 1973
- Country: Kingdom of Laos
- Allegiance: Central Intelligence Agency (CIA), Royal Lao Government
- Type: Commando
- Size: 200 men (at height)
- Part of: Royal Lao Armed Forces
- Headquarters: Ban Pha Khao, northeast of Vientiane "Whiskey-3" Camp, near Savannakhet; PS 22 Camp, near Pakse
- Nicknames: Raiders, CRTs
- Engagements: Laotian Civil War; Operation Counterpunch; Operation Golden Mountain; Operation Phou Phiang II; Operation Maharat; Operation Thao La; Operation Sayasila; Operation Black Lion III

Commanders
- Notable commanders: Vang Pao

The Commando Raiders or Commando Raider Teams (CRTs) were a Laotian paramilitary commando unit, which operated closely with the U.S. Central Intelligence Agency (CIA) during the final phase of the Laotian Civil War, from 1968 to 1973.

== Origins ==
In late 1968, the Savannakhet Unit of the CIA decided to raise a special irregular commando raider unit for specialised crash site recovery along the Ho Chi Minh Trail in south-eastern Laos. Taking especial care to select educated and physically fit young Laotian candidates, two separate groups or "classes" of 40 men each were raised during early 1969. There was a class from Military Region 2 of northern Laos and another from southern Laos; in Autumn 1969, another class of 60 volunteers from Savannakhet was enrolled into the Commando Raiders program.

In March 1969, a U.S. Special Forces (USSF) 17-man team was sent to Phitscamp, Thailand, in order to set up a training camp there for the Commando Raiders' course. Some of the USSF team's members had prior experience in unconventional warfare as participants in the earlier Operation Pincushion or with the Military Assistance Command, Vietnam – Studies and Observations Group (MACV-SOG); the latter organization devised the three-month curriculum for the training program to be held at Phitscamp. The two early classes were trained separately from one another for two main reasons: one was the animosity between the classes, which had different ethnical backgrounds; the other was that the American trainers did not want the trainees to discover that the pay rates differed between the two classes, with the southerners receiving higher wages.

Upon arriving to Phitscamp, the trainees were divided into eight-man teams, with a USSF adviser being assigned to each team. As part of their training programme, they were familiarized with both friendly and enemy weaponry and equipment they would use on their missions. Besides attending weapons handling and commando courses, the teams were also given parachute training just before their graduation in August 1969. After completing the Commando Raider course, they were then sent to their operational base in Laos, an isolated CIA camp located northeast of Savannakhet dubbed "Whiskey-3".

== Structure and organization ==
By 1972, the Commando Raiders strength peaked at about 200 officers and enlisted men, all airborne-qualified volunteers, organized into three independent para-commando companies, comprising three headquarters (HQ) sections and each broken into 12-men teams:

- The 1st Commando Raider Company (Airborne), based at Ban Pha Khao, northeast of Vientiane in Military Region 2 (MR 2), was tasked of operations in north-eastern Laos.
- The 2nd Commando Raider Company (Airborne), based at "Whiskey-3" Camp, near Savannakhet in Military Region 3 (MR 3), covered the upper Laotian panhandle.
- The 3rd Commando Raider Company (Airborne), initially based at PS 22 Camp, near Pakse (later relocated to a new camp located 26 kilometers north of that city) in Military Region 4 (MR 4), handled operations in south-eastern Laos.

== Operational history 1968-1973 ==
The Commando Raiders were initially employed primarily on bomb damage assessment, cross border reconnaissance forays, hazardous ambushes and raids, pathfinder insertions, prisoner of war acquisition for interrogation, and tracking targets, though they were deployed in other military regions to demonstrate symbolic support from the Royal Lao Government. As the war progressed, the Commando Raiders shifted from their original special operations role to become Airborne Pathfinders instead.

=== MR 1 operations ===
Recruitment of local Commando Raiders began in January 1970 and after a hasty training stint in Thailand, the Raiders were returned to Military Region 1 (MR 1) in June that year. They were deployed as road watchers along the Route 46 portion of the Chinese Road, using the Hark-1 to gather military intelligence.

=== MR 2 operations ===
In late 1969, the northern class comprising 40 Commando Raiders was deployed to the Ban Pha Khao staging base, accompanied by an experienced CIA case officer. On 26 November 1970, the Raiders played a key role in Operation Counterpunch, when they seized the airstrip at San Tiau. An additional company of Raiders was raised in January 1970. On February 22, 32 Commando Raiders were committed to a raid over the border towards Điện Biên Phủ in North Vietnam. Dropped by Air America helicopters to the west of their target but still within Laos, the Raiders slipped across the border and staged a rocket attack on an officers' meeting at a North Vietnamese Army (NVA) headquarters. The Commandos then exfiltrated to be picked up by Air America Helicopters on February 24.

In March 1970, a contingent of 60 Raiders were sent to Military Region 4. Assigned primarily to defensive duties, they seemed to serve mostly as a symbol of MR 2's willingness to send its best units to MR 4's aid. This contingent returned to MR 2 to find itself engaged in the battle to retake Sam Thong, losing their own commander in the course of action.

On 23 May 1970, 21 Raiders dressed in NVA uniforms staged a cross border raid on a supply center at Moung Sen. By May 29, NVA patrols brought the Raiders to bay and they dispersed into the jungle, only to be hunted down almost to a man. Only four half-starved Raiders managed to escape, being subsequently rescued by an Air America helicopter. There were staged further three raids on Moung Sen, the last one in October 1971. The Commando Raiders would also be used as Pathfinders over the next couple of years, in various actions such as Operation Golden Mountain, Operation Phou Phiang II, Operation Maharat, and in some other occasions.

=== MR 3 operations ===
In early 1970, the Commando Raiders carried out their first reconnaissance and raiding operation into North Vietnam under the codename "Chicken Fight". Heli-lifted by Air America to the Laotian/Vietnamese border area, a 30-man team infiltrated 14 kilometers across the border northeast of the Nape Pass to raid a NVA training camp at Rao Qua. Using the five 60mm mortars they brought with them, the team fired some 50 rounds at 05:00 hours into the sleeping camp. Leaving behind the enemy installations in flames, the team retreated back into Laos for exfiltration.

This success led to a second mission in early April that same year. The Commando Raiders were sent to disable an anti-aircraft site near the strategic Mụ Giạ Pass crossing of the Ho Chi Minh Trail. Their backup target was a North Vietnamese Petrol, Oil and Lubricants (POL) line. Although this raid was unsuccessful, they followed up with two later nondescript forays along the Trail.

At this stage, the teams were being manned according to the planned missions' objectives from their base at "Whiskey-3". Some 120 to 200 Commandos were available for duty at a given moment, and their missions were usually shallow incursions from Military Region 3 into North Vietnam. These were generally indirect fire operations with improvised rocket launchers, supported by an idling helicopter waiting to whisk the Commandos away afterwards. Developed for the Commando Raiders in 1969, the two-shot 2.75 inch rocket launcher was modified from the rocket pod used on O-1F Bird Dog spotter aircraft. High explosive heads were fitted, and a simple tripod attached to the launching tubes. Several versions of the rocket launcher were made, including a six-shot wheeled type. A single-shot 5-inch high-velocity aircraft rocket launcher was also used. Rocket missions were successful in harassing the NVA in what they had considered "safe" territory, but there was no feedback concerning enemy casualties or the damage inflicted. However, an unsuccessful raid on Lang Mo on 21 October 1970 brought an end to this practice.

From December 1970 through January 1971, the Raiders underwent retraining courses. After a few minor actions, in April 1971, 24 Raiders disguised in NVA garb provided with three 81mm mortars, were inserted north of Mu Gia to attack a NVA rest area. The Raiders' landing zone had been used previously by the MR 4 Raiders, but now it was occupied by North Vietnamese troops. The incoming Raiders were caught under fire as soon as they touched down and their CIA adviser lost all radio contact with them. Five weeks later, the first of a small group of only five survivors made it back to friendly territory.

Later on November 20, the Commando Raiders secured a landing zone north of Ban Phone at the start of Operation Thao La. However, in December 1971, the CIA Savannakhet Unit shut down its Commando Raider program; the reason cited was that the results delivered by the program were not worth the investment made.

=== MR 4 operations ===
In July 1970, a contingent of 30 Commando Raiders was sent to Khong Island in Military Region 4. From there, a 12-man team executed one of their raids across the border with mortar fire on a NVA unit in northeastern Cambodia. The Raiders also laid ambushes along the Communist supply line down the Se Kong River. The Pakse Unit of the CIA was so impressed with the Commando Raiders performance that they decided in late September that year to raise and train their own 50-man Raiders force. Based at Pakse Site 22 Camp (PS 22) on the eastern rim of the Bolovens Plateau, the newly raised Raiders teams were employed on special operations in Communist-occupied Attopeu Province. However, by November 1970, North Vietnamese advances had forced them to relocate to a new staging base located 26 kilometers north of Pakse.

On 27 July 1971, the Commando Raiders were employed in the pathfinder role during Operation Sayasila, successfully securing the airfield located near the town of Salavan, capital of the namesake province, in just 12 minutes without facing any significant opposition. Late that year, the MR 4 Commando Raiders were used in a more conventional role as light infantry in clearing operations along Route 23, which led their American adviser to resign in protest for their misuse. On 18 October 1972, a Raider team was parachuted on a pathfinder mission during the opening stages of Operation Black Lion III.

== Disbandment ==
On 21 February 1973, the long-awaited protocols to the Agreement on the Restoration of Peace and Reconciliation in Laos were signed in Vientiane, opening the way for the Royal Lao Government and the Pathet Lao leadership to iron out the final mechanics of a coalition government. As stipulated by the terms of this agreement, all the irregular ethnic Commando units and SGU guerilla forces were scheduled for integration into the Royal Lao Army (RLA), the official military of the Kingdom of Laos. The CIA subsequently disbanded its Commando Raider Companies, with most of their members being reassigned to the irregular Special Guerrilla Units (SGUs) recondo companies attached to each of their Mobile Groups (French: Groupements Mobiles – GMs), serving as Airborne Pathfinders. Some 140 former para-commandos from the Savannakhet-based Raider company were transferred to the RLA in mid-1973 to form the third company of its newly created special forces unit, SPECOM.

== Weapons and equipment ==
The commando raider units used the standard weaponry and equipment of U.S. origin issued to FAR units, complemented by captured Soviet or Chinese small-arms that allowed its personnel to use ammunition retrieved from enemy stocks while on operations. They also fielded crew-served heavy weapons, such as one-shot, two-shot or six-shot rocket launchers and mortars.

- United States Colt.45 M1911A1 Pistol
- United States Smith & Wesson Model 39 Pistol
- Sweden Carl Gustaf m/45 Submachine gun
- China Type 56 assault rifle
- China Type 56-1 Assault rifle
- Soviet Union AKM Assault rifle
- United States M16A1 Assault rifle
- United States CAR-15 Assault carbine
- United States M1918A2 BAR Light machine gun
- Soviet Union RPD Light machine gun
- China Type 56 LMG Light machine gun
- United States Browning M1919A6 .30 Cal light machine gun
- United States Browning M1919A4 .30 Cal Medium machine gun
- United States Browning M2HB .50 Cal Heavy machine gun
- United States M72 LAW Anti-tank rocket launcher
- United States M79 grenade launcher
- United States M203 grenade launcher
- United States 2.75 inch rocket launcher
- United States 5-inch high-velocity aircraft rocket launcher
- United States M19 60mm Mortar
- United States M29 81mm Mortar
- United States M18 Claymore anti-personnel mines

== Uniforms and insignia ==
Commando Raider Teams wore distinctive dark blue fatigues with a black or blue beret, the latter worn French-style, pulled to the left. Raiders operating out of north-eastern Laos occasionally wore North Vietnamese uniforms, whilst the Savannakhet CR teams sometimes used Pathet Lao uniforms when operating along the Ho Chi Minh Trail.

== See also ==
- Air America (airline)
- Directorate of National Coordination
- Laotian Civil War
- Lao People's Armed Forces
- List of weapons of the Laotian Civil War
- Military Region 5 Commandos
- Pathet Lao
- Project Unity (Laos)
- Royal Lao Armed Forces
- Royal Lao Army Airborne
- Special Guerrilla Units (SGU)
- SPECOM
- Vietnam War
