= Houayhe =

- Village
- Location in Laos
- Coordinates: 15°9′47″N 105°58′11″E
- Country: Laos
- Province: Champasak Province
- District: Pak Sé District

Alak blacksmiths in Houayhe

Houayhe is a village in Pak Sé District, Champasak Province, in southern Laos. It is located to the east by road of the Pakxe and Houaysae along Route 16E. Route 20 starts at Houayhe from Route 16E and leads northeast to Laongam and eventually to Salavan.
