= Houaysae =

- Village
- Location in Laos
- Coordinates: 15°7′10″N 105°52′54″E
- Country: Laos
- Province: Champasak Province
- District: Pak Sé District

Houaysae is a village in Pak Sé District, Champasak Province, in southern Laos. It is located to the east by road of the Pakxe. Further east is Houayhe.
