= Operation Thao La =

- Part of Laotian Civil War; Vietnam War
Date	21 November – 16 December 1971
Location	Southern Laos
Result	See Aftermath section below
Territorial changes	Royalists take Tha Theng and Ban Phong, lose Salavan

Belligerents
Kingdom of Laos; Supported by: United States	North Vietnam; Supported by: Soviet Union; People's Republic of China

Units involved
Bataillon Infanterie 9 Bataillon Volontaire 46; Bataillon Volontaire 48; Bataillon Volontaire 41; Commando Raiders; Groupement Mobile 33; Groupement Mobile 41; Royal Lao Air Force; Raven Forward Air Controllers U.S. Air Force	9th PAVN Regiment; Five PAVN battalions

Casualties and losses
399 killed 1,376 wounded 343 missing	1,204 killed 763 wounded

Operation Thao La (21 November–16 December 1971) was a Royal Lao Government (RLG) dry season offensive during the Laotian Civil War, aimed at severing the Ho Chi Minh Trail and retrieving the Lao Bolaven Plateau from the grip of the People's Army of Vietnam. Its objectives were the use of recently captured Salavan as a jumpoff point for occupying Tha Theng and Ban Phong. Key to the plan was a prearranged daily allotment of supportive tactical air power.

In the event, the Royalists captured their two objectives. However, they lost both Salavan and Paksong to the North Vietnamese; they also failed to find the Communist transshipment point whose conquest would have interdicted the Trail.

== Overview ==
The Ho Chi Minh Trail was central to the People's Army of Vietnam (PAVN) strategy for the conquest of South Vietnam during the Second Indochina War. When a series of nine CIA-sponsored incursions from Military Region 3 (MR 3) and Military Region 4 (MR 4) of the southern panhandle of the Kingdom of Laos during 1969 and 1970 failed to interdict the Trail, the massive Operation Lam Son 719 was staged on 8 February 1971 to cut it. In the wake of this failure, CIA backed Laotian guerrillas and Royal Lao Government military irregulars made further attempts at severing the logistical lines of communication.

A string of Communist transshipment points, called Binh Trams, stretched the length of the Trail. Each garrisoned by approximately a PAVN regiment, and was responsible for construction and maintenance of an assigned Trail segment. A Binh Tram typically consisted of motor transport battalions, combat engineer battalions, antiaircraft units, as well as medical personnel, infantry units for security, and a communications section.

== Background ==
In mid-May 1971, Operation Phoutah failed to secure the forward airfield at Moung Phalane as a starting point for Royalist attacks against the Trail. The three-day blood bath of Operation Phiboonpol from 9–11 June 1971 was indecisive. From 28 July through 31 October 1971, Operation Sayasila managed to wrest control of Route 23 and the towns of Salavan and Paksong and their associated airstrips from the (PAVN), but failed to conquer the entire Bolaven Plateau. Also, from 1–9 November, Operation Bedrock weakened the PAVN troops on the Trail by denying them rice. It also left Groupement Mobile 41 (GM 41) field tested and ready for further operations.

== Operation Thao La ==
Operation Thao La was planned to take advantage of improved flying weather during the nascent dry season in Laos. Its objective was Binh Tram 37, 30 kilometers east of Communist-held Thateng, Laos. U.S. Air Force (USAF) tactical air power was arranged, with 18 daily sorties allotted for the first two days, then 24 sorties daily for a fortnight. The dark hours would be covered by two gunship sorties per night. If Thao La was successful in smashing Binh Tram 37, it would both restrict supplies to Communist forces in South Vietnam and starve the Communists off the Bolaven Plateau. Like the preceding Operation Sayasila, Operation Thao La was aimed at regaining control of the Plateau for the Royal Lao Government (RLG). The towns of Thateng and Ban Phone were to be captured from the PAVN in a three column multi-battalion offensive. As a preliminary move, the gains of Operation Sayasila needed to be protected. On 8 November, Bataillon Infanterie 9 (BI 9) joined Bataillon Volontaire 46 (BV 46) and Bataillon Volontaire 48 (BV 48) in garrisoning Paksong. Four battalions from MR 3 returned to their base at Savannakhet.

Because of the American restrictions on Lao military planning, approval by the U.S. Joint Chiefs of Staff did not come through until 15 November. On 16 November, just prior to Thao La's scheduled start, a purported four battalion force of PAVN were reported by Royalist guerrillas, 19 kilometers northwest of Salavan. Tactical air strikes on the concentration resulted in about 70 enemy troops killed.

On 20 November 1971, the operation was preceded by ten sorties of defensive land mines air-dropped by the U.S. Air Force. Commando Raiders occupied a helicopter landing zone (HLZ) north of Ban Phone. On 21 November, USAF F-4 Phantom IIs struck the HLZ, and the 1,150 Royalist guerrillas of the Groupement Mobile 33 (GM 33) regiment was lifted in unopposed from Salavan. By 1100 hours, it had secured the area with only minor opposition, and all four of its battalions encamped within two kilometers of the village.

Also on 21 November, three battalions of GM 41 swept south through the rice paddies outside of Salavan. With no appreciable resistance offered by the PAVN, the GM 41 column made it to Ban Nongnok, where they overran the 49th PAVN Field Hospital on the 23rd. At this time, USAF tactical air blasted an HLZ atop Phou Thioum. Although about 50 PAVN troops tried to defend the hilltop, USAF A-1 Skyraider strikes quelled them. After capturing the position, the fourth Royalist battalion of GM 41 established a fire base with a 75mm pack howitzer, three 75mm recoilless rifles, and three 81mm mortars. The Royalists could now drop artillery shells anywhere in the vicinity of Ban Nongnok.

By 25 November, all Royalist objectives had been secured except Tha Theng proper. The following day saw the Royalist reserve of two guerrilla battalions moved north from Lima Site 449 (LS 449) to reinforce the move into Tha Theng; by afternoon, the three year occupation by the Communists had been ended.

On 28 November, GM 33 began clearing Route 16 and its surrounding valley as it handed westward to link up with the Royalist troops in Tha Theng. It covered half the distance in the next two days, while meeting ever-increasing Communist resistance. On 1 December, it captured four trucks. Stretching into battalion line, the irregular regiment swept for PAVN rice caches and supply depots to deprive the Communists of materiel. Westward moving partisans began to struggle with trees downed to block Route 16. In the meantime, PAVN began a series of squad-sized attacks on Tha Theng. Meanwhile, at Paksong, the 9th PAVN Regiment had probed the Royalist defenses 21 times during November.

On 3 December at Tha Theng, a PAVN battalion attacked an irregular battalion. Meanwhile, intelligence reports made it clear that PAVN forces were coalescing near the former Communist transshipment point. As a counter, the USAF honored an emergency request and dropped aerial denial ordnance along two projected approach lanes to Tha Theng. The USAF also consented to extending the supply of 24 sorties of daily tactical air power for Thao La through 27 December 1971.

At 2200 hours 5 December, PAVN intruders began probing the Royalist positions at Salavan. Night long close air support by a Royal Lao Air Force (RLAF) AC-47 gunship helped the Royalist Bataillon Volontaires 41 (BV 41) hold until near dawn. At 0500 hours, a PAVN force of at least three battalions struck Salavan. Raven Forward Air Controllers directed 60 sorties of tactical air strikes upon them throughout the morning and early afternoon. However, at 1430 hours, the Royalist commander called retreat; the monarchist regulars scattered west and north, leaving Salavan to the Communists, and further isolating the Royalist irregular troops at Tha Theng and Ban Phong.

Even as Thao La unfolded, the PAVN continued their own offensive operations. By the end of the first week in December, Raven FACs noticed freshly built PAVN bunkers within 50 meters of Paksong's defenses. A skirmish on 8 December resulted in two Royalist killed and ten claimed PAVN dead. Air strikes called by the Royalists are estimated to have killed 20 more PAVN soldiers.

At 2000 hours on 9 December, four tanks and two PAVN infantry battalions struck GM 41 at Tha Theng. Striking from the north, they split in half to form two attacking columns. One of the tanks penetrated the Tha Theng perimeter, locked one tread, and spun on the other while firing in all directions, dispersing two of the Royalist guerrilla battalions. The two remaining RLG battalions clung to Tha Theng until reinforced. At 0430 on the 10th, the PAVN armor retreated. The Royalists had suffered 20 killed and 23 wounded, in return for unknown enemy losses. Raven FACs directed close air support sorties on the Communists for the remainder of the day. It also requested mining sorties along Route 23, to block or destroy PAVN tanks inbound to Salavan.

Meanwhile, the PAVN still were trying to take Paksong. Between 10 and 12 December, there were several engagements, ranging from skirmishes between small units up to company engagements of several hours. At its fiercest, the battle escalated to use of B-40 rockets, DK-82 recoilless rifles, and 60mm mortars by the PAVN. In return, the Royalists called in RLAF T-28 Trojan strikes, AC-47 gunship fire missions, and artillery fire. On 13 December, the outpost of irregulars on Phou Nongkin relocated to the two peaks of Phou Thevada lying three kilometers east of Paksong. On 14 December, four battalions of Royalist guerrillas ambushed the PAVN as they gathered north of the town. Two days later, the same guerrilla force was hit by both 60mm and 82mm mortar fire backed by a ground assault from three sides. The guerrillas scattered in retreat.

Presented with the dilemma of which objective was most valuable to their cause, the RLG opted on attempting to retake Salavan while holding Tha Theng. GM 33 was approaching Tha Theng from the east as it moved along Route 16. Leaving a small partisan garrison at Tha Theng, the RLG elected to move its four irregular battalions north for a surprise counterattack on Salavan. Beginning 8 December, troops that had withdrawn from Salavan began to rendezvous 32 kilometers west of town. They were mustered, re-equipped, and resupplied to attack northwards towards Salavan on 15 December. A USAF mission dropped both defensive area denial munitions and land mines under direction of Raven FACs. On 16 December, the four irregular battalions left Tha Theng to assault Salavan. Operation Thao La was officially ended.

== Aftermath ==
The official end of Operation Thao La did not terminate Royalist military action. The recouped guerrillas from Tha Theng had closed to seven kilometers south-southeast of Salavan on 20 December. Two regular Royalist units, Bataillon Volontaires 41 (BV 41) and Bataillon Volontaires 46 (BV 46), were ordered into a flanking attack from the west, although they never budged. The Tha Theng irregulars directed tactical air strikes on the PAVN on 22 and 23 December despite poor flying weather; they followed up with a ground assault. An estimated 250 PAVN were killed in this action, but Salavan remained in Communist hands. The MR 4 command then decided that Salavan could not be held by the RLG even if recaptured. On 24 December, the four battalions of irregulars from Tha Theng joined BV 41 and BV 46 in a retreat from Salavan.

Nor did the PAVN action end coincide with Operation Thao La's finish. Even as a purported 1,000 PAVN troops bombarded forward positions at Paksong with mortar fire, making them difficult to reinforce and resupply, they also angled to cut Route 23 to entrap the Royalists. There was little retaliatory air power available; most tactical air power was being used against Salavan or on the Plain of Jars. On the evening of 18 December, headlights were spotted outside Paksong. On the 19th, tank tread marks were spotted 14 kilometers north of town; at least three tanks were suspected. By 24 December, PAVN troops were spotted on Route 23 between Paksong and the Royalist home base of Pakse. During the next two days, a number of PAVN heavy machine guns moved in on Paksong, complicating Royalist-backed aerial traffic. The bombardment of the town's northern defenses increased.

On 27 December 1971, two PAVN battalions closed in on Paksong. The two guerrilla battalions on Phou Thevada withdrew into the town. The guerrillas from north of town rushed in after taking 11 killed. Although the Royalist defenders outnumbered the attacking Vietnamese, they fled westward anyhow down Route 23 toward home. Four howitzers, five trucks, and smaller equipment were abandoned to the victors.

On 28 December, the PAVN entered Paksong and torched it. That evening, a tactical air strike destroyed the abandoned howitzers and trucks.

== Results ==
Operation Thao La gained its two objectives of Tha Theng and Ban Phong by its official end on 16 December. However, it lost its offensive's launching point at Salavan in the process. It also failed to break the PAVN's grip on the eastern Bolavan Plateau where it overwatched the Ho Chi Minh Trail. Although the Royalists had gained their objectives at Tha Theng and Ban Phon, they also lost Salavan and Paksong. The RLG casualty list totaled 2,118—399 killed, 1,376 wounded, and 343 missing. GM 41 was especially hard hit. On the other side, PAVN casualties were deemed to be 653 killed by air, 551 killed in ground combat, and 763 wounded, totaling 1,967 dead or wounded.

Operation Thao La failed to find Binh Tram 37.
