= Phou Khao Kham =

Phou Khai Kham
- Part of Laotian Civil War; Vietnam War
Date	5 August – 21 September 1971
Location	Sala Phou Khoun and Muang Soui in northern Laos
Result	Royalists take Muang Soui, do not take Sala Phou Khoun

Belligerents
Kingdom of Laos; Supported by United States	(Laos) Pathet Lao; Supported by North Vietnam Soviet Union; People's Republic of China

Units involved
Bataillon Commando 206; Bataillon Infanterie 6 Commando Raiders; 21st Special Operations Squadron; Royal Lao Air Force; U.S. Air Force A-1 Skyraiders	At least one battalion

Casualties and losses
Unknown	Unknown

Phou Khao Kham (Gold Mountain), (5 August – 25 September 1971) was a Royal Lao Government military offensive operation of the Laotian Civil War designed to clear Communist forces off Routes 13 and 7 north of the administrative capital of Vientiane. Its end objective was the capture of the forward fighter base at Muang Soui on the Plain of Jars. Although it succeeded in taking the air base, it failed to remove a concentration of Communist troops at the Sala Phou Khoun intersection of Routes 7 and 13.

== Overview ==
The French loss of the First Indochina War led to the establishment of the independent Kingdom of Laos by the 1954 Geneva Agreements. While Laotian neutrality called for a ban on foreign military forces save for a French advisory mission. However, North Vietnamese troops had settled in northeastern Laos to support a Lao communist insurrection. The Laotian Civil War was the result.

== Background ==
Although the administrative capital of Vientiane had suffered through the Battle of Vientiane and several subsequent coups, there had been only one early military operation in Military Region 5—Operation Triangle in July 1964. However, beginning 5 August 1971, there would be another.

== Phou Khao Khouai ==
The new offensive, code named Phou Khao Khouai ("White Buffalo Mountain") began at Moung Kassy on Route 13 on 5 August 1971, on the sole road between Vientiane and Luang Prabang. Two Royalist battalions, Bataillon Commando 206 (BC 206), and Bataillon Infanterie 6 (BI 6) were detailed for the attack, along with a commando company from the Military Region 5 Commandos. Their objective was a highway sweep north on Route 13, leading to capture of the forward fighter base at Muang Soui on the branching Route 7.

Moving north from Moung Kassy on 5 August 1971, the Royalist column crept through the rain for the following fortnight, meeting only sporadic Communist opposition. It came to a halt against the defended Routes 7/13 intersection at Sala Phou Khoun. Unable to force entry into the mouth of Route 7, the Royalist column veered off Route 13 to parallel Route 7 to its south. The flanking movement penetrated 15 kilometers before being balked by a Pathet Lao battalion. Phou Khao Khouai stalled there for about a month, until mid-September.

== Phou Khao Kham ==
The stalled offensive force was removed from the ridge where it had encamped, and leapfrogged over the foe to be landed at a vacant Auto Defense de Choc (ADC) site, Xieng Dat. They were refurbished for three days in preparation of a heliborne assault on Muang Soui; in the process, the operation was renamed Phou Khao Kham (meaning Gold Mountain).

On 24 September 1971, 62 Commando Raiders from Military Region 2 (MR 2) were picked up by two 21st Special Operations Squadron (21st SOS) helicopters. The Raiders were inserted in locations six kilometers both southwest and southeast of Muang Soui. Covered by U.S. A-1 Skyraiders, the Raiders moved from the hills into town. By dark, they had occupied it.

Early 25 September, six copters from the 21st SOS began lifting soldiers from BI 6 onto Muang Soui's runway. They landed under an umbrella of both U.S. and Royal Lao Air Force (RLAF) tactical air power. Both RLAF and Air America helicopters carried in BC 206 and the commando company. By noon, sporadic Communist mortar and light machine gun fire died off as they retreated northwards.

== Result ==
The Royal Lao Government recaptured and held the forward tactical aircraft base at Muang Soui.

== See also ==
Operation Maharat
Operation Maharat II
