= Lao Ngam district =

Lao Ngam district ເມືອງເລົ່າງາມ
- District
- Country: Laos
- Province: Salavan
- Time zone: UTC+7 (ICT)

Lao Ngam is a district (muang) of Salavan province in southern Laos.
