= Lao Ngam, Laos =

Lao Ngam
- Town
- Wat Pa Temple, Lao Ngam, Salavan Province, Laos (January 2026)

- Location in Laos
- Coordinates: 15°27′45″N 106°9′39″E
- Country: Laos
- Province: Salavan Province
- District: Lao Ngam District

Lao Ngam is a small town in Salavan Province, in southern Laos. It is the capital of Lao Ngam District. It is located along Route 20 to the northeast of Houayhe on the way to Salavan.
