= Project Copper =

- Part of Vietnam War (Laos • Cambodia • Vietnam)
- Type: Coordinated military action
- Location: Laotian and Cambodian border
- Planned by: RLAF, FANK, CIA, DOD
- Commanded by: Lim Sisaath, Hatsaty Sinsay, Lon Non
- Objective: Interdict the Sihanouk Trail; train irregular forces
- Date: Late-1970–May 1971
- Executed by: RLAF, FANK, CIA, DOD, ARVN
- Outcome: Interdiction failed, project abandoned

Project Copper
Date	December 1970 – 9 January 1971, February 1971 – June 1971
Location	Laos and Cambodia
Action	Capture strategic positions along the Sihanouk Trail
Result	Forces withdrawn and re-assigned

Belligerents
Kingdom of Laos; Khmer Republic; Supported by United States; South Vietnam	North Vietnam

Commanders and leaders
(Laos) Hatsaty Sinsay (Khmer Republic) Lim Sisaath (Khmer Republic) Lon Non	

Units involved
Three commando battalions 15 Brigade d'Infanterie; Bataillon Chasseur 202	

Casualties and losses
82	Unknown

Project Copper was a coordinated military action undertaken by the Kingdom of Laos and the Khmer Republic from 1 January–May 1971. It used U.S. Department of Defense (DOD) funds channeled through the Central Intelligence Agency to train three Cambodian battalions to interdict the Sihanouk Trail before it joined the Ho Chi Minh Trail. Committed to battle in southern Laos on 1 January 1971, one battalion deserted the battlefield, a second one mutinied during training, and a third had to be repurposed after suffering 80 casualties. By late January, the project was temporarily suspended.

Project Copper was revived in March 1971. Lon Non committed his 15 Brigade Infanterie (15 BI) to the task. One battalion of the brigade occupied two minor outposts. The Cambodian troops were recalled for duty near Phnom Penh, with the last of them being repatriated in June 1971. Thus began and ended military cooperation between the two governments.

== Overview ==
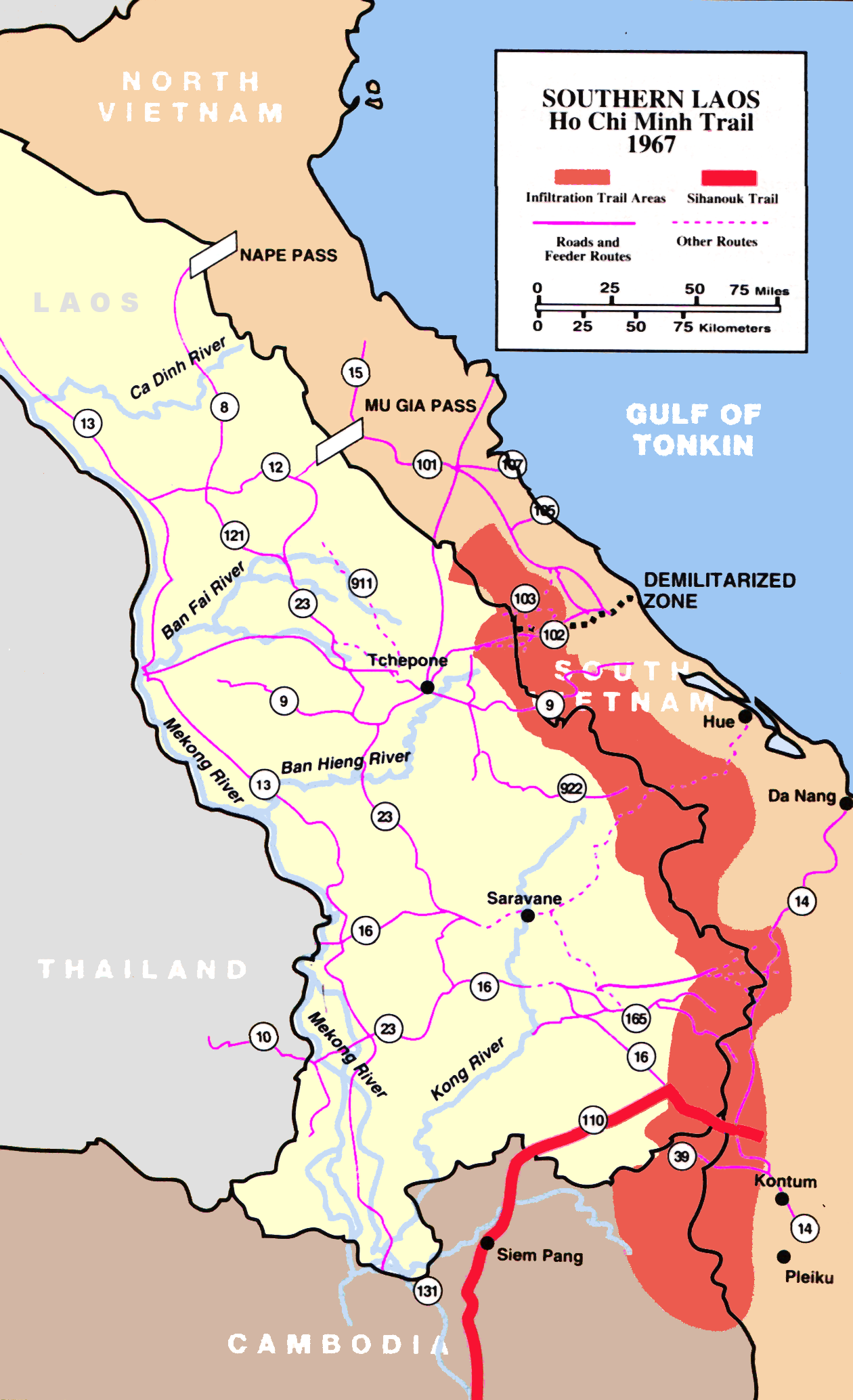
Map of Southern Laos and the Ho Chi Minh Trail network. The Sihanouk Trail portion is limned in dark gold at the bottom of the map.

Located in the southern panhandle of the territory of the Kingdom of Laos, the Ho Chi Minh Trail was the logistics backbone of the communist forces during the Second Indochina War, as it was the main supply route for Viet Cong and People's Army of Vietnam (PAVN) forces fighting in South Vietnam. It was characterized as, "the lifeline of Hanoi's efforts to topple the South Vietnamese Government." At the southern end of the Ho Chi Trail was a dirt road, Route 110, and a surrounding network of logistical trails running into Cambodia that comprised the Sihanouk Trail. The Sihanouk Trail connected the Ho Chi Minh Trail with the deep water ocean port of Sihanoukville, the entry point for thousands of tons of communist war materiel. From December 1966 through April 1969, over 21,000 tons of ordnance entered the Sihanouk Trail from the post of Sihanoukville; it was estimated there were sufficient crew-served weapons to equip 240 battalions, and small arms enough for 585 battalions.

== Background ==
The Sihanouk Trail was activated in 1965, stretching from the Cambodian port of Sihanoukville through Cambodia to the southern end of the Ho Chi Minh Trail. In Military Region 4 (MR 4) of the Kingdom of Laos, the two trails joined. The Royal Lao Government (RLG) commander of MR 4 and the communist interlopers from the Trails shared a truce by gentleman's agreement. The agreement had been breached in 1966 by fleeting Royal Lao Air Force (RLAF) raids against the Sihanouk Trail. MACV-SOG also sent patrols from South Vietnam against both Trails, though with little or limited success in interdiction. The Sihanouk Trail was a product of Norodom Sihanouk's accommodations with the Vietnamese communists. As a counter to this supply effort, the Central Intelligence Agency (CIA) sponsored guerrilla unit raids by hill tribesmen in MR 4; from 21–26 June 1969, they cut the Sihanouk Trail for three days during Operation Left Jab. When Sihanouk fell from power in March 1970, the new republican government of Cambodia clamped down on communist traffic in the nation. In May, a RLG delegation led by Prince Boun Oum offered Lon Nol the opportunity to station Khmer troops in southern Laos and fight the communists there instead of in Cambodia. The RLG offer was originally declined, then rethought.

== Planning and training ==
Project Copper was planned by a combination of paramilitary and military forces. The admixture began with U.S. Department of Defense (DOD) funding for a CIA paramilitary operation. The new CIA Chief of Station had just transferred in from the battlefields of Military Region 2; thus, he was familiar with operational planning. Actual planning and execution of the planned operation depended on a coterie of Cambodian and Lao officers who were personally and professionally acquainted. Colonel Hatsaty Sinsay, the Royal Lao Army (RLA) commander of Military Region 4, had trained in Phnom Penh in 1960. When Cambodian Lieutenant Colonel Lim Sisaath visited the Khong Island headquarters of Sinsay during Summer 1970, the two became friends. Lim had been military academy classmates with Lon Nol's younger brother, Lon Non. In September 1970, Lon Non tasked Lim with recruiting two battalions of trainees from Phnom Penh for training by the CIA. The recruits were transported to Pakse Site 18 to be secretively trained by a couple of CIA case officers and six Khmer veteran sergeants of the South Vietnamese Army.

With DOD funding available, the Khmer trainees were better supplied than the usual run of CIA-trained guerrillas. They were completely armed with M16 rifles, and had bazookas, and both 60mm and 81mm mortars, for heavier weaponry. Most of them completed training by the end of 1970. A few select commando teams continued training.

== Activities ==
In December 1970, one of the Khmer battalions was transported to Pakse Strip 22 (PS 22), while a third battalion entered training. On 1 January 1971, the 470 Khmer soldiers of the first battalion were helilifted 38 kilometers southeast to occupy an abandoned outpost at Pakse Strip 43 (PS 43). On 9 January, they were shuttled 20 kilometers further east, to take Pakse Strip 38 (PS 38) without a fight. By the time the second trained battalion joined them a fortnight later, the Khmer had suffered their first two killed in action during some skirmishes and were having second thoughts about soldiering. The People's Army of Vietnam attacked PS 38 at night soon thereafter, inflicting 80 casualties on the second battalion within 12 hours. By the next day, the Khmer had abandoned their positions and straggled away to Paksong. From there they were helicoptered back to PS 18.

The first battalion then returned to Phnom Penh for a break; they deserted. The second battalion shipped off to Commando Raider training in Thailand. The new third battalion mutinied rather than train, and were discharged. Lim had spent little time with his troops in the field, and had lost control of them; he was transferred out. His second in command was caught smuggling opium into Cambodia, and was canned. Lon Non forwarded three Khmer National Armed Forces (FANK) officers to take charge of Project Copper.

== Restart and end ==
Ratanakiri Province, Cambodia is southeast of Khong Island, Laos. The Sihanouk Trail ran through the province.

Stung Treng Province, Cambodia is located directly downriver from Khong Island, Laos.

Detailed by his brother to restart Project Copper in February 1971, Lon Non used his already trained five-battalion 15 Brigade d'Infanterie. With only three days warning, the Brigade was lifted to the southeastern edge of the Bolovens Plateau. Some 15 commando teams were detailed for training at PS 18. Bataillon Chasseur 202 (BC 202) met little resistance when it occupied PS 38 and PS 43.

In March 1971, the commando teams were inserted into Stung Treng Province and Ratanakiri Province to spy on PAVN supply traffic for a month. Lon Non recalled the Brigade in May for a sweep outside Phnom Penh. This ended Project Copper. The road watch teams were withdrawn to PS 18, then subsequently repatriated in early June 1971.

== Result ==
Project Copper both began and ended any significant military cooperation between the Royal Lao Government and the government of the Khmer Republic.
