= Tha Teng district =

Tha Teng district ເມືອງທ່າແຕງ
- District
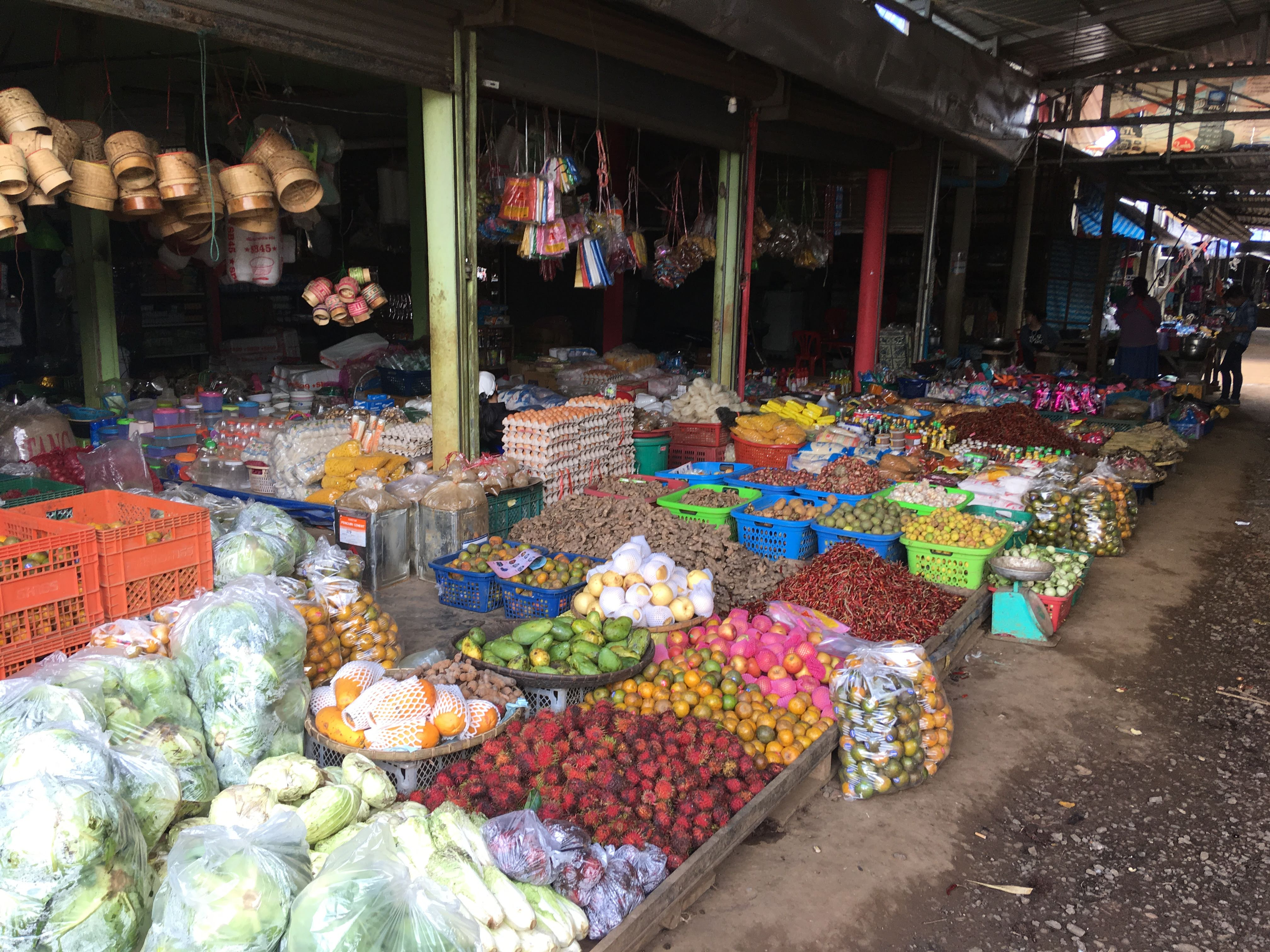
- Tha Teng market
- Interactive map of Tha Teng district
- Country: Laos
- Province: Sekong
- Time zone: UTC+7 (ICT)

Tha Teng is a district (muang) of Sekong province in southeastern Laos.
