= Ho Chi Minh trail =

Network of roads in Vietnam, Laos, and Cambodia used by the Viet Cong from 1959 to 1975

Hồ Chí Minh Trail
- Đường Trường Sơn
- Southeastern Laos
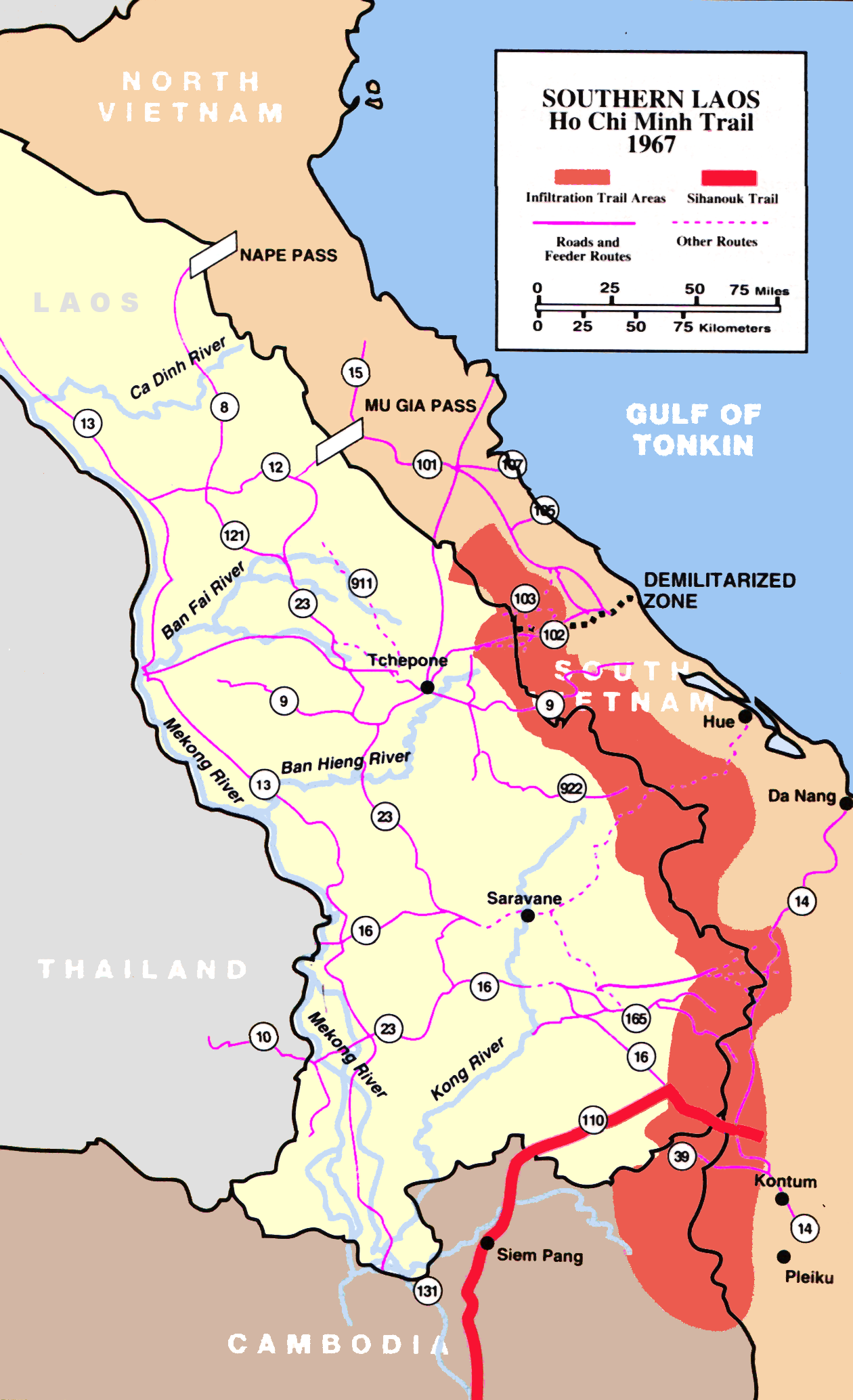
- Ho Chi Minh Trail, 1967

Site information
- Type: Logistical system
- Controlled by: PAVN

Site history
- Built: 1959–1975
- In use: 1959–1975
- Battles/wars: North Vietnamese invasion of Laos; Operation Barrel Roll; Operation Steel Tiger; Operation Tiger Hound; Operation Commando Hunt; Cambodian Incursion; Operation Lam Son 719; Ho Chi Minh Campaign; Operation Left Jab; Operation Honorable Dragon; Operation Diamond Arrow; Project Copper; Operation Phiboonpol; Operation Sayasila; Operation Bedrock; Operation Thao La; Operation Black Lion

Garrison information
- Past commanders: Võ Bẩm; Phan Trọng Tuệ; Đồng Sỹ Nguyên; Hoàng Thế Thiện
- Garrison: 5,000–60,000

The Ho Chi Minh Trail (Vietnamese: Đường mòn Hồ Chí Minh), also called Annamite Range Trail (Vietnamese: Đường Trường Sơn) was a logistical network of roads and trails that ran from North Vietnam to South Vietnam through the kingdoms of Laos and Cambodia. The system provided support, in the form of manpower and materiel, to the Viet Cong (or "VC") and the People's Army of Vietnam (PAVN), during the Vietnam War. Construction for the network began following the North Vietnamese invasion of Laos in July 1959. At the time it was believed to be the main supply route, however it later transpired that the Sihanouk Trail which ran through Cambodia was handling significantly more material.

It was named by the U.S. after the North Vietnamese leader Hồ Chí Minh. The origin of the name is presumed to have come from the First Indochina War, when there was a Viet Minh maritime logistics line called the "Route of Ho Chi Minh". Shortly after late 1960, as the present trail developed, Agence France-Presse (AFP) announced that a north–south trail had opened, naming the corridor La Piste de Hồ Chí Minh, the 'Hồ Chí Minh Trail'. The trail ran mostly in Laos, and was called the Trường Sơn Strategic Supply Route (Đường Trường Sơn) by the communists, after the Vietnamese name for the Annamite Range in central Vietnam. They further identified the trail as either West Trường Sơn (Laos) or East Trường Sơn (Vietnam).

According to the U.S. National Security Agency's official history of the war, the trail system was "one of the great achievements of military engineering of the 20th century". The trail effectively supplied troops fighting in the south – an unparalleled military feat, considering it was the site of the single most intense air interdiction campaign in history.

== Origins (1959–1965) ==
Parts of what became the trail had existed for centuries as primitive footpaths that enabled trade. The terrain was among the most challenging in Southeast Asia, a sparsely populated region of rugged mountains 500–2,400 metres (1,500–8,000 ft) in elevation, triple-canopy jungle and dense tropical rainforests. Pre-First Indochina War, the routes were known as the "Southward March", "Eastward March", "Westward March", and "Northward March". During the First Indochina War the Việt Minh maintained north–south communications and logistics by expanding on this system of trails and paths, and called the routes the "Trans-West Supply Line" (running in south Vietnam, Cambodia, and Thailand) and the "Trans-Indochina Link" (running in north Vietnam, Laos, and Thailand).

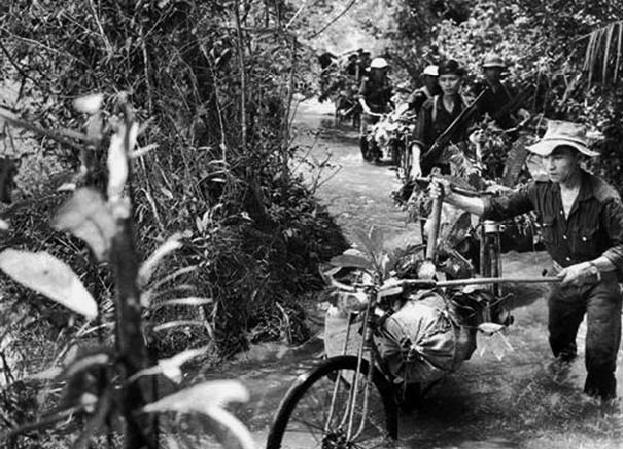
In the early days of the Ho Chi Minh Trail, bicycles were often used to transport arms and equipment from North to South Vietnam.

In May 1958 PAVN and Pathet Lao forces seized the transportation hub at Tchepone, on Laotian Route 9. Laotian elections in May brought a right-wing government to power in Laos, increasing dependence on U.S. military and economic aid and an increasingly antagonistic attitude toward North Vietnam.

PAVN forces, alongside the Pathet Lao, invaded Laos on 28 July 1959, with fighting all along the border with North Vietnam against the Royal Lao Army (RLA). In September 1959, Hanoi established the 559th Transportation Group, headquartered at Na Kai, Houaphan province in northeast Laos close to the border. It was under the command of Colonel (later General) Võ Bẩm and established to improve and maintain a transportation system to supply the VC insurgency against the South Vietnamese government. Initially, the North Vietnamese effort concentrated on infiltration across and immediately below the Vietnamese Demilitarized Zone (DMZ) that separated the two Vietnams. The 559th Group "flipped" its line of communications to the west side of the Trường Sơn mountains.

By 1959, the 559th had 6,000 personnel in two regiments alone, the 70th and 71st, not including combat troops in security roles or North Vietnamese and Laotian civilian laborers. In the early days of the conflict the trail was used strictly for the infiltration of manpower. At the time, Hanoi could supply its southern allies much more efficiently by sea. In 1959 the North Vietnamese created Transportation Group 759, which was equipped with 20 steel-hulled vessels to carry out such infiltration.

After the initiation of U.S. naval interdiction efforts in coastal waters, known as Operation Market Time, the trail had to do double duty. Materiel sent from the north was stored in caches in the border regions that were soon retitled "Base Areas" (BA), which, in turn, became sanctuaries for VC and PAVN forces seeking respite and resupply after conducting operations in South Vietnam.

=== Base areas ===
There were five large base areas in the panhandle of Laos (see map). BA 604 was the main logistical center during the war. From there, the coordination and distribution of men and supplies into South Vietnam's Military Region (MR) I and BAs further south was accomplished.

- BA 611 facilitated transport from BA 604 to BA 609. Supply convoys moved in both directions. It also fed fuel and ammunition to BA 607 and on into South Vietnam's A Shau Valley.
- BA 612 was used for support of the B-3 Front in the Central Highlands of South Vietnam.
- BA 614, between Savannakhet, Laos and Kham Duc, South Vietnam was used primarily for moving men and materiel into MR 2 and to the B-3 Front.
- BA 609 was important due to a fine road network that made it possible to transport supplies during the rainy season.

Human labour, pushing heavily laden bicycles, driving oxcarts, or acting as human pack animals, moving hundreds of tonnes of supplies in this fashion was quickly supplanted by truck transport—using Soviet, Chinese, or Eastern Bloc models—which quickly became the chief means of moving supplies and troops. As early as December 1961, the 3rd Truck Transportation Group of PAVN's General Rear Services Department had become the first motor transport unit fielded by North Vietnamese to work the trail and the use of motor transport escalated.

Two types of units served under the 559th Group: "Binh Trams" (BT) and commo-liaison units. A "Binh Tram" was the equivalent of a regimental logistical headquarters and was responsible for securing a particular section of the network. While separate units were tasked with security, engineering, and communications functions, a "Binh Tram" provided the logistical necessities. Usually located one day's march from one another, communication-liaison units were responsible for providing food, housing, medical care and guides to the next way-station. By April 1965, command of the 559th Group devolved upon General Phan Trọng Tuệ, who assumed command of 24,000 men in six truck transportation battalions, two bicycle transportation battalions, a boat transportation battalion, eight engineer battalions, and 45 commo-liaison stations. The motto of the 559th became "Build roads to advance, fight the enemy to travel."

There were nine Binh Trams between the dry season of 1967 to August 1968. An example is Binh Tram 31:

They took responsibility from the Mu Gia Pass to Lum Bum (Route 128) and all the roads from Route 12 to Kontum, Route 129 from Ca Vat to Na Phi Lang. Within this BT there were: 25th and 27th Engineer Battalions; 101st and 53rd Truck Transport Battalions; 14th AAA Battalion; two infantry companies; 8th Guide Battalion (soldiers to take troops and trucks from one station to the next); three stores companies; a communications company; a medical care unit; three teams of surgeons; a quarantine unit; and a workshop to repair trucks.

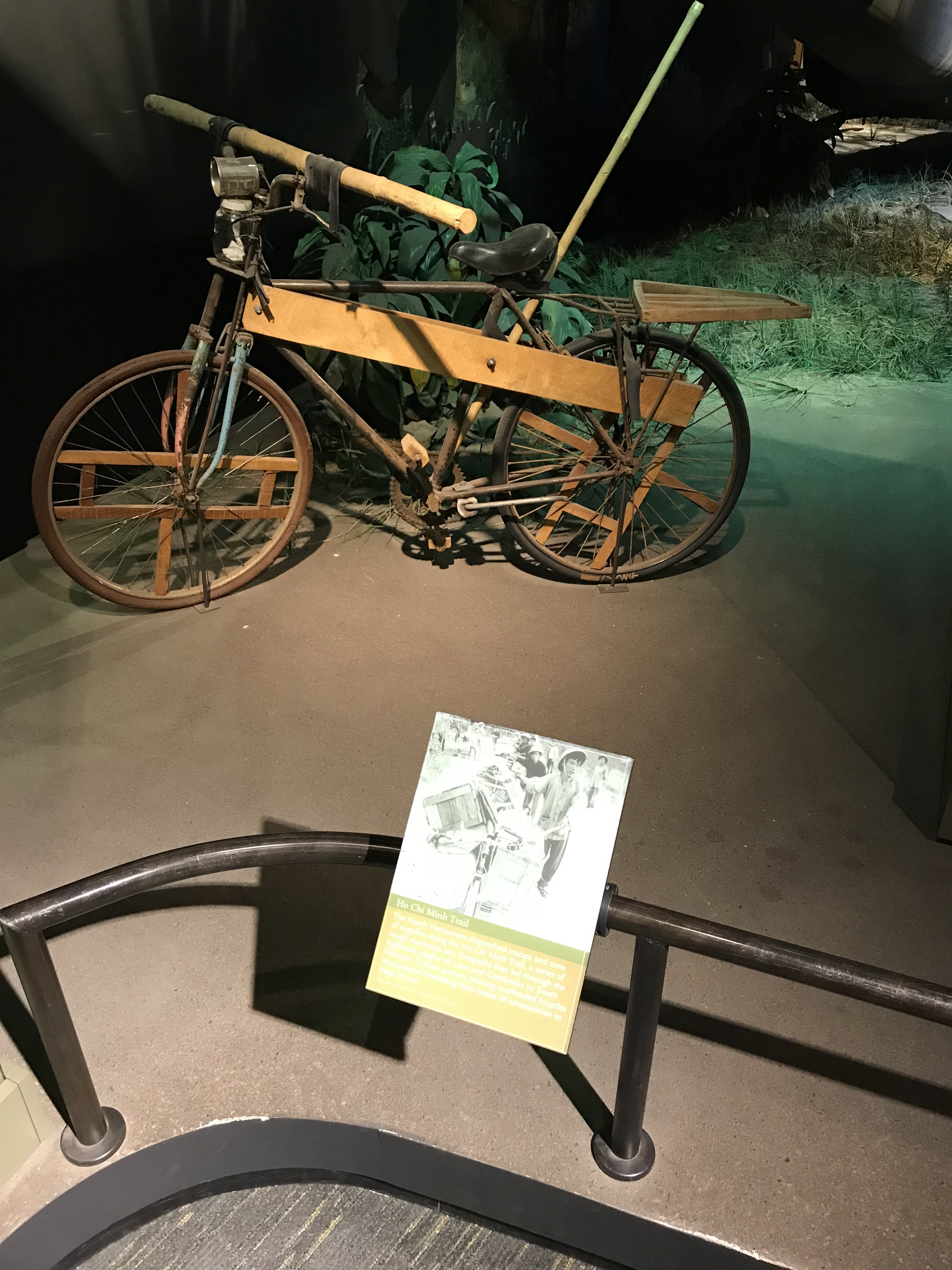
Bicycle used by communist forces on the Ho Chi Minh Trail to transport supplies. National Museum of American History, Washington, D.C.

The system developed into an intricate maze of 5.5-metre-wide (18 ft) dirt roads (paved with gravel and corduroyed in some areas), foot and bicycle paths and truck parks. There were numerous supply bunkers, storage areas, barracks, hospitals, and command and control facilities, all concealed from aerial observation by an intricate system of natural and man-made camouflage that was constantly improved. By 1973, trucks could drive the entire length of the trail without emerging from the canopy except to ford streams or cross them on crude bridges built beneath the water's surface.

The weather in southeastern Laos came to play a large role both in the supply effort and in U.S. and South Vietnamese efforts to interdict it. The southwest monsoon (commonly called the rainy season) from mid-May to mid-September, brought heavy precipitation (70% of 3,800 mm (150 in) per year). The sky was usually overcast with high temperatures. The northwest monsoon (the dry season), from mid-October to mid-March was relatively dry with lower temperatures. Since the road network in the trail system was generally dirt, the bulk of supply transport, and the military efforts that they supported, were conducted during the dry season. Eventually, the bulk of the trail was either asphalted or hard packed, thus allowing large quantities of supplies to be moved even during the rainy season.

== Interdiction and expansion (1965–1968) ==
In 1961 U.S. intelligence analysts estimated that 5,843 enemy infiltrators (actually 4,000) had moved south on the trail; in 1962, 12,675 (actually 5,300); in 1963, 7,693 (actually 4,700); and in 1964, 12,424. The supply capacity of the trail reached 20 to 30 tonnes per day in 1964 and it was estimated by the U.S. that 12,000 (actually 9,000) PAVN soldiers had reached South Vietnam that year. By 1965 the U.S. command in Saigon estimated that communist supply requirements for their southern forces amounted to 234 tons of all supplies per day and that 195 tons were moving through Laos.

U.S. Defense Intelligence Agency (DIA) analysts concluded that during the 1965 Laotian dry season the enemy was moving 30 trucks per day (90 tonnes) over the trail, far above the Saigon estimate.

U.S. officials had only estimates of its enemy's capabilities; intelligence collection agencies often conflicted with each other. Thanks to improvements to the trail system (including opening new routes that would connect to the Sihanouk Trail in Cambodia), the quantity of supplies transported during 1965 almost equaled the combined total for the previous five years. During the year interdiction of the system had become one of the top American priorities, but operations against it were complicated by the limited forces available at the time and Laos's ostensible neutrality.

The intricacies of Laotian affairs, and U.S. and North Vietnamese interference in them, led to a mutual policy of each ignoring the other, at least in the public eye. This did not prevent the North Vietnamese from violating Lao neutrality by protecting and expanding their supply conduit, and by supporting their Pathet Lao allies in their war against the central government. U.S. intervention came in the form of building and supporting a CIA-backed clandestine army in its fight with the communists and constant bombing of the trail. They also provided support for the Lao government.

=== Air operations against the trail ===
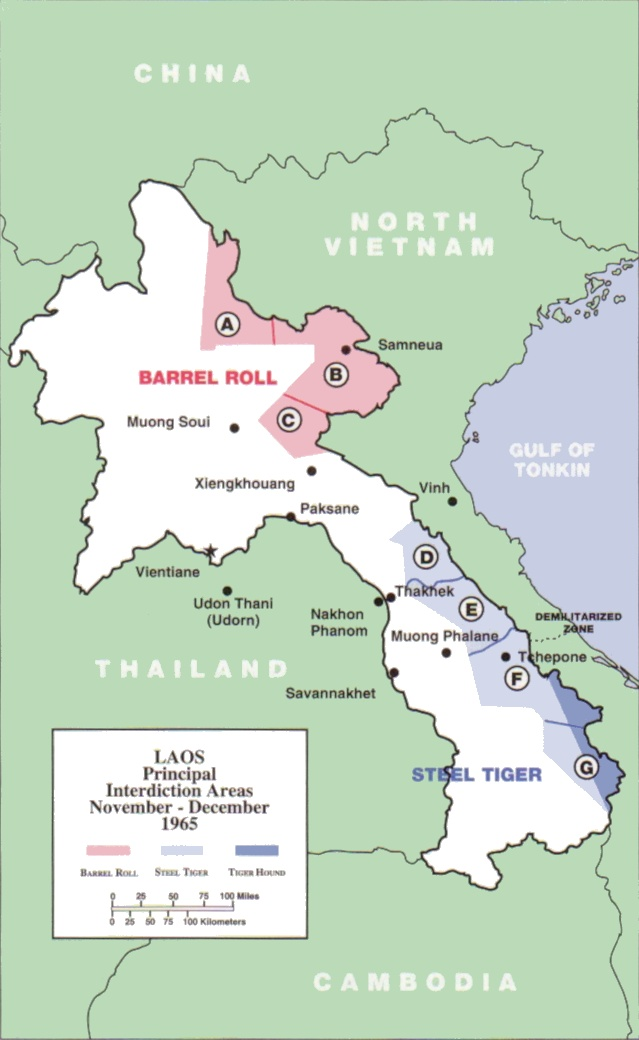
Barrel Roll • Steel Tiger • Tiger Hound areas of operations

On 14 December 1964, the U.S. Air Force's (USAF) "Operation Barrel Roll" carried out the first systematic bombardment of the Hồ Chí Minh Trail in Laos. On 20 March 1965, after the initiation of Operation Rolling Thunder against North Vietnam, President Lyndon B. Johnson approved a corresponding escalation against the trail system. "Barrel Roll" continued in northeastern Laos while the southern panhandle was bombed in "Operation Steel Tiger".

By mid-year the number of sorties being flown had grown from 20 to 1,000 per month. In January 1965, the U.S. command in Saigon requested control over bombing operations in the areas of Laos adjacent to South Vietnam's five northernmost provinces, claiming that the area was part of the "extended battlefield". The request was granted by the Joint Chiefs of Staff. The area fell under the auspices of "Operation Tiger Hound".

Political considerations complicated aerial operations. But the seasonal monsoons that hindered communist supply operations in Laos also hampered the interdiction effort. These efforts were hindered by morning fog and overcast, and by the smoke and haze produced by the slash-and-burn agriculture practiced by the indigenous population. During 1968 the USAF undertook two experimental operations that it hoped would worsen the monsoons. "Project Popeye" was an attempt to indefinitely extend the rainy season over southeastern Laos by cloud seeding. Testing on the project began in September above the Kong River watershed that ran through the Steel Tiger and Tiger Hound areas. Clouds were seeded by air with silver iodide smoke and then activated by launching a fuse fired from a flare pistol. Fifty-six tests were conducted by October; 85% were judged to be successful. President Johnson then gave authorization for the program, which lasted until July 1972.

Testing on the second operation, "Project Commando Lava", began on 17 May: scientists from Dow Chemical had created a chemical concoction that, when mixed with rainwater, destabilized the soil and created mud. The program drew enthusiasm from its military and civilian participants, who claimed that they were there to "make mud, not war." In some areas it worked, depending on the makeup of the soil. The chemicals were dropped by C-130A aircraft, but the overall effect on North Vietnamese interdiction was minimal and the experiment was cancelled.

==== Defoliation ====
In December 1965 the USAF began its first Operation Ranch Hand defoliation missions against the trail in Laos using both Agent Blue and Agent Orange defoliants. More than 210 missions took place, spraying approximately 1.8 million litres of defoliants. Unlike Laos, the trail in Cambodia was not systematically targeted for defoliation, although more than ten missions were mounted against the Parrot's Beak area, spraying approximately 155,000 litres of Agent Orange.

=== Ground operations against the trail ===
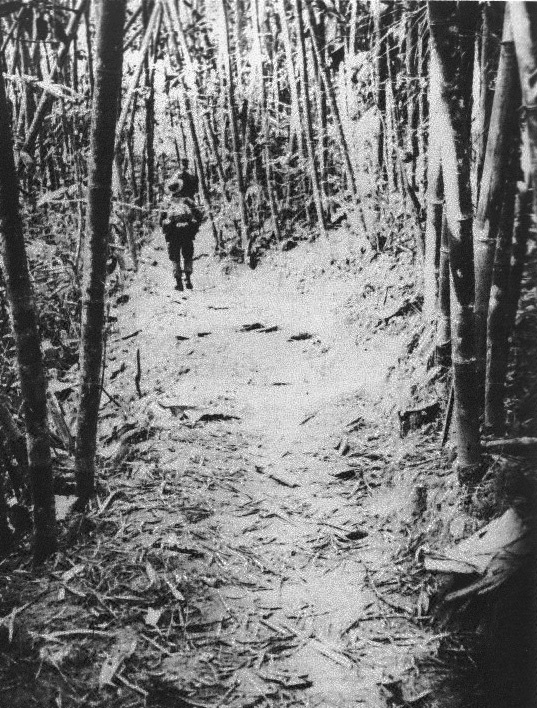
PAVN troops on the trail (photo taken by a U.S. MACV-SOG team)

On the ground, the CIA and the RLA had initially been given the responsibility of stopping, slowing, or, at the very least, observing the enemy's infiltration effort. In Laos, the agency began Operation Pincushion in 1962 to accomplish that goal. The operation evolved into Operation Hardnose, in which CIA-backed Laotian irregular reconnaissance team operations took place.

In October 1965, General Westmoreland received authorization to launch a U.S. cross-border recon effort. On 18 October 1965, the first mission was launched "across the fence" into Laos by the Military Assistance Command, Vietnam Studies and Observations Group (MACV-SOG). This was the beginning of an ever-expanding reconnaissance effort by MACV-SOG that would continue until the operation was disbanded in 1972. Another weapon in the U.S. arsenal was unleashed upon the trail on 10 December 1965, when the first B-52 Stratofortress bomber strike was conducted in Laos.

A common historical perspective supports the efficacy of the campaigns (despite their failure to halt or slow infiltration), as they did restrict enemy materiel and manpower in Laos and Cambodia. This viewpoint pervaded some official U.S. government histories of the conflict. John Schlight said of the PAVN's logistical apparatus, "This sustained effort, requiring the full-time activities of tens of thousands of soldiers, who might otherwise have been fighting in South Vietnam, seems proof positive that the bombing of the Ho Chi Minh Trail had disrupted the North Vietnamese war effort."

Despite U.S. anti-infiltration efforts, the estimated number of PAVN infiltrators for 1966 was between 58,000 and 90,000 troops, including five full enemy regiments. A June 1966 DIA estimate credited the North Vietnamese with 1,000 km (600 mi) of passable roads within the corridor, at least 300 km (200 mi) of which were good enough for year-round use. In 1967 Senior Colonel (later General) Đồng Sỹ Nguyên assumed command of the 559th Group. In comparison to the above DIA estimate, by the end of the year the North Vietnamese had completed 2,959 km of vehicle capable roads, including 275 kilometers of main roads, 576 kilometers of bypasses, and 450 entry roads and storage areas.

It was learned by U.S. intelligence that the enemy was using the Kong and Bang Fai Rivers to transport food, fuel, and munitions shipments by loading materiel into half-filled steel drums and then launching them into the rivers. They were later collected downstream by nets and booms. Unknown to the U.S., the North Vietnamese had also begun to transport and store more than 81,000 tonnes of supplies "to be utilized in a future offensive". That future offensive was launched during the lunar new year Tết holiday of 1968, and to prepare for it, 200,000 PAVN troops, including seven infantry regiments and 20 independent battalions, made the trip south.

Throughout the war, ground operations by conventional units were somewhat limited to brief incursions into border sanctuaries. One notable operation was Dewey Canyon which took place from 22 January to 18 March 1969 in I Corps. During the operation, the 9th Marine Regiment attempted to interdict PAVN activity in the Da Krong River and A Shau Valleys. Ground units briefly entered the border areas of Laos during fighting with elements of the PAVN 9th Regiment.

== Operation Commando Hunt (1968–1970) ==
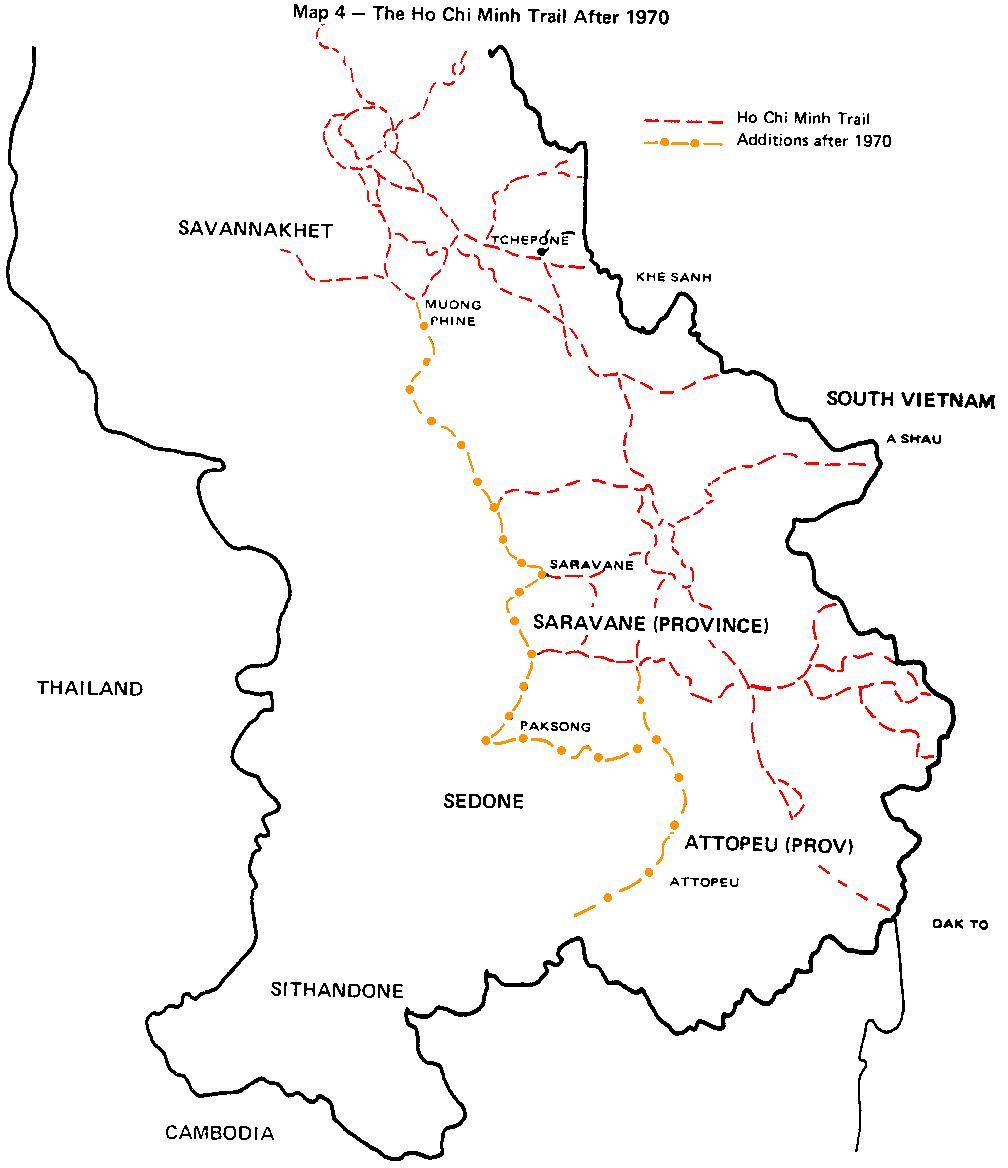
The Ho Chi Minh Trail, 1970.

In the wake of the Tet Offensive, the North Vietnamese expanded and modernized their logistical effort. The number of supply and maintenance personnel dropped, mainly due to increased use of motor and river transport and mechanized construction equipment. The CIA estimated during the year that the 559th Group was using 20 bulldozers, 11 road graders, three rock crushers, and two steamrollers for maintenance and new road construction.

As many as 43,000 North Vietnamese or Laotians were engaged in operating, improving, or extending the system. In 1969, 433,000 tonnes of ordnance fell on Laos. This was made possible by the end of "Operation Rolling Thunder" and the commencement of "Operation Commando Hunt" in November 1968. U.S. aircraft were freed for interdiction missions and as many as 500 per day were flying over Laos. By the end of 1968, bombing missions over southern Laos had climbed 300 percent, from 4,700 sorties in October to 12,800 in November.

This round-the-clock aerial effort was directed by "Operation Igloo White", run out of Nakhon Phanom, Thailand. It was composed of three parts: strings of air-dropped acoustic and seismic sensors collected intelligence on the trail; computers at the Intelligence Collection Center (ICS) in Thailand collated the information and predicted convoy paths and speeds; and an airborne relay and control aircraft which received the signals from the sensors and routed aircraft to targets as directed by the ICS.

This effort was supported by MACV-SOG recon teams, who, besides carrying out recon, wiretap, and bomb damage assessment missions for "Commando Hunt", also hand-placed sensors for "Igloo White". Personnel interdiction was abandoned by early-1969. The sensor system was not sophisticated enough to detect enemy personnel, so the effort was given up until "Operation Island Tree" in late-1971. A revelation for U.S. intelligence analysts in late 1968 was the discovery of a petroleum pipeline running southwest from the northern port of Vinh.

=== Fuel pipeline ===
Initially, fuel was carried by porters, but this was inefficient and time-consuming, and thus highlighted the need to extend the pipeline at a much faster rate. The responsibility to build the pipeline fell to Lieutenant Colonel Phan Tu Quang, who became the first Chief of the Fuel Supply Department, and Major Mai Trong Phuoc, who was the Commander of Road Work Team 18, the secret name for the workers who built the pipeline.

Early in 1969, the pipeline crossed the Lao frontier through the Mu Gia Pass and, by 1970, it reached the approaches to the A Shau Valley in South Vietnam. The plastic pipeline, equipped with numerous small pumping stations, managed to transfer diesel fuel, gasoline, and kerosene all through the same pipe. Due to the efforts of the PAVN 592nd Pipelaying Regiment, the number of pipelines entering Laos increased to six that year.

The 559th Group, still under the command of General Đồng Sỹ Nguyên, was made the equivalent of a Military Region in 1970 and the group was given the additional name, the "Truong Son Army". It was composed of four units, one division and three equivalent units: the 968th Infantry Division; 470th Group; 565th MAG; and 571st Rear Group. The units controlled fuel pipeline battalions.

In July 1971, the Truong Son Army was reorganized into five divisional headquarters: the 470th, 471st, 472nd, 473rd, and the 571st. The group consisted of four truck transportation regiments, two petroleum pipeline regiments, three anti-aircraft artillery (AAA) regiments, eight engineer regiments, and the 968th Infantry Division. By the end of 1970 the 559th was running 27 "Binh Trams", which transported 40,000 tonnes of supplies with a 3.4% loss rate during the year.

Colonel Quang and Major Phuoc would eventually build 5,000 km of pipeline and ship over 270,000 tonnes of petrol. Sections of the pipeline were still in use in the 1990s.

=== Truck relay system ===
Trucked supplies traveled in convoys from North Vietnam in relays, with trucks shuttling from one way station to the next. The vehicles were then unloaded and reloaded onto "fresh" trucks at each station. If a truck was disabled or destroyed, it was replaced from the assets of the next northern station and so on until it was replaced by a new one in North Vietnam. Eventually, the last commo-liaison station in Laos or Cambodia was reached and the vehicles were unloaded. The supplies were then cached, loaded onto watercraft, or man-portered into South Vietnam.

Due to the increased effectiveness of "Commando Hunt", North Vietnamese transportation units usually took to the roads only at dusk with traffic peaking in the early morning hours. As U.S. aircraft came on station, traffic would subside until just before dawn, when fixed-wing gunships and night bombers returned to their bases. The trucks then began rolling again, reaching another peak in traffic around 06:00 as drivers hurried to get into truck parks before sunrise and the arrival of the morning waves of U.S. fighter bombers. By the last phase of "Commando Hunt" (October 1970 – April 1972), the average daily number of U.S. aircraft flying interdiction missions included 182 attack fighters, 13 fixed-wing gunships, and 21 B-52s.

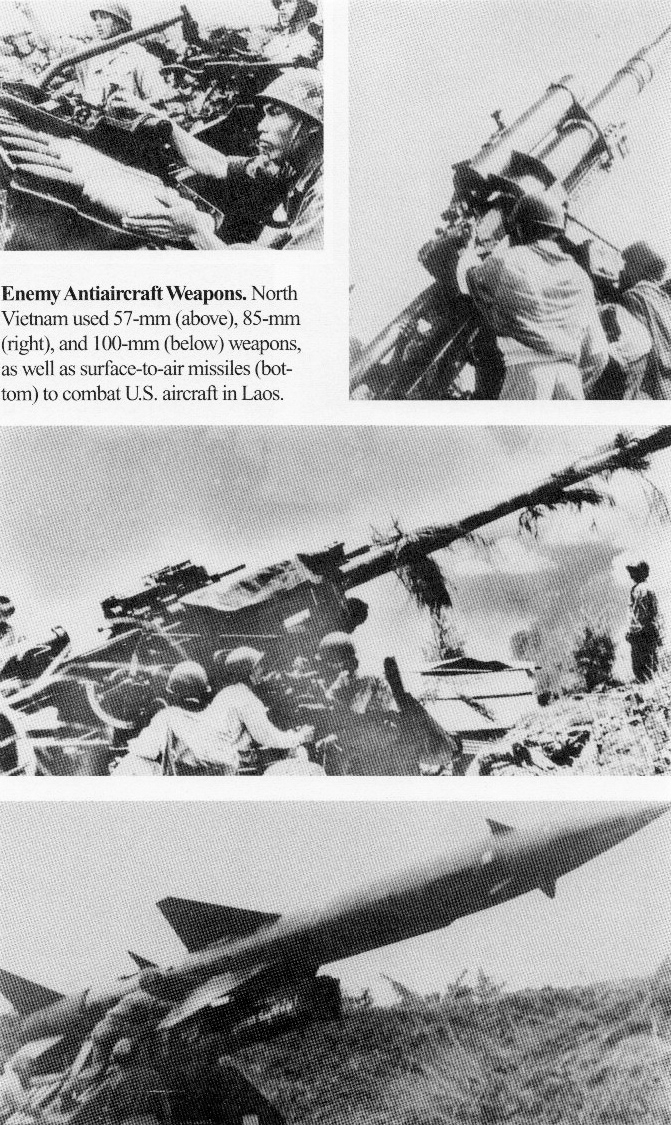
The evolution of PAVN anti-aircraft weapons, 1965–1972.

The North Vietnamese also responded to the American aerial threat by the increased use of heavy concentrations of anti-aircraft artillery. By 1968 this was mainly composed of 37 mm and 57 mm radar-controlled weapons. The next year, 85 mm and 100 mm guns appeared, and by the end of Commando Hunt, over 1,500 guns defended the system.

Of all the weapons systems used against the trail, according to the official North Vietnamese history of the conflict, the AC-130 Spectre fixed-wing gunship was the most formidable adversary. The Spectres "established control over and successfully suppressed, to a certain extent at least, our nighttime supply operations". The history claimed that allied aircraft destroyed some 4,000 trucks during the 1970–71 dry season, of which the C-130s alone destroyed 2,432 trucks.

A Spectre countermeasure was unveiled on 29 March 1972, when a Spectre was shot down on a night mission by a surface-to-air SA-7 missile near Tchepone. This was the first U.S. aircraft shot down by a SAM that far south during the conflict. PAVN responded to U.S. nighttime bombing by building the 1,000-kilometer-long Road K ("Green Road") from north of Lum Bum to lower Laos. During "Commando Hunt IV" (30 April–9 October 1971), U.S., South Vietnamese and Laotian forces began to feel the North Vietnamese reaction to General Lon Nol's coup in Cambodia and the subsequent closure of the port of Sihanoukville to its supply shipments. As early as 1969 PAVN had begun its largest logistical effort of the entire conflict.

The Laotian towns of Attapeu and Salavan, at the foot of the Bolaven Plateau were seized by the PAVN during 1970, opening the length of the Kong River system into Cambodia. Hanoi also created the 470th Transportation Group to manage the flow of men and supplies to the new battlefields in Cambodia. This new "Liberation Route" turned west from the trail at Muong May, at the south end of Laos, and paralleled the Kong River into Cambodia. Eventually this new route extended past Siem Prang and reached the Mekong River near Stung Treng.

During 1971 PAVN took Paksong and advanced to Pakse, at the heart of the Bolaven Plateau region of Laos. The following year, Khong Sedone fell to the North Vietnamese. The PAVN continued a campaign to clear the eastern flank of the trail that it had begun in 1968. By 1968, U.S. Special Forces camps at Khe Sanh and Khâm Đức, both of which were used by MACV-SOG as forward operations bases for its reconnaissance effort, had either been abandoned or overrun. In 1970, the same fate befell another camp at Dak Seang. What had once been a 30-kilometre-wide (20 mi) supply corridor now stretched for 140 km (90 mi) from east to west.

== Road to PAVN victory (1971–1975) ==
In early-February 1971, 16,000 (later 20,000) ARVN troops crossed the Laotian border along Route 9 and headed for the PAVN logistical center at Tchepone. "Operation Lam Son 719", the long-sought assault on the Ho Chi Minh Trail itself and the ultimate test of the U.S. policy of Vietnamization, had begun. Unfortunately for the South Vietnamese, U.S. ground troops were prohibited by law from participation in the incursion, and the U.S. was restricted to providing air support, artillery fire, and helicopter aviation units.

At first the operation went well, with little resistance from the North Vietnamese. By early March 1971 the situation changed. Hanoi made the decision to stand and fight. It began to muster forces which would eventually number 60,000 PAVN troops as well as several thousand allied Pathet Lao troops and Lao irregulars, outnumbering the ARVN by almost three to one.

The fighting in southeastern Laos was unlike any yet seen in the Vietnam War, since the PAVN abandoned its old hit-and-run tactics and launched a conventional counterattack. The PAVN first launched massed infantry attacks supported by armor and heavy artillery to crush ARVN positions on the flanks of the main advance. Coordinated anti-aircraft fire made tactical air support and resupply difficult and costly, with 108 helicopters shot down and 618 others damaged.

PAVN forces began to squeeze in on the main line of the ARVN advance. Although an airborne assault managed to seize Tchepone, it was a useless victory, as the South Vietnamese could only hold the town for a short period before being withdrawn due to attacks on the main column. The only way the invasion force managed to extricate itself from Laos was through the massive application of U.S. air support. By 25 March 1971, the last ARVN troops recrossed the border, closely followed by their enemy. As a test of Vietnamization, "Lam Son 719" failed; half of the invasion force was lost during the operation.

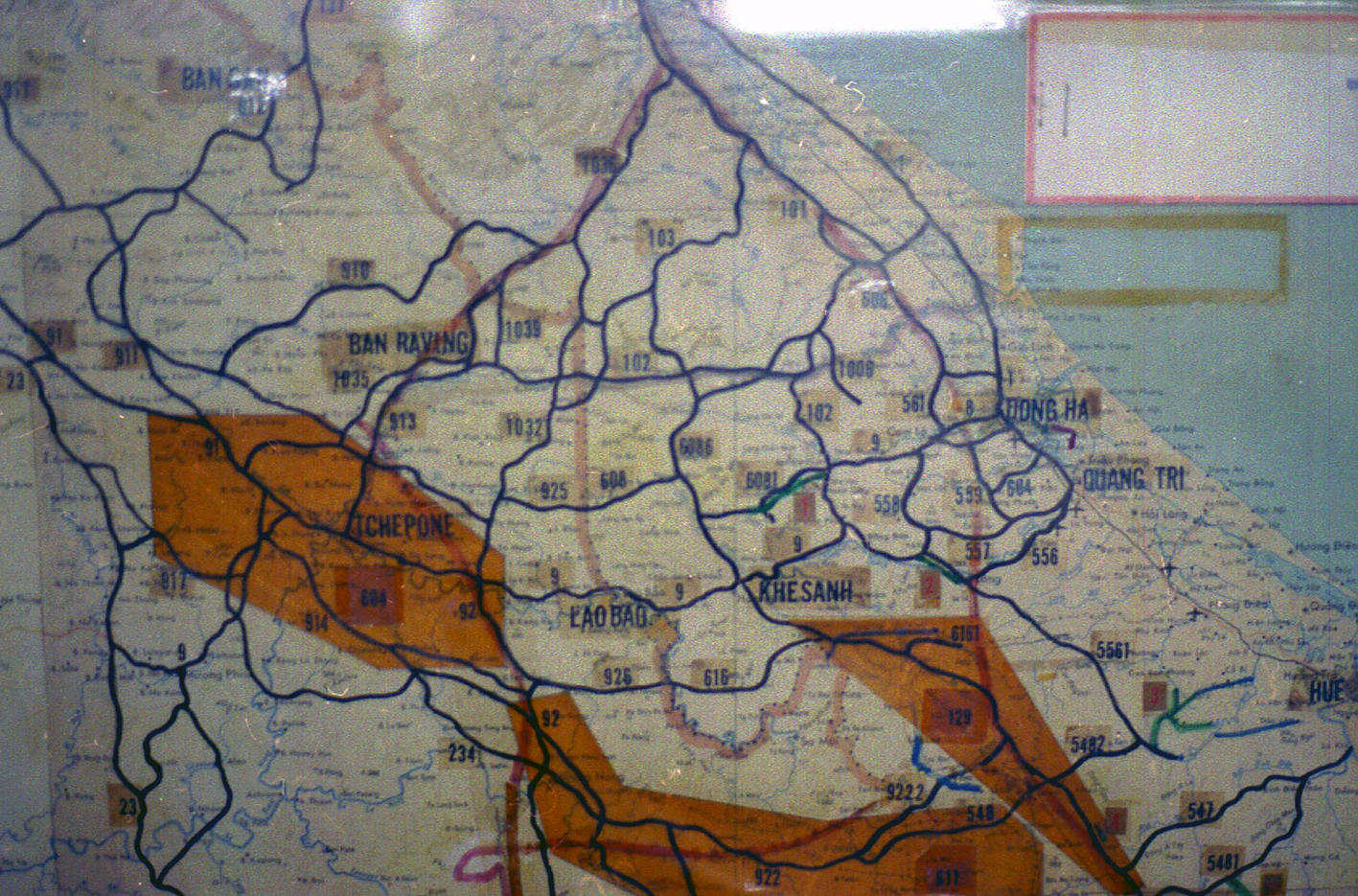
Map displayed at the Reunification Palace in Vietnam. Dated 28 January 1973, it was used by the US and RVN to build intelligence on the trail.

South Vietnamese troops were poorly led and the elite Ranger and Airborne elements had been decimated. "Lam Son 719" did manage to postpone a planned PAVN offensive against the northern provinces of South Vietnam for one year. By spring 1972 the Americans and South Vietnamese realized that the enemy was planning a major offensive, but did not know where or when. The answer came on 30 March 1972 when 30,000 PAVN troops, supported by more than 300 tanks, crossed the border and invaded Quảng Trị Province. The "Nguyen Hue Offensive"—better known as the "Easter Offensive"—was underway.

As South Vietnamese forces were on the verge of collapse, President Richard M. Nixon responded by increasing the magnitude of the U.S. air support. Due to the withdrawal of U.S. aviation units from Southeast Asia, squadrons were flown into South Vietnam from Japan and the U.S. itself. The effort failed to halt the fall of Quảng Trị City on 2 May, seemingly sealing the fate of the four northernmost provinces. The North Vietnamese then launched two further attacks from their base areas in Cambodia, the first aimed to seize Kon Tum in the Central Highlands to cut South Vietnam in two; the second provoked a series of battles in and around An Lộc, the capital of Bình Long Province. A total of 14 PAVN divisions were now committed to the offensive. On 13 May 1972, South Vietnam launched a counteroffensive with four divisions backed by massive U.S. air support. By 17 May, Quảng Trị City was retaken, but the South Vietnamese military ran out of steam. The PAVN thrusts against Kon Tum and An Lộc were contained. Due to the adoption of a conventional offensive and the logistical effort needed to sustain it, U.S. airpower was particularly effective and PAVN casualties were high. The North Vietnamese suffered approximately 100,000 casualties while the South Vietnamese suffered 30,000 fatalities during the fighting.

The seizure of territory within South Vietnam itself allowed Hanoi to extend the trail across the border with Laos and into that country. The signing of the Paris Peace Accords seemed to bring the conflict in Southeast Asia to an end. The last U.S. forces departed in March 1973. Both North and South Vietnamese were to maintain control in the areas under their influence and negotiations between the two nations, possibly leading to a coalition government and unification, were to take place. Jockeying for control of more territory, both sides flagrantly violated the ceasefire and open hostilities began anew.

By 1973, the PAVN logistical system consisted of a two-lane paved (with crushed limestone and gravel) highway that ran from the mountain passes of North Vietnam to the Chu Pong Massif in South Vietnam. By 1974 it was possible to travel a completely paved four-lane route from the Central Highlands to Tây Ninh Province, northwest of Saigon. The single oil pipeline that had once terminated near the A Shau Valley now consisted of four lines (the largest 20 cm [eight inches] in diameter) and extended south to Lộc Ninh. In July 1973 the 259th Group was redesignated the Truong Son Command, the regimental sectors were converted to divisions, and the binh trams were designated as regiments. By late 1974 forces under the new command included AAA Division 377, Transportation Division 571, Engineering Division 473, the 968th Infantry Division, and sectoral divisions 470, 471, and 472.

Command then devolved upon PAVN Major General Hoàng Thế Thiện. In December 1974 the first phase of a limited PAVN offensive in South Vietnam began. Its success inspired Hanoi to try for an expanded but still limited, offensive to improve its bargaining position with Saigon. In March, General Văn Tiến Dũng launched "Campaign 275", the success of which prompted the general to push Hanoi for a final all-out offensive to take all of South Vietnam. After an ineffective attempt to halt the offensive, Saigon fell to North Vietnamese forces on 30 April 1975.

== See also ==
- Ho Chi Minh Highway
