= Military Regions of Laos =

Beginning in 1955, the Kingdom of Laos was divided into five Military Regions (MR), roughly corresponding to the areas of the country's 13 provinces. The Military Regions were necessitated by the poor lines of communication within the country. The Military Districts were the basis of a culture of warlordism in the Royal Lao Armed Forces (FAR) high command, with most MR Commanders running their zones like private fiefdoms.

== Overall view ==
Laos covers approximately 235,000 square kilometers (91,000 square miles). In the early 1950s, there were few means of transportation available in the Kingdom of Laos. Travelling by riverboat through the Mekong River was still the most reliable means of transporting people and goods in-country. Laos, newly independent from the French, had bequeathed fewer than 1,500 kilometers of all-weather paved roads. The purpose of the French colonial roadbuilding program had not been the interconnection of Laos' provinces, but rather linkage with Vietnam. Air transportation in Laos depended on half a dozen airports and auxiliary airfields that could not accommodate anything larger than twin-engine aircraft. With such barely developed transport infrastructure, the defense of the country was entrusted to local troops raised in and stationed at military districts reflecting French traditions, designated "Military Regions" (French: Régions Militaires), which encompassed two or more provinces. As a result of this decentralized organization, the FAR General Staff in Vientiane served primarily an administrative function, exerting little control over the regional commands and local commanders were free to adjust their tactics to the local situation. Consequently, Laotian commanders of the Military Regions became warlords within their regions. A top command position within a Military Region was dependent upon the influence of an urban elite aristocratic family or families who economically and politically dominated the MR. If a general was not a scion of one of these families, then he had their support in some other manner.

== Military Region 1 ==
The provinces of Military Region 1 (French: Région Militaire 1) are listed and mapped below. Headquartered at Luang Prabang the MR 1 was the largest, covering the whole of North-western Laos. The region was dominated by the Lao Royal family and the former Commander-in-Chief of the Royal Lao Army, Major general Ouane Rattikone. Its original appointee to command it in 1955 was Major (later, General) Ouane Rattikone. In late 1962, the MR 1 was commanded by Colonel (later, Brigadier general) Sourith Don Sasorith, later replaced by Brigadier general Tiao Sayvong, a half-brother of the King.

Location	Name	Capital	Area (km^{2})	Remarks
	Bokèo Province	Houayxay District (Ban Houayxay)	4,970	
	Luang Namtha Province	Namtha District (Luang Namtha)	9,325	
	Louangphabang Province	Louangphrabang District (Luang Prabang)	16,875	Luang Prabang city was the MR 1 headquarters
	Oudômxai Province	Xay District (Muang Xay)	15,370	
	Phôngsali Province	Phongsaly District (Phongsali)	16,270	
	Xaignabouli Province	Xayabury District (Sainyabuli)	11,795	Became Military Region 6 from early 1962 through July 1968

== Military Region 2 ==
The provinces of Military Region 2 (French: Région Militaire 2) are mapped and listed below. Initially headquartered at Vientiane and later at Long Tieng northwest of the Plain of Jars in the Xiangkhoang Province, the MR 2 covered the North-eastern Laos. Its original military commander in 1955 was Major (later, General) Sang Kittirath, replaced in mid-1962 by Colonel Khamkong Bouddavong. It was later placed under the command of Major general Vang Pao, the Hmong (Meo) guerrilla war hero of Laos.

Location	Name	Capital	Area (km^{2})	Remarks
	Bolikhamxai Province	Paksane District (Pakxan)	16,470	
	Houaphan Province	Xamneua District (Xam Neua)	16,500	
	Vientiane Province	Vientiane Prefecture (also national administrative capital)	19,847	City of Vientiane was both the national capital and early Military Region 5 headquarters
	Xiangkhouang Province	Pek District (Phonsavan)	15,880	

== Military Region 3 ==
The provinces of Military Region 3 (French: Région Militaire 3) are mapped and listed below. Headquartered at Savannakhet, capital of Savannakhet Province, the MR 3 covered the upper Laotian panhandle in central Laos. Its original commanding officer in 1955 was Major (later, General) Sing Rattanasamy. In late 1962, this region was commanded by Colonel Lam Ngeum, replaced on 1 July 1971 by Colonel (later, Brigadier general) Nouphet Daoheuang. The real power in this Region was in the hands of the Insixiengmay family led by Royal Lao Government Minister Leuam Insixiengmay, Vice-Premier and Minister of Education (his wife was the elder sister of Mom bouanphan, herself the wife of Prince Boun Oum Na Champassak).

Location	Name	Capital	Area (km^{2})	Remarks
	Khammouan Province	Thakhek District (Thakhek)	16,315	
	Savannakhét Province	Khanthabouly District (Savannakhet)	21,774	

== Military Region 4 ==
The provinces of Military Region 4 (French: Région Militaire 4) are mapped and listed below. Headquartered at Pakse, capital of Champassak Province, the MR 4 covered the lower laotian panhandle comprising the six provinces of southern Laos and was dominated by the Nachampassak family led by Prince Boun Oum Na Champassak. Its original commander in 1955 was Major (later, General) Amkha Soukhavong, succeeded in late 1962 by Colonel (later, Major general) Phasouk Somly Rasaphak, himself a member of the Champassak family, who held the command of this area for almost a decade and a half until 1 July 1971, when he was replaced by Brigadier general Soutchay Vongsavanh.

Location	Name	Capital	Area (km^{2})	Remarks
	Attapu Province	Samakkhixay District (Attapeu)	10,320	
	Champasak Province	Pakse District (Pakse)	15,415	Became Military Region 7 from early 1962 until July 1968
	Salavan Province	Salavan District (Salavan)	10,691	
	Xékong Province	Lamarm District (Sekong)	7,665	

== Military Region 5 ==
Military Region 5 (French: Région Militaire 5) was formed in Summer 1959. Headquartered at Camp Chinaimo, a major FAR military facility located on the eastern outskirts of Vientiane, the MR 5 covered the Capital zone – which included the nation's central government seat and the namesake Vientiane province – and the Borikhane province. Its first commanding officer was Major general Phoumi Nosavan, succeeded in early 1960 by Major general Kouprasith Abhay until he was replaced on 1 July 1971 by Brigadier general Thongligh Chokbengboun.

== Military Region 6 ==
In early 1962 Sainyabuli Province was removed from Military Region 1, and designated as MR 6. It was returned to MR 1 in July 1968. In late 1962, the MR 6 was commanded by Colonel Houmphanh Norasing.

== Military Region 7 ==
In early 1962 Champasak Province was removed from Military Region 4, and designated as MR 7. It was returned to MR 4 in July 1968. In late 1962, the MR 7 was commanded by Colonel Kot Venevongsos.

== See also ==
- Army of the Republic of Vietnam (ARVN)
- Air America
- Hmong people
- North Vietnamese invasion of Laos
- Pathet Lao
- Khmer National Armed Forces
- Laotian Civil War
- Royal Lao Air Force
- Royal Lao Armed Forces
- Royal Lao Army Airborne
- Royal Lao Police
- Vietnam War
- Weapons of the Laotian Civil War
