= Salavan (city) =

Salavan ສາລະວັນ
- District and municipality
- Salavan District
- Salavan District

- City location in Laos
- Coordinates: 15°43′N 106°25′E
- Country: Laos
- Province: Salavan

Population (2015)
  - Total: 100,900
  - Religions: Buddhism
- Time zone: UTC+7 (ICT)

Salavan (Lao: ສາລະວັນ, pronounced [sǎː.lā.wán]) is the capital of Salavan province in southern Laos. It is a provincial district. It is 125 km from Pakse on a partially paved road.

== Geography ==
Salavan is in the southernmost area of Lao. The city is in a forested area. Dozens of indigenous villages of tribes surround Salavan.

== Climate ==
Climate data for Salavan (1991–2020)
Month	Jan	Feb	Mar	Apr	May	Jun	Jul	Aug	Sep	Oct	Nov	Dec	Year
Record high °C (°F)	36.4 (97.5)	38.0 (100.4)	40.5 (104.9)	42.5 (108.5)	42.0 (107.6)	39.0 (102.2)	35.6 (96.1)	35.1 (95.2)	35.5 (95.9)	35.0 (95.0)	36.0 (96.8)	36.1 (97.0)	42.5 (108.5)
Mean daily maximum °C (°F)	31.3 (88.3)	33.3 (91.9)	35.1 (95.2)	35.4 (95.7)	33.5 (92.3)	31.6 (88.9)	30.3 (86.5)	30.1 (86.2)	30.7 (87.3)	31.1 (88.0)	31.0 (87.8)	30.2 (86.4)	32.0 (89.6)
Daily mean °C (°F)	24.5 (76.1)	26.8 (80.2)	29.2 (84.6)	29.8 (85.6)	29.0 (84.2)	28.0 (82.4)	27.2 (81.0)	27.1 (80.8)	27.1 (80.8)	26.8 (80.2)	26.1 (79.0)	24.4 (75.9)	27.2 (81.0)
Mean daily minimum °C (°F)	17.2 (63.0)	19.3 (66.7)	22.8 (73.0)	24.5 (76.1)	25.0 (77.0)	24.9 (76.8)	24.5 (76.1)	24.4 (75.9)	24.1 (75.4)	22.6 (72.7)	20.6 (69.1)	17.8 (64.0)	22.3 (72.1)
Record low °C (°F)	9.0 (48.2)	9.0 (48.2)	13.3 (55.9)	17.0 (62.6)	19.6 (67.3)	21.2 (70.2)	20.0 (68.0)	20.2 (68.4)	18.4 (65.1)	15.5 (59.9)	12.0 (53.6)	9.5 (49.1)	9.0 (48.2)
Average precipitation mm (inches)	3.3 (0.13)	14.9 (0.59)	34.7 (1.37)	81.4 (3.20)	215.2 (8.47)	317.6 (12.50)	482.0 (18.98)	460.7 (18.14)	378.5 (14.90)	125.8 (4.95)	22.8 (0.90)	3.6 (0.14)	2,140.5 (84.27)
Average precipitation days (≥ 1.0 mm)	1	1	4	7	16	19	23	24	20	11	4	1	131
Mean monthly sunshine hours	265.8	242.5	228.8	221.0	194.9	131.7	119.7	115.3	144.2	193.1	221.2	248.1	2,326.4
Source 1: World Meteorological Organization
Source 2: NOAA (extremes), The Yearbook of Indochina (1931-1932)

== Culture ==
Salavan's local culture is influenced by the Lao Loum, lowland Lao who form the majority of the population of the city and country, and hill tribe and former colonial French cultures. Salavan has a "frontier town"-like feel because of the dearth of settlements outside the city.
