= Operation Counterpunch =

- Part of the Laotian Civil War and the Vietnam War
Date	26 September 1970 – 7 January 1971
Location	Plain of Jars in northern Laos
Result	North Vietnamese communist offensive forestalled for month

Belligerents
Laos; Thailand; Supported by United States	North Vietnam; Supported by: Soviet Union; People's Republic of China

Commanders and leaders
(Laos)	

Units involved
(Laos) Groupements Mobile 22; Bataillon Guerrier 227; Auto Defense Choc militia Groupement Mobile 23; A battalion-sized Special Guerrilla Unit; Commando Raiders Forces Armées Neutralistes Bataillon Infanterie 17; United States 21st Special Operations Squadron (Thailand) 15th Infantry Bataillon	Six companies plus scattered garrisons

Operation Counterpunch, waged 26 September 1970 to 7 January 1971, was a military offensive of the Laotian Civil War. Royalist General Vang Pao's guerrilla army regained the vital all-weather forward fighter base at Muang Soui on the Plain of Jars from the People's Army of Vietnam (PAVN). The preemptive Counterpunch was credited with delaying an imminent PAVN wet season offensive for a month. The guerrilla army survived, though still heavily outnumbered by the PAVN.

== Overview ==
Beginning in 1946, France fought the Viet Minh insurrection in French Indochina, including the Kingdom of Laos. When it lost that war, Laotian neutrality was established in the 1954 Geneva Agreements. When France withdrew most of its military in conformity with the treaty, the United States filled the vacuum with purportedly civilian paramilitary instructors. A North Vietnamese-backed communist invaded during the opium harvest season of 1953. It settled in northeastern Laos adjacent to the border of the Democratic Republic of Vietnam.

As the Laotian Civil War began, the Central Intelligence Agency established a secret guerrilla army in the Plain of Jars to oppose this insurgency. Hmong military irregulars fought the communists in defense of their traditional territory in Laos.

== Background ==
After the failure and defeat of Operation Pigfat and Operation Raindance in early 1969, the communists had overrun the Plain of Jars the following year to within ten kilometers of the guerrillas' Long Chieng main base in Military Region 2. As a riposte, Hmong General Vang Pao had launched another spoiling offensive against the pressing communists with Kou Kiet. However, the communists fought back with their own Campaign 139, which largely regained lost ground. Vang Pao countered with Operation Off Balance.

== Operation Thanong Kiet ==
Operation Thanong Kiet (translation: Operation Preserve Honor) was a limited objective offensive meant to clear the way for further action by Hmong General Vang Pao's clandestine army of guerrillas. Although there was apprehension from Headquarters that this assault might spark retribution on the order of Campaign 139, Thanong Kiet was believed necessary if the guerrilla forces were to survive. Scheduled for 3 August 1970, foul weather would delay the start until the 18th. Then Bataillon Guerrier 227 (BG 227) was helilifted into position northwest of North Vietnamese troops from Ban Na with the expectation of driving them from the position. However, nonflying weather reoccurred, and the attack was deprived of tactical air support. The small People's Army of Vietnam (PAVN) garrison resisted vigorously; without air power, BG 227 was unsuccessful.

Gaining Auto Defense Choc (ADC) militia reinforcements from nearby Xieng Dat, BG 227 headed north on 27 August. Their target this time was the all-weather fighter base at Muong Soui, which had earlier fallen to the communists. The Royalists reached the western end of the L-108 airstrip there, only to be repelled by another small cadre of North Vietnamese defenders in mid-September. Despite this lack of success by Thanong Kiet, beginning 26 September 1970 Vang Pao would throw three Counterpunchs.

== Operation Counterpunch and Operation Counterpunch II ==
On 26 September 1970, to begin Operation Counterpunch, Vang Pao sent one of his battalions to raid communist supply caches along Route 4. Meeting little opposition on this sweep, the battalion was redirected on 2 October to recapture a formerly lost stronghold at Khang Kho. On 8 October, they were reinforced and feinted northwards towards the strategically vital Plain of Jars. In conjunction with this, an ad hoc regiment, Groupement Mobile 22 (GM 22) was inserted on the hilltop of Phou Long Mat. On 11 October, the original battalion split into two columns. One of them linked up with GM 22 in the Muang Pot Valley. The other skirted the southwest fringe of the Plain.

In an effort to hold the Royalist gains, Vang Pao sent GM 22 along the western edge of the Plain. Groupement Mobile 23 (BG 23) was placed north of Ban Na as a protective shield. A Thai mercenary battalion, Bataillon Infanterie 15 (BI 15), was brought in to establish Fire Support Base Puncher; part of a Thai artillery unit was also inserted with them. To placate Neutralist Prime Minister Souvanna Phouma, Bataillon Infanterie 17 (BI 17) from Forces Armées Neutralistes was entrusted with occupation duty at Moung Soui. The guerrillas they replaced were slated for a southward operation.

Operation Counterpunch II began when BG 227 re-entered the operation in the first week of October, being helilifted to a mountaintop position 12 kilometers northeast of Moung Soui to start Counterpunch II. A battalion-sized Special Guerrilla Unit (SGU) was imported from Military Region 1 and added into the original Counterpunch effort. Meanwhile, BG 227 moved toward Moung Soui, only to be stopped by PAVN forces on 8 October. However, while the communists were blocking BG 227, other Royalist forces overran Moung Soui on 11 October.

On 17 October, Ban Na fell to the original Counterpunch Royalists. GM 22 captured Phou Seu, just off the western edge of the Plain, and began to patrol onto the Plain itself, into PAVN territory. However, the column slated to attack southward from Moung Soui remained in place. Then two events occurred on 1 November 1970. USAF tactical air sorties into MR 2 were curtailed, as increased air power was directed against the Ho Chi Minh Trail. And six PAVN companies took Phou Seu back from GM 22. GM 22 halted their patrolling and their advance.

== Operation Counterpunch III ==
On the night of 26 November, Vang Pao launched Counterpunch III (Lao name: Pasanmit, or 'Friendship'). A 40-man team of Commando Raiders made a daring aerial hop courtesy of 21st Special Operations Squadron all the way to Ban Ban in the rear of the PAVN aggressors, at the eastern terminus of the communist supply line into the Plain. On 27 November, Groupement Mobile 21 (GM 21) and Bataillon Guerrilla 224 (BG 224) landed on the field the Commando Raiders had cleared. Several older helicopters on the operation lacked the fuel to return to base until it was parachuted to them.

By 29 November, the Royalist force began moving north into the Ban Ban Valley. They moved tentatively against light resistance, worried that ground fog would frustrate air support. ADC militia from Bouamlong moved south to meet them, but stopped short in the mountains. Finally, on 25 December 1970, they struck enemy supplies—100 tons of rice, munitions, and four trucks. Without any raiding any further communist caches, GM 21 and BG 224 halted in place. Counterpunch was ended on 7 January 1971.

== Results ==
The American Embassy in Vientiane estimated that the pending North Vietnamese wet season offensive had been forestalled for a month. However, PAVN still outnumbered the Royalist guerrillas, and still held strongholds on high ground west of the Plain of Jars near Royalist guerrilla headquarters. This left PAVN forces entrenched only 20 miles from the guerrilla base at Long Tieng. Noting the urgency of the situation, the CIA Chief of Station noted the Hmong resistance had been worn thin by heavy casualties among its male members, the enervation of relocating the soldiers' dependents as refugees, and dwindling support from tactical air strikes. He requested an infusion of modern weaponry, such as M16 rifles, M60 machine guns, and Claymore mines. He also asked for an increase in airpower. His plaint reached the highest levels. President Richard M. Nixon stated he wanted northern Laos to remain in Royalist hands.
