= Campaign 139 =

- Part of Laotian Civil War, Arc Light, Vietnam War
Date	14 September 1969 – 25 April 1970
Location	Military Region 2, Laos; Dien Bien Phu, North Vietnam
Result	Victory for Kingdom of Laos

Belligerents
North Vietnam (Laos) Pathet Lao	Kingdom of Laos; Forces Armées Neutralistes; Thailand

Commanders and leaders
(North Vietnam) Võ Nguyên Giáp (North Vietnam) Vũ Lập	(Kingdom of Laos) Vang Pao (Kingdom of Laos) Kouprasith Abhay; Souvanna Phouma

Units involved
(North Vietnam) 312th Division (North Vietnam) 316th Division (North Vietnam) 866th Independent Regiment (North Vietnam) 10 Dac Cong battalions (North Vietnam) Artillery units (North Vietnam) Engineer units (North Vietnam) 60 PT-76 tanks (Laos) Ten battalions	(Kingdom of Laos) Battalion of Volunteers 24 (Kingdom of Laos) Battalion of Infantry 12 (Kingdom of Laos) Battalion of Volunteers 26 (Kingdom of Laos) Auto Defense Choc militia (Kingdom of Laos) Battalion of Infantry 21 (Kingdom of Laos) Battalion of Infantry 21 (Kingdom of Laos) Special Guerrilla Unit 1 (Kingdom of Laos) Special Guerrilla Unit 2 (Kingdom of Laos) Mobile Group 23 (Kingdom of Laos) Brown Battalion (Kingdom of Laos) Special Guerrilla Unit 4 (Kingdom of Laos) Forces Guerrilla Northwest (Kingdom of Laos) RLAF T-28 Trojans (Kingdom of Laos) Thai mercenary pilots Neutralist forces (Thailand) Special Requirement 9 (United States) 3 AC-47 Spookys (United States) USAF air support (United States) 1 BLU-82 (United States) Air America C-130s (United States) B-52 Stratofortresses

Strength
Over 16,000 North Vietnamese; About 1,500 Pathet Lao	5,000–6,000

Casualties and losses
Heavy	Heavy

Campaign 139 (Vietnamese: Chiến dịch 139) was a major military offensive of the People's Army of Vietnam, launched against its Royalist enemies during the Laotian Civil War. Larger than previous invading forces, Campaign 139 was also a combined arms expedition containing tanks, artillery, engineers, and Dac Cong sappers. As such, it was a decided escalation in the war. It was also an exceptional rainy season offensive by PAVN, which usually withdrew during the wet season.

Launched on 14 September 1969 with 60 tanks, 26 PAVN and 10 Pathet Lao battalions, plus supporting units, Campaign 139 drove from the Lao/DRV border into the strategic Plain of Jars in Military Region 2 of the Kingdom of Laos. The 16,000 plus invaders were opposed by a force of Central Intelligence Agency (CIA) sponsored hill tribes guerrillas some 5,500 to 6,000 strong. Hmong general Vang Pao's L'Armee Clandestine had just overrun the Plain during Kou Kiet, and the general elected to hold on. However, despite the best efforts of the guerrillas in a series of defensive clashes on and around the Plain, backed by massive air power, on 11 February 1970 the communists forced entrance to the Plain by capturing the crucial intersection of Routes 7/74. Having forced their way onto the Plain, the communists pushed their way across it to besiege the crucial main guerrilla base at Long Tieng. They overran the nearby refugee center at Sam Thong on 18 March 1970, and temporarily occupied the high ground overlooking the Lima Site 20A airstrip at Long Tieng used for resupplying the guerrillas. United States support of the irregulars was escalated, with the first B-52 Stratofortress Arc Light in northern Laos on 17 February, and the first ever use of the BLU-82 super-bomb on 22 March. On 18 March, irregular reinforcements were flown in from other military regions of Laos; so was a Royal Thai artillery battalion of mercenaries. Though the newly arrived guerrilla units were generally poor quality, they sufficed to fend off the exhausted PAVN. By 25 April 1970, the communists had fallen back onto their home ground near Dien Bien Phu, North Vietnam.

During the fighting, political negotiation between the Royal Lao Government and the Pathet Lao allies of the Vietnamese were attempted, to form a ceasefire agreement. Prime Minister Souvanna Phouma took advantage of his standing as a Neutralist to let it be privately known that Laos was willing to cease operations against the Ho Chi Minh Trail in southern Laos if the fighting was halted on the Plain. Hmong General Vang Pao quietly explored the option of moving his tribesmen and their guerrillas from the battlefield south to the Thai/Lao border. Campaign 139 ended with the Royalists scarcely able to defend the kingdom, which faced imminent defeat.

== Overview ==
After World War II, France fought the First Indochina War to retain French Indochina. When it lost that war at Dien Ben Phu, it freed the Kingdom of Laos. Laotian neutrality was established in the 1954 Geneva Agreements. When France withdrew most of its military in conformity with the treaty, the United States filled the vacuum with purportedly civilian paramilitary instructors. A North Vietnamese-backed communist insurrection began as early as 1949. Invading during the opium harvest season of 1953, it settled in northeastern Laos adjacent to the border of the Democratic Republic of Vietnam.

As the Laotian Civil War flared, it became apparent that the People's Army of Vietnam would be opposed by Lao guerrilla forces backed by air power. The Central Intelligence Agency established a secret guerrilla army in the Plain of Jars. Interposed between the communist settlement around Xam Neua and the Royal Lao Government in Vientiane, the Hmong military irregulars fought to hold on to their traditional territory, and to preserve Laos. After the failure and defeat of Operation Pigfat and Operation Raindance in early 1969, the communists had overrun the Plain of Jars to within ten kilometers of the guerrillas' main base at Long Chieng in Military Region 2. As a riposte, Hmong General Vang Pao had launched another spoiling offensive against the pressing communists with Kou Kiet. However, the communists fought back with their own campaign. Vang Pao had countered again, with Operation Off Balance.

== Campaign 139 (1969-1970) ==
Campaign 139 was named by the Vietnamese communist military convention of encoding the founding date in an operational code name; in its case, the 13th day of the 9th month. On 13 September 1969, the Democratic Republic of Vietnam's General Võ Nguyên Giáp tasked General Vũ Lập with command of Campaign 139, to be waged in Military Region 2 of Laos. Included in the orders were ten Pathet Lao battalions for service; however, those battalions mustered only about 150 men each. Given their propensity for flight rather than fight, they were of dubious military value to Vũ Lập. The major forces in Campaign 139 would be the first PAVN combined arms team to invade northern Laos. Already in place in MR 2 awaiting Vũ Lập's leadership were 26 People's Army of Vietnam (PAVN) battalions and 60 tanks.

== Campaign 139 ==
=== Phase one: the campaign begins ===
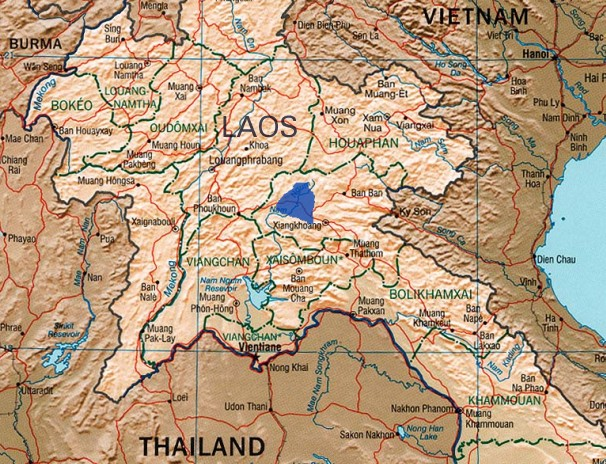
The Plain of Jars, scene of Campaign 139, is marked by the blue shading.

Campaign 139 kicked off the day after Vũ Lập received his orders. An advance party from the 141st Regiment of the 312th Division formed near Nong Het. Attacks upon Royalist irregulars at Phou Nok Kok followed, a fortnight later. On 25 October 1969, the communists committed a larger force for continuing the attack—the remainder of the 312th Division, the 316th Division, and the 866th Independent Regiment. Support units for these attacking forces came from four Dac Cong battalions, plus assorted artillery, engineer, and tank units. The 316th was directed to lead the support units down Route 7; the 312th Division and the 866th Independent Regiment were tasked for attack down Route 72. Within a week, the latter twice probed the Royalist positions at Phou Nok Kok, then continued to pressure them.

On 6 November 1969, Vang Pao called a strategy session to revamp the Royalist irregulars' defenses. The success of his just concluded Kou Kiet had left him in possession of the strategic Plain of Jars, but with only 5,500 to 6,000 war-weary irregular troops to hold it. His Central Intelligence Agency advisers estimated he faced 16,000 North Vietnamese regulars, plus the Pathet Lao battalions. At such odds, they believed he had to go on the defensive. They had planned four successive lines of hilltop strongholds, with the idea that tactical air could destroy communists attacking the Royalist trenchworks. Even within each defensive line, the hilltop forts were not mutually reinforcing one another but were easily bypassed. Vang Pao was more realistic than his advisers; he still realized that guerrillas needed the tactical flexibility to fight or flee as circumstances demanded.

At the strategy meeting, he asked his CIA advisers for an extensive list of weaponry, and received more M16 rifles, and both 105mm and 155mm howitzers. He then outlined his plan to place blocking forces at both Xieng Khouangville and the intersection of Routes 7 and 71, with a reserve held at Lima Site 22. The latter was one of the few installations in Laos that had been developed into some approximation of a typical American fire support base in South Vietnam.

However, before these moves could be completed, the 165th Regiment of the PAVN 312th Division struck Xieng Khouangville on 9 November. The Royalist Bataillon Volantaire 24 (Battalion of Volunteers 24; abbreviated BV 24) repelled the assault. Upon a repeated attack on 17 November, BV 24 retreated. On the 23rd, Bataillon Infanterie 12 (Battalion of Infantry/BI 12) was returned home from Military Region 2 to Military Region 5.

Faced with these reverses, Vang Pao recalled Bataillon Volontaire 26 (BV 26) from its far northern outpost in Xam Neua, Houaphanh Province. Manning newly supplied 155 mm howitzers, and reinforced by PT-76 amphibious tanks captured from the communists, BV 26 retook Xieng Khouangville on 27 November 1969. While ordering this resistance, Vang Pao also stealthily contacted the Pathet Lao because he was anxious to preserve the Hmong people. He proposed that the communists grant autonomy to Xieng Khouang Province as a Hmong polity; in turn, the Hmong guerrillas would withdraw from the war. As an alternative move to preserve the Hmong, he also harbored the idea that the Hmong might withdraw to Sainyabuli Province near the Thai/Lao border.

Meanwhile, to the north of them, the communists probed Phou Nok Kok and Phou Pheung. The latter position was defended by a mix of Auto Defense Choc (ADC) militia and Bataillon Volontaire 21 (BV 21), but had been weakened by the departure of BI 12. A battalion from the PAVN 141st Regiment cleared the Royalist garrison from the stronghold on 29 November; the monarchists retreated southward.

Also in late November, the Royalist battalion on Phou Nok Kok was relieved by a fresh unit. On 2 December, Dac Cong sappers bombarded the position with about 300 rounds of mortar fire, followed by a night assault using improvised Bangalore torpedoes. As the Royalists began to retreat at dawn, CIA case agent Wilbur "Will" Green, call sign "Black Lion", began calling in close air support, including 2,000 pound bombs. The strikes drove the communist sappers off the mountaintop.

A lull in communist activity followed, during which a melange of Royalist units launched a counterattack on 4 December. Hmong guerrillas manned PT-76 tanks captured from the communists, as well as 155 mm howitzers. They supported Bataillon Infanterie 19 (BI 19), as well as BV 21 and ADC militia. After recapturing Phou Pheung, they continued eastward to seize the Routes 71 and 74 junction.

By 12 December 1969, the guerrillas' CIA supporters realized that another PAVN drive was likely. They devised a plan for a strategic withdrawal in five phases in the face of overwhelming communist forces. However, guerrilla general Vang Pao turned down the withdrawal plan; he wanted to hold the Plain of Jars his forces had captured. He did pull in the ADC militia and their dependents from the last advanced guerrilla outpost at Houei Tong Ko near the Pathet Lao headquarters at Xam Neua.

=== Phase one: the forces engage ===
From 4–15 January 1970, 8,115 Hmong civilians were airlifted out from Xam Neua to resettle near Long Tieng. Meanwhile, the PAVN engaged several guerrilla positions simultaneously on the Plain of Jars. On 9 January, sappers of the 27th Dac Cong Battalion thrust at Phou Nok Kok from two directions while foul weather precluded tactical air strike support of the Royalists. Special Guerrilla Unit 1, (SGU 1), a battalion newly arrived from Military Region 4, initially held their ground despite their unfamiliarity with the position and its surrounding terrain. However, on 10 January, the sappers managed to scale the sheer northern face of the mountain, gaining the summit. With their advantage of height, the attacking sappers poured mortar and flamethrower fire upon the Royalists. Late on 12 January, GM 23 withdrew. On 15 January, 183 Royalist soldiers from BV 26 were landed on a ridge directly across Route 7 from Phou Nok Kok in an abortive effort to retake it. Bad flying weather prevented air support of their understrength counter, which petered out within a day.

At another location, Royalist Groupement Mobile 23 (GM 23) irregular regiment had occupied a hilltop overlooking Route 72. From 13–22 January, heavy weapons of the 312th PAVN Division shelled GM 23. The Royalist irregulars retreated and exfiltrated, opening the way for two PAVN combat engineer regiments to move in and begin improving Route 72 for an advance on Xieng Khouangville.

With counterattack not an immediate option, the Royalists clung to the chokepoint at the junction of Routes 7 and 71. They garrisoned it with four battalions, plus some ADC militia. On 22 January, those Royalist forces were reinforced by two battalions. On the 23rd, American ambassador G. McMurtrie Godley requested supporting Arc Light strikes by B-52 Stratofortresses to bomb an opposing enemy concentration along Route 7. On 30 January, a makeshift armored column from Lima 22 managed to reach the 7/71 intersection with supplies.

In early February, Royal Lao Air Force (RLAF) T-28 Trojans, pilots, and maintenance personnel from the other four Military Regions of Laos transferred into the forward fighter base at Muang Soui to help counter Campaign 139. Anticipating imminent attack, aerial evacuation of civilians under Royalist control on the Plain began on 4 February 1970. Using C-130 transports loaned to them by the U. S. Air Force, Air America removed over 16,700 Lao refugees over the following six days. Meanwhile, Vang Pao decided to use his guerrilla army's air superiority to hopscotch over the opposing communist forces and occupy a mountain top behind them. By 7 February, a 155 mm howitzer and Royalists from BV 26 occupied a 1,394 meter peak in the rear of the communists, overlooking the 7/71 junction and capable of interdicting PAVN lines of communication by fire.

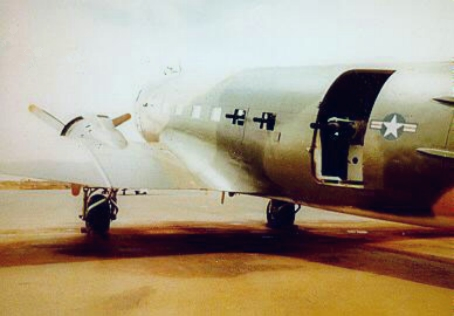
The AC-47 was capable of firing 6,000 rounds per minute from each of its three guns. The guns can be seen here in the cargo door and two windows ahead of it.

On 11 February, the communists attacked in two locations. Two companies of Dac Cong attacked LS 22 that evening, but were repelled by the close air support of three AC-47 gunships; 76 dead communists were found in LS 22's defensive wire. LS 22 held. That same day, intruding communists from two sapper battalions threw tear gas into the defenders' trenches at the Routes 7/71 intersection. That sufficed to cause one Royalist irregular unit, Brown Battalion, to withdraw toward LS 22 after desultory resistance. The other monarchist battalions soon followed. The following day, the 148th and 174th PAVN Regiments infiltrated under cover of a fog bank to overrun the 7/71 road fork and captured the 155 mm howitzer abandoned there. The communists now held the entry portal to the Plain, and were free to begin phase two of Campaign 139. The communists spent the next four days reorganizing while Vang Pao rallied his fleeing troops into defensive positions centered on LS 22.

=== Phase two: the assaults ===
The night of 17 February 1970 was eventful. At LS 22, four PT-76s attacked under cover of fog, only to be destroyed by defensive anti-tank mines. Coinciding with this, a Dac Cong squad had penetrated the security of the guerrilla headquarters in the rear area of Lima Strip 20 Alternate (LS 20A). Three of them were killed in the attempt, but two RLAF T-28s and an O-1 Bird Dog were damaged. Most importantly, the U.S. escalated the war in northern Laos with its first B-52 Arc Light strike. Approved personally by President Richard M. Nixon, the three plane strike was aimed at a suspected North Vietnamese headquarters at the eastern limits of the Plain of Jars. It would be followed by others during the campaign.

On 20 February, PAVN 122 mm rockets hit LS 22, cancelling a visit by King Sisavang Vatthana. The communist assault that night was repulsed by the RLG's Neutralist allies, Forces Armées Neutralistes (FAN). A second attack, just before dawn of the 21st, saw four communist tanks roll up to the FAN trenchwork. The Neutralists retreated to the southwest, with the remainder of the 1,300 defenders, including Brown Battalion, in trail. By 1415 hours, LS 22 was largely deserted. Air strikes were called in to destroy abandoned Royalist equipment, including five captured communist tanks, 12 recoilless rifles, two 105 mm howitzers, and seven trucks. That same day, three other Royalist positions fell to the communists. On 22 February, the Royalists left Xieng Khouangville to the communist 165th Regiment. The Royalist Special Guerrilla Unit 2 moved 18 kilometers southwest under air cover and set up a defensive position blocking a southern exit from the Plain. When the panic-stricken Brown Battalion fled through Muang Soui, the Royalists joined them and deserted the vital airstrip. Meanwhile, far in the communist rear area, a CIA-backed commando raid dreamt up by Henry Kissinger and approved by President Nixon burned several North Vietnamese offices and warehouses in the communist rear area at Dien Bien Phu, North Vietnam to little effect.

Although their logistical system was stretched to its limit, the PAVN continued their advance on the Plain along several vectors in early March. On one axis, both the 866th Independent and 165th Regiments bypassed Xieng Khouangville to attack the Royalist Special Guerrilla Unit 4 stronghold at Khang Kho. The defensive minefields there stymied the communist attack. The PAVN regiments then penetrated further into Royalist territory, fetching up one ridgeline short of the main guerrilla base at Lima Site 20 Alternate. A second advance by elements of the PAVN 174th Regiment split in two to besiege two Royalist guerrilla positions. A third push by the PAVN 148th Regiment established it on the mountain peak of Phou Long Mat near the Royalist rear base at Sam Thong. The Royalist irregular force headquarters were now menaced by the communist advance, and Vang Pao's L'Armee Clandestine was threatened with extinction.

On 6 March 1970, the Pathet Lao took advantage of the battlefield situation—which included the onset of nonflying weather—to offer the Royal Lao Government (RLG) a five-point peace plan to settle the war to their satisfaction. That same day, on the far side of the world, President Nixon misinformed the American public by denying that any Americans had been killed in Laos. The next day, the RLG publicly countered the Pathet Lao with their own public three point proposal based on PAVN withdrawal from Laos. Prime Minister Souvanna Phouma, who was a Neutralist, used private channels to let it be known the RLG would halt their military operations against the Ho Chi Minh Trail if the communists agreed to a ceasefire in northern Laos. However, no ceasefire eventuated.

=== Phase two: Long Tieng besieged ===
On 13 March 1970, contingency planning began for evacuation of noncombat personnel from Long Tieng and Sam Thong, as Vang Pao again mulled moving his Hmong community toward the Thai border. Renewed PAVN attacks on 15 March on several Royalist positions in MR 2 began before the evacuation could start. A company of PAVN troops hit the perimeter of the refugee relief center at Sam Thong. On 17 March, emergency evacuation of Royalist wounded, Laotian civilians, and Americans from Sam Thong began despite continuing wretched flying weather. The next day, the last Hmong irregulars abandoned Sam Thong to the communists, who promptly torched half of it. As the retreating Hmong gathered at Long Tieng, PAVN infantry roved the ridgeline above it five kilometers to the northeast. By now, three-fourths of Long Tieng's populace—the noncombatant portion—was being evacuated via air. The CIA case agents on site destroyed their classified material. Vang Pao's reserves were reduced to two companies of recruits pulled from basic training, his military band, and 28 aviation technicians. However the 20A airfield remained open as Vang Pao personally defended it with a mortar.

Later on 18 March, reinforcements began to land on the field. As the weather broke, a Royal Thai Artillery battalion of 300 trained regulars, Special Requirement 9 (SR 9), flew in to set up their guns on high ground southwest of the strip, near Sisavang Vatthana's villa. Advance contingents of two guerrilla battalions from Military Region 3 arrived, amounting to over 500 men. So did the lead party of 79 for a Forces Guerrilla Northwest battalion from MR 1 and a cargo plane of troops from MR 4. Aerial reinforcement from these sources continued on 20 March. Special Guerrilla Unit 2 filtered in from Khang Kho and mustered for duty on Skyline Ridge. A scattering of other stragglers also reported in. There were about 2,000 disorganized irregulars to defend Long Tieng against an estimated 5,000 to 6,000 PAVN regulars.

The General Staff had reinforced the Route 7/13 intersection to the rear of the battle with four battalions under General Kouprasith Abhay in mid-March, to block the route to the Royalist capital at Vientiane in case of defeat in MR 2. Now they sent a fleeting delegation of four generals to 20A, who made a useless recommendation to supply more uniforms to the guerrillas. Otherwise, the irregulars were on their own in the battle against the invaders. And while the guerrilla base at Long Tieng still held, outlying Royalist positions continued to fall to the communists. One of the fallen positions was Skyline One, which overlooked the 20A airfield. A PAVN artillery direction team was spotted three kilometers from the guerrilla base. That evening, Long Tieng came under communist fire for the first time, as communist 122 mm rockets dropped in and a small band of Dac Cong attempted to raid the airstrip.

By mid-morning 21 March 1970, the communists had been pushed back out of Skyline One. RLAF Thai mercenary pilots also attacked, using the Lima strip at Moung Kassy as an improvised forward base as it was nearest to the Plain except Muang Soui. With cloud cover clearing, RLAF T-28s were flown in to begin operations from 20A. With Vang Pao helping to arm the aircraft, two Hmong pilots began bombing Sam Thong. One of the Hmong pilots flew 31 sorties in a day. Twelve more RLAF T-28 strikes were flown by American pilots from Project Waterpump.

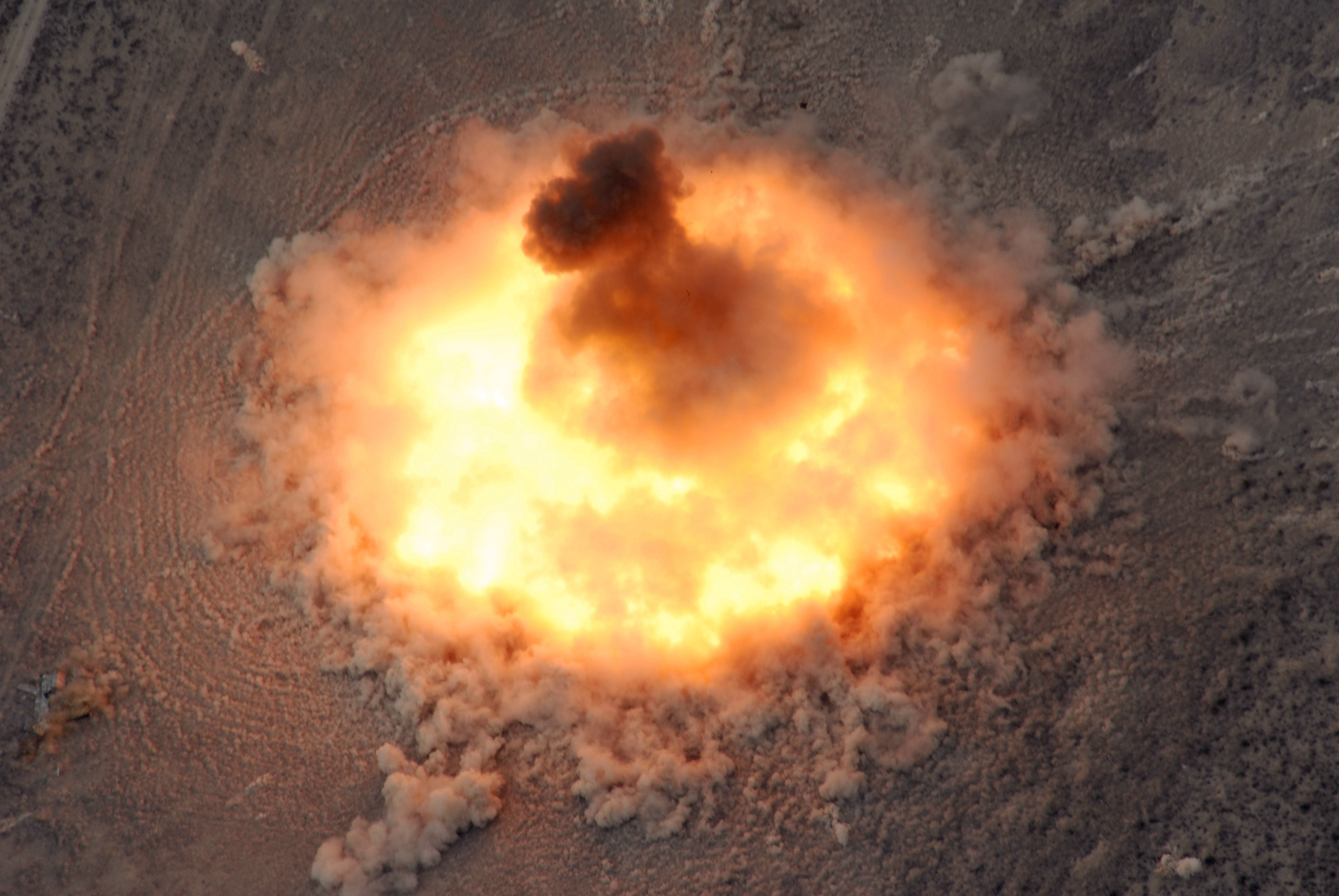
A typical explosion of a BLU-82. Its radius of effect is several hundred meters. Its first usage anywhere occurred on 22 March 1970, in an attempt to blunt Campaign 139.

On 22 March, stragglers from the Ban Na outpost began to regroup on Skyline Ridge as 122 mm rockets continued to bombard Long Tieng. Elsewhere in MR 2, Royal Lao Army (RLA) and FAN troops left their positions to the communists. That night, the U.S. Air Force dropped a 15,000 pound BLU-82 for the first time. Communist troops caught within several hundred meters of the impact were put out of action, breaking the communist attack. Vang Pao was in Vientiane to beg reinforcements from the General Staff to stave off defeat, but the generals were absorbed in drill practice for the upcoming Army Day celebration.

On 23 March, clear weather allowed the U.S. Air Force to begin striking the communists with about 185 sorties per day for a four-day period.

At 0100 on 24 March, Dac Cong managed to disable the TACAN beacon at Skyline One; the TACAN was crucial for directing U.S. Air Force air strikes. To retake it, the makeshift guerrilla battalion from MR 1 was enticed by $1 per day combat pay to reclaim Skyline Ridge. Given gunship support and issued new M16 rifles, the guerrillas stormed the hill. Vang Pao ordered their continued advance northward toward Sam Thong. By 26 March, having advanced with steadily increasing tactical air support as weather cleared, they were perched on hilltops south of Sam Thong. Unknown to them, the communist defenders scattered from Sam Thong into the nearby jungle. CIA case agent Tony Poe, who had scraped together the various smaller units he had amalgamated into an ad hoc MR 1 battalion to be shipped to MR 2, had followed them into action. He flew into Sam Thong on 27 March and contacted his troops. They came down from the hills, and by 1500 hours on 27 March 1970, Sam Thong was reoccupied by Royalists.

Perceiving no further communist threat, Hmong refugees began to return to Long Tieng and Sam Thong. However, there remained a pocket of PAVN resistance southwest of 20A. The 866th Independent Regiment held two mountaintop positions within artillery range of 20A, and a detachment of the 148th Regiment held another. On 29 March, the Royalists moved to capture these strongholds. The two battalions imported from MR 3 had completed their ranks; they now moved north from Long Tieng and swept the communists from the top of Phou Phasai. A 155 mm howitzer was helilifted in for artillery support. On 3 April, CIA case agent Will Greene promised his 3 Special Guerrilla Battalion $3 per day combat pay for moving into the attack. Backed by a RLA battalion cobbled together from other battalion's units, the guerrillas captured the last of the threatening hilltop positions by April's end. However, by then Vũ Lập had recalled the majority of his forces from the Plain and Campaign 139 had been officially ended by the communists on 25 April 1970.

== Results ==
Although PAVN had failed in its effort to eliminate the Royalist guerrilla army from Military Region 2, it had left the RLG irregulars in sad shape. Previous defeats had left them demoralized, and now they had almost been wiped out. The CIA's paramilitary training efforts had always had difficulty in forming and using units unless the recruits shared a common ethnicity. Hmong General Vang Pao's command of his irregular army depended on his shared ethnicity with them. The wake of Campaign 139 now found him trying to command large numbers of non-Hmong troops. Worse yet, some of the ad hoc units hastily formed for defending MR 2 consisted of mixed ethnicities, with inevitable inter-group tensions. Nor was Vang Pao's problem eased by weak, corrupt, and incompetent leadership by his subordinate battalion commanders. Their units were perpetually understrength. "Ghost soldiers"—non-existent or departed soldiers whose salaries were pocketed by their commanders—might show on the unit's rolls, but obviously were not available for combat. They were still counted against unit strength, though. Under these conditions, Royalist combat refusals began to occur, not just in MR 2, but also among Special Guerrilla Units facing the Ho Chi Minh Trail, as the monarchists sometimes refused to take the offensive when ordered.

Despite 14 years of training and support, the Royal Lao Army was still largely a noncombatant. L'Clandestine Armee was the only Royalist fighting force left, and its near defeat was the near loss of the war.
