= Kou Kiet =

- Part of Laotian Civil War, Vietnam War
Date	6 August 1969 – 30 September 1969
Location	Northeastern and central Laos
Result	Kingdom of Laos Victory; Supplies from the People's Army of Vietnam; Forces of the Royal Lao army severely weakened
Territorial changes	Kingdom of Laos gains control of the Plain of Jars

Belligerents
Kingdom of Laos	North Vietnam (Laos) Pathet Lao

Commanders and leaders
(Kingdom of Laos) Vang Pao	Unknown

Units involved
(Kingdom of Laos) Blue Battalion (Kingdom of Laos) Auto Defense Choc militia (Kingdom of Laos) Special Guerrilla Unit 2 (Kingdom of Laos) Volunteer Battalion 27 (Kingdom of Laos) Volunteer Battalion 21 (Kingdom of Laos) Volunteer Battalion 24 (Kingdom of Laos) 101st Paratroop Battalion (Kingdom of Laos) Mobile Group 22 (Kingdom of Laos) Mobile Group 23 (Kingdom of Laos) Less than 30 T-28s (United States) Raven Forward Air Controllers	(North Vietnam) Infantry (North Vietnam) PT-76s (Laos) Infantry battalions

Kou Kiet (translation: Redeem Honor; also called Operation About Face) was a major Laotian Civil War victory for the anti-communist troops of the Kingdom of Laos. Patterned after prior Operation Raindance, it depended upon extensive air strikes blasting communist units and clearing them from the path of the Royalist offensive. Powered by 150 daylight and 50 night sorties daily, with 50 to 80 day strikes directed by Raven Forward Air Controllers, Kou Kiet ran from 6 August to 30 September 1969. It was successful beyond expectations. After the Royal Lao Government troops achieved their objectives, General Vang Pao insisted on pushing forward while they had the initiative. As a result, the Royalists regained control of the entire Plain of Jars while also capturing a huge stock of munitions from the communist forces. Their triumph came at a huge cost. Even though the Royalists were successful, by battle's end their forces were exhausted and the pool of potential recruits were limited, while the Vietnamese could easily replace their personnel losses.

== Overview ==
After World War II, France fought the First Indochina War to retain French Indochina. As part of its loss of that war at Dien Ben Phu, it freed the Kingdom of Laos. Laotian neutrality was established in the 1954 Geneva Agreements. When France withdrew most of its military in conformity with the treaty, the United States filled the vacuum with purportedly civilian paramilitary instructors. A North Vietnamese-backed communist insurrection began as early as 1949. Invading during the opium harvest season of 1953, it settled in northeastern Laos adjacent to the border of the Democratic Republic of Vietnam.

As the Laotian Civil War flared, the Central Intelligence Agency established a secret guerrilla army in the Plain of Jars. Interposed between the communist settlement around Xam Neua and the Royal Lao Government in Vientiane, the Hmong military irregulars fought to hold on to their traditional territory, and to preserve Laos. After the failure and defeat of Operation Pigfat and Operation Raindance in early 1969, the communists had overrun the Plain of Jars to within ten kilometers of the guerrillas' main base at Long Chieng. As a riposte, Hmong General Vang Pao plotted another spoiling offensive against the pressing communists. However, the People's Army of Vietnam (PAVN) beat him to it with Campaign Thoan Thang. After the Vietnamese campaign ran its course, Vang Pao launched yet another inconclusive offensive that failed to clear the foe from the Plain of Jars, Operation Off Balance. By 28 June 1969, the PAVN had 60 tanks deployed. Additionally, there were seven new Vietnamese infantry battalions poised on the Plain, while the Royalist remained unreinforced. The PAVN now had a total of 26 battalions in the Plain of Jars area, seemingly poised for a further wet season offensive.

== Kou Kiet ==
=== Preliminaries ===
The monsoon rains that had crippled the air support for Operation Off Balance, and Operation Pigfat before that, now began to clear to favor Vang Pao and his forces. With about triple the usual rainfall for the month of July, communist ground logistics began to bog down, often quite literally. Conversely, Vang Pao's troops were being amply supplied via air bridge; brand new M16 rifles were being secretively provided for his troops.

Also, U.S. Air Force tactical air strikes with area denial munitions forced the PAVN supply efforts off the main road. However, to the opposing Royalist forces, the PAVN still remained a threatening force in being to the ancestral Hmong territory south of the Plain of Jars. In late July 1969, as Off Balance was still being fought, Vang Pao plotted a diversionary attack against the PAVN's main supply road, Route 7. Suspicious of leaky security among the Royal Lao Army command, Vang Pao demanded CIA-supported guerrillas for his next offensive. His insistence was problematic, as he lacked the needed manpower in his own CIA guerrilla army. In an unprecedented move, guerrillas were transferred in from other Military Regions.

The Hmong general called the new offensive operation Kou Kiet (Redeemed Honor). His CIA contacts dubbed it Operation About Face when they approved it. No matter the name, it was patterned on the previous Operation Raindance, planned as a three-week attack with the major firepower being tactical air. Newly arrived Ambassador G. McMurtrie Godley messaged his superiors in the U.S. State Department that the military situation on the Plain of Jars was so crucial that if fighter-bombers would not suffice for Kou Kiet, Arc Light strikes by B-52s should be considered as a followup.

It was planned as a two phase operation. The first phase was a helilift of two battalions to a ridgeline overlooking Nong Pet, which oversaw Route 70. From there, both the Royalist battalion of regulars and the Hmong Special Guerrilla Unit would attack and block Route 7. The second phase would involve three battalions of Royal Lao Army and five battalions of irregulars. They were to be helicoptered in to take up positions on two mountains that overlooked the southern Plain of Jars. This latter movement seemed beyond Royalist capabilities; both his CIA advisors and Prime Minister Souvanna Phouma cautioned him about it. However, the Hmong general pressed forward with his plans, even persuading both Military Region 3 and Military Region 4 to loan him a guerrilla battalion each. Kou Kiet was due to launch on 3 August. Although the PAVN outnumbered the Hmong and had superior fighting power, it was believed that air power during favorable weather conditions would tip the balance to the Royalists. Planning 150 tactical air strikes during daylight, and 50 strikes per night, the U.S. Air Force could count on Raven FACs to spot for and direct 50 to 80 sorties per day close air support for the Royalist guerrillas.

=== Phase one ===
After a hold because of bad weather, the offensive kicked off during a heavy rain on 6 August 1969. With the new troops available from other Military Regions, the operational planning had shifted to a pincer movement for phase one. Blue Battalion from Military Region 3 was helicoptered into Bouamlong, north of Route 7, to be joined by local Auto Defense Choc militia. They were to march south toward the Nong Pet road junction. The other pincer was landed by short takeoff and landing aircraft at San Tiau, southeast of Route 7. This makeshift force was made up of Military Region 4's battalion-sized 2nd Special Guerrilla Unit, Military Region 2's Bataillon Volontaires 27 (Volunteer Battalion 27), plus some ADC guerrillas. Despite the weather hold, the attack began in heavy rain.

As a result, the northern contingent was bogged down for about a week before helicopters could move them to Nong Pet. At about the same date, on 19 August, the southern pincer took the ridge overseeing Nong Pet that was their objective. Four days later, the northern task force had moved within eight kilometers of Nong Pet.

The People's Army of Vietnam had offered no organized resistance to the Royalist incursion. Road watch teams, plus implanted spy sensors, both reported that no trucks bearing supplies for the communists had made it down Route 7 onto the Plain of Jars since the attacks began. Encouraged by his success, and by the lack of opposition, Vang Pao launched Phase two of his plan.

=== Phase two ===
Building on success, on 20 August Vang Pao expanded his offensive. He continued to plan on a two-pronged operation. As before, there was a northern column. Two battalions of Royalist regular volunteers—Bataillon Volontaires 21 and Bataillon Volontaires 24—were stiffened with the 101 Bataillon Parachutistes (101st Paratroop Battalion). This probe moved northeastward from Ban Na; their immediate objective was Moung Phanh. The second column, moving in from the south, consisted of two regimental-size units of guerrillas, Groupe Mobile 22 and Groupe Mobile 23. Most of the Kou Kiet troops were armed with M16s.

GM 22 and GM 23 marched northward without opposition through the marshy southern edge of the Plain of Jars for five days, GM 22 leading, GM 23 trailing. Then GM 22 split in two; part of the unit swerved eastward on its own axis of advance. The two prongs of GM 22 would reunite at the Lat Houang junction of Routes 4 and 5 by the end of August. There they found a feast of abandoned livestock. On 31 August, the U.S. Air Force began five days of spraying defoliant on communist-held rice paddies on the plain. The ongoing success of the campaign was credited to air power. Besides the heavy daily contribution of 140 sorties per day of the U.S. Air Force, fewer than 30 Royal Lao Air Force AT-28s flew over 90 sorties per day of close air support.

By 1 September, there had been no real opposition from the foe. Of the 18 communist battalions that had been occupying the Plain of Jars, only two weren't Pathet Lao. A Vietnamese prisoner of war revealed that the communists planned no new offensive until arrival of the dry season. On 4 September, a captured PAVN officer described his 400-man unit and six tanks as being trapped when they attempted withdrawal back along Route 7 to North Vietnam. Most unusually for the highly disciplined PAVN, the unit broke, scattered, and fled. At about this time, Vang Pao realized he could extend his offensive still further.

=== Phase two, part two ===
By 5 September, the Hmong irregulars moved north onto the Plain of Jars, overrunning huge hoards of military materiel, including a fleet of PT-76 tanks. Continuing onwards, still uncontested, on 9 September GM 22 captured Khang Khay. Even as they were doing so, GM 23 swung into action. Two of its battalions captured Phou Khe and Phonsavan on 12 September; the third relieved GM 22 at Khang Khay. GM 22 advanced one kilometer northwest to occupy a cavern containing a Pathet Lao radio station, and other materiel.

Vang Pao brought more fresh troops to his campaign, a mixture of Royalist regulars and Hmong irregulars. On 18 September, Bataillon Volontaires 21 and a force of the hill tribe guerrillas captured Phou San and nearby foothills. Here, for the first time, the RLG troops met resistance. After the communists managed to block the Royalist advance for two days. the latter were reinforced by a regiment, Groupe Mobile 21. GM 21 was tasked with seizing the high ground at Phou Keng in a night assault. They took it on 24 September, granting them surveillance of the northern end of the Plain of Jars.

With the Plain of Jars largely under RLG control, a scratch force of seven Auto Defense Choc militia companies closed in on the PAVN troops stranded in Muang Soui. On the last day of September, two ADC companies occupied Muang Soui as the battered, starving Vietnamese faded into the jungle. Despite extensive bombing by the U.S. Air Force, most equipment there was undamaged, and untouched by the PAVN.

At this point, it became apparent that communist resistance was forming. There were still three intact PAVN regiments in the vicinity; military intelligence reports heralded the arrival of the PAVN 312th Division from Vietnam. A PAVN counterattack on an SGU fixed position at Phou Nok Kok showed that the Vietnamese were willing to take heavy casualties to attrite the dwindling guerrilla forces.

== Results of the operation ==
During this operation, Vang Pao and his Hmong army became dependent on close air support to the point they were considered to be the first guerrillas in history to project air superiority. That dependence began to erode their fighting abilities.

By the time Kou Kiet ended on 30 September 1969, tactical air was credited with hitting 308 communist vehicles. The PAVN had fled, abandoning the Pathet Lao and their weak allies in the Forces Armées Neutralistes. The Pathet Lao dispersed into the countryside, while the Neutralists refused combat and hastily retreated eastward to the border with the Democratic Republic of Vietnam. One of the caches captured by the advancing Hmong contained 100 tons of munitions; another held 22 trucks. Falling into the conquerors' hands by the end of October were 25 tanks, 113 vehicles with over 800,000 liters of fuel, more than 6,400 weapons, almost six million rounds of ammunition, and five days rations for the entire PAVN force. In terms of materiel captured, Kou Kiet was the greatest haul yet in the Second Indochina War. The loss jarred the PAVN into changing their previous tactics of stockpiling supplies close to their front line troops before an offensive.

Now, with the width of the plain separating the communists from the main guerrilla bases, the latter were no longer besieged. In addition to the tremendous stores of military materiel captured by the RLG, 20,000 inhabitants of the Plain were removed, depriving the communists of porters to move their supplies. The Plain of Jars was now clearly under RLG control for the first time in almost a year. However, the Hmong guerrilla attack suffered from success; the irregulars had outrun the planned limits of the campaign and pushed into an area designated for area denial ordnance. As a result, U.S. Air Force pilots could not drop mines to seal off the Vietnamese incursions due to the presence of friendly troops.

== Aftermath ==
Even as Kou Kiet was grinding to its finish, General Võ Nguyên Giáp issued orders on 13 September for an upcoming PAVN dry season attack in Military Region 2, dubbed Campaign 139. A preliminary battalion-sized retaliatory probe on 29 November pushed Bataillon Volontaires 21 and its Hmong auxiliaries off their mountaintop strongpoint. The Hmong, who were transitioning from classic guerrillas to light infantry, suffered irreplaceable increased casualties as a result. General Vang Pao's forces had dwindled to about 5,000 to 5,500 effectives. The Pathet Lao outnumbered them, with about 6,000 under arms. PAVN, on the other hand, could muster 16,000 troops. Moreover, while the Vietnamese replenished their losses, the Hmong were hard pressed to find recruits to replace their casualties.

Refugee relief worker Pop Buell left an account of recruiting Hmong replacements:

...we rounded up three hundred fresh recruits. Thirty percent were fourteen years old or less, and ten of them were only ten years old. Another thirty percent were fifteen or sixteen. The remaining forty percent were forty-five or over. Where were the ones in between? I'll tell you—they're all dead.

The Pathet Lao communists held rural territory largely barren of population for replacements; their forces had dwindled to battalions of about 150 men. By comparison, the Vietnamese could hypothetically replace 10,000 casualties per year for the next 14 years in the northern Laotian fighting, while Laotian forces could expect few or no replacements.

A planned three-week offensive had stretched into three and a half months. The Royalist irregular troops were exhausted by their successful drive. The mismatch in troops made them obviously unable to hold the ground they had captured. The American Embassy backers of the operation recommended that the guerrillas plan a step by step withdrawal back across the Plain of Jars, retreating through a series of four static lines. Key to the original defensive line was Phou Nok Kok. The PAVN attacked Phou Nok Kok's 600 man garrison throughout December, suffering an estimated 400 killed in action and 1,000 wounded, mostly inflicted by close air support. As bad flying weather curtailed air support for the Royalists during January 1970, the communists continued their attacks. On 12 January 1970, after a six-week defense that cost the PAVN about 600 killed, and despite the initial use of RLAF AC-47 gunships for support, the Hmong guerrillas withdrew from the stronghold. They had suffered 12 killed. With the loss of Phou Nok Kok, which barred the eastern entry to the Plain, the Royalists were forced to withdraw.

Nevertheless, Kou Kiet was dubbed "the first major victory in the history of the Royal Lao Government".
