= Howard Freeman (CIA) =

American CIA operative

Howard Freeman is an American CIA operative.

== Combat ==
Between 10–11 March 1968, Freeman was a Paramilitary Officer in the CIA's Special Activities Division and was assigned to command a remote outpost at Phou Pha Thi's Lima Site 85 north of the CIA base at Long Tieng, Laos where the US Air Force had installed a strategic radar system to enable US bombers to launch more accurate raids on North Vietnam. When the Vietnamese overran the 3,000-foot (910 m) mountain outpost, Freeman and a small security detachment of Hmong rushed to the top of the mountain where they engaged in close combat with the enemy, resulting in Freeman's wounding. Freeman was carrying only a sawed-off shotgun and a side arm when he was hit in the back of the leg. Unable by that time to rescue any of the Air Force personnel, Freeman, CIA agent John "Woody" Spence, and their Hmong team were ordered off the mountain. Seven United States personnel, including Freeman and Spence, returned alive from the mission.

Freeman was awarded the CIA's Intelligence Star.

== Later career ==
In his later career, Freeman served with distinction in the Agency's Counterterrorism Center, where he handled some of the CTC's most dangerous assignments.
