= Campaign Toan Thang =

Operation Toan Thang
- Part of the Laotian Civil War and the Vietnam War
Date	18–27 June 1969
Location	Northern Laos
Result	North Vietnamese victory
Territorial changes	North Vietnam captures Muang Soui

Belligerents
North Vietnam	Forces Armee Neutral; Kingdom of Laos; United States; Thailand

Units involved
312th Division; 13th Dac Cong Battalion	Paratroop Battalion 85; 8th Special Requirements (Kingdom of Laos) Royal Lao Air Force (United States) 20th Special Operations Squadron (United States) 21st Special Operations Squadron (United States) 40th Aerospace Rescue and Recovery Squadron (United States) Air America (transport support)

Operation Toan Thang (Operation Total Victory) was the first communist wet season offensive of the Laotian Civil War. Launched on 18 June 1969 and successful by the 27th, the assault by People's Army of Vietnam troops from the 312th Division and sappers of the 13th Dac Cong Battalion captured Muang Soui. Although the defenders outnumbered the assailants by three to one, the only hard surfaced airfield near the Plain of Jars would fall to the communists, depriving the defending Royal Lao Government of its only forward fighter-bomber base.

Operation Toan Thang was an effective riposte to the Royalist attacks of Operation Pigfat and the U.S. Air Force Operation Raindance. The Vietnamese victory at Muang Soui left them firmly in command of the war in northern Laos.

== Overview ==
After World War II, France fought the First Indochina War to retain French Indochina. As part of its loss of that war at Dien Ben Phu, it freed the Kingdom of Laos. Laotian neutrality was established in the 1954 Geneva Agreements. When France withdrew most of its military in conformity with the treaty, the United States filled the vacuum with purportedly civilian paramilitary instructors. A North Vietnamese-backed communist insurrection began as early as 1949. Invading during the opium harvest season of 1953, it settled in northeastern Laos adjacent to the border of the Democratic Republic of Vietnam.

As the Laotian Civil War flared, the Central Intelligence Agency established a secret guerrilla army in the Plain of Jars. Interposed between the communist settlement around Xam Neua and the Royal Lao Government in Vientiane, the Hmong military irregulars fought to hold on to their traditional territory, and to preserve Laos. After the failure and defeat of Operation Pigfat and Operation Raindance in early 1969, the communists had overrun the Plain of Jars to within ten kilometers of the guerrillas' main base at Long Chieng. As a riposte, Hmong General Vang Pao plotted another spoiling offensive against the pressing communists. However, the communists beat him to it.

== Operation Toan Thang ==
After his spoiling attacks in Operation Pigfat, Operation Raindance, and Operation Stranglehold had limited results during early 1969, during the third week of June 1969, the Hmong general was planning yet another incursion into enemy territory. Vang Pao had not only suffered the reverses of his failed offensives, as well as the loss of a forward airfield at Muang Soui; his defensive position was further weakened by Vietnamese communist attacks. Faced with the looming possibility of a final guerrilla defeat, American Ambassador William H. Sullivan and Lao Prime Minister Souvanna Phouma had loosened the restrictive rules of engagement inherent in the Operation Barrel Roll bombing campaign, to little effect. An arc of militia outposts at Lima Sites served as a picket line for the guerrilla army as Vang Pao planned.

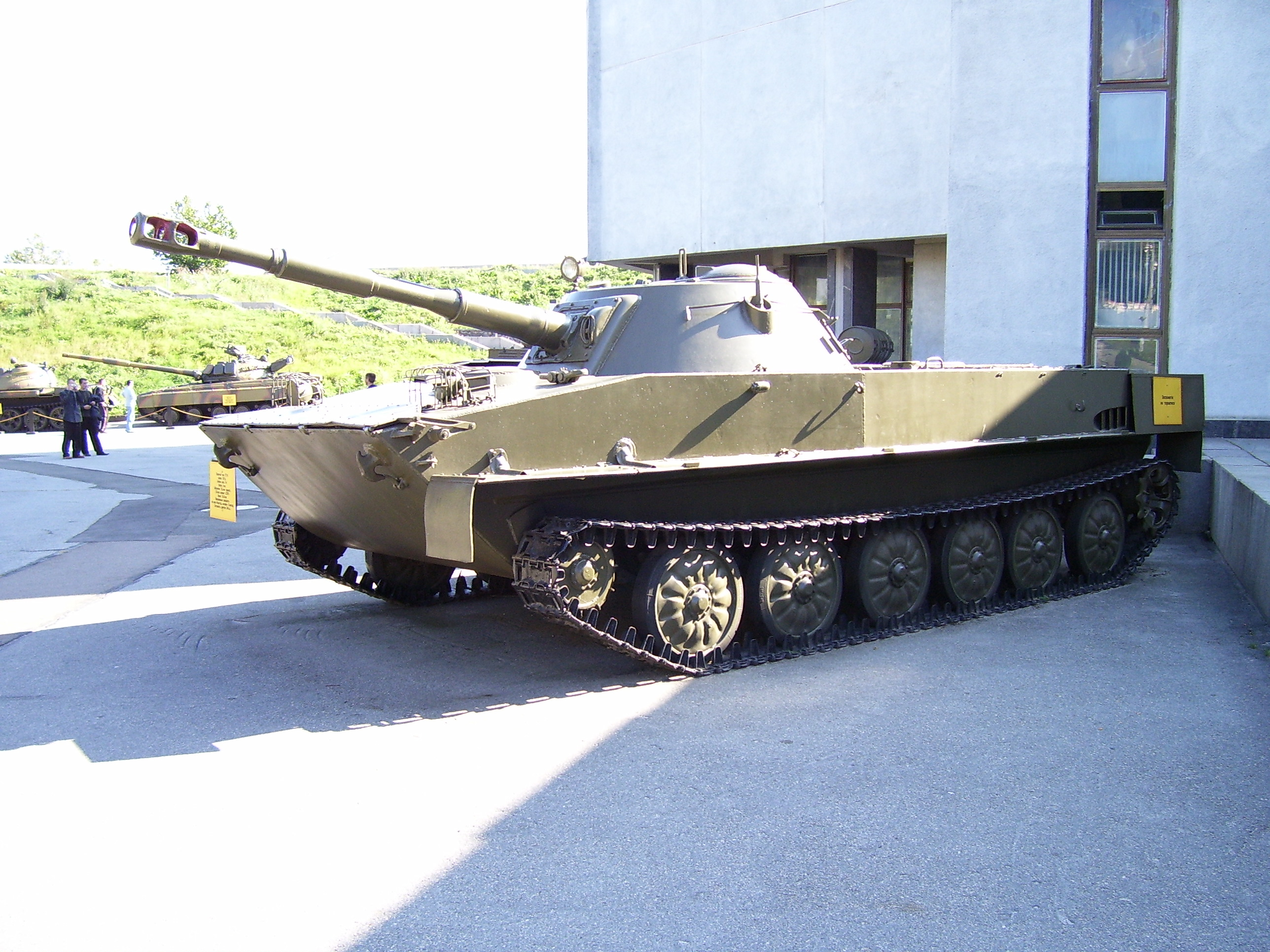
The PT-76 amphibious tank (example shown) was used by the People's Army of Vietnam attack on Muang Soui, 24 June 1969. That was the first use of armor in northern Laos during the Laotian Civil War.

However, the People's Army of Vietnam spoiled Vang Pao's plans with Operation Toan Thang (Total Victory). They finally had the use of an all-weather supply line, Route 7; a second one, Route 72, was nearly complete. Previous rainy seasons had hampered PAVN mobility with muddy trails and bogged logistics; during breaks in the weather, the opposing Royalists had conducted heliborne offensive operations backed by air support. Now the PAVN simply slipped past the Lima site outposts unseen. For the first time in northern Laos, they used armor, launching ten PT-76 light amphibious tanks as part of their 18 June 1969 assault on Muang Soui as part of the first-ever communist wet weather attack.

By 24 June, they had surrounded the base, whose 4,000 defenders outnumbered them by a three to one ratio. PAVN infantry posted to the predawn attack force included the 165th Regiment of the 312th Division, as well as the sappers of the 13th Dac Cong Battalion. The Forces Armee Neutral troops at the Phou Kout outpost scattered under the assault. By dawn, Toan Thang closed in on Neutralist Paratroop Battalion 85 at Ban Khay, where they defended Muang Soui. The assailants went in behind six tanks. Despite being hit with 77 sorties of tactical air that disabled four of the PT-76s, they carried the day. After two killed and 64 wounded, the defenders withdrew to the western edge of the artillery park, abandoning three 155 mm and five 105 mm guns to the communists. With Hmong "stiffeners" assigned, as well as close air support homing in on the enemy, the Neutralists held. The Thai artillerists with them resorted to direct fire of their 105mm howitzers at the advancing foe's armor. That night, U.S. Air Force AC-47 gunships flew watch over the site.

Foul weather plagued 25 June; only 11 sorties of tactical air struck in support of the Royalists. There was a lull in the fighting, during which Neutralists began to drift away from the battlefield. The day passed in relative quiet. On the morning of 26 June, the U.S. Army attaché decided to evacuate Neutralist dependents from the base. Someone dubbed the operation Swan Lake. When the coming evacuation became known, Neutralist soldiers began to drift away southwards toward Xieng Dat. The poor weather continued on the 26th, and air support was limited to 13 sorties.

A scratch fleet of 24 helicopters was gathered for the evacuation. There were 11 Air America H-34s, as well as choppers from the 20th and 21st Special Operations Squadron, and the 40th Aerospace Rescue and Recovery Squadron.

However, once their families were removed, the Neutralist soldiers began to depart to the south, leaving the Thais on their own. Special Requirements 8, the mercenary Thai artillery battalion, was increasingly on its own. By evening, only 500 FAN soldiers were still present. During the night, 200 of them slipped away.

Thai General Phytoon Inkatanawat helicoptered into the besieged position on the 26th, as did several senior officers from the Royal Lao Army. Water and munitions also were helilifted in. However, by evening, only 500 Neutralists remained.

The visiting brass spent the night under heavy incoming artillery fire. By morning, 200 more Neutralists had deserted. The visitors met with four Project 404 American advisors to the Thais at dawn on 27 June. After bitter argument, because the Thais wanted to stand and fight, an evacuation was planned for 1445 hours. Improved weather allowed strikes during the day; 21 USAF and 15 RLAF sorties hit the foe. Then, under enemy fire, about 200 dependents were removed, along with 231 Thai and 51 Hmong. Others left the site on foot, overwatched by an AC-47 gunship. At 1645 hours, the last friendly troops departed, leaving Ban Khay to the communists. One helicopter was lost to PAVN fire, but its crew was rescued. Muang Soui had fallen.

== Aftermath ==
As part of its bomb damage assessment, the U.S. Air Force and Royal Lao Air Force sorties had accounted for seven of the ten attacking tanks by the day of the evacuation. Bombing would continue to strike the foe through 30 June; much abandoned friendly equipment was destroyed along with the enemy. Now that it controlled the Plain of Jars, a communist probe extended down Route 7 past Muang Soui. It briefly cut the only road between Vientiane and Luang Prabang on 28 June.

In losing Muang Soui, Vang Pao and the Royal Lao Government had lost a hard surfaced airstrip that was extremely useful for forward staging of RLAF T-28s for strike missions. Its loss was considered critical and a counterattack to recapture the airfield was considered essential to keep the communists off balance.

Special Requirements 8 returned to Thailand, to be disbanded some months later. With a record 19 battalions of PAVN in or around the Plain of Jars, well furnished with supplies by Route 7, the communists appeared able to carry out such operations as they wished.
