= Wilbur "Will" Greene =

American veteran and CIA agent

Wilbur Murray "Will" Greene (5 September 1930 – 28 April 1972) was a United States Army officer and a paramilitary operative of the Central Intelligence Agency (CIA). Greene first served commendably in the U.S. Special Forces, learning Vietnamese while serving in the Vietnam War and the Korean War. He retired after 20 years (1947–1967) to begin a new career as a Paramilitary Officer in the Special Activities Division (renamed Special Activities Center in 2016) of the Central Intelligence Agency (CIA).

After joining the CIA's Directorate of Operations in 1967, he underwent training before deploying overseas in March 1968. Soon after, his wife died in an auto accident. Greene returned to the U.S. and arranged care for his young children before returning overseas to his assignment.

Known by his call sign "Black Lion," Greene remained in the most dangerous forward Hmong outposts even when ordered to evacuate. From there he directed Hmong troops in heavy combat. In one instance, on 2 December 1969, Greene rallied pro-American guerrillas retreating from a communist attack on Phou Nok Kok by his direction of close air support. In another, on 4 April 1970, Greene led 3 Special Guerrilla Unit in a counterattack during Campaign 139 that prevented the North Vietnamese from overrunning Long Tieng, the main base of General Vang Pao's guerrilla army on the Plain of Jars.

Greene served twice as the CIA's Chief of Paramilitary Operations before dying on the table during a gall bladder operation at Udorn Royal Thai Air Force Base on 28 April 1972. The Operation Black Lion offenses that began in Laos on 18 June 1972 bore his call sign. His CIA superiors praised his "...exceptionally strong leadership and organizational skills, extensive military experiences, perseverance under harsh conditions, and ability to train others..."

In 2008, Greene was recognized for his outstanding leadership as a Paramilitary Case Officer by the officers of the Special Activities Division during a ceremony at CIA Headquarters as part of a Black History Month commemoration.
