= Operation Pigfat =

- Part of Laotian Civil War; Vietnam War
Date	26 November 1968 – 7 January 1969
Location	Plain of Jars in northeastern Laos
Result	U.S. Air Force and Royalist guerrilla offensive against Vietnamese communists

Belligerents
Kingdom of Laos	North Vietnam (Laos) Pathet Lao

Commanders and leaders
Vang Pao	

Units involved
U.S. Air Force; Royal Lao Air Force; 8 guerrilla battalions	18 PAVN battalions 2 Pathet Lao battalions 148th PAVN Regiment

Strength
Battalion-size	Regimental- and battalion-size

Casualties and losses
300 killed 500 wounded 400 missing	Heavy

Operation Pigfat was a crucial guerrilla offensive of the Laotian Civil War; it lasted from 26 November 1968 to 7 January 1969. Launched by Hmong tribal soldiers backed by the Central Intelligence Agency, it was based on the usage of overwhelming air power to clear the path for the guerrillas. The guerrillas were faced with the largest concentration of Vietnamese communist troops stationed outside Vietnam, and hoped to spoil that imminent attack.

In the event, the promised air power allotment was halved and curtailed. Intermittent foul weather also restricted air operations. Nevertheless, the Hmong assault against communists on the mountain of Phou Pha Thi nearly carried the position in mid-December. However, a communist night raid that destroyed an ammunition dump, followed by the arrival of a relief column from the 316th Division, tipped the balance of battle against the assailants. On 7 January 1969, the Hmong retreated while pressed hard by the communists.

Both sides took heavy casualties. However, the Vietnamese had abundant manpower to be trained as replacements. By contrast, the Hmong replacement pool was scanty. Moreover, the communists ended their follow-up drive within ten kilometers of the Hmong main bases at Long Chieng and Sam Thong.

== Overview ==
After World War II, France found itself in the First Indochina War. As part of its loss of that war at Dien Ben Phu, it freed the Kingdom of Laos. Laotian neutrality was established in the 1954 Geneva Agreements. When France withdrew most of its military in conformity with the treaty, the United States filled the vacuum with purportedly civilian paramilitary instructors. A North Vietnamese-backed communist insurrection began as early as 1949. Invading during the opium harvest season of 1953, it settled in northeastern Laos adjacent to the border of the Democratic Republic of Vietnam.

As the Laotian Civil War flared, the Central Intelligence Agency established a secret guerrilla army in the Plain of Jars. Interposed between the communist settlement around Xam Neua and the Royal Lao Government in Vientiane, the Hmong military irregulars fought to hold on to their traditional territory, and to preserve Laos.

== Background ==
The Royal Lao Army having been rendered essentially useless in the wake of the Battle of Nam Bac, the brunt of fighting the Laotian Civil War fell upon the Hmong guerrillas led by General Vang Pao. These Royalist irregulars faced a formidable force equivalent to 16 battalions of enemy troops clustered around the Pathet Lao capital of Xam Neua. Also arrayed against the guerrillas were two People's Army of Vietnam battalions near Nakhang, plus the 2 Pathet Lao Battalion augmented by two 82mm mortars and a 12.7mm machine gun. At this time, this was the strongest communist military concentration outside the borders of the Democratic Republic of Vietnam. This concentration was already threatening the strategic Plain of Jars at the end of the wet season; the upcoming dry season was the usual time for communist offensives.

== The operation ==
By October 1968, with the dry season pending, Vang Pao plotted a spoiling attack to be launched 1 November. He anticipated increased air support from American fighter-bombers because the Operation Rolling Thunder air campaign against North Vietnam had stood down, freeing up those air strikes for use in Laos. Additionally, the 56th Special Operations Wing based at Udorn Royal Thai Air Force Base, Thailand had three A-1 Skyraider squadrons available. The Royal Lao Air Force would also be flying its T-28s from Vientiane; debuting in combat were Hmong pilots. These latter pressed home their undisciplined pointblank attacks with reckless courage, often returning in an aircraft holed by the backblast of their own dropped ordnance.

This larger air effort could be controlled through a new Air Operations Center dedicated to backing the Hmong. Newly trained forward air guides would help coordinate close air support. Because of this available airpower, Vang Pao planned to commit his guerrillas to a spoiling attack ranging out from forward bases at Nakhang and Houei Hinsa to sweep across Route 6. The Central Intelligence Agency section stationed in the American embassy believed that by disrupting the communists' expected usual dry season offensive, Vang Pao could gain the initiative in the struggle for northern Laos.

Supply difficulties delayed the start of the operation for a week. Then the guerrilla forces launched their assault against heavy communist resistance. Poor weather hampered Hmong progress. Only in the third week of November did the guerrillas begin to gain ground, their way cleared by heavy use of air strikes. At this point, Vang Pao enlarged his spoiling attack into a full-fledged off-season offensive aimed at Phou Pha Thi, dubbing it Operation Pigfat. He claimed the recapture of this mountain was essential to Hmong morale, as they considered it sacred. At the same time, the captured radar installation at Lima Site 85 could be regained. Vang Pao asserted he wished to recover the bodies of the U.S. airmen killed in action at the radar site. The offensive would also serve the purpose of disrupting enemy moves on the guerrilla base of Nakhang.

Pigfat was an eight battalion undertaking. One guerrilla battalion would defend Nakhang. Three more would be the offensive force. Four Royalist militia battalions would also support the attack. An air requirement of 100 daily U.S. Air Force strike sorties was slated for cover.

The three battalion assault force was due to move out on 26 November. However, Vang Pao refused to launch the attack until 6 December. Despite reconnaissance showing no enemy around the landing zone, Vang Pao insisted that his ancestor had appeared in a dream to warn him that the enemy awaited him, although intelligence reports insisted the landing zone was clear. After landing on 6 December, the attack force formed four columns to advance on Phou Pha Thi. They found themselves with only half the U.S. air sorties planned upon, and that commitment for five days only; the brand new Operation Commando Hunt truck killing campaign on the Ho Chi Minh Trail was absorbing the rest. The push soon reached the hamlet of Houei Ma, six kilometers southwest of the Lima Site 85 objective. At this point, 10,000 refugees from the communists flooded the village, clogging the Hmong offensive. A few of the refugees were randomly picked for questioning by CIA agents accompanying the guerrillas. They verified that during the previous week, when the original assault was supposed to land, just as the ancestral dream had predicted, a large transient contingent of Vietnamese soldiers returning from the Luang Prabang front had been near the landing zone.

The civilian populace had to be evacuated while enemy mortar shells rained in. The communist mortars took counterfire from 105 mm howitzers, and air strikes from both U.S. and Lao fighter-bombers. On 6 and 7 December, the 11th and 12th days of Pigfat, air strikes hit Phou Pha Thi with rocketry, bombs, and napalm. On 8 December, a hand grenade was accidentally detonated in an incoming helicopter, destroying the copter and killing all hands aboard. That same day, a Republic F-105 Thunderchief and two A-1E Skyraiders were also lost.

On 13 December, as the available air sorties dwindled, a Hmong guerrilla company assaulted Phou Pha Thi from the southeast. Shunning guerrilla tactics, the hill tribesmen surged up the hill in a frontal assault. Trapped on a trail on the southeast face by enemy fire, they spent 24 hours pinned down before retreating under 12.7mm machine gun fire from the summit. The machine gun was subsequently knocked out of action by artillery fire, but the Hmong were unable to regain the hill.

With another 12.7mmm machine gun on the summit, plus an 82 mm heavy mortar, the communists showed enough strength to stall the Hmong. Vang Pao was informed by a North Vietnamese defector that his former comrades were dubious about holding the hilltop position. However, the Hmong general began to doubt his troops' ability to continue. It was at this juncture that three days of air strikes, including napalm, were laid upon the ridge top. The 82 mm mortar was disabled by an F-4 Phantom strike. Circling Hmong attacks curled about Phou Pha Thi to both east and west; the latter cut the communist-held supply line to the ridge, Route 602. From questioning prisoners, and from intercepted radio messages, Vang Pao learned that the enemy was also dubious of success; one of their defending battalions had lost half its manpower.

Then, as Hmong probes tested for weaknesses in PAVN Group 766's defenses, the weather went bad. Two days of cloudy weather stifled air support for the Hmong. Then, as flying weather improved and air support once again increased, on 18 December the Hmong renewed their attack up Phou Pha Thi. As they reached the top, they ran into a heavy machine gun that drove them back off the summit.

By 21 December, the action was stalemated. The PAVN broke the tie with a night raid on Houei Ma that blew up an ammunition depot and a howitzer. On 25 December, the 148 Regiment of the 316th Division launched a relief expedition from Xam Neua. Vang Pao attempted to counter that by having an appeal for surrender taped by a communist prisoner; he hoped to spark mass desertion before the relief column arrived. On 26 and 27 December, he had the appeal broadcast at the enemy via Helio Courier. An RLAF forward operating base at Muang Soui was stockpiled with ordnance; Thai mercenary pilots were slated to fly short strike missions from there against northerly Plain of Jars targets. However, PAVN sappers infiltrated at 02:00 on 1 January 1969, killing one of the onsite U.S. advisors and 11 of the local troops. The defenders trickled away.

In the interim, Vang Pao was scheming a renewal of the offensive in a week, on 3 January. However, this new assault was never launched. Instead, the 148 Regiment survived air strikes to arrive on 5 January as communist reinforcements. Bullpup missiles fired from U.S. fighter-bombers were used in a vain try at breaking the communists. They failed, at the cost of a friendly fire incident. On 7 January 1969, Vang Pao ended Operation Pigfat. The retreat began.

== Aftermath ==
Operation Pigfat had killed hundreds of communist troops; the relief column's 148th Regiment was committed only 13 days and suffered 120 killed in action and 280 wounded. Group 766, which they aided, ended the campaign with fewer than 480 men in its three battalions. These casualties would have to be replaced. According to the U.S. Air Force, the Royalists suffered 40 killed and 131 wounded in action. According to another source, out of the 1,800 Hmong guerrillas committed to battle, there were about 300 killed in action, 500 wounded, and 400 gone missing. They had never before taken a casualty rate of over 50 percent. In either case, Hmong replacement for casualties was difficult, due to their limited pool of recruits. The Hmong withdrew with the PAVN pressing them. The PAVN communists captured Nakhang and dispatched the commanding officer, who doubled as both commander and province governor; this cemented communist control over the province. Nakhang would remain in communist hands henceforth.

Pushing down further into the Plain of Jars with their heaviest yet forces of the war, the communists bore down on the main Hmong bases of Long Chieng and Sam Thong. When they came within ten kilometers of the bases, all able-bodied males within them were armed. Dependent Hmong families began to sleep in the woods at night, hoping to evade any ground assault.

Secretive meetings began among the hill tribes, Lao Theung as well as Hmong. Various bands packed up for dispersal into Sayaboury Province or elsewhere. The tribal leaders told Vang Pao that escape routes had been picked. However, they still relied on the general's advice. General Vang Pao considered other unexpected preemptive attacks, eventually leading to Operation Off Balance six months later.
