= Viengxay Caves =

Cave network in Laos

Coordinates: 20.40°N 104.23°E

The Viengxay Caves in Houaphanh Province of north-eastern Laos are an extensive network of caves in limestone mountains. Four-hundred eighty of these caves were used by the Pathet Lao during the Second Indochina War to shelter from American bombardment.

Up to 23,000 people lived in the caves, which contained a hospital, a school, Pathet Lao offices, bakeries, shops, and even a theatre. The area was home to the communist forces, who were fighting the royalist forces, based in Vientiane. The caves were used for living and working in because the U. S. Air Force was bombing the area so heavily. Locals say that farmers had to farm at night to avoid bombing raids. Viengxay served as a base for the communist forces (and holding facility for captured US servicemen) because it was close to the North Vietnamese border for logistical and political support.

The Lao government intends to promote the caves as a tourism destination, similar to the Củ Chi tunnels near Ho Chi Minh City in Vietnam and the Killing Fields Memorial near Phnom Penh in Cambodia. It is an unusual site in that it offers the opportunity to explore a largely intact revolutionary base.

The World Tourism Organization (UNWTO), Netherlands Development Agency and Asian Development Bank have been asked to help develop the site for international visitors. A project plan has been drawn up in conjunction with the Caves Office and implementation has begun, with improved signage and interpretation at sites.
