= Phou Kout district =

Phou Kout district ເມືອງພູກູດ
- District
- Interactive map of Phou Kout district
- Country: Laos
- Province: Xiangkhouang
- Time zone: UTC+7 (ICT)

Phou Kout is a district (muang) of Xiangkhouang province in north-central Laos. The district includes the rarely visited Site 25 of the Plain of Jars.
