= Muang Soui =

Muang Suoi
- Town
- Location within Laos
- Coordinates: 19°31′15″N 102°53′10″E
- Country: Laos
- Province: Xiangkhouang
- Elevation: 1,097 m (3,599 ft)
- Time zone: UTC+7 (Laos Standard Time)

Muang Soui (Lao: ເມືອງສຸຍ), also spelled Muang Souy or Muong Soui, is a small town in Xiangkhouang Province Laos. It is located on Route 7 of Laos, east of Phoukhoune district, northwest of Phonsavan and Ban Phou Pheung Noi, and north of Sam Thong, and Long Tieng.

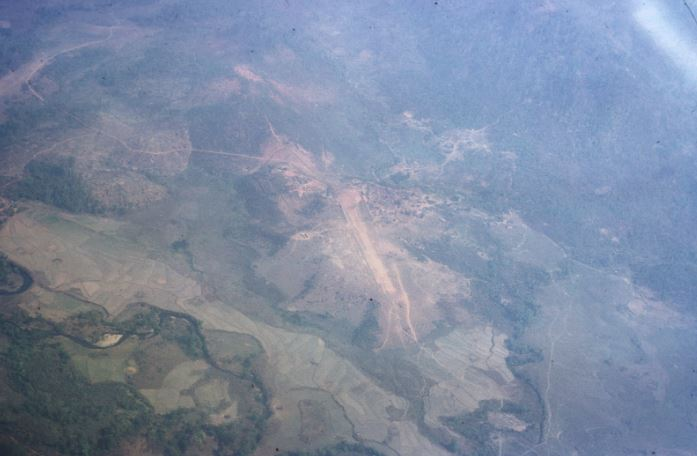
Panoramic view, c. Photo of Muong Soui taken from the sky after 1975

== History ==
Muang Soui (Lao: ເມືອງ ສຸຍ) or Muang Souy was a small town which was located in the Xiangkhouang Province, Laos. Its population was around 10,000 in 1965. It was a small town among many like the cities of Phonsavan, Plain of Jars, Lathuang, Nong Het, Long Tieng, Sam Thong and many others. These towns were all located in Xiangkhouang Province. They were all well known during and before the Vietnam War 1961–1975. Muang Soui was created shortly before 1960 when Captain Kong Le overthrew the Royal Lao Government in a coup, 1960 Laotian coups, on August 10, 1960. Before this town was created and called Muang Soui, the old name of that town was Ban Nong Tang (Lao: ບ້ານ ໜອງຕາງ).

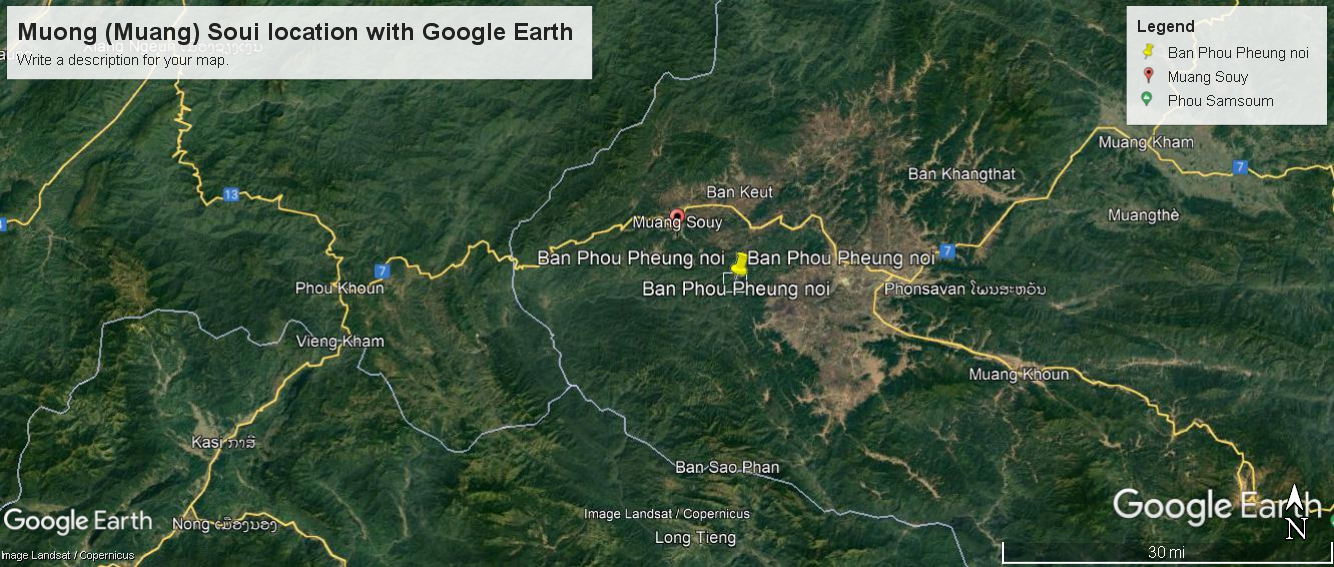
Muong (Muang) Soui location on Google Earth

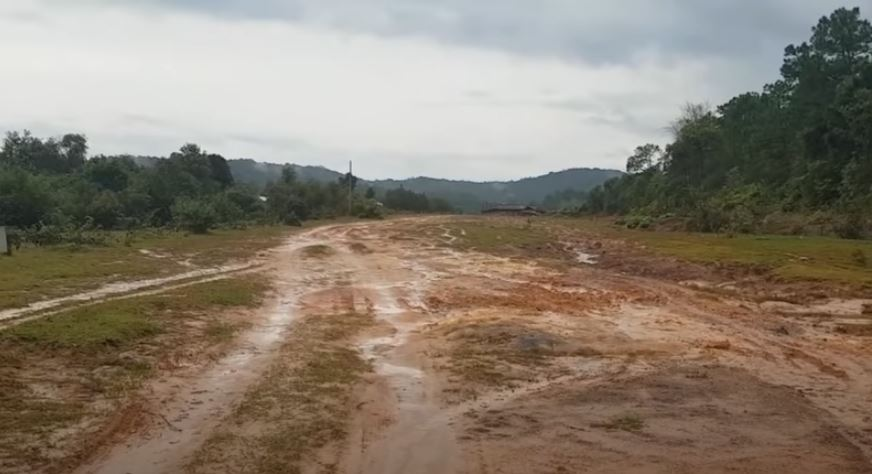
It was the airport of the CIA and General Vang Pao during the Vietnam War 1961 - 1975 in Muong Soui-Nong Tang

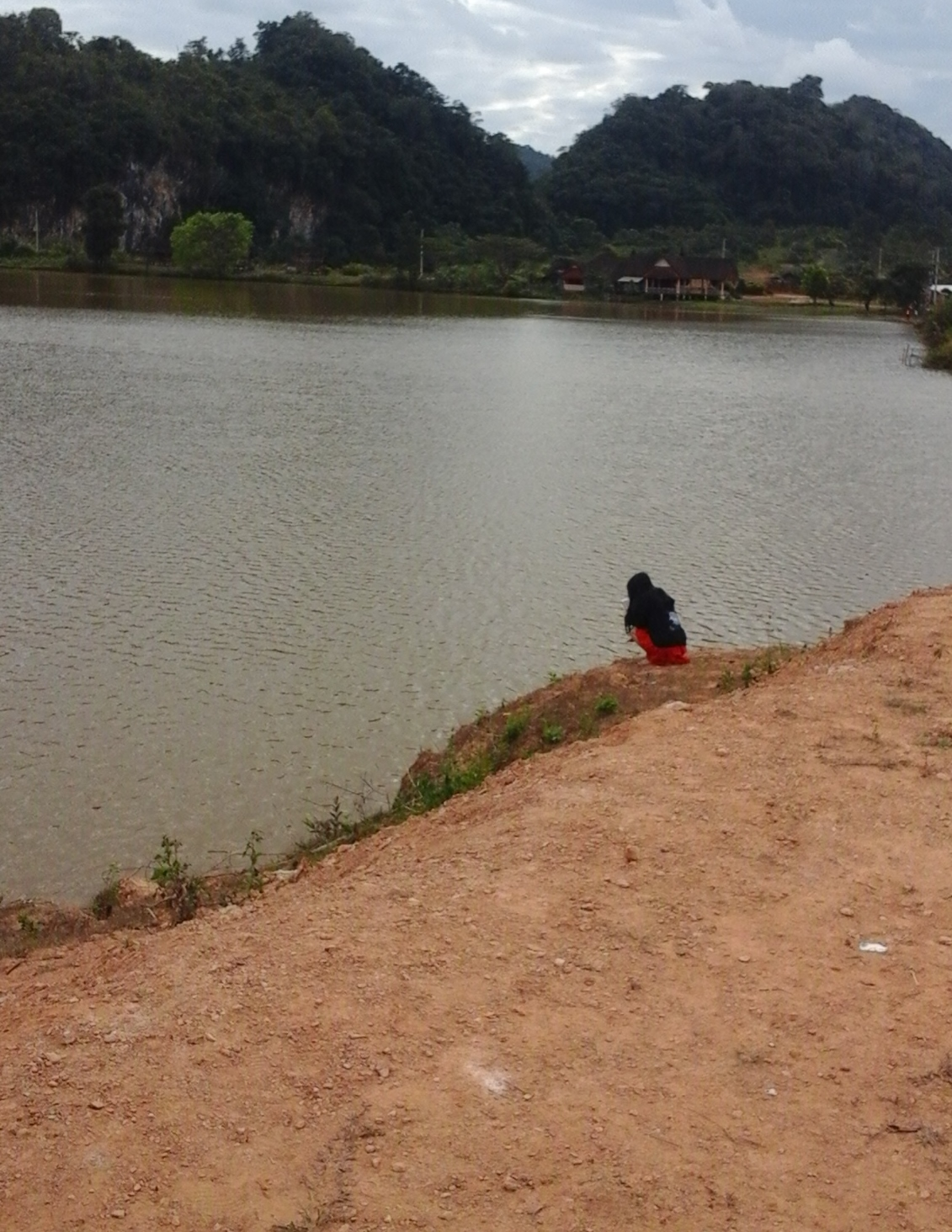
Nong Tang Lake - Picture taken in December 2016

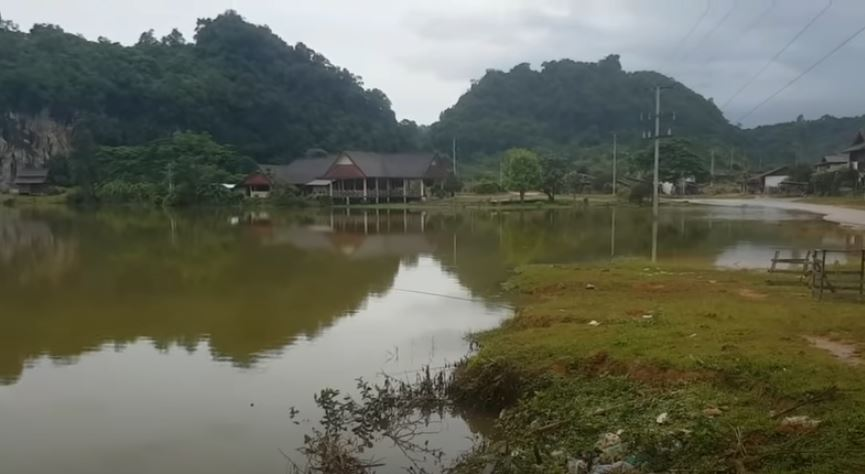
This city of Nong Tang has existed since 1900. During the Vietnam War 1961 - 1970, it was called Muang Soui.

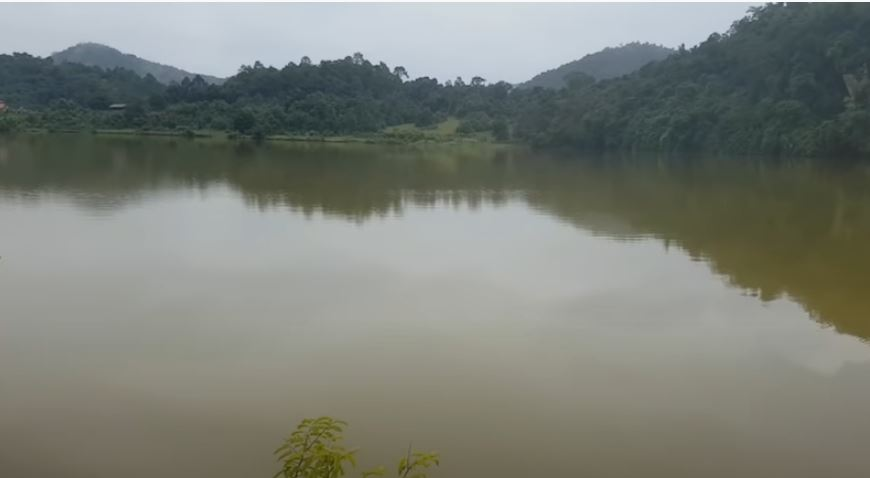
This is Nong Tang Lake. Before the Vietnam War 1961, it was huge and beautiful like the sea.

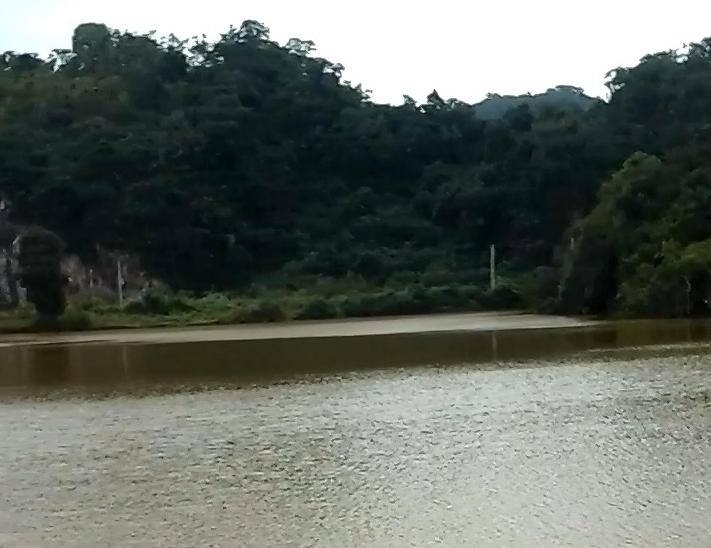
Part of Nong Tang lake - Picture taken in December 2016

At that time, most people chose to live in Ban Nong Lan (Lao: ບ້ານ ໜອງລານ) and Ban Nato (Lao: ບ້ານ ນາໂຕ) . These two neighboring villages were not very far from Muang Soui. They are located about 3 to 5 kilometers southwest of Muang Soui. Most people, The Tai Phuan, who lived there spoke a slightly different dialect from the others who came from southern and western Laos. Today, the two villages are still there, at their locations, with the exception of the town of Muang Soui.

During the 1940s, the villagers of Ban Nonglan (Lao: ບ້ານ ໜອງລານ) and Ban Nato (Lao: ບ້ານ ນາໂຕ) including those of Ban Nong Tang (Lao: ບ້ານ ໜອງຕາງ) were all farmers. Mostly, they were Phuan people. There was a market which is opened once a week in the village of Ban Nato. Many people from neighboring villages have come to do their shopping once per week. Then there were some itinerant merchants who were Chinese coming to sell sugars, salt, clothes, fabrics, pots, dishes and more like spoons etc. These Chinese merchants used horses as their means of transporting goods when they were moved to villages. When people did not have cash to pay a merchandise, then they paid it with opium instead.

The name of Muang Soui took that of Ban Nong Tang, which was a small village located by the lake "Nong Tang". This change was due to the increasing of people arriving in this county. The name, NongTang, came from the name of the lake behind the village. The lake sits on a body of water surrounded by limestone rocks that form a wall in the background.

In the early 1960s, the part of the lake that faces Route 7 of Laos, seen from the front, under the limestone rocks, looked like there was a cave. The waves moved and disappeared in the cave as the wind blew across the surface of the water. It was as if there was a hole under the limestone rocks. At that time, on the other side of the limestone rocks where the village called (Ban) Nato is located, there was also a part of the lake which flowed below the rocks as it was part of that of NongTang. Today, the lake has become smaller than it was 70 years ago. The water level is about 80 – 100 meters lower in width and then 5–10 meters in depth compared to 1960. This must have been a problem of the planet and the drought of the earth, especially of the environment in which it is located.

According to the history of Laos, the inhabitants of Xiangkhouang Province were called Tai Phuan Phuan people because they were from the region Muang Phuan or Xiangkhouang province. Except the Khmu people, the Khmu tribe Lao Theung, who are the first inhabitants discovered in this region for centuries before the arrival of King Fa Ngum in the middle of the 14th century, this region was ruled before by the youngest son of the king of Khun Borom. Historically, the Laotian, Lao-Tai – 59.2% (including Lao, Tai people, Phu Tai, Lu, Phuan) arrived in Muang Phuan only in the 13th century, and King Fa Ngum conquered the Muang Phuan region, XiangKhouang Province, in the middle of the 14th century.

In 1940, the first county chief of this region was called Thao Keo. He was the first “Tasseng" (county chief) elected in this county. After Thao keo, it was the turn of Thao Thitphone who was elected in 1950, then Thao Xieng Bouasy in 1959, and then Thao Vandee in 1963. These county chiefs were people who were born in Nong Tang, Nong Lan, and Nato-xiengna. They were descendants of native Phuan people of Xiangkhouang province. Tasseng is a Lao term meaning county chief. Nai Ban is also a Lao term meaning village chief. This is how Thao Van Dee was the county chief of Muang Soui at the time of Kou Kiet Laotian Civil War.

Muang Soui is located in the middle in between Eastnorthern and Westnorthen of Laos. In this small town, there was a lot of things to see and do during that time, especially before Operation Off Balance. It was a city that was in the process of development. Not to mention the commerce and the population to come, social media and administrative services began to take hold. An airport has been built as well as a flea market. Along the street next to the airport, there were plenty of shops of sorts, then came the Vietnam War which rotted the whole region including the east, west, north and south of Xiangkhouang province. At that time the neighboring villages which were closest to Muang Soui, then considered as local villages are Ban Xiengna, Ban Nonglan, Ban Ouan, Ban Vangkham, Ban Nato, Ban Xiang, Ban Souy-Nua (1), Ban Chomsi, Ban Nôk, Ban Sak, Ban Theun, Ban Souy (2), Ban Mang, Ban Pong, Muang Souy, Ban Nong, Ban Nakom, Ban Nongtang (1), Ban Souy-Tai (2), Ban Hè and Ban Nongtang (2). In the west, there were also some other neighboring villages such as Ban Hak, Ban Pangpang, Ban Xamkeo (Xam kiam), Ban Pong Tau, Phou Vieng and Phou Sse. In the east, there was Ban Khai, Ban Phou kout, Ban Xay, Ban Lathuang, and Ban PhouDouk. In the south, there was Ban Huei Kinine, Ban Phou Pheung Noi and Ban Keobokuang.

== Laotian Civil War ==
Muang Soui was a land of war during the Lao Civil War and Operation Off Balance between 1961 and 1969. The city was partly occupied by Captain Kong Le's army at that time. Some of his military troops had settled east of Muang Soui in Phou Kout mountain, Phou Kout district and then others in Phonsavan and the Plain of Jars.

Due to its location northwest of the strategic Plain of Jars, the town with its all weather runway (designated Lima Site 108 or LS-108) was a major base area for the Forces Armées Neutralistes (FAN) a "third force" in the Laotian Civil War from 1961 until 1966. The town was overlooked by the People's Army of Vietnam (PAVN) and Pathet Lao (PL) positions on the Phou Kout District (Lao: ເມືອງ ພູກູດ), The FAN attempted unsuccessfully to take the Phou Kout District ridgeline in Operation Triangle in July 1964 Following the disintegration of the FAN into pro and anti-communist forces in 1966, the town was effectively controlled by the Royal Lao Army. Captured by units of the PAVN 312th Division supported by PT-76 light tanks during the Campaign Toan Thang in June 1969. Royalist forces supported by U.S. airpower tried unsuccessfully to recapture Muang Soui during Operation Off Balance in early July 1969. The town was recaptured by Royalist forces in late September 1969 during Operation About Face. After falling again to the Communists, it was recaptured by Royalist troops in Phou Khao Kham during August 1971.

After the Vietnam War ended in 1975, the town of Muong Soui became nowhere else. It is no longer on the map of Laos. Now, the name of this city returns to Nong Tang on the roads and on the map of the country.

== See also ==
- Ban Phou Pheung Noi
- Sam Thong
- Route 7 (Laos)
- Hmong New Year
- Tchao Anouvong cave
- Anouvong district
- Kuang Si Falls
