= Phou Pha Thi =

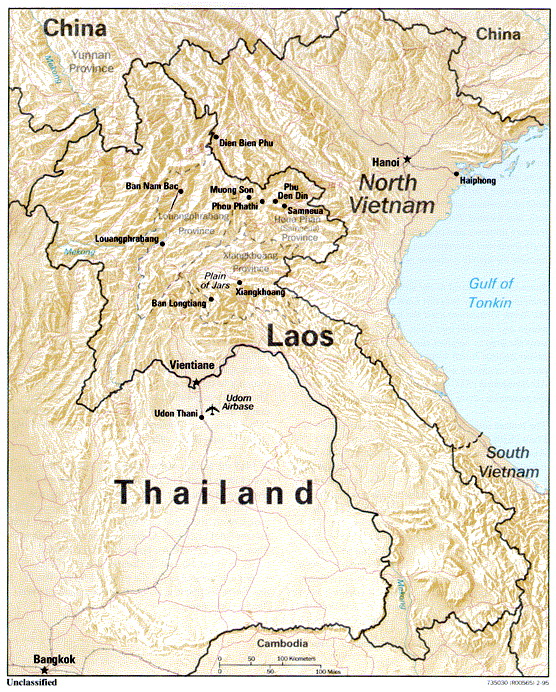
- The mountaintop military area of Laos Site 85 was at the curved location of the Phou Pha Thi cliff.

Highest point
- Elevation: 1,786 m (5,860 ft)
- Coordinates: 20.468°N 103.7058°E

Geography
- Location: Laos
- Parent range: Annam Highlands

Phou Pha Thi (Phathi Lao: ຜາຖີ່ ) is a "sacred mountain" in Laos "believed...inhabited by great "phi", or spirits and used for the clandestine Lima Site 85 military installation during the Vietnam War. The lightly defended installation was destroyed by North Vietnamese attackers in the 10-11 March 1968 Battle of Lima Site 85. From 1994 to 2004, searches for USAF remains were conducted at the mountain, but few bodies were located. The mountain is "100 miles south of Dien Bien Phu, 160 miles west of Hanoi, and just 25 miles from the capital of Samneua". The site had been used as a military site by French colonialists until seized by the North Vietnamese in 1962, and the Hmong "Secret Army" recaptured the area and a Central Intelligence Agency airstrip was built by 1966.

== Description ==
"Pha-thi mountain...runs from north of the Huoi-san stream to south of the Nam-het River, a distance of about 7,000 meters. It is the highest peak in the region. ... All four sides of the karst are sheer cliffs that are between 50 and 200 meters high... From about mid-way between the base and the summit of the mountain, the sides were formed by 75° to 80° cliffs, and in some spots 85° to 90° cliffs." "The peak of Pha-thi mountain is at least 3-4 kilometers from the surrounding peaks... To the north and northeast is the 1392 meters high Phu-hin-he ridge. To the south [of Phu-hin-he ridge] is the 1148 meter [Phou Huoi] Kha-moun [ridge]. To the east are the 1425 meter Phu-bao ridge, the 1223 meter Phu-hin-sa ridge, and the 1442 meter Phu-den-dinh ridge. To the south and southeast are the 1586 meter Phu-huoi-hao ridge and the 1225 meter Phu-huoi-na ridge. To the west and southwest are high points 1443, 1088, 1052, 1148, and 1007" (Do Chi Ben, 1996).
