= List of covert sites of the Laotian Civil War =

Covert sites of the Laotian Civil War were clandestine U.S. military installations for conducting covert paramilitary and combat operations in the Kingdom of Laos. Airstrips within the Kingdom of Laos were originally designated by Air America as "Site XX" (with XX being a number). In September 1961, the designation changed to "VS XX", meaning "Victor Site XX". On 16 May 1964, the airstrips received their final designation; the site names then used the abbreviation "LS"—Lima Site—for unimproved strips, or "L"—Lima—for paved runways. The terms "Victor" and "Lima" were taken from the existing military phonetic code.

These sites typically were centered on a dirt landing strip for STOL aircraft such as the Air America Helio Courier or Pilatus Porter. These strips were often carved out along ridge lines, and were seldom flat, straight, or of sufficient length. However, they were crucial for resupply and personnel transport, including medical evacuations. To quote one source: "Some of these defied all the safety rules even of military aviation." A U.S. Air Force inspection team noted that even the best of the Lima strips was inferior to any air strips in Vietnam. Listing follows.

Lima sites of the Laotian Civil War
No.	Name	Width × length	Elevation	Coordinates	Remarks
LS2	San Tiau	100 × 800 ft	5,000 ft	19.475°N 103.568°E	Used as base for Kou Kiet
LS03	Nong Het	100 × 1,200 ft	4,700 ft	19.4944°N 103.993°E	
L 05	Paksong	3,445 ft			
LS5	Ban Pa Dong	70 × 1,670 ft	4,600 ft	19.1036°N 103.1175°E	Original site of Operation Momentum
LS6	Vang Viang	90 × 4,400 ft	800 ft	18.9247°N 102.45062°E	
L08	Vientiane		561 ft		Air operations center for Military Region 5
L10	Attopeu		344 ft.		
LS10	Ban Ban	100 × 1,500 ft.	1,888 ft	19.634°N 103.5783°E	
L11	Pakse		330 ft		Air operations center for Military Region 4
LS15	Ban Na	75 X 1,200 ft	5,050 ft	19.3316°N 102.9597°E	
LS19	Phou Khe		6,200 ft	19.3144°N 103.2656°E	
LS20	Sam Thong	50 X 1,900 ft	3,800 ft	19.1839°N 102.8725°E	Center for USAID refugee relief
LS20A	Long Tieng	60 X 4,450 ft	3,250 ft	19.1083°N 102.9253°E	Air operations center for Military Region 2
LS22	Xieng Khouang	32 X 3,030 ft	3,444 ft	18.5732°N 103.1551°E	
L25	Ban Huoeisay Airport		1,380 ft		
LS26	Xieng Dat	150 × 4,000 ft	2,350 ft	19.4158°N 102.7117°E	
LS30					See LS20A.
LS32	Bouamlong	75 X 1,300 ft	4,000 ft	19.4532°N 103.1953°E	
LS36	Na Khang		4,400 ft	19.977°N 103.475°E	
L39	Savannakhet		509 ft		Air operations center for Military Region 3
L44	Salavan		550 ft.		
L51	Pha Khe (west of LS20A Long Tieng)				
L54	Luang Prabang International Airport		997 ft		Air operations center for Military Region I
LS57	Phou So		4,500 ft	19.641184, 102.917037	(Google coordinates)
LS61	Muang Phalan TACAN Site			16.658°N 105.561°E	
LS69	Ban Xieng Lom		1,900 ft		
LS85	Phou Pha Thi		4,500 ft	20.4381°N 103.7212°E	TACAN was overrun on 11 March 1968
LS88	Bouam Long	40 × 800 ft	5,000 ft	19.7589°N 103.3314°E	Used as base for Kou Kiet
LS98	Long Tieng		3,120 ft	19.1083°N 102.9353°E	
L108	Muang Soui		3,600 ft	19.5208°N 102.886°E	
L118A	Nam Yu		1,900 ft		
LS123	Xam Xauj				Commander, Major Wa Kai Vue
LS178	Phou Saly		3,200 ft		
LS187	Ban Y				
LS189	Ban Houei Sane		480 ft		
LS265	Old San Soak				
LS272	Ban Xong-Na Xu		??? ft	18.924298°N 102.712401°E	
LS 289	Khong Sedone		450 ft	UTM WC8524	
LS 337	Phou Kang Neua (Xiangkhouang)				
LS 449	Toong Set		4,100 ft	UTM XB3781	Alternative designation PS 49
Online sources: Chance FAC website: http://www.chancefac.net/A-cs_pgs_rebuild/Lima_Sites/LS_Pg1.htm http://www.chancefac.net/A-cs_pgs_rebuild/Lima_Sites/LS_Pg2.htm http://www.chancefac.net/A-cs_pgs_rebuild/Lima_Sites/LS_Pg3.htm http://www.chancefac.net/A-cs_pgs_rebuild/Lima_Sites/LS_Pg4.htm http://www.chancefac.net/A-cs_pgs_rebuild/Lima_Sites/LS_Pg5.htm: Laos list website; Laos Lima Site (LS) Information, 7 March 2006: All web pages retrieved 26 December 2014.; Textual sources as noted.

== See also ==
- Laotian Civil War
- Kingdom of Laos
- North Vietnamese invasion of Laos
- People's Army of Vietnam
- Hmong people
- Lao Veterans of America
- Laos Memorial
- Lao Veterans of America Institute

== Bibliography ==
- Ahern, Thomas L. Jr. (2006). Undercover Armies: CIA and Surrogate Warfare in Laos. Center for the Study of Intelligence. Classified control no. C05303949.
- Conboy, Kenneth and James Morrison (1995). Shadow War: The CIA's Secret War in Laos. Paladin Press, ISBNs 0-87364-825-0, 978-1-58160-535-8.
- Hukle, Donald G.; Melvin F. Porter; Paul T. Ringenbach; Richard R. Sexton; Judith A. Skipworth; Adolph H. Zabka. (1974). The Bolovens Campaign, 28 July - 28 December 1971 (Project CHECO Southeast Asia Report). Pacific Air Force CHECO Division. ASIN: B00B65VIOU.
