= Operation Off Balance =

- Part of Laotian Civil War; Vietnam War
Date	1 – 15 July 1969
Location	Plain of Jars in northeastern Laos
Result	Unsuccessful Royalist attempt to blunt an enemy offensive

Belligerents
Kingdom of Laos	North Vietnam

Commanders and leaders
Vang Pao	

Units involved
Bataillon Guerrier 206; Bataillon Commando 208; 101 Bataillon de Parachutistes; Bataillon Guerrier 201; Bataillon d'Infanterie 15; U.S. Air Force; Royal Lao Air Force	19 PAVN battalions with 8+ tanks

Strength
Battalion-size	Battalion-size

Casualties and losses
Unknown	Unknown

Operation Off Balance was a hastily planned offensive operation of the Laotian Civil War; it happened between 1 and 15 July 1969 on the Plain of Jars in the Kingdom of Laos. The Royal Lao Government forces in Military Region 1 of Laos had just been evicted from the crucial all-weather airfield at Muang Soui, as well as most of the Plain, on 28 June 1969. Hmong General Vang Pao planned a quick counter-offensive to recapture the airfield from his communist foe; it would kick off on 1 July, supported by 60 sorties per day of tactical air strikes from Operation Barrel Roll.

In the event, the 1 July offensive ran afoul of its Neutralist allies, who retreated rather than carry out their assault. A constant flow of reinforcements from the attacking People's Army of Vietnam fed their own strength to resist. With the Neutralists' abstention, the remaining forces in Off Balance—two battalions of Hmong guerrillas and a Royalist paratrooper battalion— were defeated by counterattacking communist tanks supported by heavy artillery. During the battle, the Hmong suffered the loss of their only fighter pilot, Lee Lue. The reputation he had gained while flying over 5,000 combat missions had become the symbol of Hmong resistance; his death was a crushing blow to Hmong morale. Operation Off Balance ended the day of Lee Lue's burial. The communists still held the Plain of Jars and Muang Soui.

== Overview ==
After World War II, France fought the First Indochina War to retain French Indochina. As part of its loss of that war at Dien Ben Phu, it freed the Kingdom of Laos. Laotian neutrality was established in the 1954 Geneva Agreements. When France withdrew most of its military in conformity with the treaty, the United States filled the vacuum with purportedly civilian paramilitary instructors. A North Vietnamese-backed communist insurrection began as early as 1949. Invading during the opium harvest season of 1953, it settled in northeastern Laos adjacent to the border of the Democratic Republic of Vietnam.

As the Laotian Civil War flared, the Central Intelligence Agency established a secret guerrilla army in the Plain of Jars. Interposed between the communist settlement around Xam Neua and the Royal Lao Government in Vientiane, the Hmong military irregulars fought to hold on to their traditional territory, and to preserve Laos. After the failure and defeat of Operation Pigfat, the communists had overrun the Plain of Jars to within ten kilometers of the guerrillas' main base at Long Chieng. They were poised to turn the Hmong army's western flank.

== Background ==
Facing an enemy drive that had penetrated within ten kilometers of his main base by the disastrous end of Operation Pigfat, as well as menacing his major air strip at Muang Soui, Hmong General Vang Pao and his CIA backers had fought back. An aerial campaign, Operation Raindance, had sapped enemy strength by its massive destruction of his pre-positioned supplies. However, after it and the following Operation Stranglehold ended, the Hmong guerrillas had swept through enemy ground back to their own territory. It seemed a somewhat successful end to their dry season operations.

As Vang Pao planned a rainy season offensive during late June 1969, the People's Army of Vietnam anticipated him. In its first rainy season offensive of the Laotian Civil War, as well as its first use of tanks in northern Laos, the communists captured Muang Soui on 27 June in Campaign Thoan Thang. Making the threat more serious was the addition of seven fresh communist battalions during the past two months. That brought the total PAVN order of battle opposing Vang Pao to an unprecedented 19 battalions.

== Operation Off Balance ==
On 28 June 1969, Vang Pao began planning another preemptive attack on the communists in hopes of catching them by surprise; it would be launched three days later on 1 July. The Hmong general proposed rallying the 700 Forces Armées Neutralistes soldiers at Xieng Dat who had fled there from Muang Soui. He would stiffen their will to fight by assigning a couple of battalions of his guerrillas to the operation, some 600 Hmong. Also available was a Royal Lao Army paratroop battalion of 300; the paratroopers were considered the best of the regular troops. With half of the 120 daily Operation Barrel Roll air strike sorties pledged for support, the pincer movement on the ground was supposed to recapture the vital all-weather fighter strip at Muang Soui in ten days.

On 29 June, a CIA case officer flew in to Xieng Dat to appraise the combat effectiveness of the Neutralists. He met with a sullen commanding officer, Colonel Sing, who reported the desertion of 50 soldiers the previous night, and claimed to be short of weaponry. On the other hand, when the case officer moved on to the Hmong, the CIA man found Vang Pao personally firing a 4.2 inch mortar at the enemy. The inspection tour left serious doubts as to whether the Hmong had sufficient military power to tackle an offensive by themselves. To further complicate matters, Vang Pao and the Neutralists loathed one another.

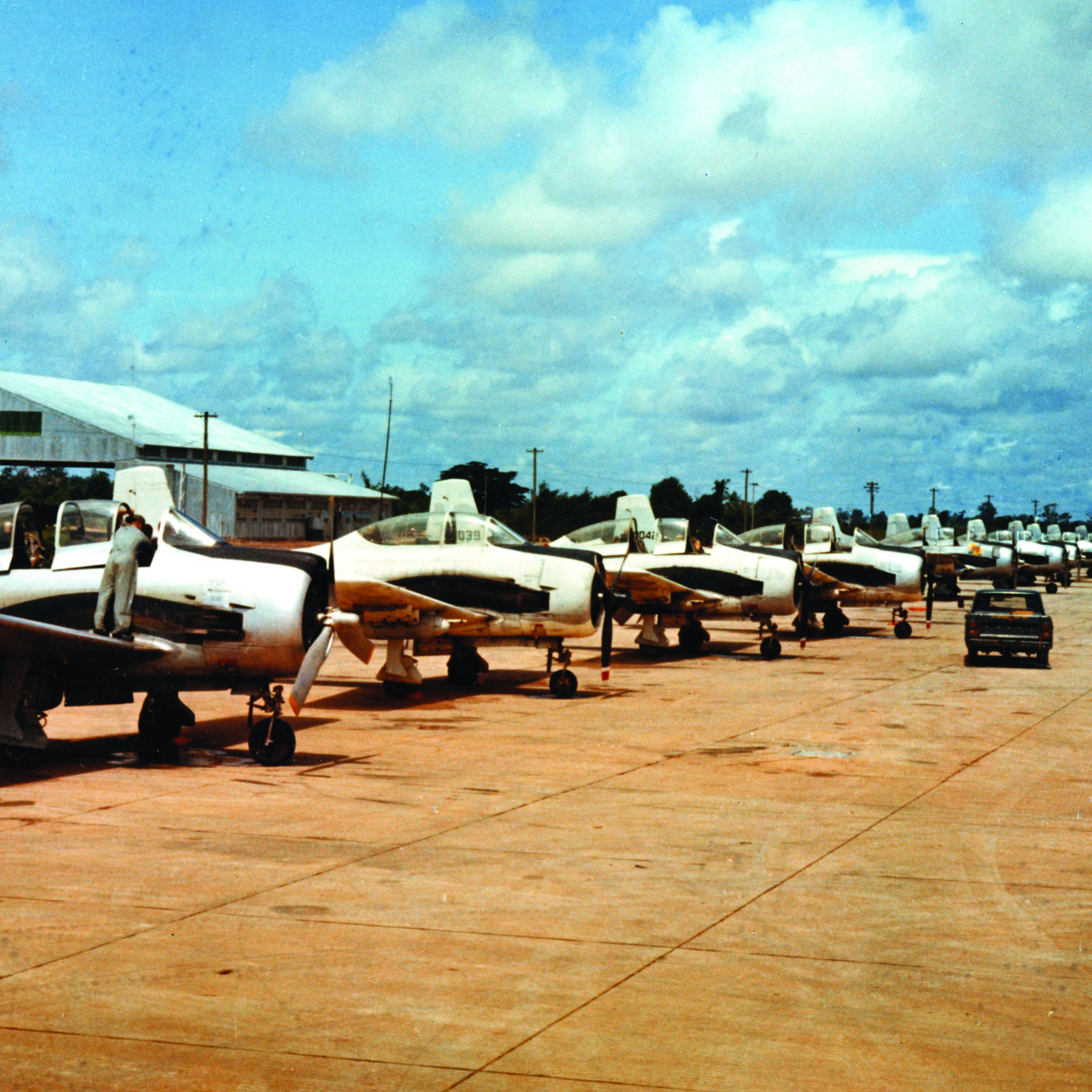
T-28Ds of the Royal Lao Air Force, used in Operation Barrel Roll in the Kingdom of Laos

Nevertheless, dubbed Operation Off Balance, the plan tried to live up to its name by kicking off hurriedly on 1 July 1969, three days after it was proposed. The Hmong Bataillon Guerrier 206 (Warrior Battalion 206) was helilifted to a landing zone at the old Operation Momentum base at San Luang. They moved out on foot northeastward toward the objective. Neutralist Bataillon Commando 208 (Commando Battalion 208), which had been regrouped at Xieng Dat after their flight from Muang Soui, marched eastward to join that column. In a separate move, the paratroop battalion, 101 Bataillon de Parachutistes (101st Parachute Battalion), was helicoptered to Ban Na, southeast of the objective, to begin their approach march. In a third part of the operation, the Hmong Bataillon Guerrier 201 (Warrior Battalion 201) paired with the Neutralist Bataillon d'Infanterie 15 (Battalion of Infantry 15); they were helicoptered to Phou So to walk south to Muang Soui.

On 1 July, the U.S. Air Force struck the communists at Muang Soui with 50 sorties of tactical air strikes. Their bomb damage assessment was 18 secondary explosions from munitions, 12 fires set, and 39 bunkers destroyed. Weather grounded the aircraft on 2 July. On 3 July, they got through for 24 sorties. They were grounded again on 4 July.

Neutralist Bataillon d'Infanterie 15 refused to participate in the operation. That left the Hmong Bataillon Guerrier 206 alone in its advance from the north. The other Neutralist unit, Bataillon Commando 208, was scarcely any more aggressive. However, the other Hmong in Bataillon Guerrier 201 and the Royalist paratroopers advanced. On 5 July, as 30 sorties each of USAF and RLAF air struck the communists, Hmong guerrillas were only five kilometers from the airfield. However, at least two PAVN battalions still blocked them. Meanwhile, pilots and road watch reconnaissance teams reported a steady flow of reinforcement from North Vietnam; they had counted eight more tanks incoming, as well as 1,000 trucks.

For several days, flying weather once again turned foul; only on 8 July did air power hit, and then with only six missions. On 11 July, a Neutralist unit finally made a decisive move—Bataillon Commando 208 moved away from Muang Soui. At that, Operation Off Balance was effectively ended.

That was far from the worst news on 11 July. Vang Pao's kinsman, the famed Hmong RLAF pilot Lee Lue, was killed by anti-aircraft fire. At the time of his death, he had flown over 5,000 battle missions—arguably the most combat sorties of any fighter pilot in history.

The communists counter-attacked on 13 July, using both tanks and heavy artillery. Lacking air support to support their resistance, the Hmong guerrillas dropped back into defensive positions. On 15 July, Vang Pao called off Operation Off Balance.

== Aftermath ==
=== Lee Lue's funeral ===
Lee Lue was the survivor of the first two Hmong pilots trained. His reputation as a warrior had even spread within the American fighter pilot community. Daily, weather permitting, he flew combat whether healthy or ill. He had become an important symbol to the Hmong resistance. Commonly, when he landed at the end of a day's combat, he would be so weary he would be carefully lifted from the cockpit by his ground crew.

The communists fully appreciated his significance; they celebrated with impromptu fireworks as his plane crashed. His death so stunned the Royalists that the Royal Lao Armed Forces generals actually flew to the front in Military Region 2 to pay their respects at the three-day funeral. The ceremony was an amalgam of Hmong animist and Lao Buddhist beliefs. Air Attache Colonel Robert Tyrrell laid an American Distinguished Flying Cross on Lee Lue's coffin before his interment. Raven FACs stationed at Long Tieng also joined the ceremony. Karl Polifka stated, "Lee Lue was one of only two people I have shed tears over in my Air Force career." Another Raven, Mike Cavanaugh, considered Lee Lue his brother.

=== Bombing of Khang Khai ===
Lao Prime Minister Souvanna Phouma had been greatly perturbed by the loss of Muang Soui to the communists. As planning for Off Balance went forward, he decided to remove the ban on bombing Khang Khai. He stumped for 150 air strikes to attack on 1 July as a means of showing his wrath. He also requested 150 more sorties the following day. This request to Seventh Air Force was passed back to Washington, DC for approval. It arrived there on a weekend, and was mishandled by junior staff on duty. When more senior officials returned to work on Monday, they disapproved the request as being an unnecessary escalation of the war, especially since there was a Chinese cultural mission in Khang Kai. The American ambassador in Vientiane, G. McMurtrie Godley, was also cautioned about allowing the RLAF to bomb Khang Khai, for fear of provoking the Chinese communists. The entire subject was slated for discussion at an upcoming rules of engagement on 11 August.

While this was in progress, in early August, a Raven Forward Air Controller directed an air strike using a laser-guided bomb on a communist radio station on the outskirts of Khang Khai. An errant cloud misguided the bomb; it struck the Chinese cultural mission. The resulting explosion of stored munitions leveled everything within a quarter mile, including the broadcast equipment. Much to the U.S. State Department's surprise, there was no subsequent complaint from the Chinese about the bombing.

=== On the ground ===
After Lee Lue's funeral, the Hmong guerrillas withdrew to Long Tieng. The Royalist 101 Bataillon de Parachutistes were helilifted to a defensive position at Ban Na. On 10 August 1969, PAVN troops overran Xieng Dat, scattering the Neutralists. After the remnants of the Neutralist unit were regathered at Muong Kassy, they were airlifted to Thailand for retraining. The communists still controlled the Plain of Jars. They had escalated their offensive power with tanks; to that they added seven fresh infantry battalions.

Vang Pao was left with an internal problem in his community. Hmong clan leaders who were demoralized by losses lobbied for withdrawal of the Hmong community westward out of the war.
