= Pathet Lao =

1950–1975 left-wing national liberation movement of Laos

- Flag
- Leaders: Prince Souphanouvong; Kaysone Phomvihane; Nouhak Phoumsavanh
- Dates active: 1950 – 2 December 1975
- Headquarters: Vientiane
- Ideology: Communism

The Pathet Lao (Lao: ປະເທດລາວ, romanized: Pa thēt Lāo, lit. 'Lao Nation'), officially the Lao People's Liberation Army, was a communist political movement and organization in Laos, formed in the 20th century. It ultimately gained control over the entire country of Laos in 1975, after the Laotian Civil War. The Pathet Lao were associated and dependent on Vietnamese communists and North Vietnam since their foundation, with the group being established after advice from Hanoi to create a Laotian counterpart of the Viet Minh or Viet Cong. During the civil war, it was effectively organised, equipped and led by the People's Army of Vietnam (PAVN). They fought against the anti-communist forces in the Vietnam War. Eventually, the term became the generic name for Laotian communists.

== History ==
=== 1940s and 1950s ===
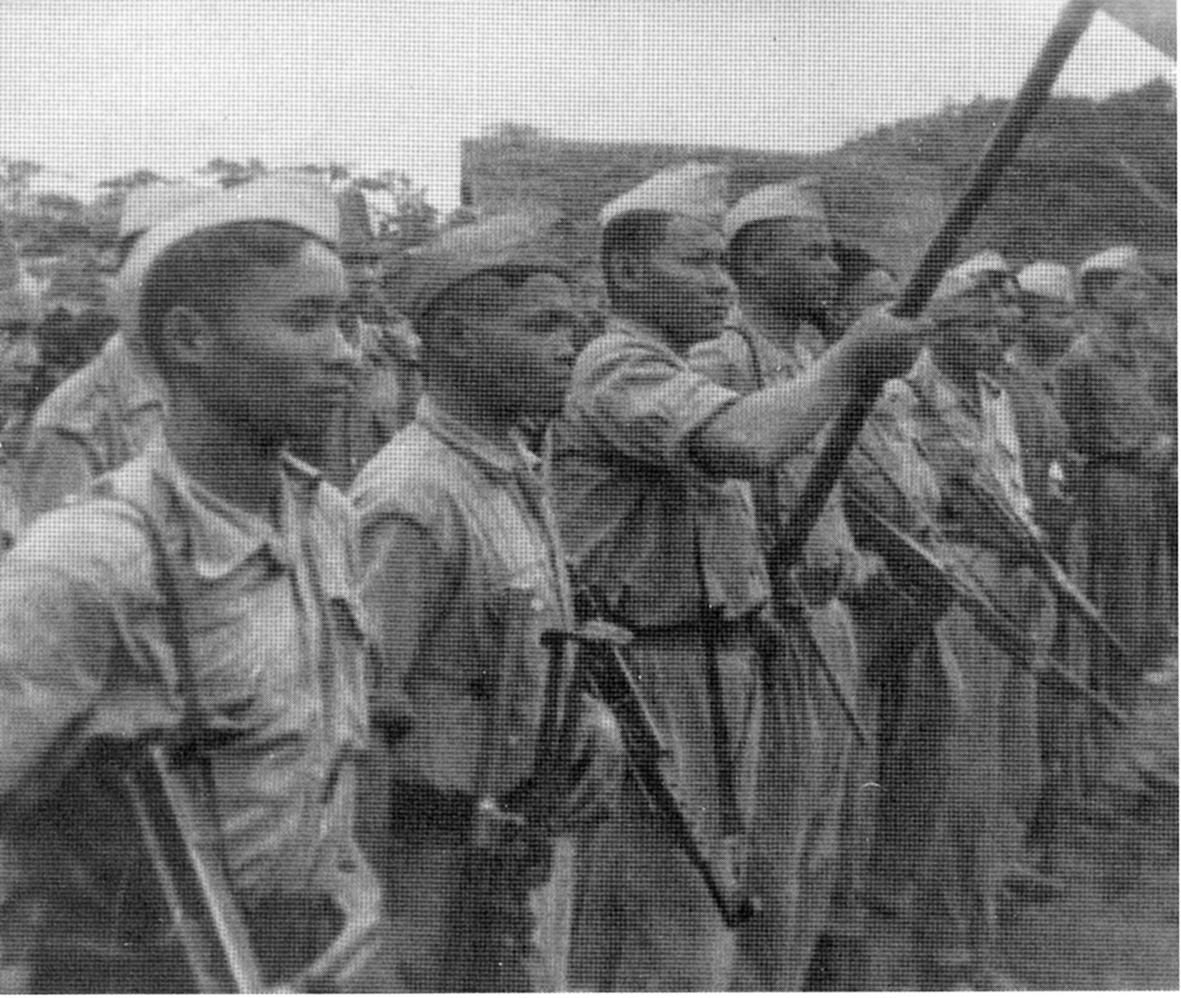
Pathet Lao at Xam Neua in 1953

The organization can trace its roots from the Second World War, similar to the Khmer Issarak in Cambodia and the Viet Minh in Vietnam. Originally the Lao Issara, an anti-French, non-communist nationalist movement formed on 12 October 1945, it was renamed the "Pathet Lao" in 1950 when it was adopted by Lao forces under Souphanouvong, who joined the Viet Minh's revolt against colonial French authorities in Indochina during the First Indochina War.

Souphanouvong spent seven years in Nha Trang and 16 years in Vietnam. In August 1950, Souphanouvong joined the Viet Minh in their headquarters north of Hanoi, and became the head of the Pathet Lao, along with its political arm dubbed "Neo Lao Issara" (Free Lao Front).

In 1953, Pathet Lao fighters accompanied an invasion of Laos from Vietnam led by Viet Minh forces; they established a government at Viengxay in Houaphanh province, northeast Laos.

The 1954 Geneva Conference agreements required the withdrawal of foreign forces, and allowed the Pathet Lao to establish itself as a regime in Laos's two northern provinces. The Viet Minh and North Vietnamese never really withdrew from the border areas of Laos and the Pathet Lao continued to operate almost as a branch organization of the Viet Minh. Two months after the conference, the North Vietnamese formed Group 100 with headquarters at Na Mèo.

A coalition government was established in 1957 between the monarchists and communists. In May 1959 two Pathet Lao battalions which had been selected for integration into the Royal Lao Army (RLA) were surrounded by RLA troops who attempted to disarm them. Part of one battalion was captured but the remainder fled to North Vietnam. Then in July 1959 Lao police arrested 16 Neo Lao Hak Sat members, including seven who had been elected to the National Assembly, on charges of treason. These actions brought about a resumption of fighting.

=== 1959 to 1975 ===
In 1959, North Vietnam had reoccupied areas of eastern Laos. The area was used as a transit route for men and supplies destined for the Viet Cong insurgency in South Vietnam which became known as the Ho Chi Minh trail. In September 1959, North Vietnam formed Group 959 in Laos with the aim of securing the supply route to South Vietnam and building the Pathet Lao into a stronger counterforce against the Lao Royal government. Group 959 openly supplied, trained and militarily supported the Pathet Lao. The typical strategy during this era was for PAVN regulars to attack first and then send in the Pathet Lao at the end of the battle to claim victory.

In the 1960s, more attempts at neutrality agreements and coalition government were attempted, principally the International Agreement on the Neutrality of Laos signed in Geneva on 23 July 1962, and as North Vietnam had no intention of withdrawing from Laos, these agreements failed. The Pathet Lao entered into another coalition government in June 1962 and by April 1963 the Pathet Lao abandoned the coalition and resumed fighting.

Until 1968 military operations were conducted by units usually of company or at most battalion size. Typically the RLA would be dominant in the wet season from May through October when the PAVN/Pathet Lao were immobilized by the rains and the PAVN/Pathet Lao would dominate during the dry season from November through April. PAVN forces in Laos were primarily focused on supporting and defending the Ho Chi Minh trail, with support for the Pathet Lao revolution as a secondary role. In 1968 of the estimated 40,000 PAVN troops in Laos, 25,000 were engaged in supporting the Trail, 700 as advisers to the Pathet Lao and the remainder in mobile units supporting Pathet Lao operations. Publicly the North Vietnamese maintained that they did not have any troops in Laos and were respecting the Geneva Agreement, while the United States and its allies were violating it; the United States asserted the exact opposite.

The Pathet Lao supreme headquarters or center was located in the Viengxay Caves near Xam Neua manned by approximately 500 personnel. NLHS membership was estimated as being 11,000 in 1965 and 14,000 in 1978.

In October 1965 the armed forces were renamed the Lao People's Liberation Army (LPLA). The LPLA's estimated strength was 25,000 in June 1965, 33,000 in April 1967, 48,000+ in 1970 and 35,000 in late 1972. The LPLA was divided into regular, regional/popular and militia/guerrilla forces. LPLA forces had PAVN advisers assigned to them and were not mixed with PAVN forces. Recruitment into the LPLA was based on appeals to the patriotism of young Laotians who were told that their country was rich in natural resources and the people were poor because of capitalism and US imperialism. If volunteers were not forthcoming then youth would be drafted, with the draft age of 15, and in some cases conscripts were as young as 12. Training was rudimentary with a greater emphasis placed on political indoctrination than on military skills as the "fighting will" was deemed to be the most important source of military strength. Military units had political commissars down to company level. The LPLA were entirely dependent on the PAVN for the supply of weapons and munitions and were generally outgunned by the RLA.

Under orders from Mao Zedong, the People's Liberation Army provided 115,000 guns, 920,000 grenades and 170 million bullets, and trained more than 700 of its military officers.

In May 1968, the PAVN launched a multi-division invasion of Laos. The Pathet Lao effectively served as an auxiliary force to the PAVN. In June 1969 the PAVN/Pathet Lao launched Campaign Toan Thang, their first wet season offensive. While US air bombardments contributed to the majority of PAVN/Pathet casualties, the RLA were unable to match the numerical strength of the PAVN/Pathet Lao forces.

On 2 February 1971 the PAVN/Pathet Lao launched Campaign 74B temporarily capturing the Plain of Jars and shelling Long Tieng, the base of Vang Pao's RLA aligned army before withdrawing. On 28 October 1972 the PAVN/Pathet Lao launched Campaign 972 scoring a series of victories over the RLA forces.

With the signing of the Paris Peace Accords on 27 January 1973 all U.S. prisoners were to be released under Operation Homecoming. The United States Department of Defense (DOD) listed 311 Americans as missing in Laos, and on 1 February 1973 the North Vietnamese handed the Americans a list of prisoners of war in Laos which included nine Americans: seven servicemen and two civilians. U.S. agencies believe that as many as 41 Americans may have been held prisoner by the Pathet Lao. Charles Shelton who was captured on 29 April 1965 was listed as a prisoner by the DOD until September 1994. As of 26 July 2019 the DOD's Defense POW/MIA Accounting Agency listed 286 Americans as missing in Laos, of which 263 were classified as further pursuit, 12 deferred and 11 non-recoverable.

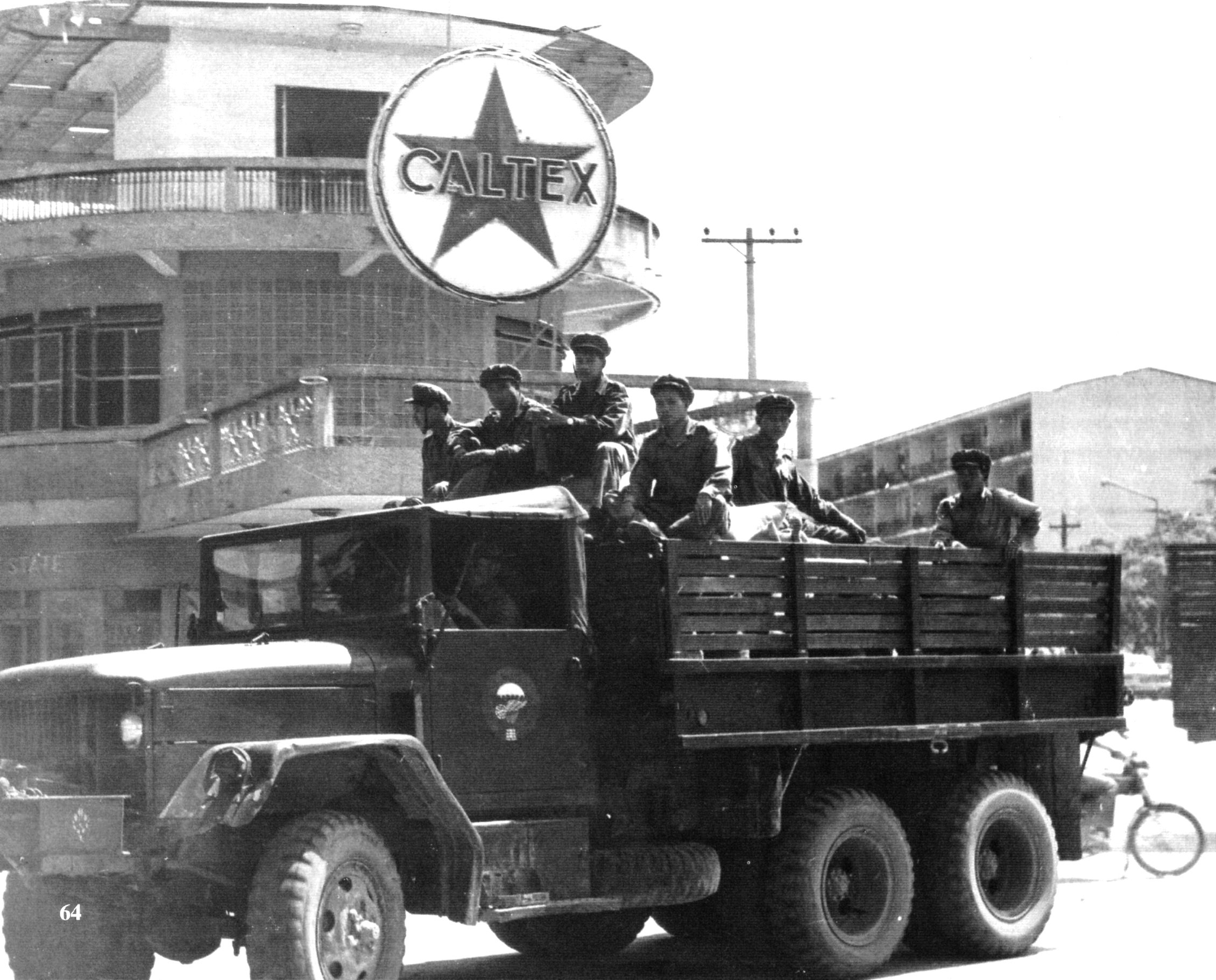
Pathet Lao soldiers in Vientiane, Laos, 1973

After the Paris Peace Accords ended U.S. involvement in the Vietnam War, the Pathet Lao and the government of Laos signed a cease-fire agreement, the Vientiane Treaty, on 21 February 1973.

On 14 December 1974, the Pathet Lao killed Charles Dean and Neil Sharman, backpackers who were captured near Vientiane.
