= Xam Neua =

Xam Neua ເມືອງຊຳເໜືອ Sam Neua or Samneua
- District & municipality
- Xam Neua District
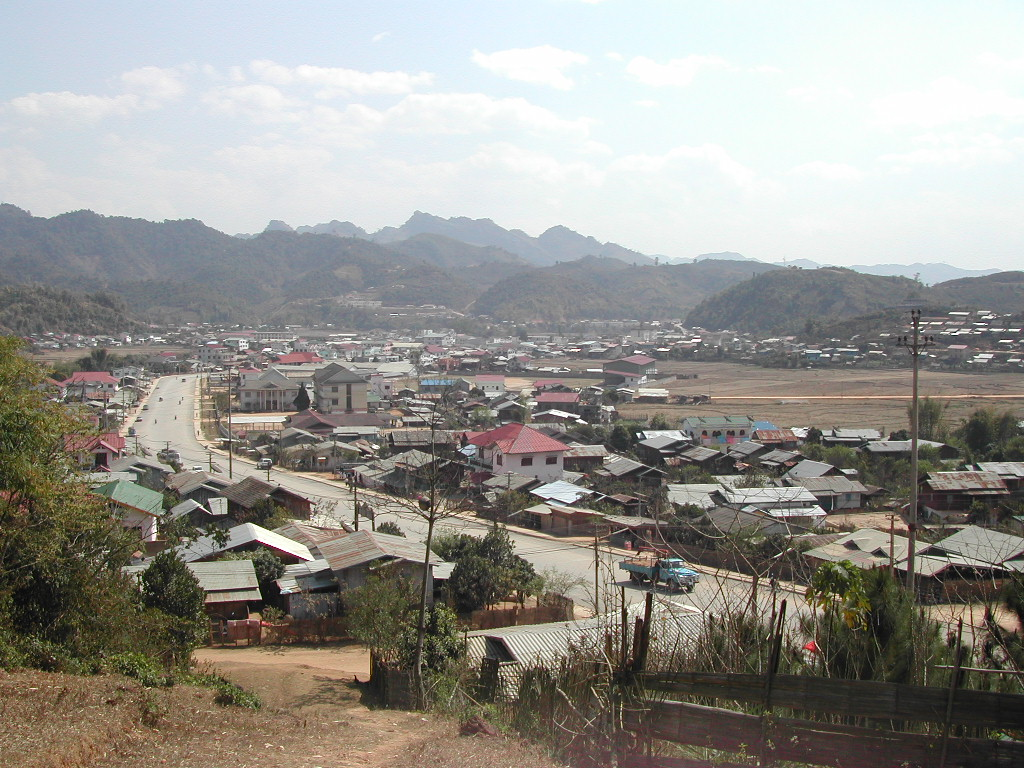

- Location in Laos
- Coordinates: 20.415°N 104.048°E
- Country: Laos
- Admin. division: Houaphanh Province

Population (2015)
  - Total: 56,900
  - Religions: Buddhism
- Time zone: UTC+7 (ICT)

Xam Neua (Lao: ຊຳເໜືອ, romanized: Sam Nư̄a, pronounced [sám nɯ̌a], sometimes transcribed as Sam Nuea or Samneua, literally 'northern swamp'; French: Xam-Nua), is the capital of Houaphanh Province, Laos.

== History ==
After fleeing from Phrae, deposed king Phiriya Thepphawong escaped from Northern Thailand to Luang Prabang, residing in Xam Neua from 1903-1909.

== Climate ==
Climate data for Xam Neua, elevation 1,000 m (3,300 ft), (1990–2019 normals, extremes 2002–2025)
Month	Jan	Feb	Mar	Apr	May	Jun	Jul	Aug	Sep	Oct	Nov	Dec	Year
Record high °C (°F)	30.8 (87.4)	34.0 (93.2)	37.6 (99.7)	38.2 (100.8)	37.5 (99.5)	36.0 (96.8)	36.8 (98.2)	33.9 (93.0)	34.0 (93.2)	32.0 (89.6)	32.4 (90.3)	32.0 (89.6)	38.2 (100.8)
Mean daily maximum °C (°F)	20.3 (68.5)	22.9 (73.2)	26.2 (79.2)	28.6 (83.5)	29.1 (84.4)	29.1 (84.4)	28.7 (83.7)	28.3 (82.9)	27.2 (81.0)	24.9 (76.8)	23.0 (73.4)	20.0 (68.0)	25.7 (78.2)
Daily mean °C (°F)	15.0 (59.0)	16.8 (62.2)	19.9 (67.8)	22.7 (72.9)	24.2 (75.6)	24.9 (76.8)	24.7 (76.5)	24.4 (75.9)	23.2 (73.8)	21.1 (70.0)	18.4 (65.1)	15.2 (59.4)	20.9 (69.6)
Mean daily minimum °C (°F)	9.7 (49.5)	10.7 (51.3)	13.5 (56.3)	16.8 (62.2)	19.2 (66.6)	20.7 (69.3)	20.7 (69.3)	20.4 (68.7)	19.2 (66.6)	17.2 (63.0)	13.8 (56.8)	10.4 (50.7)	16.0 (60.9)
Record low °C (°F)	−1.1 (30.0)	0.2 (32.4)	3.6 (38.5)	7.9 (46.2)	7.0 (44.6)	13.5 (56.3)	16.5 (61.7)	15.0 (59.0)	10.9 (51.6)	8.4 (47.1)	2.0 (35.6)	−0.4 (31.3)	−1.1 (30.0)
Average precipitation mm (inches)	20 (0.8)	8 (0.3)	47 (1.9)	111 (4.4)	190 (7.5)	198 (7.8)	283 (11.1)	284 (11.2)	210 (8.3)	95 (3.7)	28 (1.1)	13 (0.5)	1,487 (58.6)
Average precipitation days (≥ 1.0 mm)	2.1	1.1	4.7	8.6	11.2	10.6	14.9	15.6	10.5	7.2	2.7	1.8	91
Average relative humidity (%)	79.4	75.1	73.1	71.6	72.9	73.0	78.3	79.9	80.3	81.3	79.9	79.3	77.0
Source 1: Food and Agriculture Organization of the United Nations
Source 2: Meteomanz (precipitation days 2002–2020)SeaDelt (humidity 2016–2022)

== Daily life ==
It is said that there is a communist re-education camp in Xam Neua and that it was the Pathet Lao capital during the Laotian Civil War Battle of Lima Site 85 (LS-85), 11 March 1968. It is near the Pathet Lao refuges in the Viengxay Caves, which the Lao government hopes to promote as a tourism destination similar to the Củ Chi tunnels near Ho Chi Minh City in Vietnam and the Killing Fields Memorial near Phnom Penh in Cambodia. It is near Nam Et-Phou Louey National Protected Area (pronounced "naam et poo loo-ee").

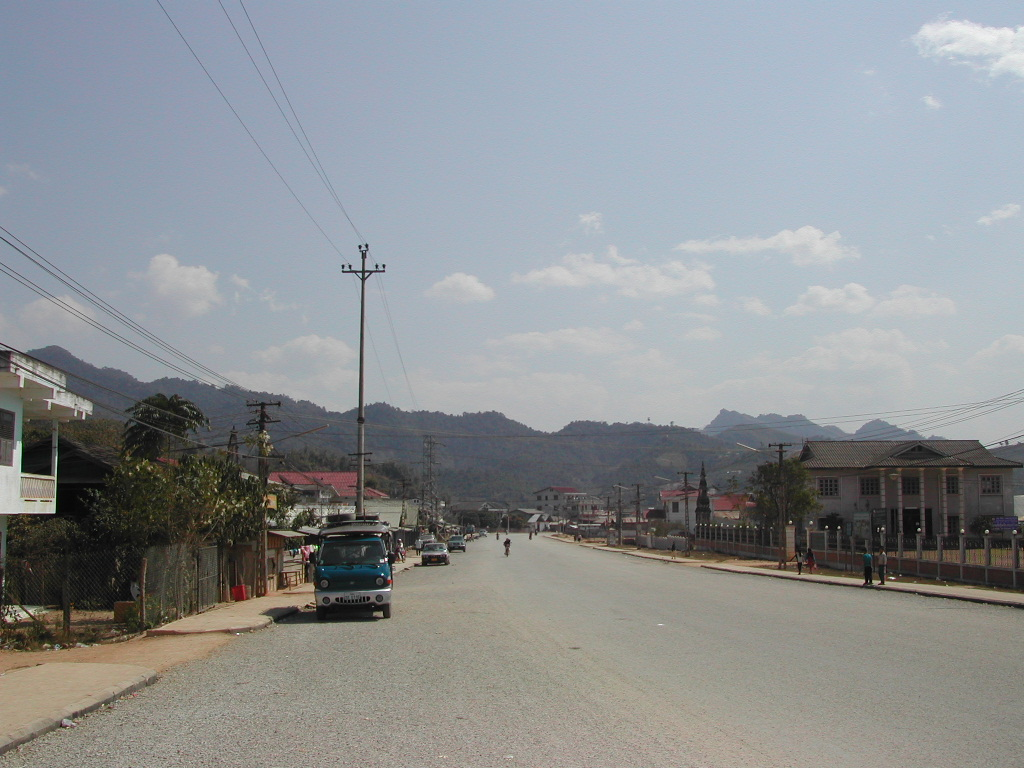
Sam Neua's main street

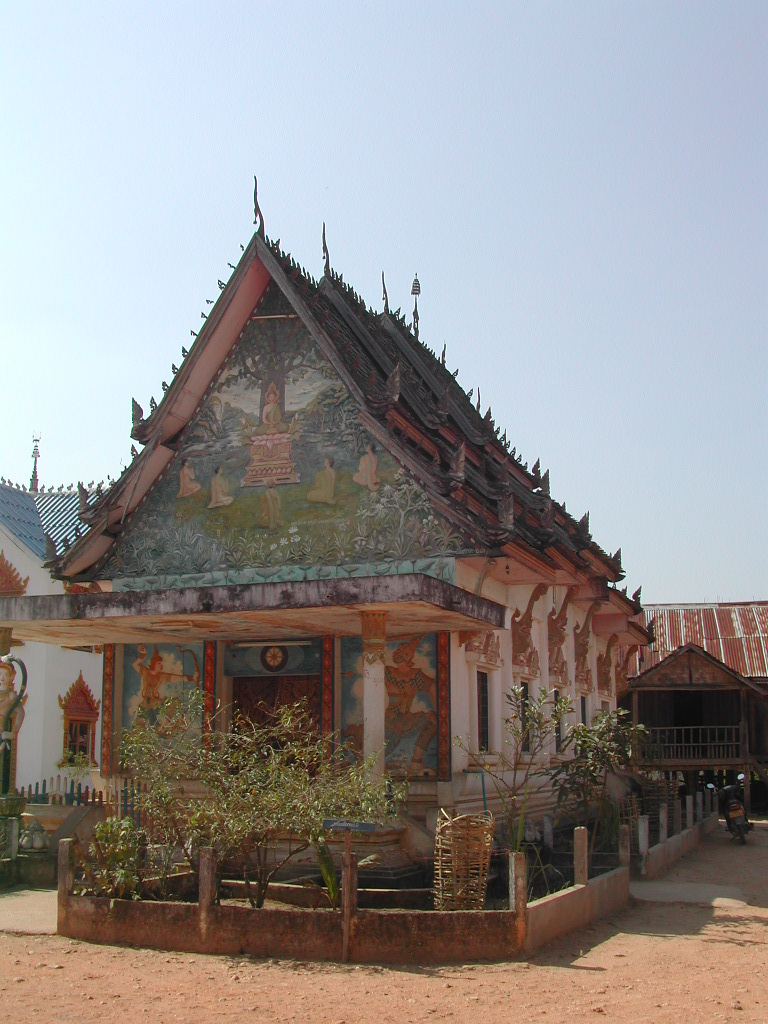
Wat Pho Xai

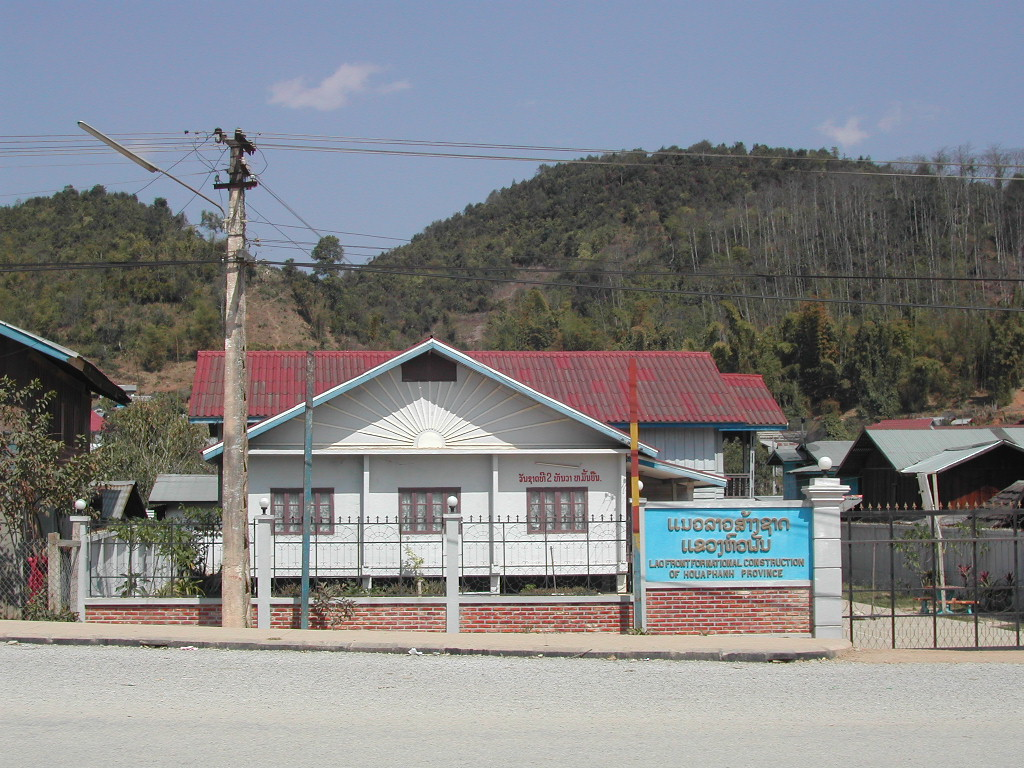
Lao Front for National Construction building, Xam Neua

== See also ==
- Independence Monument, Xam Neua
