= Battles of Bouamlong =

Series of battles in the Laotian Civil War

Map showing location of Bouamlong valley in Laos

The Battles of Bouamlong came about because the valley of Bouamlong (also spelled "Bouam Long" or "Boaum Lung") was a center of Royalist guerrilla operations during the Laotian Civil War. Located well into Communist-held territory and maintained by an air bridge, on several occasions Bouamlong served as a launching point for Royalist offensives such as Operation Raindance, Kou Kiet, Operation Counterpunch III, and Operation Strength. It was also targeted for attack by offensives by the People's Army of Vietnam during Campaign 139 and Campaign 74B. Defended by Auto Defense Choc troops led by Major Cher Pao Moua, Bouamlong held out against the Communist forces even after the War ended in a ceasefire in February 1973. There were reports of resistance into the 1990s.

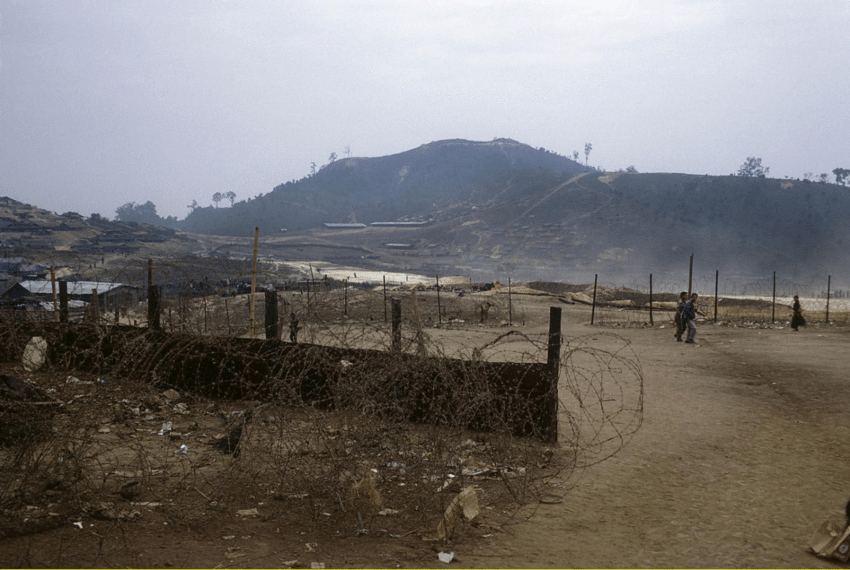
Barbed wire fencing around a Hmong outpost in Bouamlong valley (1971)

== Overview ==
Beginning in 1946, France fought the Viet Minh insurrection in French Indochina, including the Kingdom of Laos. When it lost that war, Laotian neutrality was established in the 1954 Geneva Agreements. When France withdrew most of its military in conformity with the treaty, the United States filled the vacuum with purportedly civilian paramilitary instructors. A North Vietnamese-backed communist invaded during the opium harvest season of 1953. It settled in northeastern Laos adjacent to the border of the Democratic Republic of Vietnam.

As the Laotian Civil War began, the Central Intelligence Agency established a secret guerrilla army in the Plain of Jars to oppose this insurgency. This army of Hmong military irregulars fought the communists in defense of their traditional territory in Laos. A force of 500 Hmong guerrillas began training at Bouamlong in December 1961, as it became one of the Royalist outposts scattered in and around the Plain of Jars. Over the next few months, the Project Momentum program would progress to training the guerrillas as Special Guerrilla Units for offensive operations.

Commanded by a doughty veteran Hmong officer, Major Cher Pao Moua, the fortified village was garrisoned by its few hundred Auto Defense Choc (ADC) militia. Bouamlong was one of the few guerrilla bases that would not be captured by the Communists at some time during the Laotian Civil War. Topography favored Bouamlong by making it easily defensible. It lay in a valley encircled by three mountains; the peaks were fortified. By 1969, Bouamlong's population fostered a commercially sized opium poppy operation; however, bulk shipments of opium via Air America and Continental Air Services Inc were prohibited by the CIA. Nevertheless, the CIA believed that Hmong protectiveness of the opium bolstered their stubborn opposition to the Communists.

== Battles of Nakhang; Operation Raindance ==
As nearby Nakhang fell and the Royalist Operation Raindance neared its end, the Communist Pathet Lao and PAVN 148th Regiment attacked Bouamlong. Two CIA case officers flew in to aid in Bouamlong's defense in early March, as the 148th began a push. On 12 March 1969, two U.S. Air Force AC-47 gunships were deployed to support the besieged outpost. On the 15th, three more gunships were added to the close air support effort. On the 20th, the Communists launched their heaviest unsuccessful attack yet, only to suffer an estimated 175 casualties from AC-47 fire. Overall, the three Pathet Lao battalions were rendered combat ineffective, and the assault dwindled away. As Raindance ended, the Bouamlong guerrillas tried to cut the Communist supply Route 7 with little success. However, their accompanying supportive air strikes inflicted heavy damage on the Communists. Despite this repulse, the Communists would try again in May.

== Kou Kiet; Campaign 139 ==
Boumalong would become a Royalist base for one of the attacking columns during the Kou Kiet offensive launched during early August 1969. Its guerrillas would join the monarchist attack during that operation. As the Communists countered with Campaign 139, the PAVN 141st Regiment would attack Bouamlong.

As the PAVN main force laid siege to Long Tieng and Sam Thong, a smaller column branched off to attack Bouamlong on 23 February 1970. The PAVN regulars almost overran the ADC irregulars, as they came up against the perimeter wire. The communists besieged Bouamlong until defoliant cleared the cover from the militia position's perimeter on 6 March. The siege eased for a fortnight. Then, in early April, fresh assailants arrived—the 141st Regiment of the 312th Division. On 10 April 1970, they overran the outlying outpost of Phou Then seven kilometers southwest of Bouamlong. On 13 April, the PAVN threw a heavy barrage of artillery fire at Bouamlong while Dac Cong sappers tunneled into its inner perimeter. The sappers emerged from their tunnels to momentarily overwhelm some startled militia, but were unsuccessful in carrying the position. The siege continued.

By early May, the Bouamlong fortifications had deteriorated into a military slum. The ADC militia, being home guards, had their families there with them. In total, there were almost 6,000 Hmong crowded onto the valley floor. The area was littered with castoff parachutes and other military debris. The stink of rotting Vietnamese corpses permeated the atmosphere. An improvised Royal Lao Army (RLA) battalion of 435 soldiers, composed of units plucked from other battalions, was airlifted into this. Four days later, 116 of its troopers quit and were evacuated. On 24 May, Bataillon Commando 205 (BC 205) was choppered in to replace the makeshift battalion; on the return trips, the departing troops were flown out. On 29 May, the newcomers moved out toward Phou Then. Air strikes by Royal Lao Air Force (RLAF) T-28s and U.S. Air Force A-1s cleared their way in daylight. At night, AC-47 gunships provided defensive fire. A freshly arrived 105mm howitzer lent additional fire support. By 18 June, the outpost had been retaken, and the drive ended.

== Operation Counterpunch III ==
On 26 November 1970, Bouamlong was one of the departure points for one of the Royalist assaults of Operation Counterpunch III.

== Campaign 74B ==
At the start of May 1971, the Communists withdrew at the end of Campaign 74B; in the process, units of the battle-hardened PAVN 316th Division attacked Bouamlong from three sides. Pressing in from the north, east, and southwest, the Communists struck with artillery, mortar, and recoilless rifle fire. Sappers attacked the Hmong defenders; the Communists even resorted to tear gas. However, the Hmong manned three 105mm howitzers for counterfire. They also used ground beacons to direct gunship strikes against the attackers. The Vietnamese gave up the siege at the end of May and left. Three Pathet Lao battalions remained to monitor the situation.

On 18 June, Bouamlong's commanding officer, Cher Pao Moua, was wounded and temporarily medically evacuated.

At the end of July, the Bouamlong guerrillas staged a diversionary attack on the Communist Route 72 supply line. However, in early August, the guerrillas were overrun by a Communist counter-assault.

== Operation Strength ==
By 6 February 1972, the militia garrison at Bouamlong had been organized as a regiment—Groupement Mobile 27 (GM 27). Once again, Bouamlong served as a launch site for a Royalist offensive as they once again tried to interdict Communist logistics. They were a key part of the diversion that drew 11 Communist battalions from attacking Long Tieng. After withdrawing from the pursuing Communists, GM 27 was scheduled to again take the offensive in Operation Strength II on 6 March. However, reinforcements being flown in to beef up the attack mutinied. Such reinforcements as did arrive struck south towards the Routes 7/71 road junction. By 30 March, GM 27 joined them in their overlook of the highways.

== Aftermath ==
When it became apparent the war was coming to an end, Bouamlong set up a sawmill to spark a local economy.

Bouamlong would continue its armed resistance for years after the ceasefire ended the Laotian Civil War in February 1973. They were still holding out into the 1990s.
