= Xaisomboun =

Xaisomboun (Lao: ໄຊສົມບູນ) may refer to:

- Special Zone of Xaisomboun, a special zone (khetphiset) of Laos dissolved in 2006
- Xaisomboun Province, a new province of Laos since 2014
