= Operation Strength =

Operation Strength was the codename for several military operations in the 20th century

It can refer to:

- Operation Strength (1941), an aircraft reinforcement mission in the Arctic campaign of the Second World War.
- Operation Strength (1972) (6 February – 17 March 1972) was a Royalist military offensive of the Laotian Civil War.
- Operation Strength II (6–31 March 1972) was a Royalist military offensive of the Laotian Civil War. A follow-up to Strength I.
