= Communist takeover of Laos =

1975 event

- Part of Laotian Civil War
Date	14 April 1975 – 2 December 1975
Location	Laos
Result	Pathet Lao and North Vietnamese victory

Belligerents
(Laos) Pathet Lao; North Vietnam	Kingdom of Laos; United States; Thailand

Commanders and leaders
(Laos) Souphanouvong (Laos) Kaysone Phomvihane (North Vietnam) Lê Duẩn	(Kingdom of Laos) Savang Vatthana (Kingdom of Laos) Oudone Sananikone (AWOL) (Kingdom of Laos) Kouprasith Abhay (AWOL) (Kingdom of Laos) Vang Pao (United States) Gerald Ford (Thailand) Kukrit Pramoj

Casualties and losses
Between 30,000-40,000 Hmong soldiers had been killed in combat and between 2,500-3,000 were missing in action in the end of the war	
- 300,000+ people displaced

The Communist takeover of Laos was culminated by a final offensive launched by Pathet Lao forces supported by the North Vietnamese Army in April 1975 that resulted in the proclamation of the Lao People's Democratic Republic on 2 December 1975.

== Background ==
The U.S. pulled out of Laos in 1973, as stipulated by the Paris Peace Accords. Thailand likewise began to withdraw its troops from Laos following the signing of the Paris Accords. North Vietnam was not required to remove its forces under the terms of the treaty.

The national government was forced to accept the Pathet Lao into the government. During 1974 and 1975 the balance of power in Laos shifted steadily in favour of the Pathēt Lao as the U.S. disengaged itself from Indochina. Prime Minister Souvanna Phouma was tired and demoralised, and following a heart attack in mid-1974 he spent some months recuperating in France, after which he announced that he would retire from politics following the elections scheduled for early 1976.

The anti-communist forces were thus leaderless, and also divided and deeply mired in corruption. Prince Souphanouvong, by contrast, was confident and a master political tactician, and had behind him the disciplined cadres of the communist party and the Pathēt Lao forces and the North Vietnamese army. The end of American aid also meant the mass demobilization of most of the non-Pathēt Lao military forces in the country. The Pathēt Lao on the other hand continued to be both funded and equipped by North Vietnam.

In May 1974 put forward an 18-point plan for "National Reconstruction", which was unanimously adopted – a sign of his increasing dominance. The plan was mostly uncontroversial, with renewed promises of free elections, democratic rights and respect for religion, as well as constructive economic policies. But press censorship was introduced in the name of "national unity", making it more difficult for non-communist forces to organise politically in response to the creeping Pathēt Lao takeover. In January 1975 all public meetings and demonstrations were banned. Recognising the trend of events, influential business and political figures began to move their assets, and in some cases themselves, to Thailand, France or the U.S.

== Beginning of the offensive ==
=== Advance on Vientiane ===
On 14th April, heavy fighting erupted near Sala Phou Khoun with the Lao Army sending four 105mm howitzers and one division to counter communist advances.

On 23rd April, Pathet Lao captured the strategic junction at Sala Phou Khoun after four days of fighting, with two right-wing fighters killed and four injured.

On 26th April, right-wing forces were reportedly pushed out of Phouphanang, Dane Soung and Na Hnang.

On 7th May, Pathet Lao troops supported by tanks and artillery captured two outposts north of Muang Kasi. A day later they captured Muang Kasi itself after 10 minutes of fighting. On 9 May five right-wing ministers resigned from the government including the Defense Minister, Sisouk na Champassak, and Finance Minister Ngon Sananikone; Khamphai Abphay, Minister of Public Health; Tianethone Chantharasy, the Deputy Foreign Minister, and Houmphanh Saignasith, the Deputy Minister of Public Works. On 14 May troops in Vang Vieng revolted and joined communists. Meanwhile the Lao Air Force was grounded by the new communist defence minister.

=== Fall of Vientiane ===
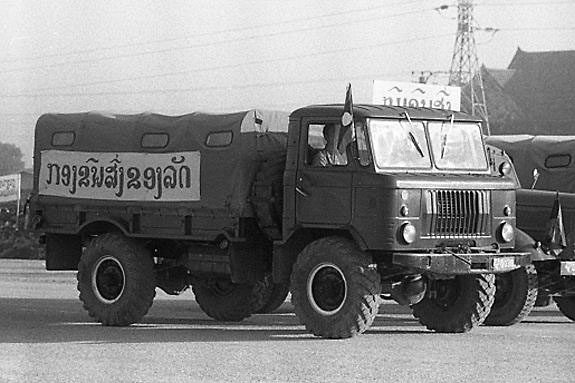
Pathet Lao truck in Vientiane, 1975

On 21st May, protesters occupied and looted the USAID compound in Vientiane demanding all employees to leave. Meanwhile Pathet Lao security guards prevented American families from entering the military base neighborhood. On 26th May a U.S. backed guerilla unit reportedly surrendered to the communists at Ban Chieng village north of Vientiane near Muong Kassi. On 28th May, it was reported that Pathet Lao deployed a number of 23mm and 37mm anti-aircraft guns on the runaway of the Wattay International Airport.

On 20th June, Pathet Lao captured Tha Deua port, followed by the Xaythany district north of Vientiane on 26th June. On 23 August 1975, a contingent of 50 Pathet Lao women symbolically liberated the city. On 2 December, the day after the Pathet Lao-organized National Conference of People's Representatives voted to immediately abolish the monarchy, King Savang Vatthana agreed to abdicate and Souvanna Phouma resigned. The Lao People's Democratic Republic was proclaimed, with Souphanouvong as President. Kaysone Phomvihane emerged from the shadows to become Prime Minister and the real ruler of the country.

=== Fall of Northern Laos ===
On 28th May or 3rd June Pathet Lao troops entered Sainyabuli, followed by Luang Prabang (9th June) and Houayxay (14th June). On 20th June locals in Pak Lay and Borikham revolted against the government and set up a new left-wing administration.

=== Fall of Southern Laos ===
On 16th May Pathet Lao entered Pakse, followed by Thakhek and Kengkok (19th May), Savannakhet and Seno (20th May), Phonthong (24th May) and Champasak (25th May).

On 1st June the anti-communist base in Kong My surrendered to communists.

=== Offensive against Hmong strongholds ===
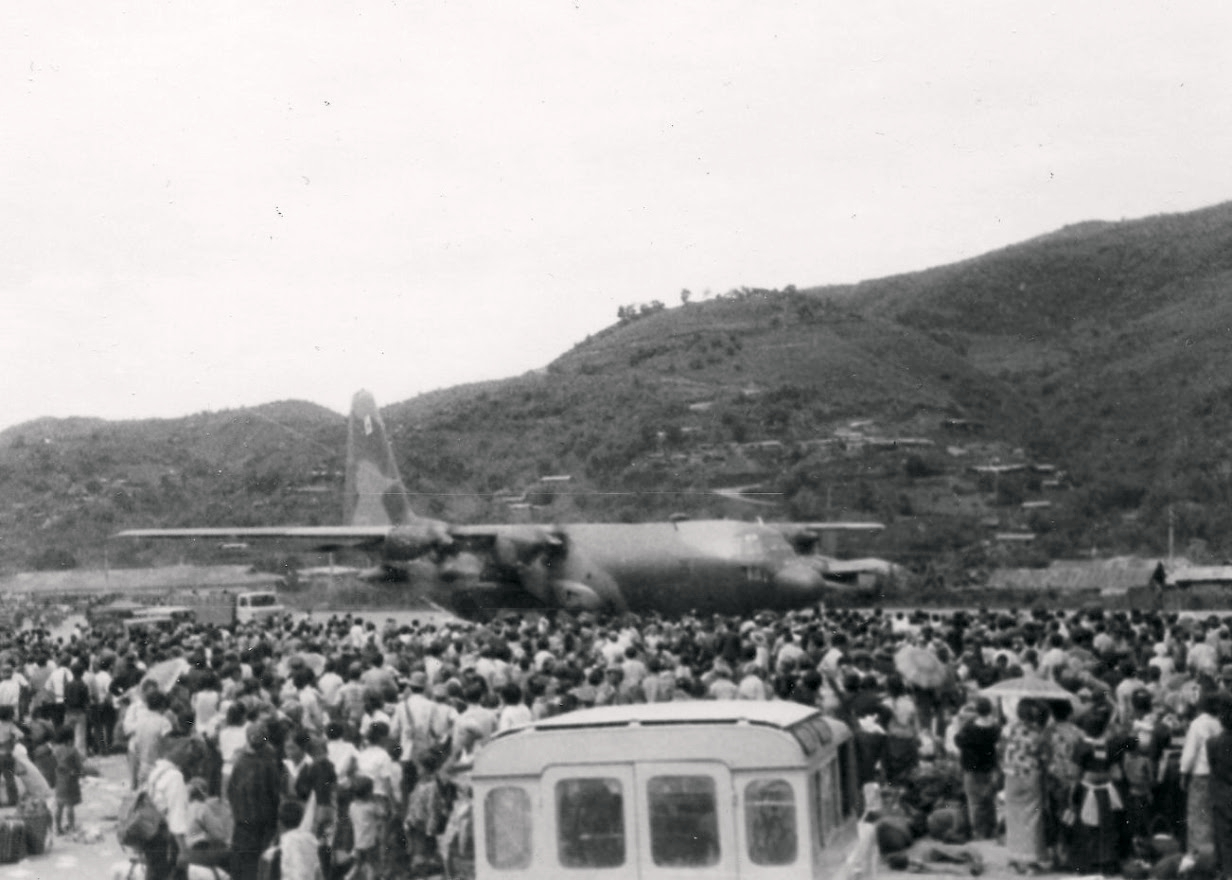
The U.S. evacuated circa 1,000-3,000 of circa 10,000+ Hmong from Long Tieng, Laos, to Namphong, Thailand, 12-14 May 1975

On 14th May, communists overran CIA-backed base at Long Tieng which housed Hmong guerillas fighting against Pathet Lao. On 18th May, Hmong bases at Sam Thong and Bouamlong fell without any significant fighting. Six days later it was reported that around 50,000 Hmong people, some of them armed, gathered at their former base of Ban Xon attempting to follow their leader and flee to Thailand.

On 29th May 1975, about 10,000 Hmong people, attempted to cross Hin Heup bridge on their way to Vientiane. As the group crossed the bridge Pathet Lao forces attacked the column using mortars, M16s, and bayonets. Many people jumped into the river to flee the firing troops, by the end of the massacre 14 civilians were killed and over 100 wounded.

== Refugee crisis ==
What nobody had anticipated was how tens of thousands of Hmong, left behind in Long Tieng and Laos, would follow Vang Pao and other Hmong leaders to Thailand. By the end of 1975, about 40,000 Hmong had succeeded to reaching Thailand, traveling on foot through the mountains and floating across the Mekong River. How many died or were killed in their attempt to escape Laos is not known, but the flight of Hmong and other Laotian highland peoples into Thailand would continue for many more years. They faced repression at home from the communist government for their collaboration with the Americans. Most of the Hmong in Thailand would eventually be resettled in the United States and other countries. Between 1975 and 1982, 53,700 Hmong and other highland Laotian refugees were resettled in the United States and thousands more in other countries.

About 90% of Laos's intellectuals, technicians, and officials left Laos following the communist takeover. Many of the professional and intellectual class, who had initially been willing to work for the new regime, changed their minds and left; a much easier thing to do from Laos than from either Vietnam or Cambodia. Laos experienced the largest refugee flight per capita of any Indochinese nation, with 10% of the population – 300,000 people out of a total of 3 million – crossing the border into Thailand.

== Evacuation of right-wing officials ==
In May 1975 multiple important figure in the government fled the country to Thailand in the face of communist offensive, including chief of staff Oudone Sananikone, major general Kouprasith Abhay, commander of the south Souchay Vongsavan, and prince of Champassak Boun Oum. General Vang Pao together with his wife May Song Vang were evacuated to Thailand shortly before the fall of Long Tieng.

== See also ==
- 1975 spring offensive
- Fall of Phnom Penh
