= Campaign Z =

1971 North Vietnamese offensive in Laos

- Part of Laotian Civil War; Vietnam War
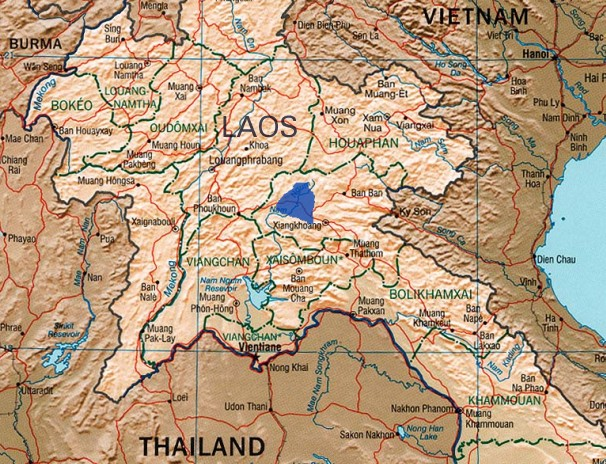
- The Plain of Jars, the area in and around which Campaign Z was mainly fought, is highlighted in blue
Date	17 December 1971 – 30 January 1972
Location	Xiangkhouang Province
Result	People's Army of Vietnam fails to take Long Tieng
Territorial changes	People's Army of Vietnam temporarily takes Skyline Ridge outside Long Tieng

Belligerents
North Vietnam; Supported by: Soviet Union; People's Republic of China	Kingdom of Laos; Thailand; Supported by United States

Commanders and leaders
MG Lê Trọng Tấn; Colonel Vũ Lập	Vang Pao

Units involved
335th Independent Regiment; 174th Regiment Mechanized Infantry; 27th Sapper Battalion; 195th Armored Battalion; 312th Division; 148th Regiment; 14th Antiaircraft Battalion	(Laos) Groupement Mobile 21; Groupement Mobile 23; Groupement Mobile 22; Groupement Mobile 31; Groupement Mobile 30; Royalist guerrilla battalions (Thailand) Thai mercenary units including BC 609

Campaign Z (17 December 1971 – 30 January 1972) was a military offensive by the People's Army of Vietnam; it was a combined arms thrust designed to defeat the last Royal Lao Army troops defending the Kingdom of Laos. The Communist assault took Skyline Ridge overlooking the vital Royalist base of Long Tieng and forced the restationing of Royalist aviation assets and civilian refugees. However, Communist forces eventually receded back onto their lines of communication without capturing the base.

Campaign Z was notable for escalations of the Laotian Civil War conflict. The Vietnamese Communists brought 130 mm field guns and T-34 tanks into action in Laos for the first time. The Vietnamese People's Air Force also launched MiG 21 attacks into Lao air space to challenge the Royalist side's air supremacy. On its side, the Royal Lao Government and its Central Intelligence Agency backers imported copious numbers of mercenaries from the Kingdom of Thailand as reinforcements, and depended on American air power support, including Arc Light strikes by B-52 Stratofortresses. The Kingdom would narrowly survive Campaign Z.

== Overview ==
The Kingdom of Laos was established as a neutral independent constitutional monarchy by the 1954 Geneva Agreement. In 1962, the International Agreement on the Neutrality of Laos reaffirmed the principle that no foreign military personnel could be stationed in Laos except for a French training mission. Despite that international proviso, troops of the People's Army of Vietnam (PAVN) had occupied Houaphanh Province as early as 1953 while the Democratic Republic of Vietnam (DRV) denied their presence. In turn, as part of the American assumption of total support of the Royal Lao Government, the Central Intelligence Agency (CIA) covertly raised a Hmong guerrilla army under General Vang Pao around the Plain of Jars in Military Region 2 (MR 2).

== Background ==
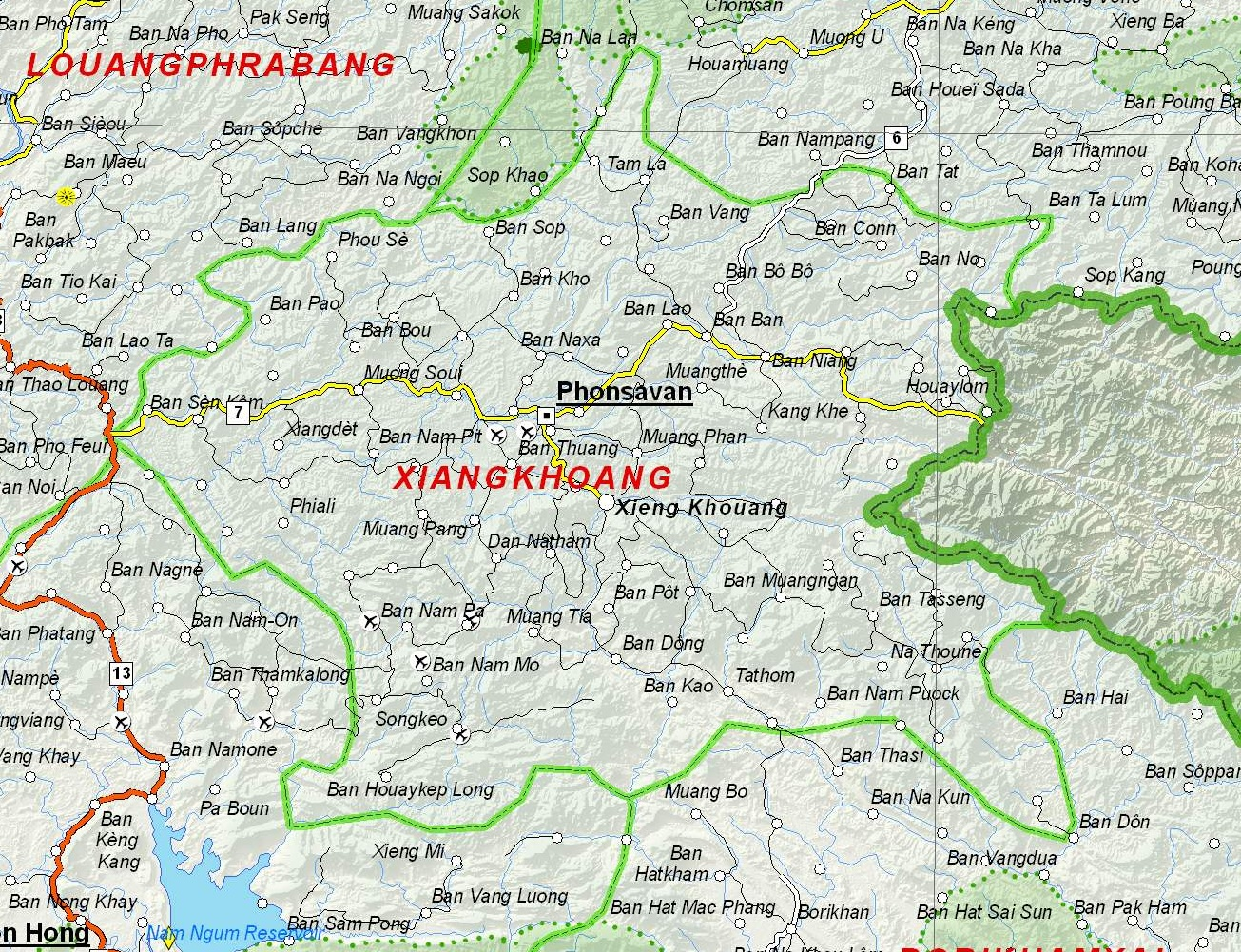
Xiangkhoang Province, Laos contains the Plain of Jars where Campaign Z was waged.

While the war on the Ho Chi Minh Trail in the southern Laotian panhandle was considered an extension of the Vietnam War, the war in northern Laos was the heart of the Laotian Civil War. It was a seesaw war. In November 1968, Vang Pao and his guerrillas had waged Operation Pigfat and been rather successful with Operation Raindance. The PAVN short sharp riposte of Campaign Toan Thang during 18–27 June 1969 redressed the balance by capturing the strategic forward air base at Muang Soui. From 1–15 July, the Royalists hastily struck back with Operation Off Balance. That was followed up by Kou Kiet, also called Operation About Face, which in August and September 1970 recaptured the Plain of Jars from the Communists at the cost of excessive Hmong casualties. Stepping on the tail of Kou Kiet, the Communist combined arms offensive of Campaign 139 was a gross escalation of the war, waged from September 1969 through April 1970. At its end, the Vietnamese Communists had conquered the Plain and besieged the main guerrilla base at Long Tieng, nearly winning the war. The aptly named Operation Counterpunch by the Royalists, fought during Autumn 1970, succeeded in buying the Hmong some time. In turn, Campaign 74B was a Communist combined arms offensive during Spring 1971 that once again besieged Long Tieng.

== Preliminary activities ==
As the forces of Campaign 74B receded back upon their lines of communication during summer 1971, opening a 20 kilometer gap between the armies, L'armée Clandestine advanced onto the Plain of Jars and occupied about half of it. Anticipating further attacks by the PAVN, the Royalists set up half a dozen fire support heavy weapons bases networking the Plain with mutually supporting fans of artillery fire. Their CIA supporters arranged for reinforcement by Thai mercenary battalions from Operation Unity, as little manpower was available from other military regions. The Royalists were fielding approximately 5,000 troops in 19 battalions. Five of these were Hmong; four were Lao regular army battalions. The remaining ten battalions were Thai mercenaries.

Meantime, the PAVN moved T-34 tanks and 16 130mm field guns from North Vietnam into Laos to support future offensives. Although a smaller caliber than a 155mm howitzer, the 130mm cannon seriously out-ranged the 155mm weapon. According to CIA tribal road watch spy teams, the PAVN also reinforced with at least 6,400 fresh troops. Once again, as in Campaigns 139 and 74B, the PAVN fielded a combined arms force. This time it appeared to contain two full divisions. Major General Lê Trọng Tấn, fresh from successfully commanding an army corps of PAVN troops in Operation Lam Son 719, was picked to command the upcoming Campaign Z. Colonel Vũ Lập, who had commanded Campaign 139, was his deputy.

== Campaign Z ==
=== The initial push ===
The annual Hmong New Year kicked off on 16 December 1971; many officers found their way rearward from their front-line units to the celebration. There was unseasonable rain on 17 December, grounding aviation. Campaign Z began with a PAVN drive down the Ban Ban Valley. The strike force consisted of the 335th Independent Regiment, mechanized infantry of the 316th PAVN Division's 174th Regiment, the 27th Sapper Battalion, and the 195th Armored Battalion. New to the fighting in northern Laos were T34 tanks and Type 63 armored personnel carriers. The PAVN objective was the destruction of two Royalist guerrilla regiments, Groupement Mobile 21 (GM 21) and Groupement Mobile 23 (GM 23).

Simultaneously, the 312th PAVN Division retraced its previous successful line of attack, driving down Route 72 at Groupement Mobile 22 in the southeastern PDJ. Anticipating the PAVN arrival, the guerrillas began to abandon their weapons as they sifted to the rear past the Thai fire bases.

With their light infantry screen withdrawn, the Thai fire bases now came under attack. The PAVN used a new tactic of counter-fire on the batteries to coop the Thai gunners in their bunkers. It would lift this fire in bare time for its infantry to overrun the fire bases. Without time to react, many of the Thais were trapped in their bunkers.

On 18 December 1971, in another first for the northern Lao theater of war, the Vietnam People's Air Force (VPAF) unexpectedly challenged the U.S. Air Force (USAF) and Royal Lao Air Force (RLAF) air supremacy. The VPAF thrust by MiG 21s disrupted the entirety of the air war over the PDJ. All strikes had to be called off; bomb loads had to be jettisoned willy nilly. The propeller driven craft fled due west to escape the MiGs. U.S. Air Force F-4 Phantom II fighters turned to fight the VPAF. The USAF lost three F-4s that day.

Combat Search and Rescue (CSAR) for the downed fliers on 19 December absorbed fifty aircraft in its efforts, leading to another day of weak tactical air support for the Royalists. Even after the end of the CSAR, air support was weakened by necessary countermeasures to MiG 21 intrusions, whether real or feinted.

The end of the Thai fire bases came on 20 December; all six of them were overrun. Nor were the Hmong home free; one battalion of 800 suffered about 200 wounded, and nearly that many killed. Overall, Royalist casualties for the three days combat were 286 killed, 418 wounded, and 1,500 missing. The Royalists also lost 24 howitzers to the Communists.

=== The battle for Skyline Ridge ===
On 21 December 1971, the 174th PAVN Regiment, backed by the 14th Antiaircraft Battalion, took Hill 1663. From its summit, they poured plunging fire on the nearby Royalist position at Ban Na until it was evacuated.

Groupement Mobile 31 (GM 31) arrived from Military Region 3 to reinforce the Royalists on 22 December. By 28 December, MR 2 had received six Lao battalions and 11 replacement howitzers; 25 more of the latter were en route. On 30 December, Groupement Mobile 30 (GM 30) arrived as additional reinforcement. By now, half of the 4,000 guerrillas that had succumbed to the initial PAVN attacks were still unaccounted for. The situation was desperate enough that 111 B-52 sorties had struck in support of the Royalists during December. The PAVN shot down six T-28 Trojans and three Phantoms during the same period.

On 30 December 1971, Communist forces attacked Sala Phou Khoun, a strategic intersection in the Royalist rear; the counter for this would become Operation Maharat. The next day, the first Communist 130mm shells fell on Long Tieng. They blew up the main ammo dump, including its RLAF facilities. Vang Pao unexpectedly left his headquarters at the vital guerrilla base. His CIA advisers followed him to a smoky hut in Ban Song Sai, 21 kilometers to the southwest. There they found him ill, depressed, weeping, and cursing the lack of air support. He returned to Long Tieng with them. They took him to hospital on 4 January, to be admitted for treatment of viral pneumonia.

By 5 January 1972, about 600 rounds of 130mm explosives had hit Long Tieng. Radio intercepts of PAVN messages revealed 24 PAVN battalions were poised to attack the Royalists. On the Royalist side, both GM 21 and GM 23 had been mauled into uselessness. Eight of the Royalist infantry battalions had been relieved for refitting. Given the gravity of the PAVN threat to the Long Tieng base, its aviation operations were dispersed away from Communist reach. The TACAN air navigation system on Skyline Ridge was moved 20 kilometers further south to another mountaintop. Flight operations—whether RLAF, Air America, or Continental Air Services, Inc—followed the refugee relief effort, which had been transferred from Sam Thong to nearby Ban Son. In Vang Pao's absence, discipline slipped; there was some looting by both Thais and Hmong.

On both 7 and 9 January 1972, PAVN sappers penetrated Long Tieng's defenses in raids against the 20 Alternate airfield there. On 11 January, CIA case agents began construction of hardened bunkers for protection from shell fire. That same day, PAVN troops from the 335th Independent Regiment, the 148th Regiment, and 14th Antiaircraft Battalion overran a Royalist guerrilla battalion, pushed GM 23 out of the way, and attacked Long Tieng from the north, northeast, and east. They pushed a Thai mercenary battalion from the Charlie Alpha helicopter landing zone, the highest point on Skyline Ridge overlooking Long Tieng. Meanwhile, down south in Bangkok, the deputy chairman of the National Executive Council floated the idea that the Hmong could relocate to Thailand to escape the war.

On 12 January, GM 30 was lifted back to the base of Skyline Ridge and ascended to the Charlie Echo landing pad on its western end. On 14 January, two Thai battalions were brought in to seize both ends of the Ridge. The subsequent eastward assault along the ridgeline on 17 January by GM 30 was supported by the Thais, artillery fire, and B-52 strikes. By 18 January, the Hmong irregulars had reclaimed all but the eastern end of the ridge at a cost of 35 killed and 69 wounded.

==== Media reaction ====
On 14 January, the PAVN's daily newspaper, Quan Doi Nhan Dan, proclaimed victory at Long Tieng. On 16 January, they ran a detailed account of the "victory", complete with campaign map.

The fighting had garnered the attention of foreign correspondents, who now deemed it "the most important battleground of the Indochina war". Previously denied access to the secretive base at Long Tieng, on 19 January the journalists were finally granted entry. Two helicopter loads of reporters from United Press International, The New York Times, Associated Press, and other media outlets were flown in after swearing not to reveal the identity of any CIA personnel on site. They were shuttled about the battlefield, with a doughty few electing to be convoyed in to the GM 30 positions. While there, a few mortar shells dropped in nearby. When a medevac helicopter came in, the unhurt journalists barged aboard before a wounded Thai officer could be loaded. A later medevac had to be called in for the wounded major after the reporters departed. The journalists changed their mind about an overnight stay at Long Tieng, and were flown back to Vientiane later that day.

=== Retreat of PAVN ===
On 20 January 1972, two PAVN battalions attacked Skyline Ridge, inflicting 45 casualties on GM 30. After their retreat, their position was occupied by a Royalist guerrilla battalion advised by CIA case agent George Bacon, call sign Kayak. Also, by 24 January, GM 30 and two Royalist guerrilla battalions swept the remaining PAVN from Skyline Ridge. By then, four supporting Thai artillery positions had been set up in an arc about nine kilometers south of Long Tieng. That same day, two fresh battalions of Thais arrived as Royalist reinforcements. On 25 January, four more battalions of Thais arrived; on 27 January, two more. On 30 January 1972, GM 30 was relieved and flown home to Military Region 3. Vang Pao shuffled his troops into the best possible defensive positions. Once again, the PAVN had come up short on capturing Long Tieng.

== Result ==
As in Campaign 139, the PAVN pulled up just short of overrunning Long Tieng and ending the Laotian Civil War. The Royalists were battered and in questionable shape to undertake an offensive. With further North Vietnamese offensives in the offing, the American government found itself presented with a double-edged dilemma. L'Armee Clandestine was the only Lao military force still ready to fight in northern Laos—but barely ready. Continued defense of Long Tieng could lead to their defeat and loss of the war. On the other hand, removing the Hmong from their traditional homeland might irretrievably break their fighting spirit, and lose the war. However, Ambassador G. McMurtrie Godley, who actually directed the war, believed that with the PAVN being attrited by air strikes, the Hmong could endure. Besides, Vang Pao had returned from hospital, and Hmong morale consequently perked up. On the other hand, CIA Chief of Station Hugh Tovar believed that the Lao were becoming disgusted with the Americans risking only money and supplies while Lao were being killed.
