= Communist takeover =

Communist takeover refers to:

- Communist takeover of China in 1949 near the end of the Chinese Civil War
- Communist takeover of Laos in 1975 following the Laotian Civil War
- Communist takeover of Russia in 1917 with the October Revolution
- Communist takeover of Saigon in 1975 at the end of the Vietnam War
