= Operation Maharat II =

- Part of Laotian Civil War; Vietnam War
Date	31 December 1972 – 5 February 1973
Location	Sala Phou Khoun, central northern Laos
Result	Royalist capture Routes 7/13 road junction

Belligerents
Kingdom of Laos; Supported by United States	(Laos) Pathet Lao; Supported by: Soviet Union; People's Republic of China

Units involved
Four Royal Lao Army battalions One Forces Armee Neutralistes battalion 11th Brigade; Elements of 12th Brigade; Elements of 13th Brigade; Three Thai mercenary battalions Groupement Mobile 31; Groupement Mobile 203; Two M24 Chaffee tanks Three 155mm howitzers	Four Pathet Lao battalions Two PT-76 tanks

Strength
Regimental-size	Battalion-size

Casualties and losses
Unknown	Unknown

Operation Maharat II (31 December 1972 – 5 February 1973) was a Royalist offensive against Pathet Lao insurrectionists during the Laotian Civil War. The Royalists planned a two pronged convergence on four Pathet Lao battalions holding the intersection of routes 7 and 13. With neither side particularly avid for combat, the situation was resolved by the Royalist reinforcement of its attack forces until the Communists faced overwhelming odds. The Pathet Lao then decamped. Operation Maharat II ended on 5 February with an artillery fire base supporting an irregular regiment occupying the road intersection. On 22 February 1973, a ceasefire took effect.

== Overview ==
The French Protectorate of Laos saw a Communist-led insurrection following World War II. The Viet Minh-allied Pathet Lao (PL) rebellion flourished as Laos moved towards independence.

The new nation was left with a minimal road network, principally oriented toward connecting inland Laos with the Vietnamese coast. Route 13 was the sole north–south highway of any length. Route 7 branched eastwards from Route 13 at the Sala Phou Khoun intersection; the road ran through the strategic Plain of Jars into northern Vietnam.

The Route 7-13 junction at Sala Phou Khoun would become a nexus of conflict during the Laotian Civil War. Indeed, it was fought over in July 1964 and again in January 1972.

== Background ==
On 31 December 1972, four Pathet Lao battalions pushed west along Route 7 from the Plain of Jars toward the intersection with north-south Route 13. Royal Lao Army troops abandoned their gear and departed southwards along Route 13. This left the Communists in control of the road linking Vientiane with Luang Prabang.

== Offensive ==
The Royal Lao Army (RLA) general staff launched a two pronged reprisal reminiscent of the original Operation Maharat. The southern contingent of attackers would move north along Route 13 from Moung Kassy. It comprised four Royalist battalions from Military Region 5 (MR 5), an allied battalion from Forces Armee Neutralistes (FAN), two M24 Chaffee tanks, three 155mm howitzers, supporting elements of both the 12th and 13th brigades, and six American advisers from Project 404. The northern contingent consisted of the 11th Brigade; it was airlifted over the Communists and landed north of them. The two columns converged on Sala Phou Khoun and the 7-13 road junction.

In the event, the northern column made scant progress. However, by 6 January, the southern column was 12 kilometers south of the intersection. However, a battalion commander was killed by Communist artillery, and the column retreated. By January 8, they had receded to Moung Kassy.

On 9 and 10 January, the southern Royalist force was reinforced by three Thai mercenary battalions. On 12 January, a Raven Forward Air Controller operating beneath an overcast sky, spotted a Communist force moving south on Route 13. In the absence of any other air power, the Raven fired a marking rocket at one of a pair of PT-76 tanks; the sonic boom of the rocket frightened the Pathet Lao infantry into retreat.

The Thai infantry scattered before the oncoming tanks. One of the PT-76 tanks engaged a Royalist M-24 Chaffee tank before turning to retreat. However, the Thai infantry rallied and destroyed both Communist PT-76s, ending that assault.

At this point, the Royalist offensive stalled and outside troops were ordered in to revive it. On 20 January, Groupement Mobile 31 (GM 31), a regiment of 1,166 men, was airlifted into action five kilometers southeast of Sala Phou Khoun. Despite sporadic ground fire at the landing zone, they landed successfully. They spent the next four days slowly approaching the road junction, only to find it vacated by the four Communist battalions.

== Results ==
Once Sala Phou Khoun was occupied by GM 31, the two Royalist columns raced toward it to link up, clearing Route 13 as they came. On 31 January, Groupement Mobile 203 (GM 203) brought another four battalions in to garrison the intersection. On 2 February, GM 31 returned to MR 3. On 5 February 1973, an artillery fire base manned by Thai mercenaries arrived to back up the GM 203 garrison.

== Aftermath ==
On 22 February 1973, the ceasefire that ended the Laotian Civil War went into effect.
