= Campaign 74B =

- Part of Laotian Civil War; Vietnam War
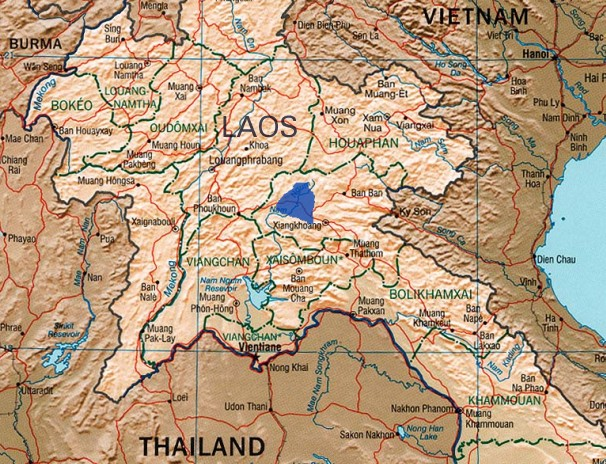
- The Plain of Jars, the location of Campaign 74B, highlighted in blue
Date	2 February – 30 April 1971
Location	Plain of Jars and Long Tieng, Laos
Result	After a successful offensive, People's Army of Vietnam withdraws
Territorial changes	People's Army of Vietnam temporarily captures Plain of Jars

Belligerents
North Vietnam; Supported by: Soviet Union; People's Republic of China	Laos; Forces Armées Neutralistes; Thailand; Supported by United States

Commanders and leaders
	(Laos) Vang Pao

Units involved
316th Division; 866th Independent Regiment; 165th Regiment; Three Dac Cong sapper battalions	(Thailand) Task Force Vang Pao; Task Force Singha (Laos) Bataillon Infanterie 15; Groupement Mobile 23; Groupement Mobile 21; Groupement Mobile 22; Royal Lao Air Force; Bataillon Artillerie 635; Bataillon Infanterie 17

Campaign 74B (2 February–30 April 1971) was a major combined arms offensive by the People's Army of Vietnam (PAVN) during the Laotian Civil War. The Communist offensive, if successful, would knock the last remaining fighting troops of the Kingdom of Laos out of the war, ensuring the Vietnamese conquest of Laos. The PAVN 316th Division—reinforced by artillery, tanks, and sappers—attacked during a period of slackened tactical air support for General Vang Pao's guerrilla army; Operation Lam Son 719 was being waged at the same time. Having captured the highly strategic Plain of Jars during Operation 74B, the Communists attackers managed to penetrate deeply enough to fire upon the main guerrilla base at Long Tieng.

Disaster was staved off by importing mercenary troops from the neighboring Kingdom of Thailand. Using aerial mobility to outmaneuver the Communists, the Royalists managed to stave off defeat until the Vietnamese had to withdraw due to lack of supplies. As the Communist offensive wilted, Vang Pao was pressured by his backers in Washington, D.C. to ramp down operations to encourage peace talks to settle the war. Vietnamization would soon cut his tactical air support still further. Yet the Communists were still poised to finish L'Armee Clandestine, and could not be ignored. The Hmong general compromised by staging an "active defense" of limited spoiling counterattacks to regain ground in the aftermath of Campaign 74B.

== Overview ==
The French loss of the First Indochina War led to the establishment of the independent Kingdom of Laos by the 1954 Geneva Agreements. Laotian neutrality called for a ban on foreign military forces save for a French advisory mission. However, North Vietnamese troops had settled in northeastern Laos to support a Lao communist insurrection.

== Background ==
A major theater of battle during the resulting Laotian Civil War was the Plain of Jars (PDJ). There Royalist Hmong guerrillas trained by the Central Intelligence Agency (CIA) and backed by air power fought it out with People's Army of Vietnam (PAVN) regulars. During 1969 and 1970, a series of seesaw battles were fought on and around the PDJ. Hmong General Vang Pao directed a series of offensives dependent on air superiority blasting a way for his guerrillas. The Communists staged their own counteroffensives. Vang Pao's Operation Pigfat and Operation Raindance were countered by the PAVN's Campaign Toan Thang. Vang Pao struck back with Operation Off Balance and Kou Kiet. The Communists retaliated with the massive combined arms Campaign 139, running from 13 September 1969 to 25 April 1970, which nearly won them the war. The aptly named monarchist Operation Counterpunch, fought from 26 September 1969 through 7 January 1971, barely kept the Royal Lao Government in the war.

== Order of battle ==
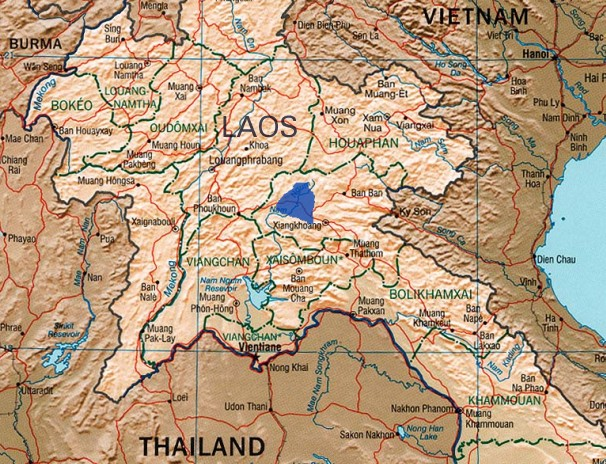
The Plain of Jars, the location of Campaign 74B, is marked by the blue shading.

Campaign 139 had marked the first use of combined arms in the Laotian Civil War. Campaign 74B was the second combined arms assault, though somewhat fewer troops were allotted for 74B. The PAVN units for 74B had previously fought in Campaign 139 over the same ground. They consisted of the 316th PAVN Division, the 866th Independent Regiment, the 165th Regiment from the 312th PAVN Division, and three Dac Cong sapper battalions, backed by artillery and tanks. The major difference was that all, not part, of the 312th Division had participated in Campaign 139. Another difference was the shortage of ammunition for the PAVN caused by air interdiction of Communist supply lines.

Poised to fend off any attack was Task Force Vang Pao, a reinforced regiment of Thai mercenaries. They occupied three static positions in and around the vital guerrilla base of Long Tieng in Military Region 2; they also manned four separate artillery positions for fire support. One of these artillery units, at Ban Na, was also occupied by Bataillon Infanterie 15 (BI 15). Bataillon Infanterie 17 (BI 17) from the allied Forces Armee Neutralistes (FAN) garrisoned the forward fighter base at Muang Soui. Then there were three guerrilla regiments available for mobile operations. A Royalist guerrilla regiment, Groupement Mobile 23 (GM 23), was stationed nearby. Groupement Mobile 21 (GM 21) had been stationed at the old Project Momentum base at Ban Padong to recuperate from service in Operation Counterpunch. A third partisan regiment, GM 22, was stationed near Tha Tham Bleung. The Thai mercenaries were nearing the end of their year's assignment in Laos—this fact would have its effect on the unfolding tactical situation.

An important constituent of the Royalist strength was tactical air power. The Royal Lao Air Force (RLAF), backed by an all out effort by their Air Commando advisers, doubled their daily sortie rate to 44. 7th Air Force (7th AF) committed 48 daily sorties, with 12 more held ready as a quick reaction force. This was a sharp contrast to the 200 sorties per day of U.S. tactical air that had been available just a few months prior during Kou Kiet. There was a concerted effort to more efficiently use such U.S. air power as was received. For air strike control, the U.S. Air Attaché promulgated a designated battle area (DBA) containing the Communist units threatening Long Tieng. The main Communist gun parks and troop staging areas could be bombed by jets using all-weather methods under Instrument Flight Rules (IFR) in certain areas. Communist bases on the Plain of Jars, down to Ban Ban, and east along Route 7 to the North Vietnamese border were free fire zones. All other air strikes would be under the existing rules of engagement, which included targets being acquired, marked and directed by Raven Forward Air Controllers operating from Long Tieng's 20 Alternate airfield.

== Campaign 74B ==
=== The Communist offensive ===
On 2 February 1971, the PAVN rained down a barrage of artillery fire on the Neutralists at the Moung Soui air base. Five of the PAVN PT-76 tanks closed for an assault. By 0600 hours 3 February, BI 17 was fleeing their stronghold, abandoning four 75mm howitzers.

The Communists next attacked a Thai artillery position at Ban Na. To discourage close air support for the Thais, the North Vietnamese moved in heavy machine guns ringing the site for antiaircraft defense. They then shelled the encircled Thais with 85 mm and 122 mm artillery rounds. They also shelled a second Thai artillery position on Zebra Ridge, as well as a Thai infantry position atop Phou Long Mat.

Foul weather, unusual for February, hindered flight operations. Taking advantage of the cloud cover, a battalion from the 866th Independent Regiment and a company of 41st Dac Cong Battalion moved down the Nam Bleung Valley. On 7 February, they struck GM 22. With the huge Operation Lam Son 719 offensive beginning against the Ho Chi Minh Trail on 8 February in southern Laos, the fighting in northern Laos suddenly rated only 24 sorties of tactical air support per day.

While the Communist battalion tied up the guerrilla regiment, 1st Company of the 27th Dac Cong Battalion infiltrated past those Royalists. Beginning at midnight 13 February, Dac Cong commandos took the major guerrilla base at Long Tieng under fire with a DK-82 recoilless rifle. This threat to the vital Royalist stronghold was diversion for another element of Dac Cong. This latter element had circled to move in from the south, headed toward the King's villa; they destroyed a 105 mm howitzer near it. The Dac Cong set up a mortar and began shelling Long Tieng. For the first time ever, the PAVN fired 122 mm and 140 mm rockets at the base. The chaotic situation was not helped by Vang Pao's overnight absence in Udorn, Thailand; the Hmong partisans of L'Armee Clandestine depended upon his orders.

If the paucity of air support were not problematic enough, on 14 February, an F-4 Phantom II inadvertently dropped cluster munitions on civilian dependents. Thirty Hmong women and children were killed; 170 wounded. A munitions dump, a mess hall, the CIA dormitory, all were struck. Vang Pao landed back at Long Tieng in the wake of this dispiriting disaster. Also arriving were two Thai mercenary battalions, Bataillon Commando 603 (BC 603) and Bataillon Commando 604 (BC 604) which were stationed on Skyline Ridge to ward off the Dac Cong sappers.

With the PAVN onslaught moving southwestwards of the PDJ towards the Hmong heartland, Vang Pao thought of a diversionary effort east of the PDJ a la Operation Counterpunch III. Instead, his CIA backers supplied him with a guerrilla regiment imported from Military Region 3 to the south. Landed on 28 February 1971, Groupement Mobile 31 (GM 31) was tasked with sweeping north from Skyline Ridge overlooking Long Tieng. They swept north toward the refugee center at Sam Thong. However, the operation's start was delayed by insubordination among the troops. Desertions began from Bataillon Guerrier 318 (BG 318) and Bataillon Guerrier 308 (BG 308) on 6 March. BG 318 refused its duties for two days until they were paid their overdue salaries. BG 308 retreated to Long Tieng with a bill of complaints. They were appeased by relief of their commanding officer and the elevation of his deputy. Only after those matters were settled did the guerrillas resume operations.

On 3 March, two more offensive Thai mercenary battalions, Bataillon Commando 605 (BC 605) and Bataillon Commando 606 (BC 606), landed at Long Tieng. Fending off Vang Pao's notion that the Thai units should be reduced to platoon-size reinforcements for Hmong guerrillas units, the CIA advisers lumped the newly arrived battalions together with the two battalions on Skyline Ridge as Task Force Singha. BCs 605 and 606 swept north to Sam Thong with little opposition.

On 9 and 10 March, BG 308 was helicoptered back to its line of departure at Sam Thong to resume moving towards its objective, the Nam Ngum (Ngum River). On 15 March, Task Force Singha gained two more Thai units, Bataillon Commando 601 (BC 601) and Bataillon Commando 602 (BC 602). The newly arrived battalions were directed against Phou Tham Seh, a high point three kilometers north of Skyline Ridge. Despite being overburdened with weighty weaponry, drenched by rain, and chilled by freezing nights, they took the ridge.

On 19 March, BC 605 and BC 606 were helilifted into the Tha Tham Bleung Valley; their objective was nearby Ban Hintang. The next day, GM 31 reached the bank of the Nam Ngum. BC 605 and BC 606 would have no such luck in achieving their objective. They clashed twice with the PAVN before withdrawing southward on 27 March to friendly positions on Zebra Ridge.

Meanwhile, during the furor of battle, Bataillon Artillerie 635 (BA 635) arrived to relieve the artillery positions on Zebra Ridge and the western end of Skyline Ridge. Brown smog from swidden farming clogged the atmosphere, inhibiting the use of such little air support that was available.

However, the Thai artillery strongpoint at Ban Na had come under siege during the opening of Campaign 74B. Now the 165th Regiment from the 312th Division joined the attack. However, weather was not the only hindrance to close air support for the Thais; U.S. tactical air was also being diverted to bomb North Vietnam. Instead, BC 605 and BC 606 were tasked with seizing Hill 1663, four kilometers southwest of Ban Na. On 29 March, they lined up on the landing zone for insertion into a landing zone at the foot of Hill 1663. Forty troopers from BC 605 deserted rather than load up; they walked back to Long Tieng. The dutiful Thai troops were stalled at the base of the hill after they landed, fended off by a lightly manned PAVN defense.

On 1 April, GM 31 was withdrawn from its quiet sector on the bank of the Nam Ngum; its new position was eight kilometers east of Sam Thong, protecting its flank. That same day, the Royalists assaulting Hill 1663 were reinforced by troops from Groupement Mobile 23 (GM 23), and took the hill on 1 April. A 105 mm howitzer and a 4.2-inch mortar were emplaced on the hilltop as an improvised fire base. With Hill 1663 as a refuge for the besieged forces on Ban Na, BC 606 was ordered to direct a rescue march toward Ban Na on 3 April. As they lined up for the attack, a Phantom II dropped a 2,000-pound bomb on them. The friendly fire incident killed 16 Thais, including BC 605's commanding officer, and a company commander from BC 606. As a result of this accident, which aborted the relief expedition, it was decided to attach a forward air guide to each Thai battalion. Meanwhile, Bataillon Commando 604 (BC 604) reinforced the Hill 1663 stronghold.

At 2100 hours on 6 April, with Vang Pao's consent, the besieged Thais abandoned Ban Na. However, instead of fleeing to Hill 1663, they moved south toward Bataillon Infanterie 14 (BI 14) atop Phou Long Mat, suffering middling casualties in the process. The loss of Ban Na relieved the last impediment to Communist control southeast of the Plain of Jars.

=== Vang Pao's dilemma ===
General Vang Pao now found himself in a strategic dilemma. Although his Operation Barrel Roll tactical air allotment had been temporarily increased to 60 daily sorties to support his operation, he knew Vietnamization would slash that quota on 1 July. The U.S. belief that Operation Lam Son 719 was best followed by ongoing interdiction strikes further cut his close air support. His American backers were urging him to go on the defensive as a means of aiding peace negotiations to end the Laotian Civil War. Yet the North Vietnamese were poised on the brink of victory; they had at least two more months dry weather for staging their attacks on Long Tieng, and they held the entire Plain of Jars for a staging area. To survive, the Hmong guerrillas had to at least wage limited spoiling offensives. Not only that, the Hmong Council of Elders had to be reassured that he was still fighting, lest the Elders provoke a migration of the community away from the war.

On 18 April 1971, two battalions from two Hmong Groupement Mobiles (GMs) pushed 15 kilometers southeast from Ban Pa Dong to settle upon Pha Phai. In the midst of all this, Thai mercenary units still had to be rotated. On 20 April, two fresh Thai battalions, Bataillon Commando 608 (BC 608) and Bataillon Commando 609 (BC 609), relieved the troops at Hill 1663. At Phou Long Mat, two fresh battalions, BC 603 and BC 607, extended their position two kilometers further northwards by capturing Hill 1900 from the PAVN. On 23 April, Hmong guerrillas were landed northwest of Phou Phasai to besiege the PAVN on the hill.

By the end of April, the hilltop stronghold of Phou Phasai had fallen to the Royalist guerrillas. That same day, the PAVN ended Operation 74B.

== Aftermath ==
On 1 May 1971, GM 21 was helilifted out of Ban Pa Dong ten kilometers north to Khang Kho. On 3 May, GM 22 was lifted into Ban Pa Dong as replacements. The two guerrilla regiments were now poised to move on the Lat Sen airstrip and to link up with GM 23 to take the mountaintop positions at Phou Seu, in a repeat of Kou Kiet.

In mid-May 1971, GM 31 finally cleared the last platoon of PAVN troops from Zebra Ridge, near Long Tieng. On 21 May, it marched to Long Tieng, to be flown back to MR 3 two days later. By the end of May, the PAVN units of the 316th began to slowly recede back upon their lines of communications into North Vietnam. The 148th PAVN Regiment hung on and formed a pocket of resistance near Phousai, one of several. Some of the retreating PAVN troops subjected nearby Bouamlong to an intense but unsuccessful assault. Three Pathet Lao battalions were left to maintain a Communist presence near Bouamlong by the end of May, and the PAVN retained launching points near Long Tieng for future offensives.

In late May, Undersecretary of Defense John Irwin visited Long Tieng. While he was there, Vang Pao briefed him on an offensive being planned. Chief of Station Hugh Tovar submitted a proposal on this to Headquarters. He was advised to be circumspect, as the U.S. Senate was about to be briefed in closed session about military activities in Laos.

Vang Pao now had the month of June before the U.S. tactical air power available to him would drastically diminish. He also had problematic military politics to consider. General Creighton Abrams, U.S. Army (USA), had more clout in Washington, D.C. than General Vang Pao, Royal Lao Army (RLA). Abrams favored Vang Pao's fighting a holding action while awaiting a ceasefire. Vang Pao knew that his hodge podge irregular army of tribal guerrillas and Thai mercenaries were the last Royalist fighting forces in the Kingdom. And with a decade of experience in trying to hold fixed positions with guerrillas, he knew there was little chance L'Armee Clandestine could stand off a combined arms assault by PAVN regulars. Yet with the RLA regulars no longer waging war, L'Armee Clandestine was the Kingdom's last defense.

Vang Pao rendered lip service to Washington's desires. However, the U.S. Embassy, which actually controlled the Laotian Civil War and were closer to its realities, sympathized with Vang Pao. He sold them on the necessity for a limited counter-offensive to establish a viable defensive line. In turn, they told Washington that Vang Pao planned an "active defense". With embassy backing, he parachuted in 45 Commando Raiders to interdict the Communist supply line, Route 7. On 3 June, a battalion from GM 21 was helicoptered from Khang Kho to the base of Phou Seu to attack that Communist strongpoint. Eight other Hmong guerrilla battalions swept north and east onto the Plain, capturing Communist supply caches.

By 12 June, the hilltop position at Phou Louang had been captured by GM 22, and a fire support base set up on its summit. BC 604 and two 105 mm howitzers were airlifted in to extend the artillery's range onto the Plain to the northwest. GM 22 joined GM 21 to overrun the village and airstrip at Lat Sen. Bataillon Guerrilla 224 (BG 224) was lifted in to occupy Lat Sen. GM 22 continued through Lat Sen to Phou Theung, which was vacant of Communist troops. Two 105 mm howitzers were airlifted into the base of Phou Theung to support an assault. However, on 18 June, a PAVN infantry counterattack destroyed the guns. The PAVN then lapsed into inactivity.

On 24 June, BC 609 was transferred via air from Hill 1663 to Phou Theung, freeing GM 22 to move eastward to interdict Route 4. GM 21 and BG 224 were directed eight kilometers northeastward to occupy Lat Houang and the adjacent intersection of Routes 4 and 5. The newly formed Groupement Mobile 24 (GM 24), accompanied by CIA adviser George Bacon, was committed and ended its sweep by occupying Phou Seu on 29 June 1971. Three days later another newly trained unit, Bataillon Commando 610 (BC 610), garrisoned the twin peaks.

== Results ==
At this point, Vang Pao's limited offensive had extended his defensive positions to the edge of the Plain, with artillery fire reaching out onto the Plain. Phou Theung had been captured without seeking agreed upon advance approval from Henry Kissinger; he was informed that Vang Pao had only given notice of that offensive move after it was in progress. Nevertheless, both the State Department and CIA Headquarters were uneasy about King Sisavang Vatthana and Prime Minister Souvanna Phouma pushing Vang Pao into an unacceptably risky offensive.
