= Operation Strength II =

- Part of Laotian Civil War, Vietnam War
Date	6–31 March 1972
Location	Plain of Jars, Laos
Result	Diversion attempt by the Kingdom of Laos fails

Belligerents
Kingdom of Laos; Supported by: United States: CIA	North Vietnam

Commanders and leaders
(Kingdom of Laos) Vang Pao (Kingdom of Laos) Bounphone Marthepharak	Unknown

Units involved
(Kingdom of Laos) Mobile Group 21 (Kingdom of Laos) Auto Defense Choc of Mobile Group 27 (Kingdom of Laos) Mobile Group 22 (Kingdom of Laos) Mobile Group 24 (United States) Pilatus PC-6 Porters	Unknown

Operation Strength II (6–31 March 1972) was a Royalist military offensive of the Laotian Civil War. It was devised as another diversion in the mode of the original Operation Strength. Planned as a pincer movement on the Plain of Jars, Operation Strength II's beginning was grossly hampered by combat refusals and desertions from one of its two task forces. Loss of tactical air support as the Easter Offensive began in South Vietnam also weakened the Laotian effort. In any event, neither pincer did much toward its goal of distracting the People's Army of Vietnam from its attempts to overrun the strategic guerrilla base at Long Tieng and end the war.

== Overview ==
From the moment the Kingdom of Laos was founded in 1953, it harbored a Communist insurrection. The United States government supported the kingdom with military aid. As part of this aid, the Central Intelligence Agency (CIA) raised a "Secret Army" of Hmong hill tribesmen to oppose the invading People's Army of Vietnam (PAVN). General Vang Pao led his L'Armee Clandestine in a series of guerrilla campaigns against the PAVN, beginning in 1961.

== Background ==
Operation Strength II was a followup to the preceding Operation Strength, which was fought against the advice of the Royalists' American backers. The original Operation Strength cut across the rear of the People's Army of Vietnam (PAVN) when they assaulted Long Tieng in Military Region 2 (MR 2).

The Operation Strength diversionary attack was launched from Boumalong in the north while the main assault struck northwards from Ban Pa Dong. A BLU-82 superbomb served as a secondary distraction. Having drawn 11 of the 22 attacking Communist battalions back into their own rear area, the Royalists withdrew after suffering light casualties. The Operation Strength feints into the PAVN rear area sapped the vigor from the ongoing Campaign Z.

Even before Operation Strength ended on 17 March, Strength II was being planned. By 6 March, General Vang Pao had withdrawn five of his regiment-sized Groupement Mobiles (GMs) from the first Operation Strength. He planned two columns for the Strength II attack—Task Force Alpha and Task Force Bravo.

== Operation ==
On 14 March 1972, GM 21 was moved to Bouamlong as the first unit assigned to Task Force Alpha. Two more regiments, GM 31 and GM 33, were due to arrive the next day from Pha Khao. However, their colonel advised his Central Intelligence Agency (CIA) case officer these troops had long since served longer than their scheduled 60-day tour of duty in MR 2, and that they were unwilling to fight.

The CIA Chief of Station persuaded the Commander in Chief of the Royal Lao Army, Lieutenant General Bounphone Marthepharak, to fly in and address the 2,000 mutineers. When he stood before them, they began clattering the charging handles of their M16 rifles as though loading them. However, his patriotic harangue aroused them to cheers, and the first few 50-man helicopter loads of troops loaded for deployment and left. The general left on his helicopter to meet the airlifted troops at Bouamlong. The weather turned bad, grounding further helilifts. Half of GM 31 deserted; more than that abandoned GM 33. With half the troops gone, the off and on mutineers were disarmed and flown to the training base at Seno.

On 18 March, the reinforced GM 21 moved out to attack the Communist held road junction of Routes 7 and 71; a successful attack would sever a major Communist supply line. On the 19th, the disaffected troops from MR 3 began firing on passing Air America Pilatus PC-6 Porters. During the next week, GM 21 led the rebels to within three kilometers of their objective. On 30 March, they were joined by the Auto Defense Choc militia of GM 27. The PAVN response was tepid; they stationed two battalions as a blocking force to Task Force Alpha.

Task Force Bravo, consisting of GMs 22 and 24, did not move until 20 March. They marched west from atop Phou Gnouan. Within the week, they reached a point seven kilometers from PAVN-held Phongasavan. However, there was no Communist counter move. The task force not only faced little opposition, it accomplished very little.

== Aftermath ==
The PAVN siege of the vital Long Tieng base and its 20 Alternate air strip continued despite Operation Strength II. On 18 March 1972, the North Vietnamese took the refugee center at Sam Thong, near the guerrilla base. A force from the PAVN 165th Regiment pushed Thai mercenary Bataillon Commando 616 (BC 616) from helicopter landing pad Charlie Charlie on western Skyline Ridge on 19 March. The Vietnamese 335th Independent Regiment held the center of the ridgeline and its landing pads. Despite the diversionary attacks, of Strength II, with these Vietnamese troops perched overlooking Long Tieng, the 316th Division and 866th Independent Regiment were also poised for an assault to overrun the guerrilla base.

To forestall this, the Royalists counter-attacked the Communist positions on Skyline Ridge. A pair of Thai battalions attacked its summit in a pincer movement, while a third one drove up the western slope to capture landing pad Charlie Bravo overlooking the Sam Thong-Long Tieng road. An abortive armored attack on 29 March by Communist T-34s nevertheless succeeded in driving the Thais from Charlie Bravo.

The two Thai battalions besieging the summit were reinforced by a battalion apiece on 31 March. Fighting continued into April. At about the 24th, a unit of Royalist Commando Raiders failed in an attempt to capture the summit of Skyline Ridge. B-52 strikes were called in on the Communist positions. On 28 April, the Commando Raiders stormed the summit while being covered by an AC-119 Stinger gunship; they overran the last six PAVN soldiers atop Skyline Ridge.

== Results ==
Operation Strength II failed as a diversionary attack, as it attracted very little response from the Communists. Part of the reason for its failure was the dearth of tactical air power available; the Easter Offensive in South Vietnam was absorbing the U.S. Air Force's bombing efforts from 30 March onwards.

A downscale diversionary effort began. A company of Royalist troops would be airlifted to a hilltop between the poised Communists and the battered Royalist main forces. When the Communists were fully prepared to attack that company, it would be removed, and another company inserted elsewhere in similar circumstances. The constant chase and follow by the Communists tied up entire battalions.

The Royalist guerrillas still held Long Tieng. They had recaptured the crucial high ground of Skyline Ridge.

== Bibliography ==
- Ahern, Thomas L. Jr. (2006), Undercover Armies: CIA and Surrogate Warfare in Laos. Center for the Study of Intelligence. Classified control no. C05303949.
- Anthony, Victor B. and Richard R. Sexton (1993). The War in Northern Laos. Command for Air Force History. OCLC 232549943.
- Castle, Timothy N. (1993). At War in the Shadow of Vietnam: U.S. Military Aid to the Royal Lao Government 1955–1975. ISBN 0-231-07977-X.
- Conboy, Kenneth and James Morrison (1995). Shadow War: The CIA's Secret War in Laos. Paladin Press. ISBN 0-87364-825-0.
- Stuart-Fox, Martin (2008) Historical Dictionary of Laos. Scarecrow Press. ISBN 0810864118, ISBN 978-0-81086-411-5.
