= Operation Maharat =

Military offensive of the Royal Lao Government aimed at communist insurrectionists

- Part of Campaign Z, Laotian Civil War
Date	30 December 1971 – 16 March 1972
Location	Route 13 and Route 7 junction at Sala Phoun Khoun, Laos
Result	Decisive Royal Lao victory
Territorial changes	Royal Lao Forces occupy Sala Phoun Khoun

Belligerents
Kingdom of Laos; Forces Armées Neutralistes	(Laos) Pathet Lao; Patriotic Neutralists

Units involved
Bataillon Voluntaires 25; 11th Brigade; Bataillon Voluntaires 56; Bataillon Volontaires 52; Bataillon Volontaires 25; Bataillon Commando 208; Bataillon Guerrier 121; Bataillon Guerrier 122; Bataillon Guerrier 131	N/A

Operation Maharat (30 December 1971–16 March 1972) was a military offensive of the Royal Lao Government aimed at Communist insurrectionists. At stake was the sole road junction in northern Laos well in the rear of Royalist troops fighting in Campaign Z. On 30 December 1971, the garrison of a Royal Lao Army artillery battery and two Forces Armées Neutralistes battalions was besieged by an attacking force of Pathet Lao and Patriotic Neutralists. On 21 January 1972, the Royalists were reinforced by 11th Brigade, then overrun. The Communists spread north and south along Route 13 over a 110 km (68 mi) stretch. A Royalist counter-attack on 16 March 1972 would find both Route 13 and the intersection vacated.

== Overview ==
The road network built by the French while they controlled the Kingdom of Laos was a minimal one. They extended Routes 7 and 9 from the Vietnamese coast into the interior of Laos. These east–west roads connected with the only Laotian north–south road, Route 13. Route 7 dead-ended into Route 13 approximately midway between Luang Prabang and Vientiane. It was the only road junction in the entirety of central northern Laos. The French intent was to link Laos with Vietnam, which it had also colonized.

When the French granted Laos independence in 1954, a Vietnamese invasion had already taken place, and a Laotian communist insurgency had begun. Thus the Laotian Civil War burgeoned into being.

== Background ==
As Campaign Z raged along Route 7, a separate engagement behind the Royalist forces being attacked threatened their rear area. Route 13 intersected with Route 7 at Sala Phoun Khoun. Route 13 ran north–south and connected Vientiane to Luang Prabang; Route 7 branched off to cross the Plain of Jars (PDJ) to Dien Ben Phu, Vietnam. Both roads were the only ground lines of communication available. Recognizing the importance of Sala Phou Khoun, the Royal Lao Government (RLG) stationed an artillery battery and two battalions of volunteers to defend it against Communist attack—Bataillon Voluntaires 25 (BV 25) and Bataillon Voluntaires 56 (BV 56).

== Operations ==
On 30 December 1971, while Campaign Z raged eastwards of Sala Phou Khoun, Communist forces attacked the road junction. Pathet Lao (PL) troops, with their allied Patriotic Neutralists, besieged the Royal Lao Army (RLA) artillery battery and its protective battalions of Forces Armées Neutralistes (FAN) volunteers.

Having fought over this ground before in Operation Triangle, the RLA General Staff was familiar with the terrain as they began Operation Maharat (Operation King). In mid-January, they ordered their 11th Brigade to march northward along Route 13 from Vientiane. When the brigade reached the town of Vang Vieng, it was helicoptered the rest of the way to the road junction. They no sooner arrived than the Communists overran them on 21 January 1972. The Royalists and their FAN allies scattered into the wilderness, abandoning their four 105mm howitzers.

The victorious Communists spread both north and south along Route 13. On the morning of 22 January 1972, they struck some 44 km (27 mi) south of the 7/13 junction at Moung Kassy, bombarding it with 122 mm rockets. On 31 January, Communist forces occupied Kiu Kacham, 67 km (42 mi) north of the intersection.

By the time the Royalists decided to counterattack the Communists along Route 13, it was early March and a fresh battle was being waged on the Plain of Jars. The revival of Operation Maharat would depend on converging columns along the highway and a heliborne insertion of Royalist guerrillas near the road junction.

The Military Region 5 Royalist column that left Vientiane consisted of a mixture of RLA and FAN forces. The RLA component contained Bataillon Volontaires 52 (BV 52), Bataillon Volontaires 56 (BV 56), some mobile artillery, and two armored cars. The FAN portion of the attack force was Bataillon Volontaires 25 (BV 25) and Bataillon Commando 208 (BC 208). The four battalions and their accompanying support slowly trundled north toward Sala Phou Khoun.

North of Sala Phou Khoun at Luang Prabang, Military Region 1 mustered a contingent of Commando Raiders and three guerrilla battalions—Bataillon Guerrier 121 (BG 121), Bataillon Guerrier 122 (BG 122), and Bataillon Guerrier 131 (BG 131). On 10 March 1972, BG 131 was lifted to the top of Phou Chia, 30 km (19 mi) west of the 7/13 junction. Before dawn on 15 March, 80 Commando Raiders were landed at Xieng Ngeun on Route 13, some 39 km (24 mi) north of Kiu Kacham. The truck convoy carrying BG 121 arrived at 0700 hours to relieve the Raiders. The Raiders promptly reboarded helicopters and flew to move into an unoccupied Kiu Kacham. Again, BG 121 followed them into town. Meanwhile, BG 122 and the mobile artillery moved south into Xieng Ngeun.

On 16 March, the Commando Raiders were helilifted to a landing zone 9 km (6 mi) east of Kiu Kacham, to be joined by BG 121. BG 122 was also lifted to a new location into a hilltop position overlooking Sala Phou Khoun from the west. They walked down to an unoccupied intersection and greeted the convoys of troops driving in from both north and south.

== Result ==
The Royal Lao Government now controlled the strategic Sala Phou Khoun intersection in the rear of its troops on the Plain of Jars.
