= Longchaeng district =

Longchaeng
- District
- Longchaeng district
- Location of Longchaeng district in Laos
- Country: Laos
- Province: Xaisomboun

Population (2015)
  - Total: 8,834
- Time zone: UTC+7 (ICT)

Longchaeng (Lao: ເມືອງລ້ອງແຈ້ງ, pronounced [mɯ́aŋ lɔ̂ːŋ tɕɛ̂ːŋ]) is a district of Xaisomboun province, Laos.

== History ==
During the Laotian Civil War, Long Tieng served as an airbase operated by the Central Intelligence Agency of the United States.

In November 2015, unrest broke out in the province, killing three soldiers and three civilians. The Lao government imposed a curfew in the north-central part of the province in early-December, but in January 2016 a bomb was set off at a road construction site near Pha Nok Nok village in the district, killing two Chinese officials and injuring another. On 30 December, a bomb had previously been defused at Namphanoy village along the same road. As a result, on 16 February 2016, Major General Thongloy Silivong, a military officer who is the former chief of the National Defense Academy, was appointed the governor of Xaisomboun Province to tighten control.
