= Special Zone of Xaisomboun =

Coordinates: 18°49′01″N 103°05′10″E

- Special zone
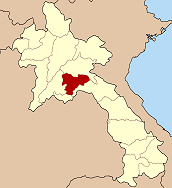
- Country: Laos
- Capital: Ban Mouang Cha

Area
  - Total: 7,105 km^{2} (2,743 sq mi)

Population
  - Estimate (2004): 70,600
  - Density: 10/km^{2} (26/sq mi)
- Geocode: 1800
- ISO 3166 code: LA-XN

Xaisomboun (also Saysomboun, Lao: ໄຊສົມບູນ) was a special zone (khetphiset) of Laos, located in the north of the country, near the capital Vientiane. The special zone was created 1994 by the military, with area split off from the provinces Vientiane and Xiangkhoang, in order to control and suppress the postwar Hmong resistance. It was officially dissolved on January 13, 2006, although the term continues to be used.

== Geography ==
The special zone of Xaisomboun is in a mountainous region south of the Plain of Jars. It contains the tallest mountain in Laos, Phou Bia, and the protected area Phou Khao Khouay.

== Military control ==
The area of the special zone of Xaisomboun was once controlled by the Hmong "Secret Army" and included the military bases Long Tieng and Sam Thong; today it is controlled by the Lao People's Army (LPA), which have put pressure on Hmong insurgents. Into 2016, the Laotian government continued to deny access to officials from the European Union and the United Nations, despite reports of killings by the military, including killings using chemical weapons. In 2017, Barbara Lochbihler MEP submitted a parliamentary question to the High Representative of the Union for Foreign Affairs and Security Policy, addressing the humanitarian challenges faced by the Hmong in Xaisomboun. She highlighted issues such as restricted access for international officials, reports of violence, and the lack of European Union development assistance reaching the area, seeking clarity on the European Union's actions to address the crisis and engage with the community directly.

In 2021, the Unrepresented Nations and Peoples Organization (UNPO) condemned the treatment and military violence against the ChoaFa people living in the special zone of Xaisomboun, as well as "intimidation, harassment and persecution of human rights defenders, journalists, and members of minority communities through arbitrary arrests and enforced disappearances".

== Administrative divisions ==
The province was originally made up of the following districts:

1. Hom (18-03)
2. Longsane (18-04)
3. Phun (18-05)
4. Thathom (18-02)
5. Anouvong (18-01)

== History ==
- 23 September 2004 – The districts Hom and Longsane were merged. The new district, still named Hom, was reassigned to Vientiane Province.
- 27 June 2005 – The districts Phun and Xaisomboun were merged, with the new district still named Xaisomboun.
- 13 January 2006 – Xaisomboun District was reassigned to Vientiane Province, while Thathome District went to Xiangkhoang Province. Therefore, the special area of Xaisomboun was dissolved.

== See also ==
- Xaisomboun province
