= May Song Vang =

American Hmong community leader and activist

May Song Vang (February 5, 1951 – August 5, 2013) was an American Hmong community leader and activist. She was the widow of General Vang Pao, a former member of the Royal Lao Army and prominent Hmong American leader, who died in 2011. May Song Vang became a more prominent symbol of the Hmong American community in California and the rest of the United States after the death of her husband.

== Biography ==
Vang was born to parents, Nhia Chou Moua and Yee Lee, on February 5, 1951, in the northern village of Phou Dou, Laos, French Indochina. She was her family's fourth of thirteen children born in the small farming village. Her father discouraged her and other girls from attending school. However, she defied his wishes and enrolled at Sisawavong Medical University in Vientiane. She completed her studies and became a midwife, nurse, and physician assistant. In 2013, the Fresno Bee, an American newspaper in California, called her a "pioneer for women in her home country of Laos" for receiving her education.

May Song first met her future husband, then military commander Vang Pao, while she was treating injured soldiers. She married Vang Pao in 1973, becoming his youngest wife. The couple moved to the United States following the 1975 Communist takeover of Laos. They initially moved to Montana before ultimately settling in California. Vang Pao and May Song Vang were viewed by many Hmongs as leaders who helped them settle in the United States. May Song Vang was especially seen as a benevolent leader by the Hmong community of California's San Joaquin Valley, a major center of Hmong American life. Though she resided in Orange County, California, May Song Vang traveled to the San Joaquin Valley at least once or twice per month for more than twenty years to attend Hmong cultural and political events and other activities. She encouraged students to stay in school and attend higher education, using the motto "Education is the key to success."

General Vang Pao died from pneumonia on January 6, 2011. As his widow, May Song Vang, already a leading figure in the community, took on a more prominent role in Hmong American affairs. She mediated and resolved disputes within the Hmong American community.

In 2012, she attended the official dedication of Vang Pao Elementary School in the southeast section of Fresno, California. May Song Vang had a major role in the establishment of the school, named in husband's honor. She led drive to obtain 20,000 signatures to build the elementary school. She was joined at the dedication ceremony by other local dignitaries, including Fresno Mayor Ashley Swearengin.

May Song Vang also founded the General Vang Pao Foundation in 2012. Based in Fresno, the foundation supports economical disadvantaged Hmong families.

May Song Vang died from cancer at the UC Irvine Medical Center in Orange, California, on August 5, 2013, at the age of 62. She had first been diagnosed with cancer in 2005. She was survived by her three sons - Chu Long Vang, Chu Leng Vang and ChiNeng Vang - and seven grandchildren. According to the Asian American Press, she also had fifteen stepsons and five additional stepdaughters due to her husband's other, multiple marriages.

A traditional Hmong funeral was held at the Fresno Fairgrounds from August 23 until August 26, 2013. More than 25,000 people attended the three-day funeral. According to Blong Xiong, the President of the Fresno city council, May Song Vang was the last major Hmong figure from the Vietnam War era.
