= Operation Raindance =

- Part of Laotian Civil War; Vietnam War
Date	17 March – 7 April 1969
Location	Plain of Jars in northeastern Laos
Result	U.S. Air Force interdiction bombing campaign to support Royalist guerrillas

Belligerents
Kingdom of Laos; Supported by United States	North Vietnam; Supported by: Soviet Union; People's Republic of China

Units involved
U.S. Air Force; Royal Lao Air Force; Raven Forward Air Controllers; Royalist guerrillas	Four PAVN battalions

Casualties and losses
Unknown	Unknown; Extensive destruction of materiel

Operation Raindance was a military operation of the Laotian Civil War, staged from 17 March to 7 April 1969. It was launched by the U.S. Air Force (USAF) in support of Hmong guerrillas raised by the Central Intelligence Agency (CIA). As the guerrillas were being pressured by communist troops pushing to within ten kilometers of their main bases, the aerial campaign was planned to cause a pullback by the pressing communists.

As the first well-targeted aerial campaign in Laos, Operation Raindance's 65 strikes per day gained such great results that it was extended indefinitely. Even after its "ending" on 7 April, the interdiction continued; eventually, it would be dubbed Operation Stranglehold. In all, it was the most successful Lao air strike operation to date. Among communist losses to air were two tanks, two BTR-40 armored cars, 32 other vehicles, 28 antiaircraft guns, 28 bunkers, and six gun positions. Bombing caused over 1,500 secondary explosions of munitions, and destroyed over 2,000 storage caches. In one case, a cavern full of munitions exploded and burned for 16 hours.

Hmong forces who followed in the path blasted by the bombers captured and destroyed 300 tons of medical supplies. They ruined a 1,000 bed medical facility they found hidden underground, along with operating rooms and X-ray machines. The three light battalions of guerrillas withdrew in the face of the imminent arrival of four heavily armed People's Army of Vietnam (PAVN) battalions. However, the advantages gained in Raindance would shortly be nullified by the communists' first-ever rainy season offensive.

== Overview ==
After World War II, France fought the First Indochina War to retain French Indochina. Following the French defeat, the Kingdom of Laos gained its independence with Laotian neutrality established in the 1954 Geneva Accords. When France withdrew most of its military in conformity with the treaty, the United States filled the vacuum with purportedly civilian paramilitary instructors. A North Vietnamese-backed communist insurrection began as early as 1949. Invading during the opium harvest season of 1953, it settled in northeastern Laos adjacent to the border of the Democratic Republic of Vietnam.

As the Laotian Civil War flared, the CIA established a secret guerrilla army in the Plain of Jars. Interposed between the communist settlement around Xam Neua and the Royal Lao Government in Vientiane, the Hmong military irregulars fought to hold on to their traditional territory. After the failure and defeat of Operation Pigfat, the communists had overrun the Plain of Jars to within ten kilometers of the guerrillas' main base at Long Chieng.

== Background ==
Hmong General Vang Pao not only suffered the reverses of his failed offensive, and the loss of a forward airfield at Muang Soui; his defensive position was soon further weakened by Vietnamese communist attacks. The communist wet season offensive was unprecedented in Laos. Now, faced with the possibility of a final guerrilla defeat, American Ambassador William H. Sullivan and Lao Prime Minister Souvanna Phouma loosened the restrictive rules of engagement inherent in the Operation Barrel Roll bombing campaign. For the first time, the CIA, the Embassy air attaché and USAF planners jointly planned a strike package of 345 targets, complete with supporting documentation on aerial photographs.

== Operation ==
The USAF proposed a three-day bombing campaign against communist sanctuaries on the eastern Plain of Jars. It was posited that communists would withdraw back to protect their bases, thus relieving the pressure on the Hmong. A request for 80 sorties per day was lodged with the air force. Sixty sorties per day would be allocated to direction by Raven Forward Air Controllers; twenty would strike communist lines of communication, Route 7. Approval came for 65 missions daily. Prime Minister Souvanna Phouma lifted most bombing restrictions on the Plain of Jars.

The USAF initiated Operation Rain Dance on 17 March 1969 with immediate success. The sanctuaries having been previously held off-limits for air strikes, the communists did little to hide or disguise their supply depots. By the close of 18 March, so many secondary explosions and petroleum fires were reported that Seventh Air Force decided to continue the campaign "as long as resources are available, lucrative targets exist, and weather permits". By the close of 20 March, USAF had flown 261 sorties; the Royal Lao Air Force added 43 T-28 strikes. Bomb damage assessments reported included 486 secondary explosions of munitions, 570 buildings and 28 bunkers destroyed, 288 fires, six gun positions, and a 105mm howitzer. By 25 March, 192 of the original 345 targets had been systematically destroyed.

After the interdiction strikes began, the Hmong irregulars moved south from the Plain of Jars on 23 March. Some guerrillas emerged from nearby Lima Site bases to cut Route 7; failing that, they settled for sniping at communist resupply. Other Royalist forces threatened another communist supply line, Route 4. Forces Armées Neutralistes operating in the hills around Muang Soui were poised on the Lima Site 19 mountaintop position southwest of it by 30 March. Simultaneously, Neutralist forces pushed out from Muang Soui.

The USAF deemed Raindance such a success they extended it until 7 April. By that date, 730 air sorties had struck the communists. Bomb damage assessment reported amounted to 1,512 storage caches struck, resulting in 765 secondary explosions from munitions and petroleum products. General Vang Pao now regained the confidence in air power that had been shaken in Operation Pigfat when his air strike allotment was slashed. Operation Raindance was the most successful aerial campaign flown in Laos to date.

== Aftermath ==
=== Continuing success ===
Even as Raindance closed down, the flow of air power continued. With 150 fresh targets added to the remainder of the original target package, an allotment of 60 strike sorties per day was requested. Vang Pao had an ongoing promise of 50 USAF air strikes per day to support his guerrillas. The air actions continued through April, with great results. On 21 April, a Bullpup missile detonated a cavern storing fuel and munitions; the near-simultaneous eruption of a village about a kilometer away proved they were linked via tunnel. The cave complex would burn and explode for 16 hours, while the village disappeared.

Vang Pao moved three battalions back into a fertile rice growing area, the Muong Ngan valley. Next, he received reinforcements from the Royal Lao Army. With the 103rd Bataillon Parachutiste (103rd Parachute Battalion) added to the irregulars, the combined force moved down from their hill position to Phonsavan on 29 April. In the ruins of the town smashed by artillery and air strikes, they found two BTR-40 Armored Cars, 18 other vehicles, 12 37mm antiaircraft guns, and a 75mm howitzer, which they destroyed. Continuing through town two kilometers to the northwest, on the north side of Route 4 they uncovered a cave complex crammed with pre-positioned communist supplies. Behind barrels of rocks barricading cave entrances against air attack, they found 300 tons of medical supplies. Another cave contained hospital beds for 1,000 patients. Still another contained over a mile of supplies within it; as the cache was too big to ruin, local Buddhist monks were convinced to lay a curse upon it so the superstitious Pathet Lao would not reclaim the goods. There were operating theaters; one had a pair of X-ray machines. Air America flew in a cargo of varied explosives to destroy the goods. The 1,000 Hmong troops occupied Phonsavan for the first time since 1962; they did not have to fire a shot.

=== Withdrawal ===
Within two weeks, road watch reconnaissance teams began to report heavy inbound communist traffic. By mid-May, it was known that three PAVN battalions were en route from Vietnam with orders to retake Muang Soui. Communist troops were also being withdrawn from their probe against the guerrilla main bases to pressure the Hmong guerrillas. A pincer attack on Phonsavan was threatened, with prongs poised south and northeast of the town. On 21 May 1969, the PAVN 174th Regiment knocked the irregulars from their perch on the hill north of town. The next day, one company of Royalist paratroopers tried to recapture the hill while the other held the town. On 23 May, the PAVN overran Phonsavan and the paratroopers withdrew, having suffered 200 casualties. However, even as Vang Pao gave back some of his gained ground to his enemies, the USAF followed up on Raindance with Operation Stranglehold.

=== Operation Stranglehold ===
Vang Pao intended to cut Route 7 during his withdrawal; he ordered guerrilla forays against the road from Bouamlong, San Tiau, and Sam Hong Hong. Stranglehold was a five-day air campaign to cover the Hmong retreat. The USAF devoted 50 of its 90 daily Barrel Roll flights against 75 targets. Selected targets were better hidden and defended than the Raindance targets, but it was believed their destruction would have a longer impact on events. In the event, 68 of the designated targets were struck; bomb damage reported included 296 secondary explosions of munitions and 212 fires. Two tanks, 14 trucks, and 16 antiaircraft guns were also destroyed.

When the guerrilla sweep was successfully completed by the end of May, the communists reclaimed the lost ground. However, Muang Soui was saved from assault; the USAF claimed the credit. With monsoon rains drenching the Plain, communist resupply lines were expected to be bogged down. In past rainy seasons, air operations supporting the Hmong against the communists had occurred during breaks in the weather. However, in mid June 1969, the communists launched their first ever wet season offensive, Campaign Thoan Thang. It circled behind the Hmong positions and used a tank-supported attack to conquer Moang Soui on 27 June. The Hmong were left facing an enemy that now was being supplied by an all-weather road, Route 7; the communists were still poised to strike.
