= Phou Khao Khouay =

Conservation area in Laos

Phou Khao Khouay National Park
- Phou Khao Khuay National Park
- IUCN category VI (protected area with sustainable use of natural resources)
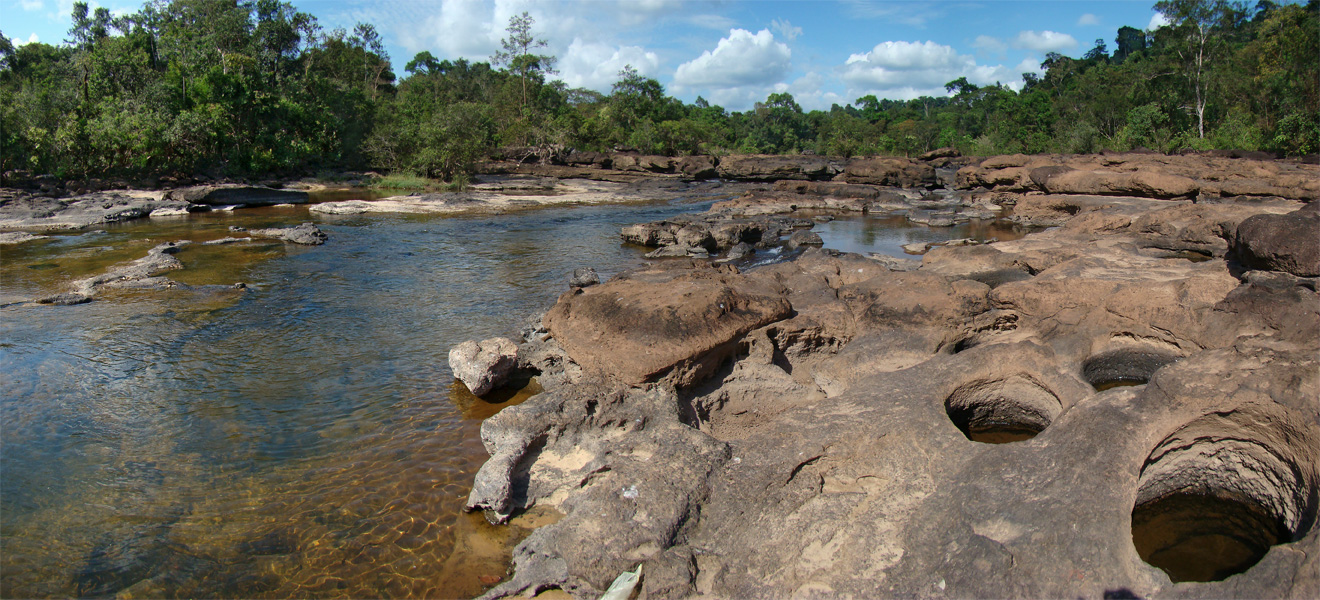

- Location within Laos
- Location: Xaisomboun, Vientiane, and Bolikhamsai provinces, Laos
- Nearest city: Vientiane
- Coordinates: 18°22′55″N 103°5′59″E
- Area: 1,920 km^{2} (740 sq mi)
- Designation: National
- Designated: 1993 National Biodiversity Conservation Area; 2021 National Park
- Governing body: Department of Forestry (DOF), Ministry of Agriculture and Forestry (MAF)

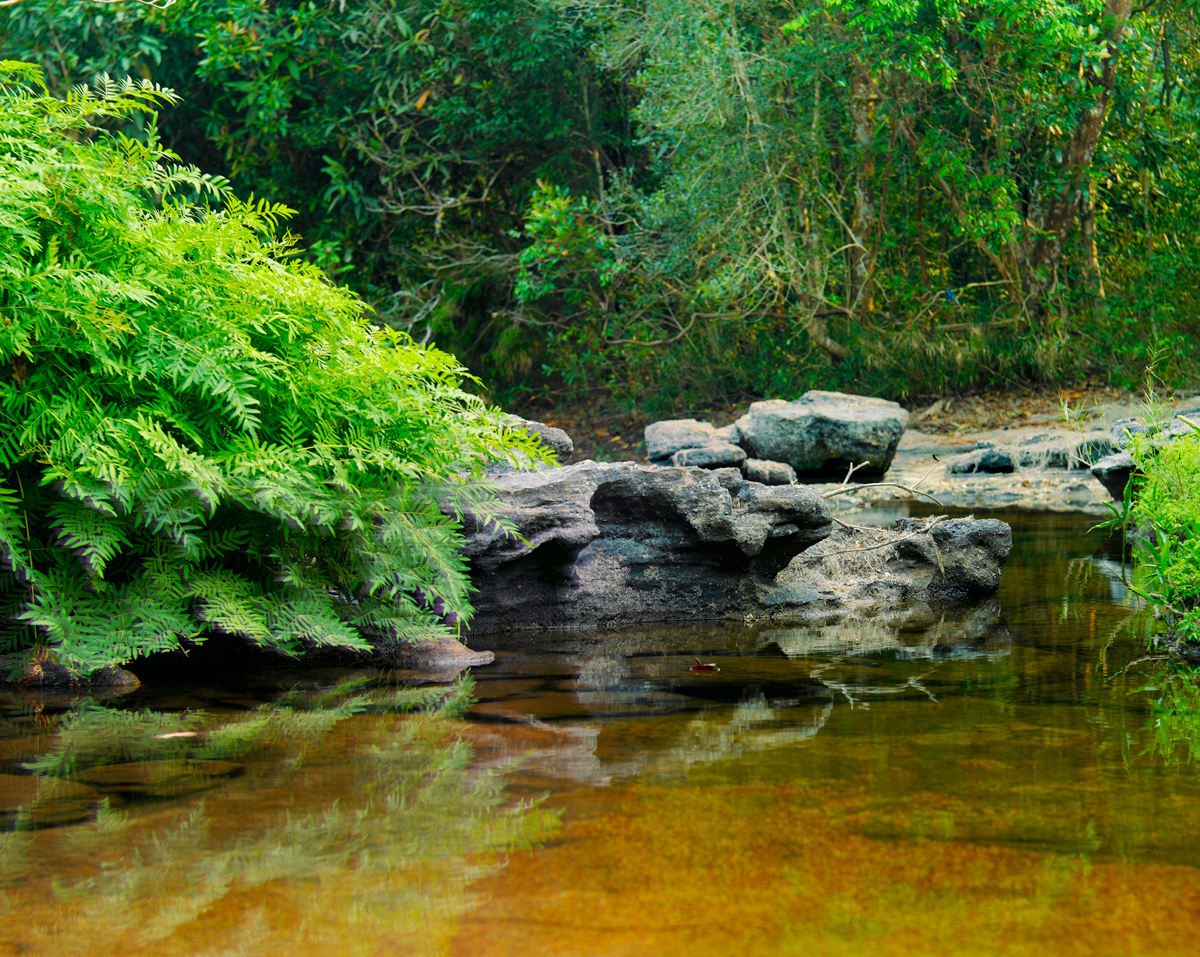
Phou Khao Khouay

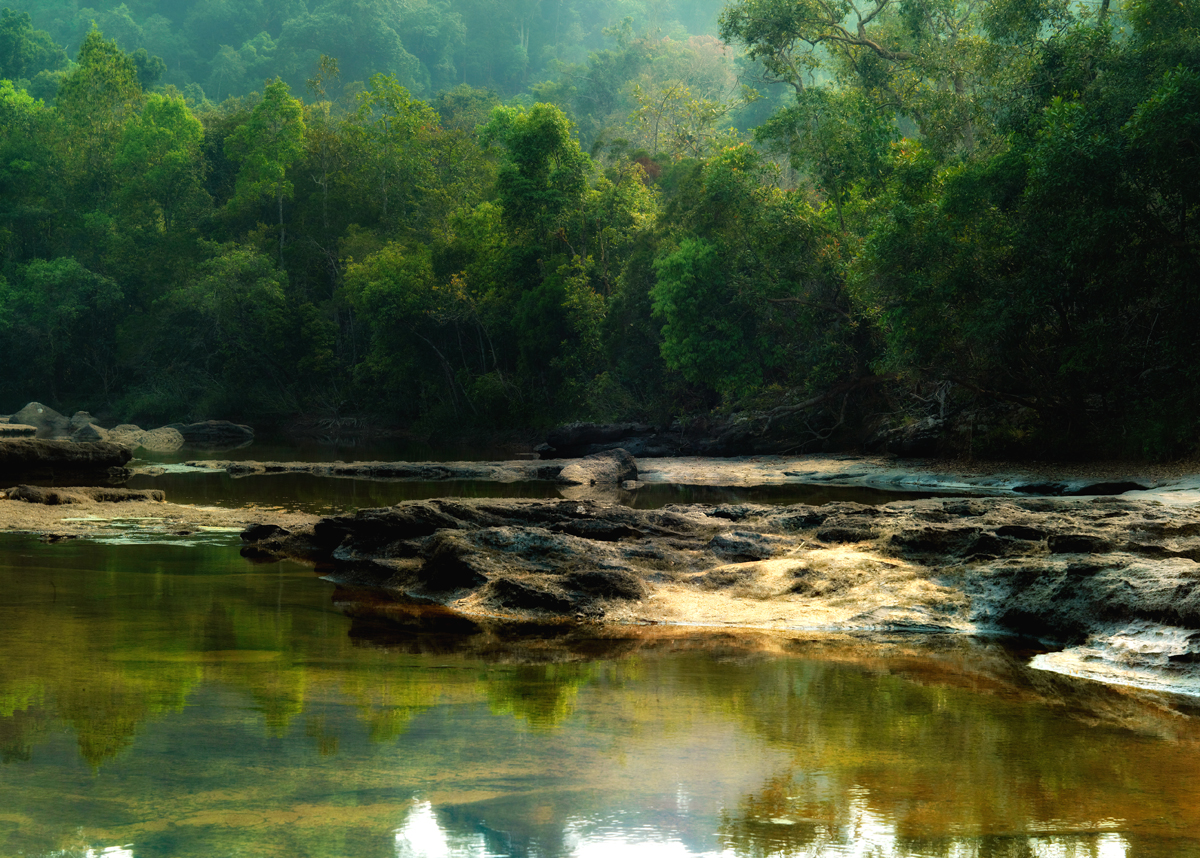
Phou Khao Khouay

Phou Khao Khouay National Park is a protected area in Laos. It is located 40 kilometres (25 mi) northeast of Vientiane. It covers an area of 1920 km^{2}, extending into Xaisomboun Province, Vientiane Prefecture, Vientiane Province, and Bolikhamsai Province. It was established on 29 October 1993 as Phou Khao Khouay National Biodiversity Conservation Area (or Phou Khao Khouay National Protected Area), and redesignated a national park in 2021. It includes a large stretch of mountain range with sandstone cliffs, river gorges and three large rivers with tributaries which flow into the Mekong River.

It has mountainous topography with elevation varying from 200 m – 1761 m. The area emerged from "uplifting and exposure of the underlying sedimentary (Indosinias schist-clay-sandstone) complex". Sandstones are also seen spread in layers. Extensive flat uplands with sandstones with hardly any soil cover are also part of the topography of the park.

The park has monsoonal climate with recorded annual rainfall of 1,936.1 mm (with higher reaches recording more rainfall). The mean annual temperature is 26.6 °C with recorded the mean maximum of 31.6 °C and the mean minimum temperature of 21.5 °C.

The forests are evergreen, Shorea mixed deciduous forest, dry dipterocarp and pine type; particularly coniferous forest, of monospecific stands of Pinus latteri, Fokienia hodgsinsii, bamboo, and fire-climax grasslands.

Animals found in the park include elephants, tigers, bears, 13 pairs of white-cheeked gibbons, langurs, reptiles, amphibians and birds. Sightings of the green peafowl have been reported near Ban Nakhay and Ban Nakhan Thoung, although it was generally once considered extinct in Laos. Conservation management has increased its population.

== See also ==
- Protected areas of Laos
