= Operation Strength (1972) =

Laotian Civil War Royalist offensive

- Part of Laotian Civil War; Vietnam War
Date	6 February – 17 March 1972
Location	Northern Laos
Result	Eleven of twenty-two People's Army of Vietnam battalions diverted from Campaign Z

Belligerents
Laos; Thailand; Supported by United States	North Vietnam

Commanders and leaders
(Laos) Vang Pao; George Bacon	

Units involved
(Laos) Groupements Mobile 21; Groupements Mobile 22; Groupements Mobile 23; Groupements Mobile 24; Groupements Mobile 27; Groupements Mobile 31; Groupements Mobile 33; Groupements Mobile 10A; Five Bataillons Commando; Royal Lao Air Force (Thailand) Thai mercenaries	148th Regiment; 174th Regiment; 209th Regiment; 165th Regiment; 141st Regiment

Operation Strength (6 February – 17 March 1972) was a Royalist military offensive of the Laotian Civil War. The attack, undertaken against the advice of his American backers by Hmong General Vang Pao, was launched across the rear of the attacking People's Army of Vietnam forces. A distracting attack was launched from Boumalong in the north while the main assault struck northwards from Ban Pa Dong. A BLU-82 superbomb served as a secondary distraction. Having drawn 11 of the 22 attacking Communist battalions back into their own rear area, the Royalists withdrew after suffering light casualties. The Operation Strength feints into the PAVN rear area sapped the vigor from the ongoing Campaign Z.

== Overview ==
The Kingdom of Laos came into being with an ongoing Communist insurrection already rampant. In response, the U.S. government—primarily the Central Intelligence Agency (CIA)—sponsored a covert army of Lao hill tribesmen to combat it. Hmong General Vang Pao led L'Armee Clandestine in a seesaw campaign against the Communists from 1960 onwards.

== Background ==
On 16 January 1972, while the latest Communist offensive still struck his troops, General Vang Pao planned his counter. He faced another three months of the dry season, during which tactical conditions favored his Communist opponents' overwhelming edge in troops; the People's Army of Vietnam (PAVN) had committed 22 battalions to the Campaign Z offensive now attacking his troops. Vang Pao planned to launch an attack northwards across the rear of his enemy's forward forces. The CIA advisers backing the Hmong commander thought the planned counter was completely unrealistic under the circumstances. If an attack were to be launched out of Ban Pa Dong on the eastern end of the string of Royalist strongholds as the general planned, his CIA advisers argued that it should counterattack to the northwest to attack the rear of the Communist troops assaulting the main Royalist Hmong guerrilla base of Long Tieng.

Nor were the local CIA officers the only ones unhappy about Vang Pao's plans. In Washington DC, his detractors, who included the State Department and Department of Defense as well as the CIA, feared a repetition of the Battle of Dien Ben Phu. The armchair generals believed that Vang Pao's irregulars should hold a defensive line shielding Long Tieng, forcing the Communists to congregate into masses that could be struck by bombing. If and when the Royalists were forced to retreat, they should give up the Long Tieng base to their foe and wage a "mobile defense" of the Vientiane plain from a new line southwest of the guerrilla bases that would shield the capital.

The touted Washington plan ignored the fact that Communist troops had long since learned not to mass where they could be struck by tactical air power. Current communist tactics saw them dispersed around the Royalist positions and concentrating their fire on a strongpoint, converging for assaults at the last moment. The proposed defense also ignored the lack of viable defensive positions on the Vientiane Plain, and the dwindling air power allotment to support Royalist operations in northern Laos.

== Royalist order of battle ==
Vang Pao decided to commit seven regimental-size Groupements Mobile (GMs) to Operation Strength. From his own troops to hand, he mustered GM 21, GM 22, GM 23, and GM 24 for a southern offensive pincer. However, these GMs were not up to strength; GM 22 had only 435 men, and GM 24 only 511, of an authorized 900 men. The latter unit supplied 120 reinforcements for GM 27, which was a makeshift unit cobbled together from Auto Defense Choc militia. The augmented GM 27 would form the northern pincer.

Additionally, the Hmong general was supplied by two GMs raised and trained in Military Region 3. GM 31 was moved forward to Ban Pa Dong on 1 February to join the two under-strength formations in the southern contingent, GMs 22 and 24, to be followed by GM 21. On 3 February, battle tested GM 33 arrived on the Plain of Jars. By now, Vang Pao had shifted about 5,000 troops to Operation Strength, while leaving some 7,000 manning the Long Tieng front. The next day, GM 33 was ferried out to Pha Khao, near Ban Pa Dong. Its troops carried a week's food, and were ordered to observe radio silence.

== Movement to contact ==
Operation Strength was launched on 6 February 1972, six days behind schedule. The southern pincer set off from Ban Pa Dong and Pha Khao as a diversion to the ongoing Campaign Z, moving north against little opposition. As they moved out, they split into three columns contending for three mountaintops. That same day, the northern pincer departed Bouamlong as a diversion to the diversion, and also met little resistance in its drive toward Nong Pet.

== Fighting begins ==
On the southern front, GMs 21 and 31 in the eastern column aimed at Phou Khe and attracted a blocking force from the 148th, 174th, and 209th Regiments. By 10 February, the Royalists had reached their objectives on the edge of the Plain of Jars. On 12 February, the Royalists managed to occupy Phou Khe. They established an ad hoc fire base of heavy weapons on the mountaintop, and posted a security unit from GM 31 to guard it. On 16 February, GM 33 reached the bottom of the central column's objective, Phou Theung; GM 33 was supported by GM 22 and some troops from GM 24.

GM 23, advised by CIA case officer Kayak, now joined GM 21 at Phou Khe. On 18 February, this eastern column moved out, tending still further east toward the Communists' rear. The next day, Communist resistance suddenly stiffened.

=== Operation Moonmark ===
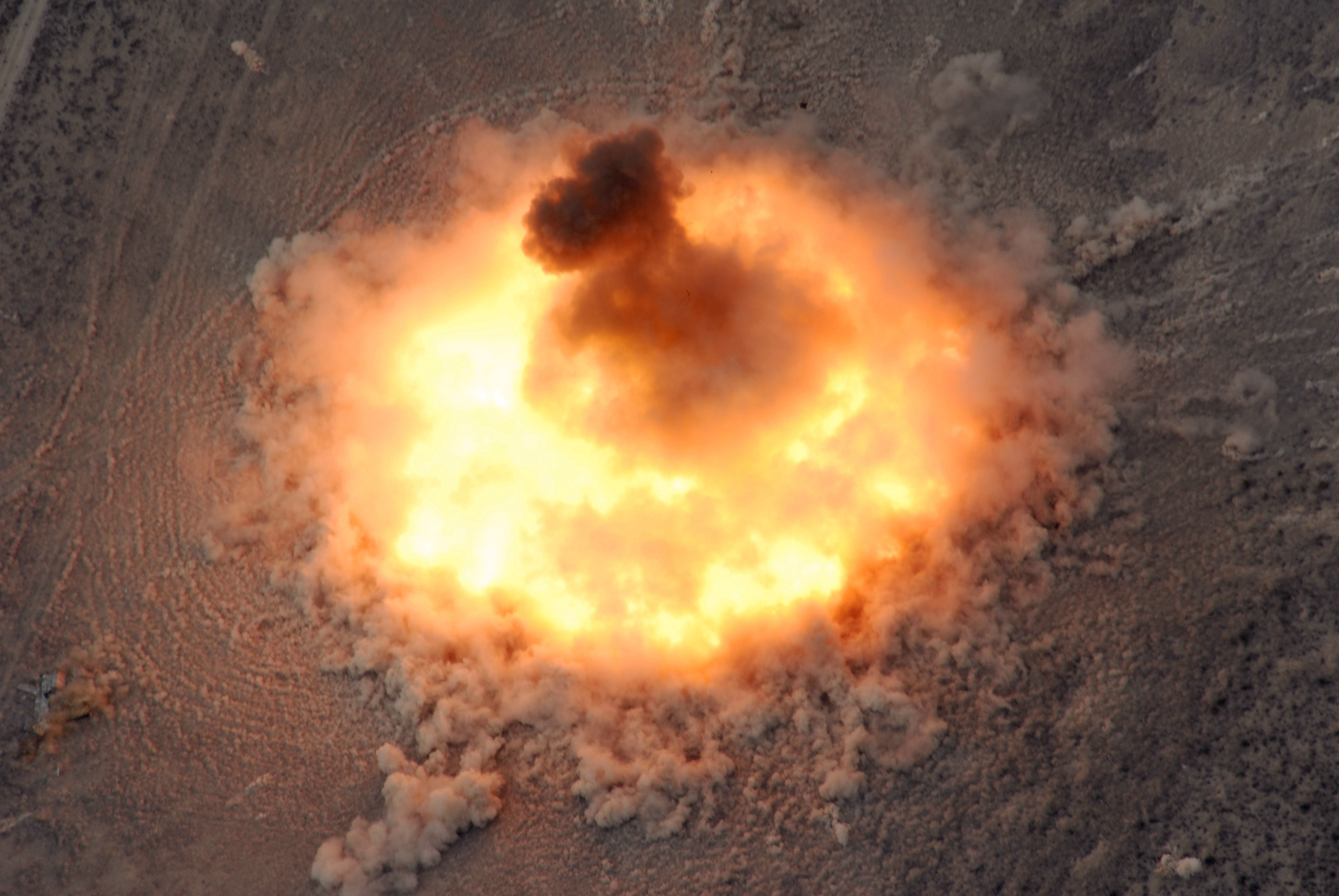
A BLU-82 15,000 pound bomb at moment of impact

The CIA's response was another distraction. To begin Operation Moonmark, the CIA arranged for the U.S. Air Force to use one of its C-130 Hercules to drop a BLU-82 bomb to blast a helicopter landing zone (HLZ). Several helicopters flew in, a team dropped into the HLZ long enough to scatter cigarette butts, old packing crates, and litter about to simulate an insertion, then were pulled out by the helicopters. For the next week, Air America Twin Otters overflew the phony HLZ dropping bogus parachutes and broadcasting helicopter racket. Thus the 15,000 lb (6,800 kilo) bomb served as a second diversion to the diversion.

== Fighting continues ==
The distraction of Operation Moonmark notwithstanding, GM 33 was forced to retreat on 23 February 1972. The fire base atop Phou Khe was removed, as GM 31 linked up with the eastern column withdrawing from Phou Leung. On 25 February, GM 10A arrived at Ban Pa Dong to anchor the Royalist retreat. By 2 March, all the Royalist forces were withdrawing, having drawn 11 battalions of PAVN troops backward from the Long Tieng front. Operation Strength was characterized as "a fantastic diversion". The rear area thrust had cost the Royalists only 29 killed, 138 wounded.

Despite the distractions of Operation Strength in their rear, the North Vietnamese still had portions of six combat-ready regiments from two divisions in offensive positions southwest of the Plain of Jars. Both divisional headquarters had been moved forward; the Communists set up the Front 74B command post northeast of Long Tieng to manage them. On 2 March, a contingent of Thai artillery arrived and shifted to a forward fire base on Skyline Ridge. At about this time, the PAVN finished constructing a new infiltration road, Route 54; they began to move infantry and artillery toward Sam Thong.

Late on 10 March 1972, three battalions of the 165th PAVN Regiment struck the old refugee relief center at Sam Thong. After dividing the Thai mercenary garrison with their initial assault, the Communists circled west under cover of darkness while firing a variety of heavy weapons at the Royalist position. In turn, two Royalist fire support bases that were within range fired artillery support for the Royalists, and a Royal Lao Air Force Douglas AC-47 Spooky also fired support. The front line Royalist battalion clung to its position until dawn. The PAVN began to fire 122mm rockets into the Royalist stronghold. An overcast rolled in, restricting Royalist air support. Just past 1200 hours, the Royalist front line gave way, with the battalion's soldiers retreating westwards and southwards. Nearby Fire Support Base Thunder fell next, less than two hours later. Under fire by Communist machine guns and mortars, the Thai gunners left their howitzers, accompanied by two more Bataillons Commando. BC 610A still remained in position on the southwest edge of the Royalist position.

However, Royalist reinforcements continued to arrive at Long Tieng. On 11 March, three more Bataillons Commando (BCs) were flown in. PAVN gunners set up a DK-82 recoilless rifle on the eastern end of Skyline Ridge and took Vang Pao's house and the 20 Alternate airstrip under fire. Intermixed Communist and Royalist troops fought bitterly, hand to hand. Communist artillery fire rained in on the battlefield; tanks set aflame continued to fire. Tactical air strikes, gunship missions, and B-52 Arclight strikes struck to support the Royalists despite the haze of battle.

On 17 March, as BC 610A and the 141st PAVN Regiment exchanged heavy weapons fire, five Communist T-34 tanks and four armored personnel carriers burst onto the Sam Thong airstrip. Dodging artillery fire being called in by a Raven Forward Air Controller overhead, the T-34's overwhelmed the Royalists' inadequate anti-tank defenses. Although one of the two T-34s that lumbered atop Royalist bunkers was destroyed by hand grenades, the other struck the battalion's command bunker. As BC 610A retreated, the Communists turned captured howitzers on Skyline Ridge despite being struck by four flights of tactical air.

== Result ==
Vang Pao had preserved his badly battered fighting force even as Operation Strength distracted the enemy. He would immediately begin turning his retreating troops toward another offensive, Operation Strength II.

== Aftermath ==
On 30 March 1972, North Vietnam openly invaded South Vietnam. On 6 April, bombing of North Vietnam resumed. Both actions drew air support from the ongoing action in northern Laos; only an occasional flight diverted by weather or circumstance was available. The PAVN forces in front of Long Tieng suffered few air assaults.
