= Xaisomboun province =

Province of Laos

Xaisomboun Province
- Province
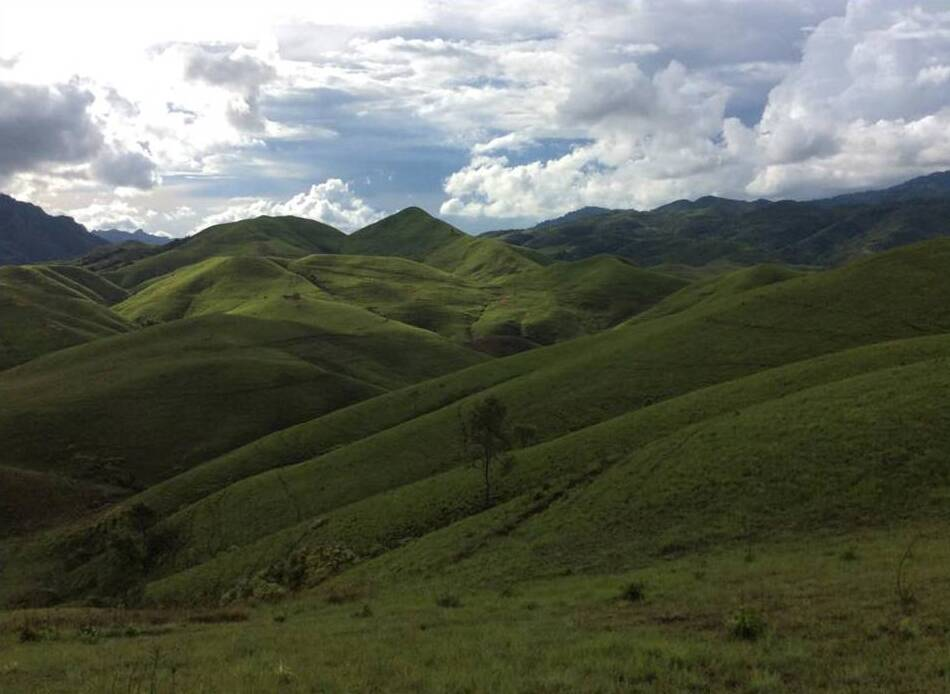

- Location of Xaisomboun province in Laos
- Coordinates: 18.9057°N 103.092°E
- Country: Laos
- Established: 13 December 2013
- Capital: Anouvong district

Area
  - Total: 8,551 km^{2} (3,302 sq mi)

Population (2020 census)
  - Total: 107,926
  - Density: 12.62/km^{2} (32.69/sq mi)
- Time zone: UTC+7 (ICT)
- ISO 3166 code: LA-XS

Xaisomboun (Lao: ໄຊສົມບູນ, pronounced [sáj.sǒm.bùːn]) is a province in central Laos, between Vientiane province and Xiangkhouang province. Xaisomboun town in Anouvong District is the economic centre. There are copper and gold mining operations at Sana Somboun.

== Geography ==
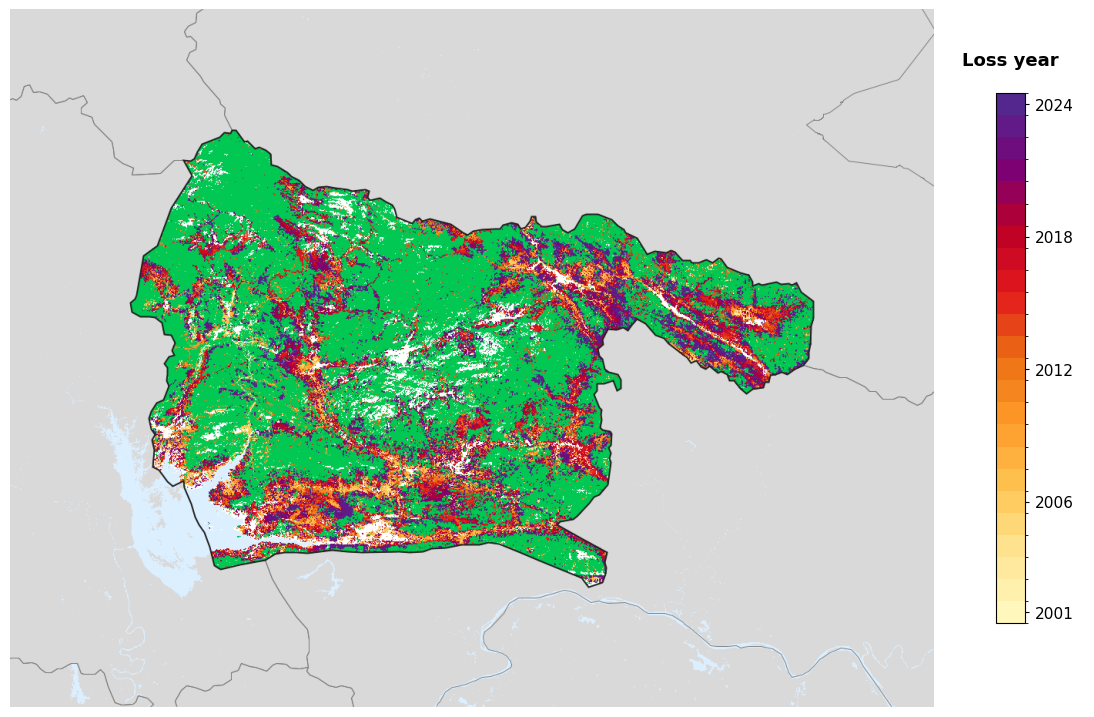
Tree-cover loss year in Xaisomboun, 2001-2024, from the Global Forest Change dataset.

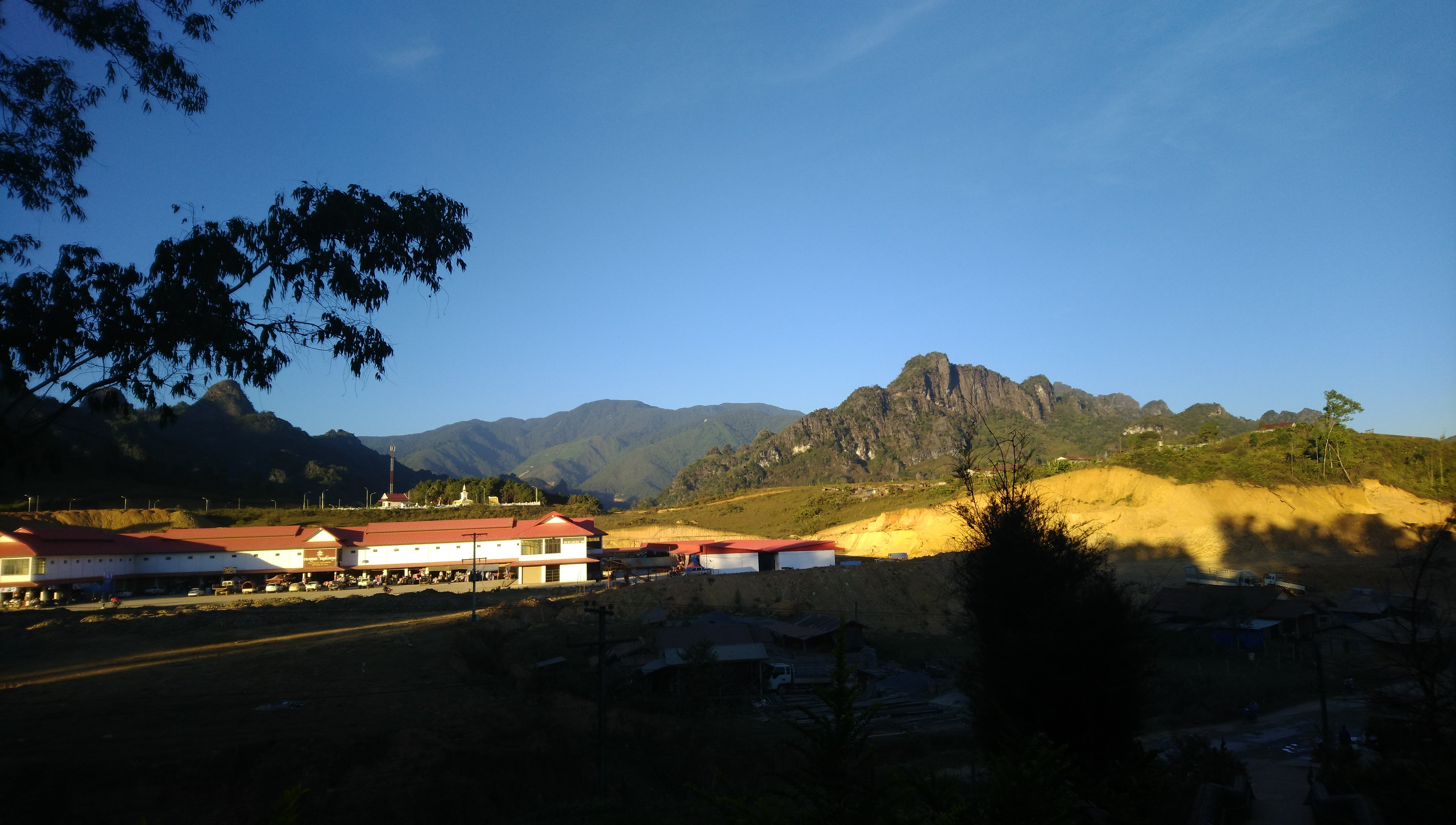
Phou Bia mountain from Xaysomboun town

To the northeast of the town of Xaisomboun in neighbouring Xiangkhouang province is Phou Bia Mountain—at 2,819 m (9,249 ft) the highest point in Laos. The principal river, the Nam Ngum, has been subject to a hydroelectric scheme with the creation of a dam and reservoir and an underground power plant. In March 2014 it was announced that the Chinese company Norinco International Cooperation, Ltd. had invested US$218 million in the development, projected to take 42 months.

Phou Khao Khouay National Biodiversity Conservation Area is a protected area 40 kilometres (25 mi) northeast of Vientiane. It was established on 29 October 1993 covering an area of 2,000 km^{2} (770 sq mi) extending into neighboring provinces. It has a stretch of mountain range with sandstone cliffs, river gorges and three rivers with tributaries which flow into the Mekong River.

=== Administrative divisions ===
There are 96 villages. Districts are:

Map	Code	Name	Lao script
	18-01	Anouvong District	ເມືອງອະນຸວົງ
	18-02	Longchaeng District	ເມືອງລ້ອງແຈ້ງ
	18-03	Longxan District	ເມືອງລ້ອງຊານ
	18-04	Hom District	ເມືອງຮົ່ມ
	18-05	Thathom District	ເມືອງທ່າໂທມ

== History ==
Xaisomboun is the 18th province of Laos. It was designated special administrative zone between June 1994 and 2006, with the military controlling the area to suppress Hmong resistance and to exploit timber resources. Some Hmong locals fled Laos during this period, taking refuge in Phetchabun, Thailand.

Xaisomboun was established as a province on 13 December 2013. Since then, dam construction on the Nam Ngum River led to around 300 families being relocated to Feuang District in Vientiane province. They were not compensated for the loss of their land.

The province has witnessed conflict between the government and the Hmong peoples. In November 2015, unrest broke out in the province, killing three soldiers and three civilians. The Lao government imposed a curfew in the north-central part of the province in December, and in January 2016 a bomb was set off at a road construction site near Pha Nok Nok village in Long Cheang District, killing two Chinese officials and injuring another. As a result, on 16 February 2016, Major General Thongloy Silivong, a military officer who is the former chief of the National Defense Academy, was appointed the governor of Xaisomboun to tighten control. On 16 June 2017, another Chinese official was shot dead in the province.

Since 2019, the government has been exploring options to develop the tourism industry in the province, resulting in further displacement of the Hmong population, especially near Phou Bia.

== Economy ==
The economic centre of the province lies in Xaisomboun town, Anouvong District. There are copper and gold mining operations at Sana Somboun, with companies such as Phu Bia Mining Limited operating. Phu Kam and Ban Houayxai Gold-Silver are some mines in the area, with the Phu Kham mine producing 83,680 tonnes of copper concentrate and 70,787 ounces of gold and Ban Houayxai Gold-Silver producing 108,570 oz of gold and 666,628 oz of silver in 2018. The Phu Bia Mining Company began operations in 2006 and as of June 2019 had given nearly 6,248 trillion kip (US$716 million) in cumulative contributions to the government, generating over 3200 jobs for mainly Hmong locals. Phu Bia has permission to mine until at least 2021.

The locals are mainly involved in cultivation, fish-raising, poultry and livestock.

In 2021, Xaisomboun provincial officials announced the development of Phou Bia Mountain as a "sustainable development tourism site", valued at some US$500 million. The development will center on Phou Houa Xang Village, in Anouvong District, Xaisomboun, under a 99 year concession.
