= Long Tieng =

Site information
- Controlled by: Lao People's Army

Location
- Coordinates: 19°6′28″N 102°55′24.5″E

Site history
- Built: 1962
- In use: 1962-present
- Battles/wars: Vietnam War

Garrison information
- Occupants: U.S. Air Force/Central Intelligence Agency; Royal Lao Army

Long Tieng
- IATA: none; ICAO: none

Summary
- Elevation AMSL: 3,215 ft (980 m)
- Interactive map of Long Tieng

Runways
Direction	Length		Surface
Direction	ft	m	Surface
	5,000	1,524

Long Tieng (also spelled Long Chieng, Long Cheng, or Long Chen) is a town in Longchaeng district, Xaisomboun Province. During the Lao Civil War, it served as a military base for the Hmong Army, the airbase was operated by the Central Intelligence Agency of the United States. During this time, it was also referred to as Lima Site 98 (LS 98) or Lima Site 20A (LS 20A).

At the height of its significance in the late 1960s, the "secret city" of Long Tieng maintained a population of 40,000 inhabitants, making it the second largest city in Laos at the time, although it never appeared on maps throughout this period.

== History ==
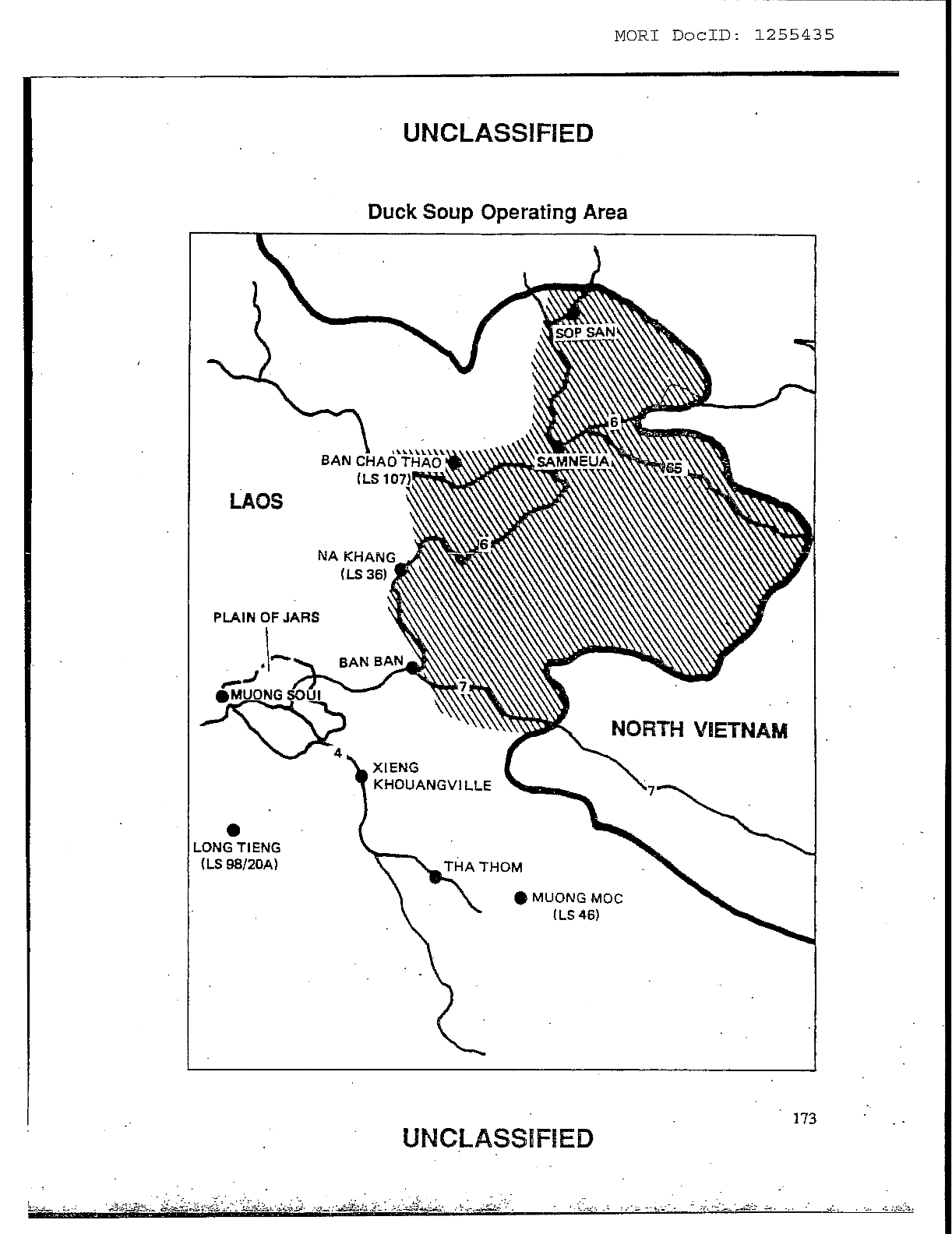
Long Tieng (lower left) marked on a 1965 map

In 1962 the CIA first set up a headquarters for Major General Vang Pao in the Long Tieng valley, which at that time had almost no inhabitants. By 1964 a 1260 m runway had been completed and by 1966 Long Cheng was one of the largest US installations on foreign soil.

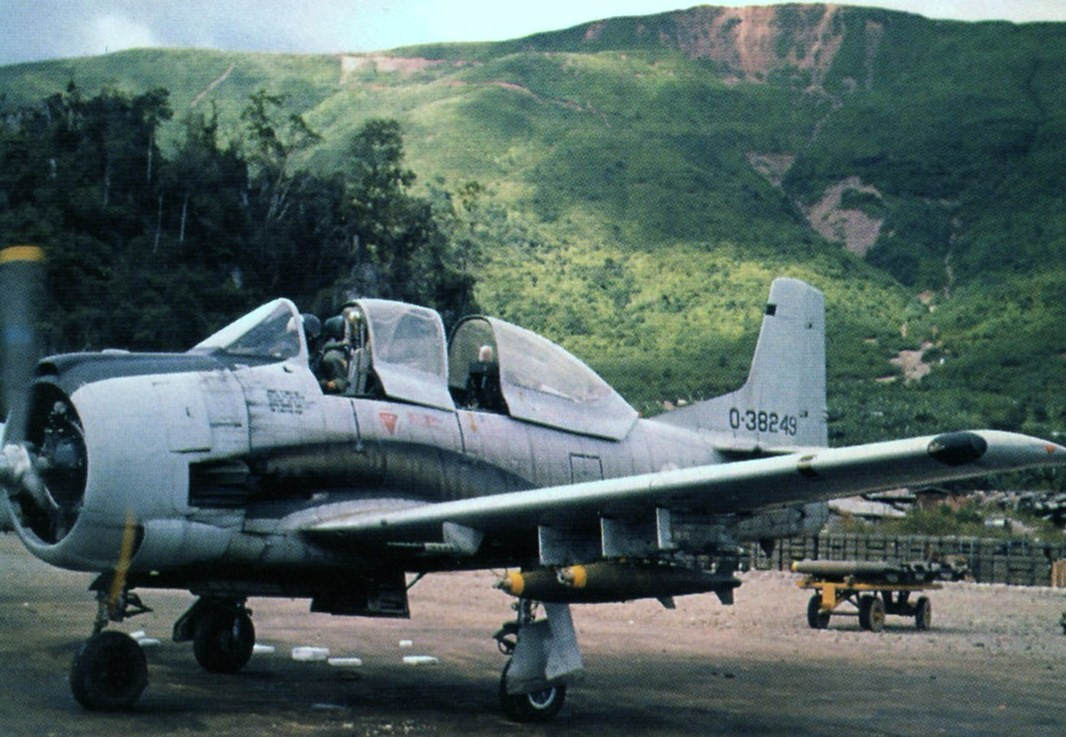
A RLAF T-28D at Long Tieng. On November 10, 1972 it ran into a C-123K on the runway.

North Vietnamese forces began to threaten Long Tieng in late 1971, and came close enough to start shelling the area on December 31 at 15:30 local time. In early January, 19,000 North Vietnamese forces launched a four pronged attack on Long Tieng from all four cardinal directions, encircling the site, capturing several facilities and positions, and installing antiaircraft batteries. Despite subsequent claims of victory from communist forces, the 10,000 defenders of Long Tieng, a mixture of Hmong, Thai, and Lao, had not been overrun, and in mid-month reinforcements appeared in the form of CIA-led Thais and 1200 elite irregulars from southern Laos. After enduring a third to 50% casualties, these forces succeeded in taking back key positions by the end of the month.

== Description ==
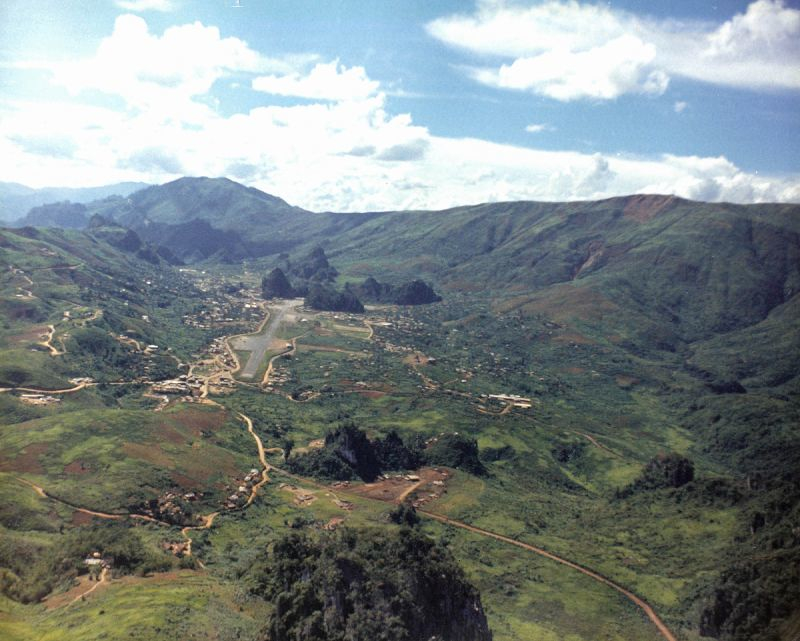
Long Tieng, 1973

Long Tieng was often described as "the most secret place on Earth". It was in a valley at 3,100 feet elevation, high enough to have chilly nights and cold fogs. It was surrounded by mountains and on the northwest side of the runway were karst outcrops several hundred feet high. In the shadow of the karst outcrops was "Sky" the CIA headquarters in Long Tieng. Jerry Daniels, a CIA officer codenamed "Hog," is said to have named Sky after his home state of Montana, known as "Big Sky Country". Long Tieng was protected on three sides by limestone mountains.

"What a place is Long Tieng," said USAID officer Jim Schill. "Tribal soldiers dressed in military garb standing next to traditionally dressed Hmong, with Thai mercenaries milling about. And the Americans here are mostly CIA operatives with goofy code names like Hog, Mr. Clean, and Junkyard. The town itself is not much. There's one paved road running through it and tin shacks on either side with eating shops, food stalls, and living quarters."

During the Secret War, Long Tieng became the largest Hmong settlement in the world. In the words of one author, Long Tieng "became a desultory metropolis, an unpaved, sewerless city of 30,000 where Hmong ran noodle stands, cobbled shoes, tailored clothes, repaired radios, ran military-jeep taxi services, and interpreted for American pilots and relief workers."

== Evacuation ==
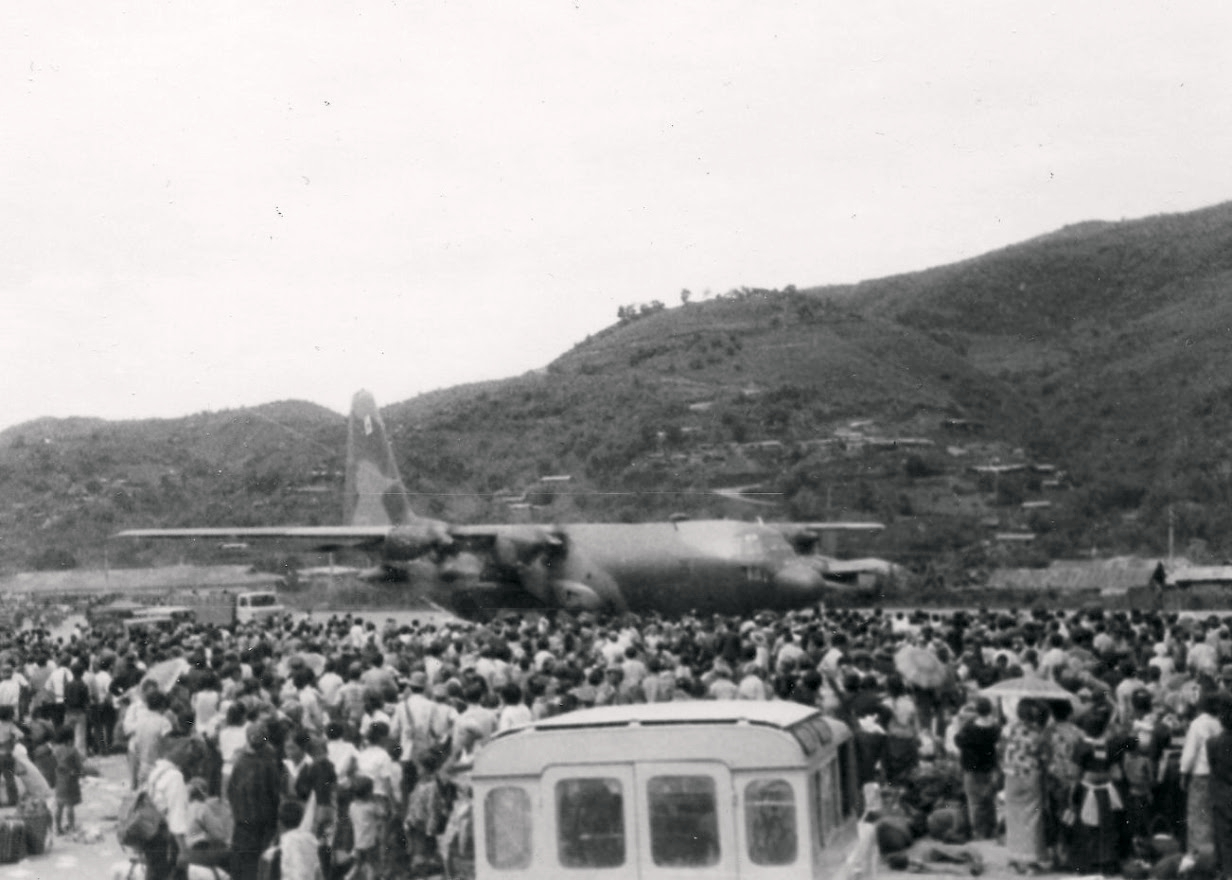
A C-130 Hercules at Long Tieng, May 1975.

On February 22, 1975, the final defensive outpost for Long Tieng was defeated, leading US Brigadier General Heinie Aderholt to begin planning an evacuation. By May 1975, there were almost 50,000 guerillas and refugees living in and around the city. However, by then, the U.S. had withdrawn all its civilian and military personnel from Indochina, except for a few embassy personnel in Laos and CIA officer Jerry Daniels in Long Tieng. There were few resources for an evacuation. Daniels had only a single transport aircraft and Hmong pilot in Long Tieng to take evacuees to Udon Thani, Thailand. Aderholt located three additional American transport aircraft and pilots in Thailand. He had the planes "sheep dipped" to remove all markings identifying them as American-owned and sent them to Long Tieng. On May 10, 1975, Vang Pao reluctantly followed the CIA's counsel and decided that he could no longer maintain Long Tieng against the opposing forces. Between May 10 to May 14, 1975, US C-130s and C-46s airlifted people from the airbase to US bases in Thailand. Between 1,000 and 3,000 Hmong were evacuated. Crowds of civilians surrounded the flights on the runways, creating a chaotic atmosphere. Those evacuated were primarily Hmong military leaders and CIA employees.

The evacuation ended with the departure of Major General Vang Pao and Jerry Daniels. Vang Pao told the people still on the tarmac "Farewell, my brothers, I can do nothing more for you, I would only be a torment for you," as he boarded a helicopter. Tens of thousands of fighters and refugees were left behind. The 10,000 or more Hmong clustered around the airfield expected more aircraft to return, but they soon realized that none would come. The shelling of Long Tieng began on the afternoon of May 14. Many of the Hmong fighters and their families made their way overland to Thailand during the next several years, a dangerous journey that cost many of them their lives.

The American pilots, all civilians, participating in the evacuation were Les Strouse, Allen Rich, Matt Hoff, Jack Knotts, and Dave Kouba.

== Accidents and incidents ==
- On 23 July 1970, a Douglas C-47B XW-TDC of Xiengkhouang Air was damaged beyond repair in a landing accident during inclement weather.
- In 1971 a US Air Force F-4D Phantom mistakenly hit Long Tieng with cluster bombs, causing a fire that destroyed the CIA operations shack.

== After 1975 ==
Long Tieng was incorporated into the restricted Xaisomboun Special Zone in 1994. This zone was dissolved on 13 January 2006 and Xaisomboun Province was created in 2013. The base is still maintained by the Laotian military.

The area's history was documented in the 2008 film The Most Secret Place on Earth.

== Namesake ==
A charter school in Saint Paul, Minnesota, home to many Hmong refugees, was named Long Tieng Academy, but it closed in 2012.

== See also ==
- CIA activities in Laos
- Lao People's Army
- Laotian Civil War
- Raven FACs
- Ban Phou Pheung Noi
