= Royal Thai Army Special Warfare Command =

Special operations force of the Royal Thai Army

- หน่วยบัญชาการสงครามพิเศษ
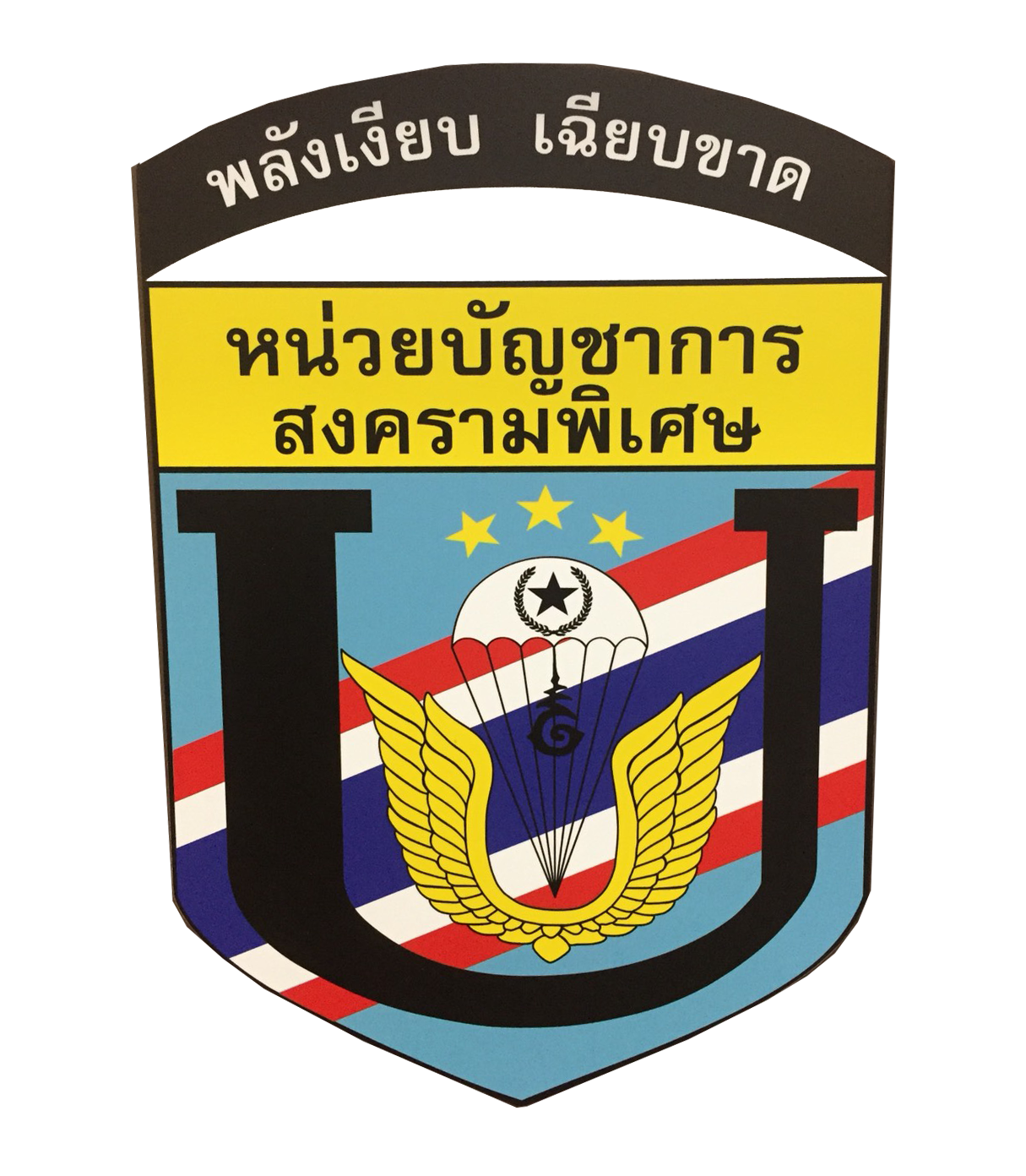
- Unit insignia
- Active: Royal Thai Army Special Warfare Command (1983–present); Royal Thai Army Special Forces (1966–1983); June 4th 1954–present
- Country: Thailand
- Allegiance: HM The King of Thailand
- Branch: Royal Thai Army
- Type: Special forces
- Size: Division
- Garrison/HQ: Thale Chup Son, Mueang Lopburi, Lopburi, Thailand
- Nickname: พลร่มป่าหวาย(Pa Wai Airborne)
- Motto: พลังเงียบ เฉียบขาด ( Silent And Decisive Forces )
- Engagements: Cold War; Malayan Emergency; Vietnam War; Laotian Civil War; Cambodian Civil War; Communist insurgency in Thailand; Communist insurgency in Malaysia; Third Indochina War; Cambodian–Vietnamese War; Vietnamese border raids in Thailand; Thai–Laotian Border War; Persian Gulf War; 1999 East Timorese crisis; International Force East Timor; War on drugs; Internal conflict in Myanmar; Operation Border Post 9631; 2010–2012 Myanmar border clashes; Global war on terrorism; Operation Enduring Freedom; Iraq War; OEF - Afghanistan; OEF - Horn of Africa; 2003 Phnom Penh riots; Operation Pochentong; Southern Insurgency; Cambodian–Thai border dispute; Notable operations: Battle of Vientiane; Operation Hardnose; Operation Star; Battle of Lima Site 85; Campaign Toan Thang; Campaign 139; Operation Counterpunch; Campaign 74B; Operation Sayasila; Operation Sourisak Montry VIII; Operation Strength (1972)
- Website: swcom.rta.mi.th/index.php

Commanders
- Notable commanders: General Sunthorn Kongsompong; General Surayud Chulanont; General Sonthi Boonyaratglin; General Chalermchai Sitthisart

The Royal Thai Army Special Warfare Command (Thai: หน่วยบัญชาการสงครามพิเศษ) also known as Pa Wai Airborne (Thai: พลร่มป่าหวาย) is the special forces of the Royal Thai Army. Its headquarters are King Narai Camp in Lopburi.

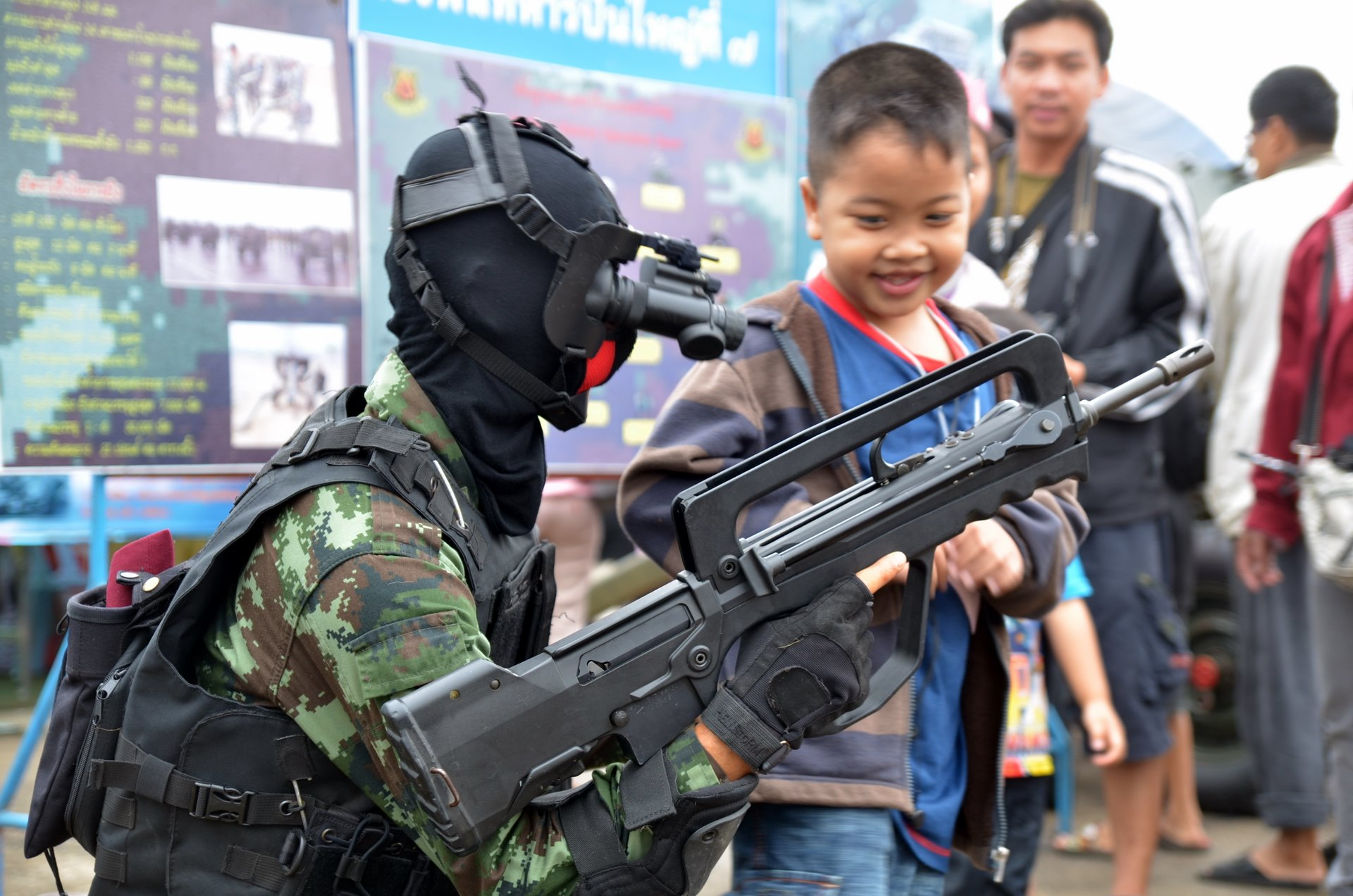
Thai Army Special Force member in Children's Day 2012 at the Chiang Mai Air Force base

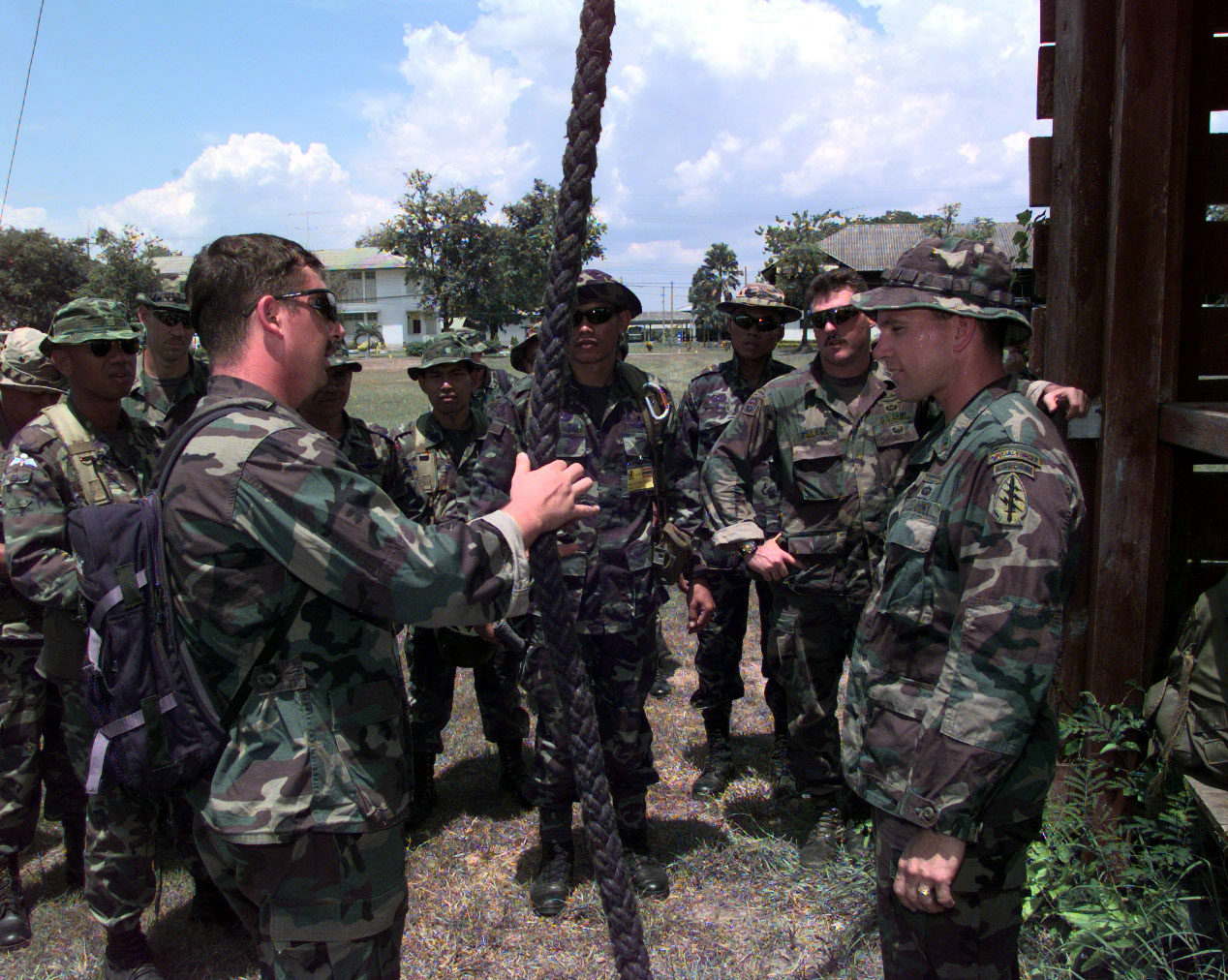
2 1st Special Forces group operators of the US Army Special Forces instructing Thai soldiers in 1998

== History ==
The Royal Thai Army recognizes the importance and necessity of warfare that can confront and reduce the threat from outside the country. It set up a special forces unit on June 4, 1954, at Ban Pa Wai Patan, Lopburi. Royal Thai Army special forces settled was first known as Parachute Infantry Battalion, with Lieutenant Colonel Tianchai Sirisumpan as the battalion commander.

The Parachute Infantry Battalion acted according to the plans set out by the Royal Thai Army and Internal Security Operations Command during its first mission, and its performance was deemed acceptable to supervisors at all levels. As a result, the paratroopers battalion was expanded initially with the goal of protecting the country from the threats posed by communism.

In 1953 the first US Army advisors arrived in Thailand to help the Royal Thai Army set up an airborne formation. In that year Camp Erawan was established at Lopburi for the fledgling parachute unit. The site had been previously occupied by the PARU, which had since moved down to Hua Hin. In the same year Capt. Tienchai Sirisumpan, a company commander in the 1st Infantry Regiment, was sent as one of the first foreign students to US Army Ranger training at Fort Benning, Georgia. Tienchai returned to Thailand the following year and was given command in 1955 of the newly designated Airborne Ranger Unit.

In 1956 the Rangers were used together with the BPP on operations along the southern border with British Malaya. During the following year, the Unit secured the capital as Police Gen. Phao was overthrown by Army commander Field Marshal Sarit. By that time, the Rangers had expanded into an Airborne Ranger Battalion numbering 580 men divided into 26 detachments. Over the next few years the paratroopers conducted field operations throughout the northern provinces, identifying loyal village leaders in the event of a Communist insurgency similar to the ones growing elsewhere in South-East Asia.

The deteriorating situation in Laos soon commanded the attention of the Rangers. In July 1959 interpreters from the Rangers were sent to Vientiane to begin assisting the Laotian army. These forces were temporarily assigned to Headquarters 333, Thailand's command unit for missions in Laos. Meanwhile, the Laotian 2e Bataillon Parachutiste was sent in November to Lopburi for refresher training. The Laotian 1st Bataillon Parachutiste arrived at Lopburi in mid-1960, but was rushed back after the 2 BP rebelled and took over the capital. In 1961 radio operators and other specialists were sent from the Ranger Battalion to assist the Lao army. In 1963 the Airborne Ranger Battalion was expanded and renamed the Special Forces Group (Airborne). Composed of six companies, the new Group was tasked with unconventional warfare behind enemy lines, psychological warfare operations, counter-insurgency missions, and the raising of village defence units.

The Royal Thai Special Forces (RTSF)' resumed the training of Lao military units in 1965 when parachute and infantry battalions arrived for refresher training at Camp Erawan, Lopburi. In the same year the first two RTSF training teams were sent to northern Laos to train local forces. One Thai sergeant was captured from these teams in May, and was not to be released until 1974. RTSF recon teams also started operating along the Ho Chi Minh Trail.

=== RTSF 1966 to 1975 ===
In 1966, United States Army Special Forces units arrived in Lopburi and began working extensively with the RTSF. By that time an RTSF Special Warfare Center had been established at Camp Narai, Lopburi, with 1 and 2 SF Groups (Airborne). The Special Warfare Commander was Col. Tienchai; SF Groups were commanded by colonels. In addition, 1 Airborne Battalion, commanded by a lieutenant-colonel, and the Quartermaster Aerial Resupply Company came under SWC command at Camp Erawan. The Airborne Battalion's mission was to provide airborne infantry reinforcements for the Army's conventional units.

The RTSF's Laotian missions continued through the late 1960s, with liaison and mobile training teams assigned across Laos. One team was with the Nam Bac garrison when it fell in January 1968. all personnel were rescued after evading enemy patrols for a week. The RTSF also assigned men to 1 Long Range Reconnaissance Troop of the Royal Thai Army Expeditionary Division, Vietnam, from 1969- 1971. By 1971 the widening war in South-East Asia provided the RTSF with more training missions. The RTSF already ran the Special Warfare School at Lopburi, which included airborne training facilities and a ranger course modelled after the US Army Ranger School. By this time the RTSF training facilities were considered among the best in Asia. The RTSF stayed involved in Laos, training Lao personnel at Lopburi until 1973 and occasionally sending teams on reconnaissance operations inside Laos. Othcr RTSF personnel manned the Special Battalion at Phitsanulok, which trained foreign students and conducted cross-border operations. The RTSF also provided men for thc Palace Guard in Bangkok. In addition, RTSF Mobile Training Teams spanned Thailand, conducting civic-action projects and training local anti-Communist militia.

In 1972 the SWC had expanded further with the creation of 3 SF Group (Airborne). Also in the SWC were 1 and 2 SF Groups, the Special Warfare School, 1 Airborne Battalion, the Quartermaster Aerial Resupply Company, the Psychological Operations Battalion, and thc Long Range Reconnaissance Company. The Special Warfare Commander was Maj.Gen. Tienchai. In the final years of the Vietnam War, Thailand was confronted with hostile Communist movements in both Laos and the Khmer Republic. RTSF teams were used on recon operations in Khmer Rouge-held territory along the northern half of the Khmer border. No RTSF personnel were lost on these missions.

=== RTSF post-Vietnam War ===
By 1977 4 SF Group (Airborne) had been raised to strength at Phitsanulok after the Special Battalion was fully absorbed by the RTSF. In the same year 1 Airborne Battalion was taken from the SWC and put under the command of 31st Infantry Regiment, 1st Division (King's Guard). In the late 1970s the RTSF was involved with training local village militia units during the height of the Communist Party of Thailand (CPT) insurgency. RTSF teams also conducted cross-border operations into Cambodia to gain intelligence on CPT training camps set up by thc sympathetic Khmer Rouge regime.

The RTSF stayed active as a training unit in the early 1980s. Besides helping raise Thai paramilitary militia, the RTSF also provided assistance to the anti-Communist Cambodian resistance as early as 1979, with expanded programmes for the Khmer People's National Liberation Front and the National Sihanoukist Army since 1982. Among other recent missions of the RTSF have been operations along the Cambodian border (prior to October 1987 co-ordinated through Army Operations Center 315), missions along the Laotian border (previously under AOC 309), and strikes against Burmese opium warlords. In the mid- 1980s the RTSF trained members of Task Force 838, an-elite unit that oversees the activities of the Cambodian resistance along the Thai Cambodian border.

In July 1982 the four Special Forces Groups under the SWC were renamed 1, 2, 3, and 4 Special Forces Regiments of I Special Forc'es Division (Airborne). At the same time the entire 31st Infantry Regiment, 1st Division (King's Guard), which controlled I Airborne Battalion co-located at Camp Erawan, was redesignated 31st Infantry Regiment 1st Division. The regiment is currently headquartered at Lopburi, with one airborne battalion rotated through Camp Erawan.

In 1984 the Special Warfare Command was established at Lopburi to co-ordinate all Thai Army elite units. With external threats to Thailand's security from Cambodia, Laos, Vietnam and Burma, the Command is given responsibility for waging war outside the borders of the country. The Special Warfare Command is also known as 5 Army Region, marking it as a lieutenant-general's command equal to the four geographical Army Regions.

While not prone to involvement in Thai domestic politics, the RTSF dispatched I I helicopter-loads of paratroopers to Bangkok during a September 1985 coup attempt. Their intervention was largely symbolic, however, since the government was already well in control by the time they arrived. In May Ig86 the RTSF was again poised for intervention in Bangkok when Army commander-in-chief Arthit appeared ready to launch a coup. Although minor counter-terrorist missions were assumed by units of the paramilitary Rangers (not to be confused with ranger graduates of the RTSF Special Warfare School) in August 1984, the RTSF is responsible for responding to major terrorist incidents and hostage-rescue situations. In 1989 RTSF counter-terrorist missions were handled by Task Force go, based in Lopburi.

The RTSF maintains links with SF units around the world. Several joint training exercises are conducted annually with the US Army Special Forces. Exchange training programmes are held with the Australian SASR and the South Korean Special Forces, among others. In addition to training their own personnel, the RTSF provides instructors for Royal Thai Army Ranger courses located at the SWC, the Infantry Training Center, and the Cavalry Training Center. All RTSF members must be graduates of the nine-week course. With over three decades of combat experience, the RTSF today stands as one of the most capable elite forces in Asia.

In 1989 the RTSF fielded two full divisions. The Special Warfare Command and the SWC remain at Lopburi. I SF Division is headquartered at Camp Erawan, with one of its regiments at each of Lopburi's three military camps: 1 SF Regt. at Camp Pawai, 2 SF Regt. at Camp Narai, and 3 SF Regt. at Camp Erawan. 2 SF Division moved its permanent headquarters to Chieng Mai in early 1988, having been temporarily quarteredat Lopburi over the previous year. The division has two regiments: 4 SF Regt., formerly the Special Battalion, at Phitsanulok, and 5 SF Regt. at Chieng Mai. The Long Range Reconnaissance Company, Ajrborne Resupply Battalion and Psychological Operations Battalion, which seconded personnel in 1988 to the Displaced Persons Protection Unit along the Thai-Cambodian border, are also at Camp Erawan.

== Organization ==
=== Royal Thai Army Special Warfare Command Headquarters ===
- Special Warfare Center
  - Special Warfare School
    - Basic Training Course
    - Ranger Training Center
    - Airborne Training Center
    - Special Force Training Center
    - Psychological Operations Training Course
- 1st Special Forces Division
  - 1st Special Forces Regiment (Airborne)
    - 1st Special Forces Battalion (Airborne)
    - 2nd Special Forces Battalion (Airborne)
  - 2nd Special Forces Regiment (Airborne)
    - 1st Special Forces Battalion (Airborne)
    - 2nd Special Forces Battalion (Airborne)
  - 3rd Special Forces Regiment, King's Guard (Airborne)
    - Special Operation Battalion, King's Guard
    - Ranger Battalion, King's Guard
      - 1st Ranger Company, Ranger Battalion, King's Guard
      - 2nd Ranger Company, Ranger Battalion, King's Guard
      - 3rd Ranger Company, Ranger Battalion, King's Guard
  - 4th Special Forces Regiment (Airborne)
    - 1st Special Forces Battalion (Airborne)
    - 2nd Special Forces Battalion (Airborne)
  - 5th Special Forces Regiment (Airborne)
    - 1st Special Forces Battalion (Airborne)
    - 2nd Special Forces Battalion (Airborne)
  - Long Range Reconnaissance Patrols Company (LRRP)
  - Psychological Operations Battalion
  - Quartermaster Aerial Supply Company
  - 35th Signal Corp Battalion
    - 1st Signal Corp Company
    - 2nd Signal Corp Company
    - 3rd Signal Corp Company

== See also ==
- Royal Thai Special Force
- Thai Force Reconnaissance Marine
- Royal Thai Air Force Security Force Regiment
- Royal Thai Air Force Special Operations Regiment
- Royal Thai Marine Corps
- Royal Thai Army
- Royal Thai Navy
- Royal Thai Air Force
