= Operation Star (Laos) =

- Part of Laotian Civil War; Vietnam War supported by Operation Pony Express and Operation Hardnose
- Type: Military intelligence program
- Location: Camp Siberia, Savannakhet Province, Laos
- Planned: Royal Thai Government
- Objective: Gather military intelligence; train irregulars
- Date: Late 1965–early 1967
- Executed by: Royal Thai Special Forces, CIA, RTMC, BPP
- Outcome: Active until early 1967 when subsumed by Operation Hardnose

Operation Star was a highly classified military intelligence gathering program set up in late 1965 by the Royal Thai Government during the Vietnam War. It was co-located with the American Central Intelligence Agency's Operation Hardnose at Camp Siberia 26 kilometers northeast of Savannakhet, Laos. The operation was founded although American intelligence sources in the area already shared their results with the Thais. Royal Thai Special Forces assigned as instructors to Operation Hardnose were utilized as reconnaissance teams. In early 1967, the CIA eventually severed the Thai intelligence operation from the instructional duties for Lao irregular military troops.

== Background ==
American awareness of the importance of the Ho Chi Minh Trail took root early. It was soon concluded that if this sole land supply route through the Annamese Cordillera were cut or blocked, the communist insurgency in South Vietnam would wither for lack of supplies. Because of this, the Trail was subjected to constant air and ground surveillance by American, Lao, and Thai intelligence operations.

== Operations ==
Operating in deep security, Operation Star's four six-man road watch teams generally infiltrated toward the Mu Gia Pass on the border between Laos and the Democratic Republic of Vietnam. In one case, Team Red Bull was infiltrated overseeing Route 912 of the Ho Chi Minh Trail, only to be ambushed and dispersed. The survivors took up to a month to emerge from the Annamese Cordillera.

In February 1966, Operation Star got to share in the newly assigned helicopter assets of Operation Pony Express for infiltration and exfiltration of intelligence teams. As 1966 progressed, Operation Star swelled to ten teams. In conjunction with the operation, the CIA tried using Thai espionage agents, in an attempt to hurdle the language barrier between Americans and Lao hill tribesmen. English-speaking Thais from the Royal Thai Marine Corps, Border Patrol Police, and RTSF were trained for 30 days at the old Wapi Project camp 36 kilometers northwest of Pakse. Inserted near the Ho Chi Minh Trail at the end of 1966, they were exfiltrated without moving onto the Trail. This failure saw them discharged by March 1967. It also led impetus to the efforts that developed the Hark-1 radio for Project Hardnose.

Arrival of a CIA case agent to oversee the Camp Siberia operations in early 1967 led to changes. The five Thai instructors were severed from support of Operation Star, to devote their entire energies to training Operation Hardnose road watchers. A building program included two classrooms, obstacle course, dining hall, and a land navigation course. There was also a move to replace Thai instructors with Lao; to American surprise, the latter performed as well in the instructional role as Thais.
