= Task Force 90 (Thailand) =

Special operations force of the Royal Thai Army

Special Operations Battalion
- กองพันปฏิบัติการพิเศษ กรมรบพิเศษที่ 3
- Unit insignia
- Active: Special Operations Battalion (? – 2019, 2024 – present); Special Operations Battalion, King's Guard (2019 – 2024); Special Operations Division (2007 – ?); Special Operations Company (1986 – 2007); Special Operations Task Unit (1984 – 86); Assault Team 81 (1981 – 84)
- Country: Thailand
- Allegiance: Royal Thai Army Special Warfare Command
- Branch: Royal Thai Army
- Type: Special forces
- Size: Classified
- Part of: 3rd Special Forces Regiment; Counter Terrorist Operations Center Royal Thai Armed Forces Headquarters
- Garrison/HQ: Fort Airavata, Khao Sam Yot, Mueang Lopburi, Lopburi Province
- Nicknames: ฉ.ก.90 (Task Force 90) กองพันปีศาจ (The demon battalion); Unsung Heroes
- Mottos: กล้าหาญ, เด็ดเดี่ยว, รวดเร็ว ("Brave, Steady, Prompt")
- Anniversaries: 24 July
- Engagements: Cold War; Communist insurgency in Thailand; Communist insurgency in Malaysia; Vietnamese border raids in Thailand; Thai–Laotian Border War; War on drugs; Internal conflict in Myanmar; Operation Border Post 9631; Global war on terrorism; Southern Insurgency; 2010 Thai political protests; 2010 Thai military crackdown; Tham Luang cave rescue; Cambodia–Thailand border dispute; 2008–2013 Cambodian–Thai border crisis; 2025 Cambodian–Thai conflict

Commanders
- Notable commanders: Thanasak Patimaprakorn

The Special Operations Battalion, 3rd Special Forces Regiment (Thai: กองพันปฏิบัติการพิเศษ กรมรบพิเศษที่ 3) (พัน.ปพ. รพศ.3) also known as Task Force 90 (Thai: ฉ.ก.90) is a special forces unit of the Royal Thai Army (RTA). It is currently part of the 3rd Special Forces Regiment King's Guard (Airborne), Royal Thai Army Special Warfare Command (RTASWC).The Task Force 90 has been sometimes referred to as the Thai Delta Force

== History ==
The Task Force 90 (TF90) was founded by the 1st Division, King's Guard in 1981. In the early stages of creating the TF90, 1st and 2nd generation (42 men per generation) was trained by the British Special Air Service (SAS) and 3rd generation (40 men) was trained by Sayeret Matkal. After that, personnel from all three generations took the knowledge gained from the training to train and develop the next generation of personnel. Currently, TF90 regularly trains with special forces units of the Royal Thai Navy (RTN), Royal Thai Air Force (RTAF), and Royal Thai Police (RTP), as well as foreign special forces. Most of which are US Special Forces, the training will focus on crisis management responding to the terrorist event for tactical operations counterterrorism and hostage rescue. The unit was promoted to King's Guard in 2019.

== Recruitment, selection and training ==
To be eligible for the Task Force 90 unit selection process, candidates must first be members of the RTASWC and have successfully completed both the counterterrorism and hostage rescue courses. Applicants undergo rigorous physical and mental evaluations, and those who pass are admitted into an intensive training program. As with all special forces units, the training is exceptionally demanding and high-risk, with the potential for severe injuries or even fatalities. Only those who successfully complete this grueling program earn the right to join Task Force.

== Gallery ==
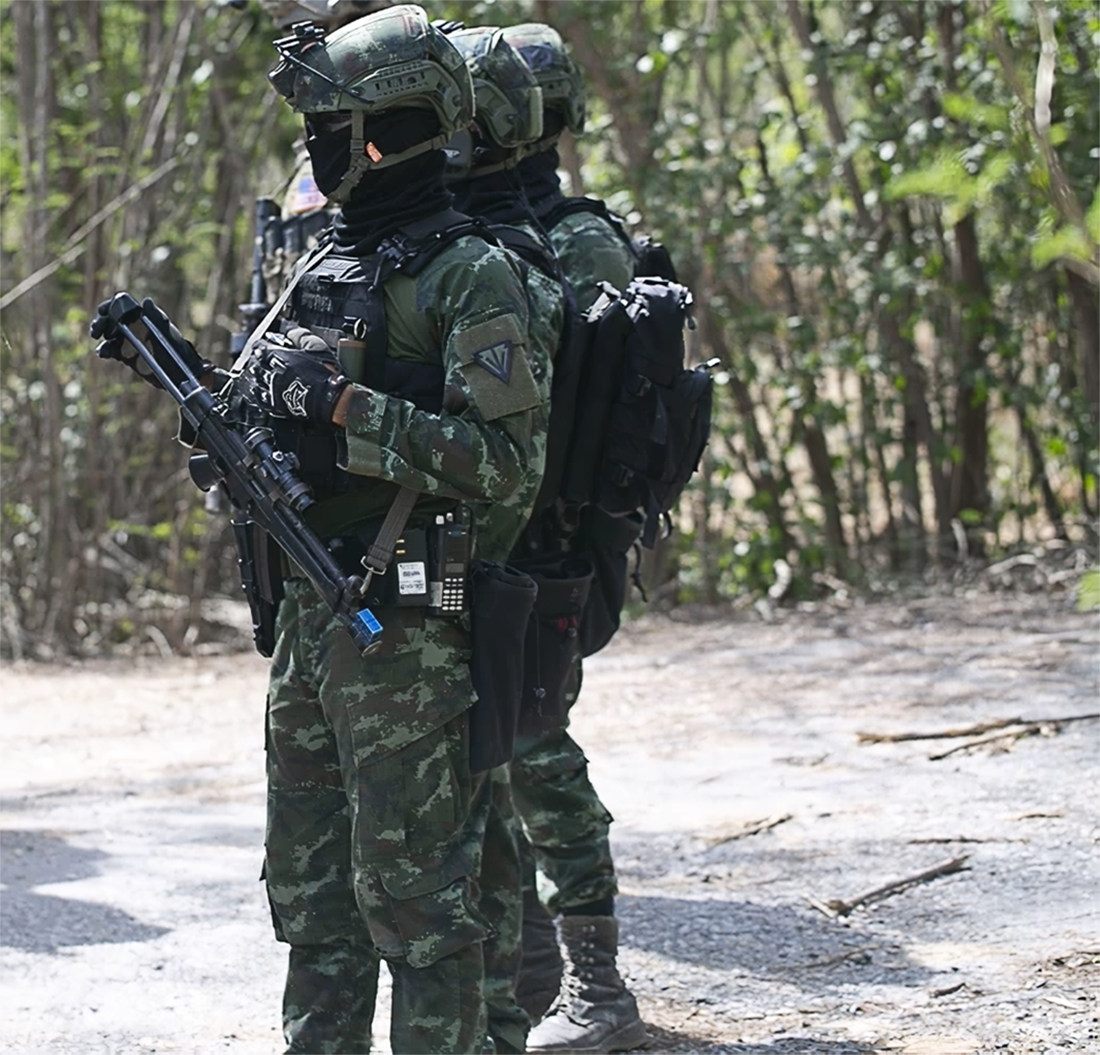
Task Force 90 soldier training with U.S. special forces in U-Tapao Thailand, 10 Sep 2019

== See also ==
- Royal Thai Special Force
- Royal Thai Army Special Force
- Royal Thai Army Ranger
- Royal Thai Navy SEALs
- Thai Force Reconnaissance Marine
- Royal Thai Air Force Security Force Regiment
- Royal Thai Air Force Special Operations Regiment
