= Special forces of Thailand =

== Royal Thai Army ==
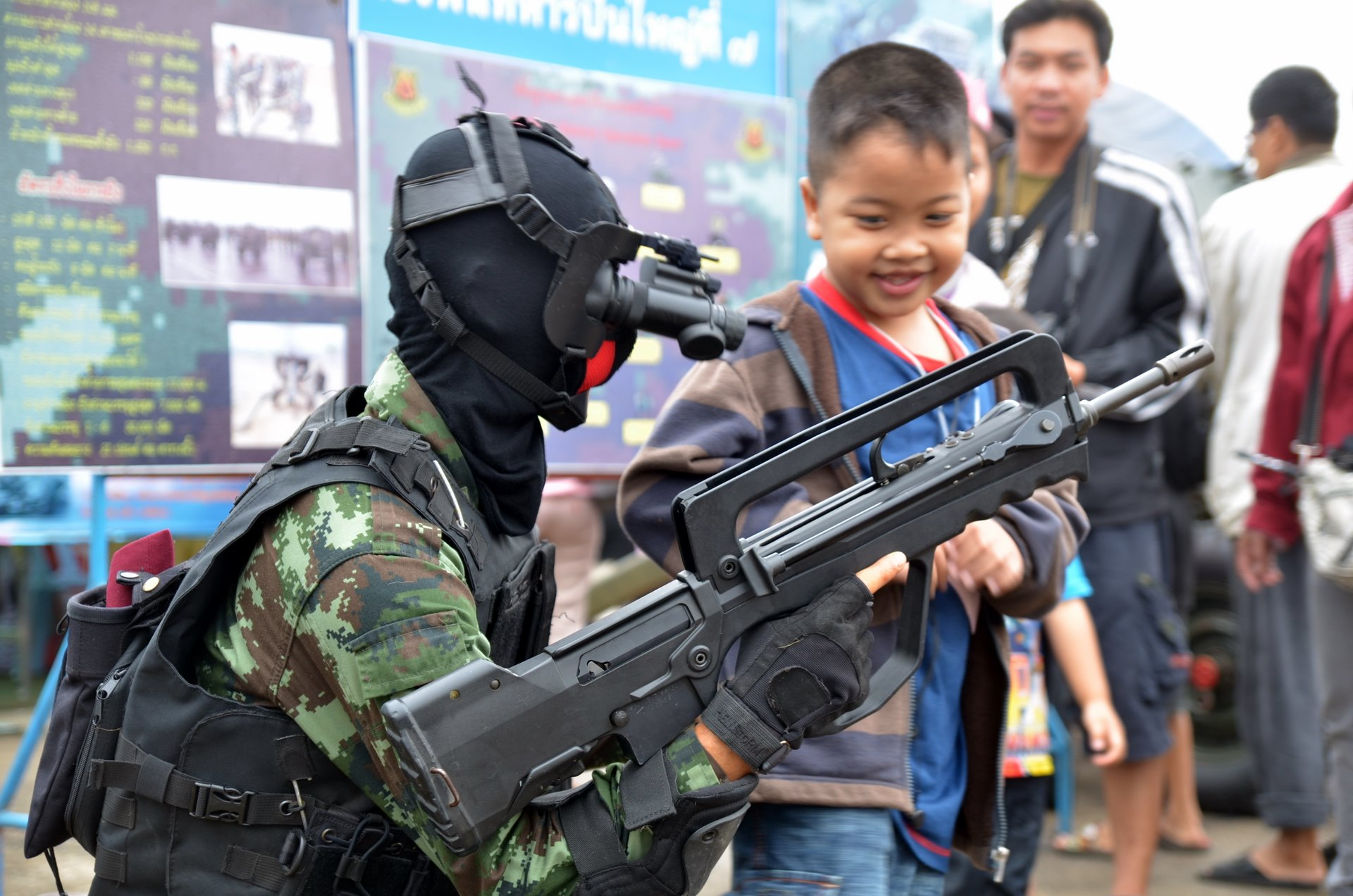
Thai Army Special Force member in Children's Day 2012 at the Chiang Mai Air Force base

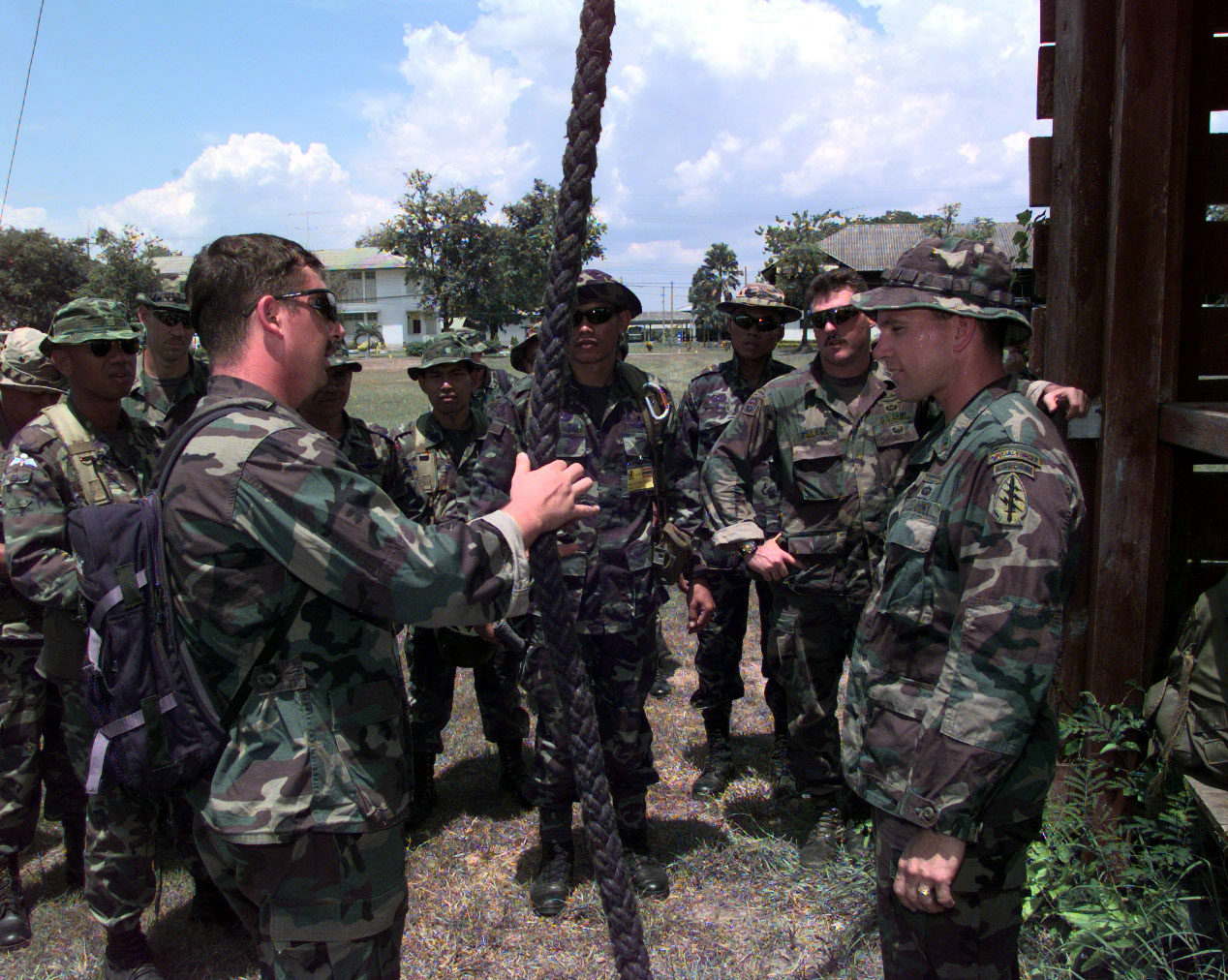
Two 1st Special Forces group operators instructing Thai soldiers in 1998

- Royal Thai Army Special Warfare Command also known as Royal Thai Army Special Forces
  - Special Warfare Center
    - Special Warfare School
      - Basic Training Course
      - Ranger Training Center
      - Airborne Training Center
      - Special Force Training Center
      - Psychological Operations Training Course
  - 1st Special Forces Division
    - 1st Special Forces Regiment (Airborne)
      - 1st Special Forces Battalion (Airborne)
      - 2nd Special Forces Battalion (Airborne)
    - 2nd Special Forces Regiment (Airborne)
      - 1st Special Forces Battalion (Airborne)
      - 2nd Special Forces Battalion (Airborne)
    - 3rd Special Forces Regiment (Airborne)
      - Special Operation Battalion also known as Task Force 90
      - Ranger Battalion also known as Royal Thai Army Ranger
        - 1st Ranger Company, Ranger Battalion
        - 2nd Ranger Company, Ranger Battalion
        - 3rd Ranger Company, Ranger Battalion
    - 4th Special Forces Regiment (Airborne)
      - 1st Special Forces Battalion (Airborne)
      - 2nd Special Forces Battalion (Airborne)
    - 5th Special Forces Regiment (Airborne)
      - 1st Special Forces Battalion (Airborne)
      - 2nd Special Forces Battalion (Airborne)
    - Long Range Reconnaissance Patrols Company also known as LRRP
    - Psychological Battalion
    - Quartermaster Aerial Supply Company
    - 35th Signal Corp Battalion
- 31st Infantry Regiment also known as Rapid Deployment Force
  - 1st Infantry Battalion, 31st Infantry Regiment, King Bhumibol's Guard
  - 2nd Infantry Battalion, 31st Infantry Regiment, King Bhumibol's Guard
  - 3rd Infantry Battalion, 31st Infantry Regiment, King Bhumibol's Guard

== Royal Thai Navy ==
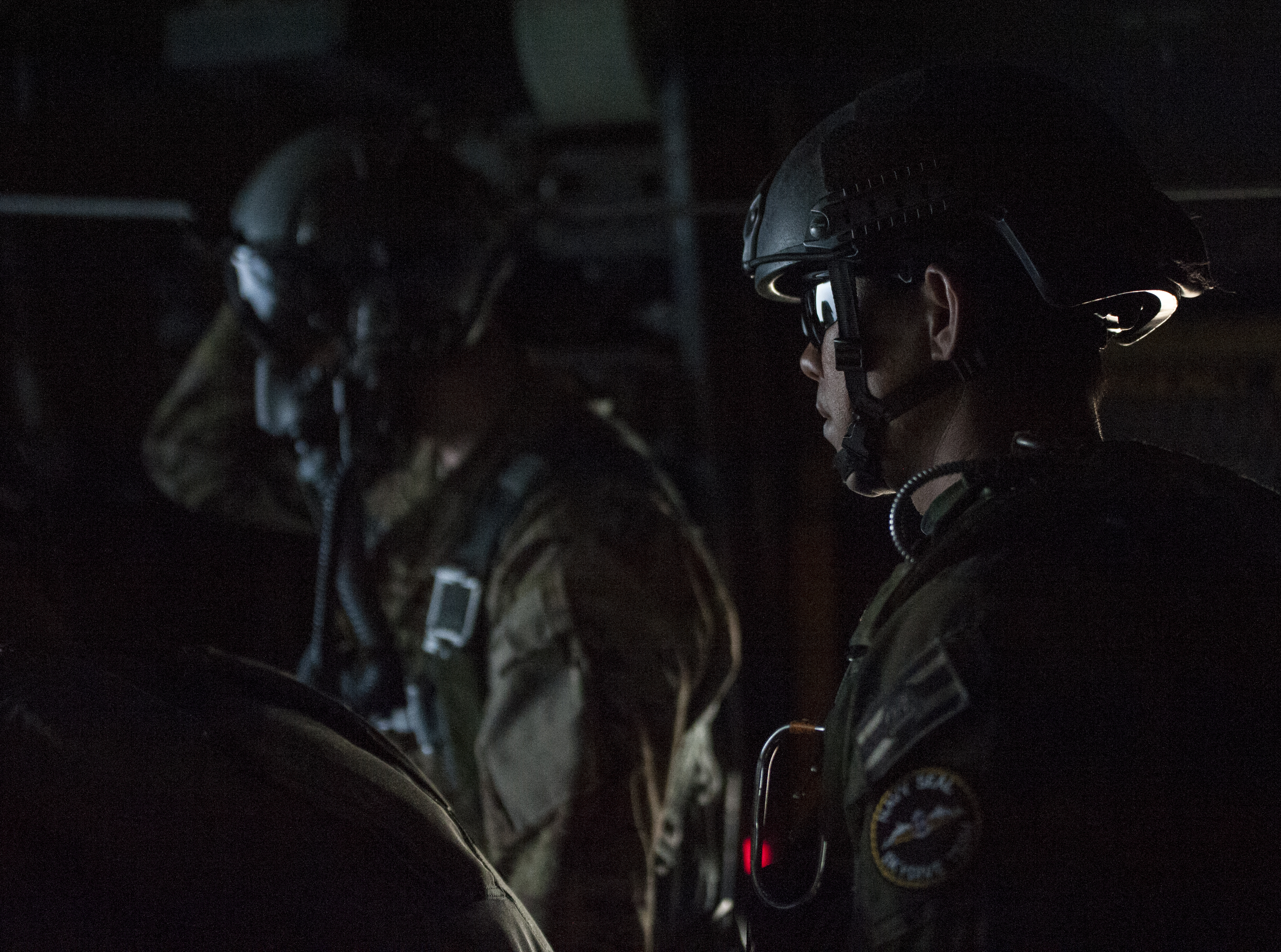
Royal Thai Naval Special Warfare operators prepare for military free fall operations from a U.S. Air Force 1st Special Operations Squadron MC-130H Combat Talon II Feb. 15, 2018, at U-Tapao, Thailand. Airborne infiltration training maintains bilateral capabilities and bolsters operational effectiveness of Thai and U.S. special operations forces.

Naval Special Warfare Command also known as Royal Thai Navy SEALs

== Royal Thai Marine Corps ==
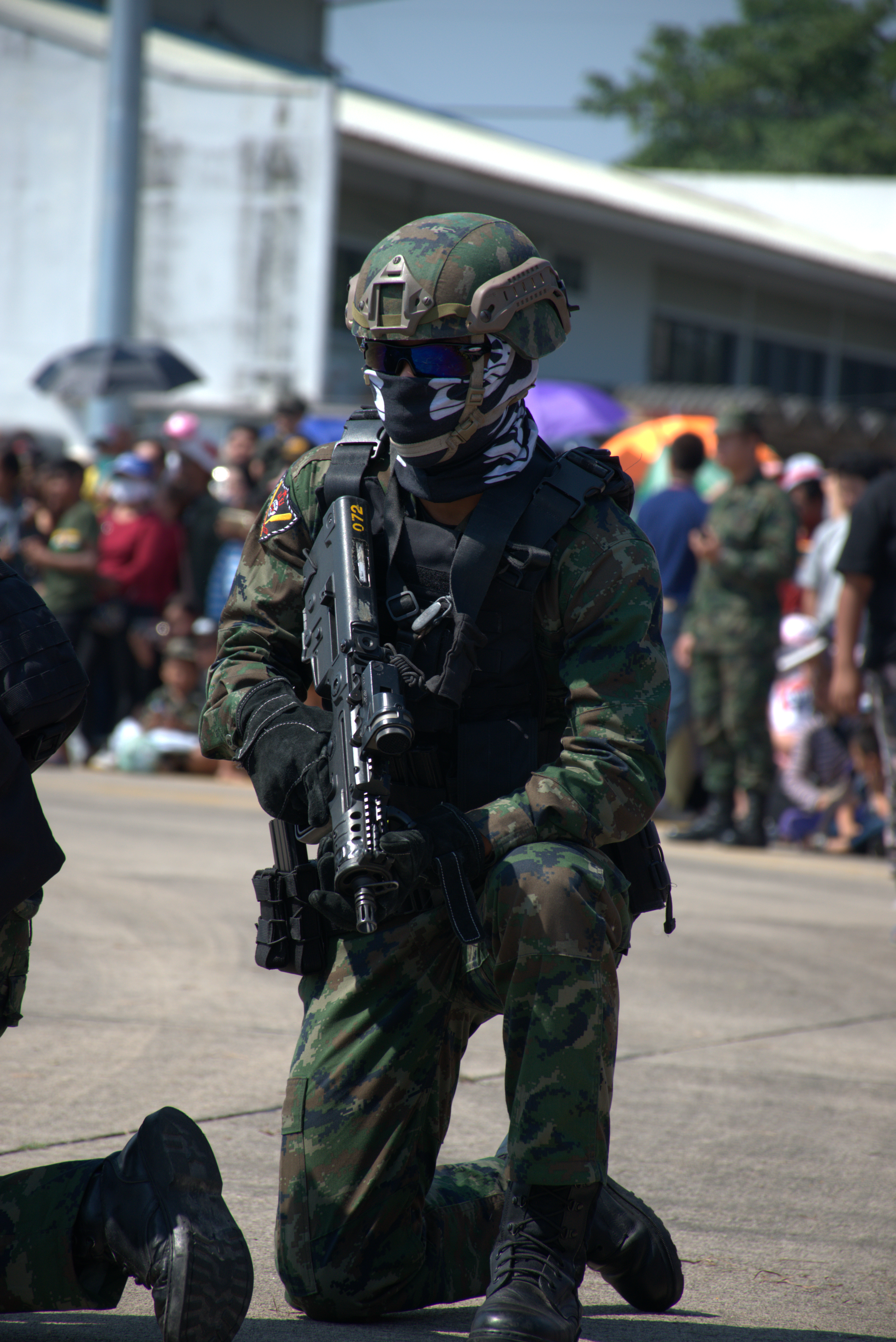
RTMC Recon holding IWI Tavor X95 at Thailand Children Day 2018

RTMC Reconnaissance Battalion also known as RECON

== Royal Thai Air Force ==
- Royal Thai Air Force Security Force Regiment
  - Special Operations Regiment also known as Air Force Commando
    - Command Center
      - 1st Special Operation Battalion (Commando)
      - 2nd Special Operation Battalion (PararescueJumper)
      - 3rd Special Operation Battalion (Combat Control Team)
    - Aerial Support Company
    - Combat Search and Rescue Center. (CSAR) also known as Pararescuemen
