= Task Force 90 =

Task Force 90 can refer to:

- Task Force 90 (Thailand), a special operations battalion of the Royal Thai Army
- Task Force 90 (United States), a former task force of the US Navy
