= Naval Special Warfare Command (Thailand) =

Special operations force within the Military of Thailand

Naval Special Warfare Command Royal Thai Navy SEALs
- หน่วยบัญชาการสงครามพิเศษทางเรือ
- Royal Thai Navy SEAL Emblem
- Active: Naval Special Warfare Command (2008–present); Naval Special Warfare Group (1991–2008); 1956 – present
- Country: Thailand
- Branch: Royal Thai Navy
- Type: Naval Special operations forces
- Part of: Royal Thai Fleet; Counter Terrorist Operations Center Royal Thai Armed Forces Headquarters
- Nicknames: Royal Thai Navy SEALs; Frog man
- Engagements: Cold War; Communist insurgency in Thailand; Third Indochina War; Vietnamese border raids in Thailand; Global war on terrorism; OEF - Horn of Africa; Combined Task Force 150; Anti-Piracy operation in Gulf of Aden; Southern Insurgency; Battle of Bacho (2013); Anti-Piracy in strait of Malacca; MT Orkim Harmony hijacking; Tham Luang cave rescue; Cambodia–Thailand border dispute; 2025 Cambodia–Thailand clashes
- Website: http://www2.fleet.navy.mi.th/nswc/index.php/main/index

The Naval Special Warfare Command (Thai: หน่วยบัญชาการสงครามพิเศษทางเรือ), commonly known as the Royal Thai Navy SEALs (an acronym for SEa–Air–Land), is an elite special operations force of the Royal Thai Navy.

The unit was set up in the name of Underwater Demolition Assault Unit in 1956 with the assistance of the U.S. government. A small element within the Navy SEALs has been trained to conduct maritime counter-terrorism missions. The unit has close ties with the United States Navy SEALs and conducts regular training exercises.

== History ==
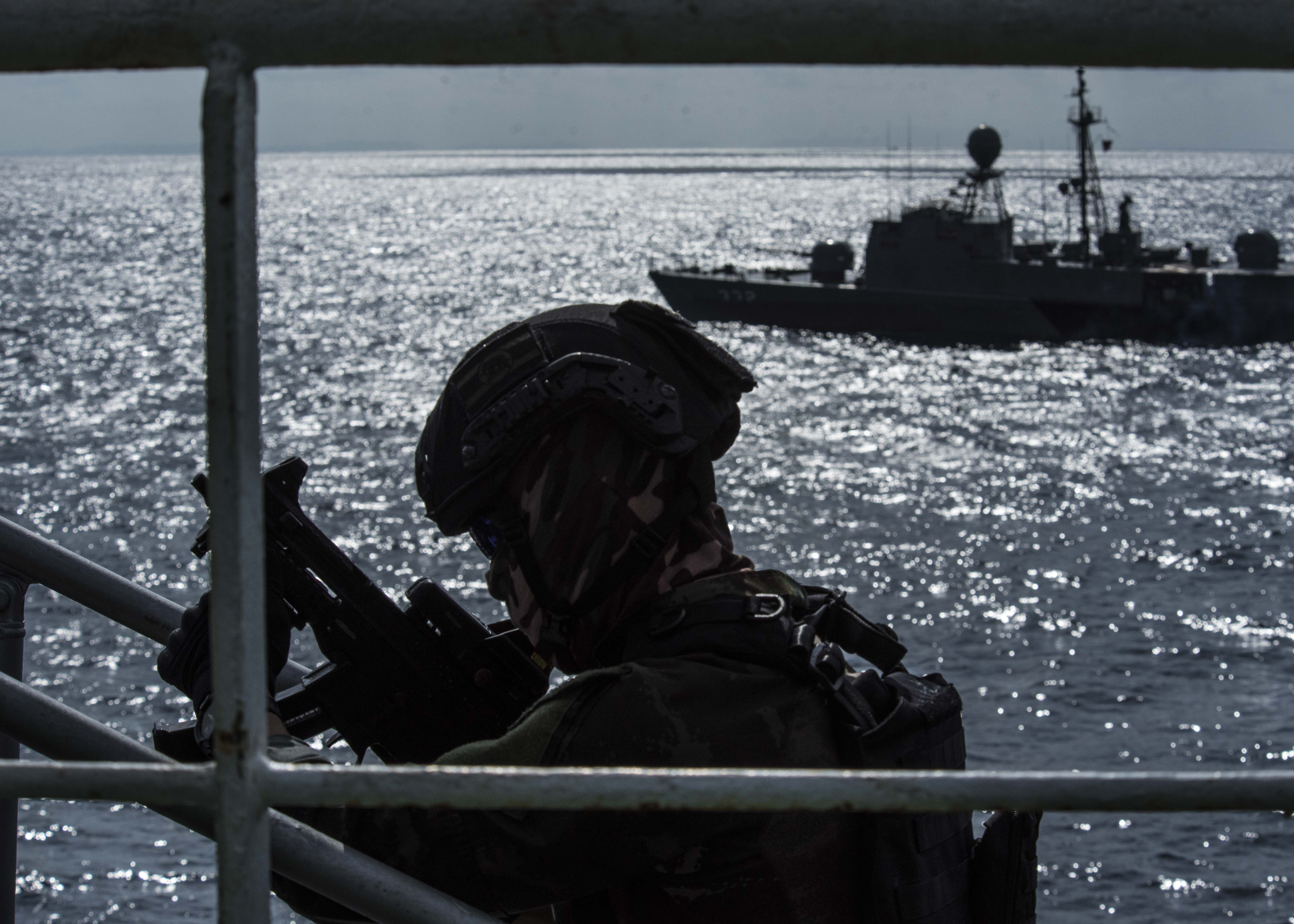
Royal Thai Navy SEALs

In 1952, the Thai Ministry of Defence considered forming a diving unit. At a meeting with the Royal Thai Army and Royal Thai Police, it was agreed that the Royal Thai Navy would be responsible for establishing the unit. Representatives of the Thai Navy met with officers from the United States Military Assistance Advisory Group (MAAG) to discuss possible training. On 13 June 1952, the Thai Navy approved the training program for the diving unit that included Underwater Demolition Team (UDT) training. Unfortunately at the time there were not enough instructors from the United States to conduct training, and so it was temporarily put on hold.

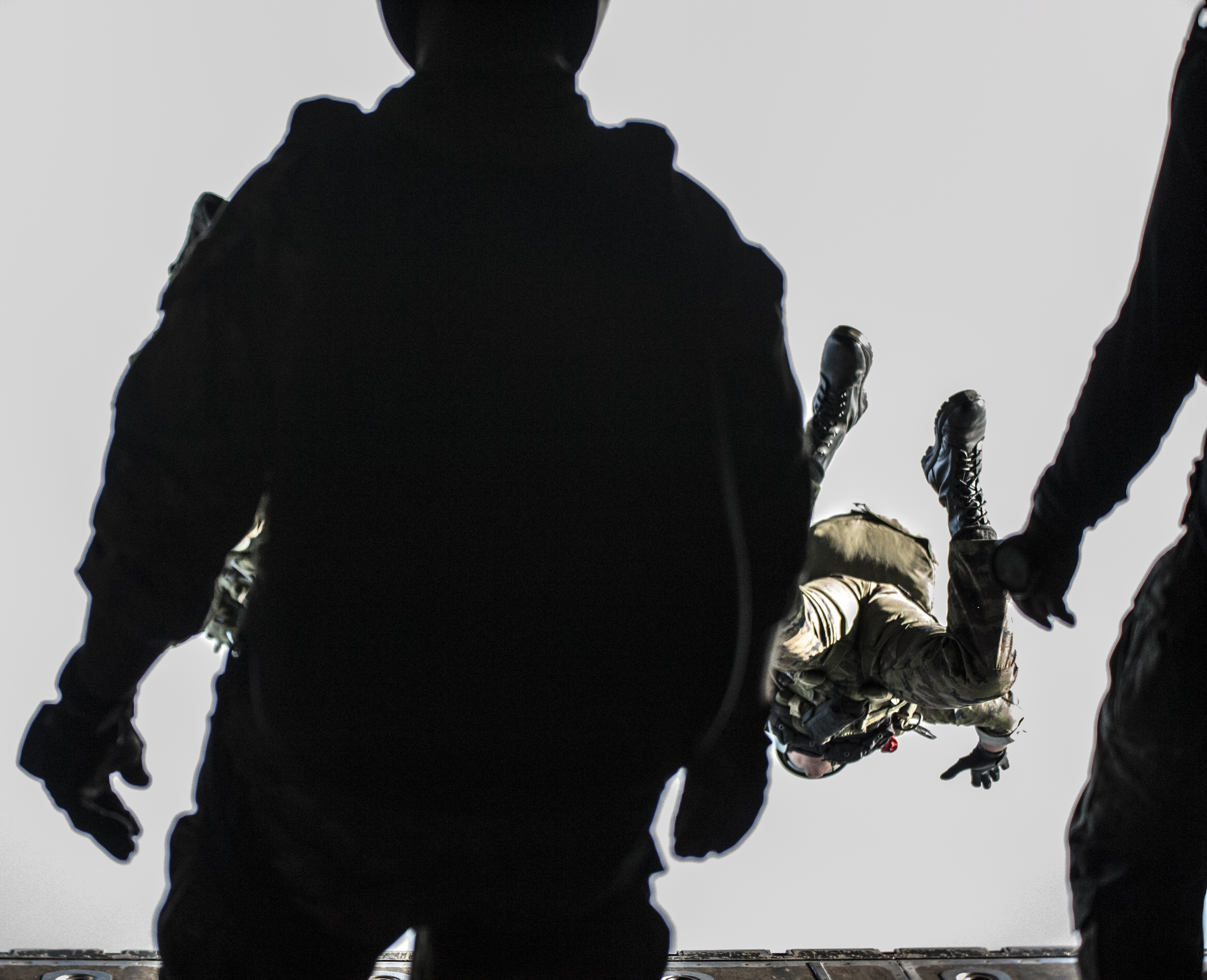
Royal Thai Navy SEALs during parachute training

In 1953, the Overseas Southeast Asia Supply Company (SEA Supply), a CIA front company that provided assistance to the Thai Police, offered to provide the initial diving training to the Thai Navy and also to the Thai Police, which had received parachute training. The Thai Navy approved a contingent of seven personnel and the Thai Police approved a contingent of eight personnel to receive training at Saipan island in the United States. At Saipan island, the Thai Navy and Thai Police received eleven weeks training. The Thai Navy contingent requested further training and the establishment of a Thai Navy Underwater Demolition Team on 24 November 1953 under the command of a Lieutenant.

In 1956, the Royal Thai Navy formed a small combat diver unit. In 1965, the unit was expanded and reorganized with US Navy assistance. Three years later, it was again reorganized with US Navy assistance, dividing the unit between an underwater demolitions team and a SEAL team. The UDT was tasked with salvage operations, obstacle clearance, and underwater demolitions. The SEAL team was tasked with reconnaissance and intelligence missions.

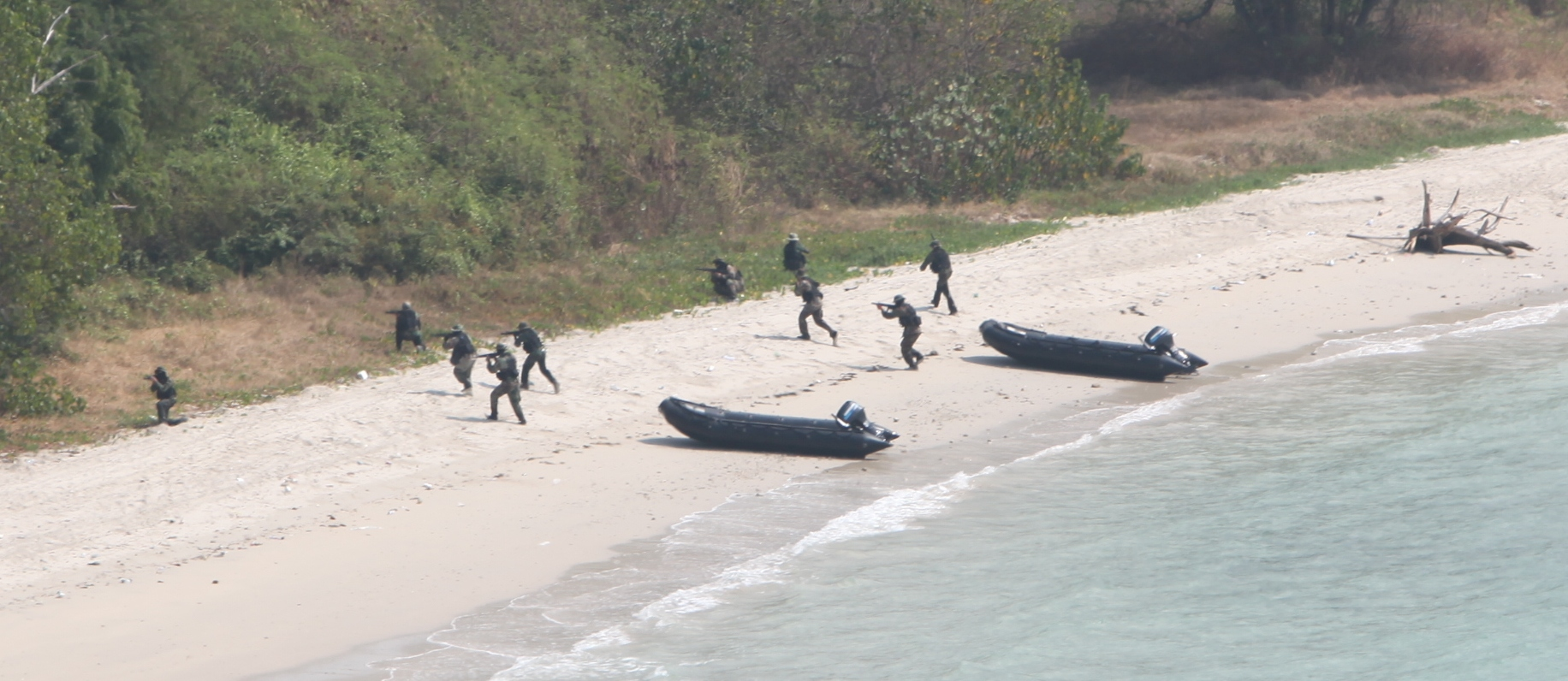
Royal Thai Navy SEALs storm the beach

In the 1991 book South-East Asian Special Forces by Kenneth Conboy, the author wrote that the Navy SEALs were organized into two units, SEAL Teams One and Two, with a strength of 144 personnel with each SEAL Team divided into four platoons. On 18 March 1991, the Navy SEALs were re-designated as the Naval Special Warfare Group, Royal Thai Fleet and were to report directly to the Royal Thai Fleet. The unit was expanded and organised into three divisions: special combat, special warfare school, and support.

On 7 August 2008, the Naval Special Warfare Group was re-designated as the Naval Special Warfare Command, Royal Thai Fleet, in order to increase the unit size and its capability for dealing with any future threats.

== Organization ==
- Naval Special Warfare Command Headquarter
  - Naval Special Warfare Training Center
  - 1st Naval Special Warfare Group
  - 2nd Naval Special Warfare Group

== Training Course ==
Training on an assault course takes about 7–8 months. It is considered the longest military training course in Thailand, divided into 5 periods as are following;

- Introduction to basic training practicing exercise and solving various obstacles takes approximately 3 weeks.*
- Actual training, lasting 6 weeks.
- Intense training, known as "Hell Week", lasting 120 hours continuously without breaks.
- Various tactical training
- Tactical training in real conditions, lasting approximately 2 months.

== Operational deployments ==
Map of areas under threat by Somali pirates (2005–2010)

Most of the operations of the Navy SEALs are highly sensitive and are rarely divulged to the public. Navy SEALs have been used to gather intelligence along the Thai border during times of heightened tension.

Navy SEALs have participated in anti-piracy operations in the Gulf of Thailand. They have also participated in salvage and rescue operations, and have supported Royal Thai Marine Corps training exercises.

Thai Navy SEALs have deployed on Royal Thai Navy warships for anti-piracy operations in the Gulf of Aden off the coast of Somalia as part of Combined Task Force 151. The CTF 151 was established on 12 January 2009 as a response to piracy attacks in Somalia. The task eventually were succeed as a piracy events in the region have been reduced.

On February 13, 2013, the Battle of Bacho occurred when 50 RKK members attacked a Royal Thai Marine base garrisoned by the 2nd Rifle Company, 32nd Task Force Narathiwat. The base had already prepared due to receiving clues about the plans to attack the stronghold 2–3 days before. The marine commander had put in a defensive strategy with reinforcements consisting of 11 members of Recon and 17 Thai Navy SEALs. The clash resulted in 16 attackers killed in action and no casualties on the Thai side.

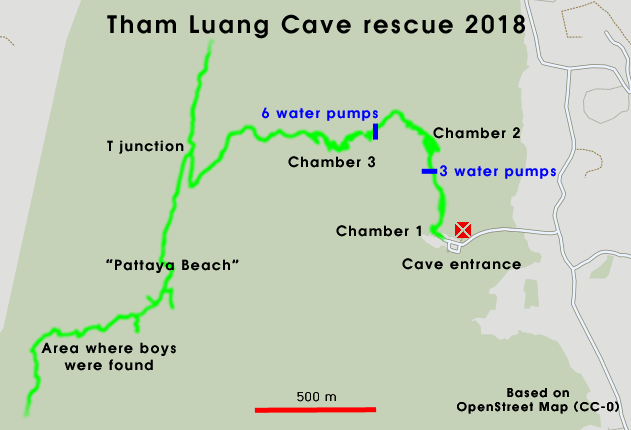
Tham Luang cave rescue map

In June 2018, Navy SEALs responded to a request for assistance to search for a junior football team in the Tham Luang Nang Non cave system. The Navy SEALs coordinated a rescue of the football team from the flooded cave system with assistance from international cave and support divers.

A total of 127 current and former Navy SEALs participated in the rescue. While delivering supplies for the rescue, former Navy SEAL Petty Officer 1st class Saman Kunan died after losing consciousness underwater and could not be resuscitated. A year after the rescue, another Navy SEAL, petty officer 1st class Beirut Pakbara died following a blood infection he contracted in the caves.

However, all junior football team members including 12 junior football players together with their assistant coach were safely rescued.

== Equipment ==
=== Small arms ===
Name	Origin	Type	Caliber	Notes
Pistol
H&K USP Compact	Germany	Semi-automatic pistol	9×19mm Parabellum	
Glock 19	Austria	Semi-automatic pistol	9×19mm Parabellum	
Heckler & Koch P7	Germany	Semi-automatic pistol	9×19mm Parabellum	P7M8
Assault rifle
Heckler & Koch G36	Germany	Assault rifle	5.56×45mm NATO	G36KV
SCAR-H and SCAR-L	Belgium	Assault rifle	7.62×51mm NATO 5.56×45mm NATO	SCAR-H and SCAR-L.
Bushmaster M4	United States	Assault rifle	5.56×45mm NATO	Carbon-15
SIG Sauer SIG516	Switzerland	Assault rifle	5.56×45mm NATO	
Grenade launcher
Heckler & Koch AG36	Germany	Grenade launcher	40mm	
Milkor MGL	South Africa	Grenade launcher	40mm	Milkor M32
Submachine gun
Heckler & Koch MP5	Germany	Submachine gun	9×19mm Parabellum	MP-5KA4/MP-5SD3
Heckler & Koch UMP	Germany	Submachine gun	9×19mm Parabellum	UMP-9
General-purpose machine gun
Heckler & Koch HK23E	Germany	General-purpose machine gun	5.56×45mm NATO	
M60 machine gun	United States	General-purpose machine gun	7.62 x 51mm NATO	U.S. Ordnance M60E4
Anti-materiel rifle and sniper rifle
KAC SR-25	United States	Designated marksman rifle	7.62 x 51mm NATO	
Heckler & Koch PSG1	Germany	Semi-automatic; Sniper rifle	7.62 x 51mm NATO	
Heckler & Koch MSG-90	Germany	Semi-automatic; Sniper rifle	7.62 x 51mm NATO	
Accuracy International AW50	United Kingdom	Anti-materiel rifle	12.7 x 99mm	
Barrett M82	United States	Anti-materiel rifle	12.7 x 99mm	
Barrett M98B	United States	Sniper rifle	.338 Lapua Magnum	

=== Special Operations Crafts ===
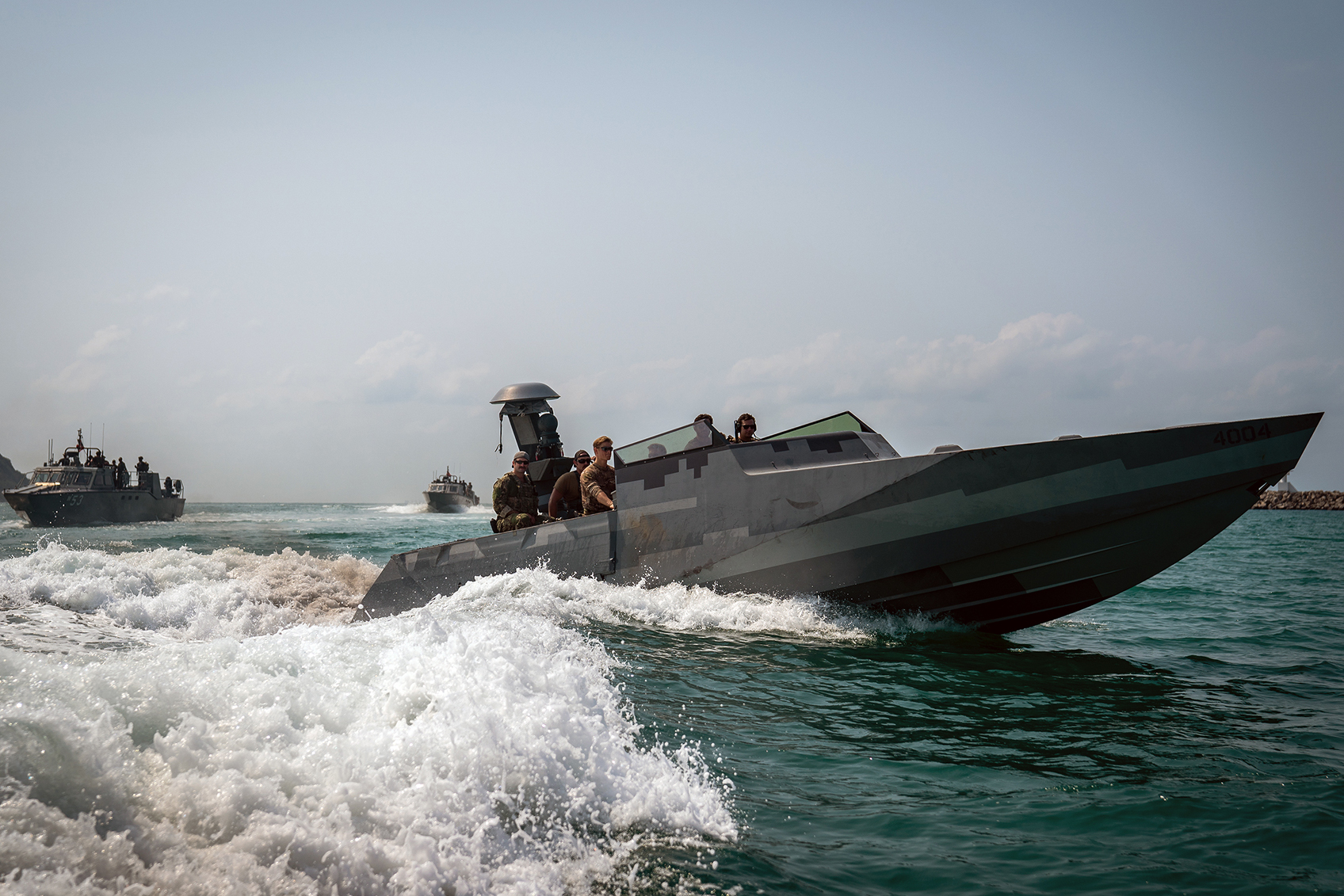
Seafox Mk.IV SWCL

Class	Origin	Type	Notes
Special Operations Craft
Por.51	Thailand	Special Operations Craft	4 x Marsun M18 FAB
Tor.241	United States	Special Operations Craft	3 x Seafox Mk.IV SWCL
Zodiac	France	Combat Rubber Raiding Craft	Zodiac Rigid-Hull Inflatable Boat (RHIB)

== Engagements ==
- Cold War
  - Communist insurgency in Thailand
  - Communist insurgency in Malaysia
  - Third Indochina War
  - Vietnamese border raids in Thailand
- Global war on terrorism
  - OEF - Horn of Africa
  - Combined Task Force 150
  - Anti-Piracy operation in Gulf of Aden
- Southern Insurgency
  - Battle of Bacho (2013)
- Anti-Piracy in strait of Malacca
  - MT Orkim Harmony hijacking
- Tham Luang cave rescue
- 2025 Cambodia–Thailand clashes

== In popular culture ==
- 2018: The Crown Princess is a Thai television series, premiered on May 14, 2018 and last aired on June 19, 2018 on Channel 3. It starred Urassaya Sperbund and Nadech Kugimiya and produced by Ann Thongprasom. Because her life was put into danger after her coronation, Crown Princess Alice (Urassaya Sperbund) of the country Hyross was secretly sent to Thailand, where Dawin Samuthyakorn (Nadech Kugimiya), a Lieutenant Commander of the Thai Navy and Navy SEAL, becomes her bodyguard.
- 2018: Against The Elements: Tham Luang Cave Rescue, a documentary with exclusive interviews produced by Channel News Asia in Singapore.
- 2018: Thai Cave Rescue, an episode of science television series Nova (season 45, episode 14).
- 2019: The Cave, a feature film written and directed by Thai-Irish filmmaker Tom Waller. It features many of the real-life cave divers as themselves.
- 2021: The Rescue, a National Geographic documentary released on 8 October 2021. The film made use of body-cam footage recorded by the divers involved in the operation.
- 2022: Thirteen Lives is a 2022 American biographical survival film based on the Tham Luang cave rescue directed and produced by Ron Howard, from a screenplay written by William Nicholson. The film stars Viggo Mortensen, Colin Farrell, Joel Edgerton, and Tom Bateman. Royal Thai Navy SEALs, led by Captain Arnont, arrive to search for the missing boys, but find the dive too difficult to locate the team. Vernon Unsworth, a local British caver, shares his extensive knowledge of the complex and dangerous cave and suggests the authorities get in touch with the British Cave Rescue Council. British cavers Rick Stanton and John Volanthen attempt the dive, finding the boys and coach four kilometres from the entrance. In an attempt to deliver wetsuits to the boys in preparation for the rescue, former Thai Navy Seal Saman Kunan drowns.
- 2022: Thai Cave Rescue, a Netflix limited series was released on September 22, 2022. It is the only dramatic production that was granted access to the members of the Wild Boars soccer team.
- 2022: The Trapped 13: How We Survived The Thai Cave, a Netflix documentary will release on October 5, 2022. The documentary features interviews with selected members of the Wild Boars team.

== See also ==
- Royal Thai Special Force
- Thai Force Reconnaissance Marine
- Royal Thai Air Force Security Force Regiment
- Royal Thai Air Force Commando
- Royal Thai Marine Corps

== Notes ==
Citations
