= Maw Pokay incident =

1984 military incident

- Part of Karen conflict
Date	12–13 March 1984
Location	Myanmar–Thailand border; Shan State, Myanmar and Mae Sot, Thailand
Result	Burmese forces driven back across border; Myanmar–Thailand relations further strained; Karens retain Maw Pokay

Belligerents
Thailand Karen National Union: Karen National Liberation Army	Burma

Units involved
Royal Thai Army Ranger	44th Light Infantry Division

Strength
Unknown	100–500

Casualties and losses
(Thailand) 2 killed 14–17 wounded 1 APC destroyed Unknown	10–15 killed Unknown wounded

The Maw Pokay incident, also known as the Maw Po Kay and Maw Pokey incident, was a border incursion where, during anti-Karen operations, the Burmese 44th Light Infantry crossed the Thailand border and skirmished with Thai border guards, resulting in fatalities.

== Incident ==
In January 1984, the armed forces of Burma launched an offensive operation against the Karen National Liberation Army, but met stiff resistance at the base of Maw Pokay, along the Moei River. In an attempt to break the stalemate a battalion of the 44th Light Infantry, reported varyingly to number between 100 and 500 soldiers, crossed over the Moei River, and thus the Myanmar–Thailand border, in an attempt to either encircle Maw Pokay or attack it from behind. The Burmese soon came into conflict with the Thai border police, and in the ensuing skirmishes 2 Thai border police were killed, with between 10 and 17 wounded, while the Burmese in turn suffered varying reports between 9 and 15 killed and an unknown number wounded. Some reports mentioned a Thai armoured personnel carrier being destroyed as well. The entrenched Burmese were ultimately forced to retreat across the border by a combined force of border guards, regular Thai Army soldiers, and Army Rangers. Some sources suggested the Karens opened fire upon the retreating Burmese forces as well.

== Aftermath ==
Burma's Ambassador to Thailand Ko Ko Gyi was called to the Foreign Ministry to hear a verbal protest by Thailand's undersecretary of state Arsa Sarasin.

Burma's military failed to take Maw Pokay during the duration of their 1984 offensive.
