= Operation Hardnose =

Central Intelligence Agency-run espionage operation

- Part of the Laotian Civil War and the Vietnam War
- Type: Espionage operation
- Location: Laos
- Planned: January 1963
- Planned by: Mike Deuel
- Commanded by: Mike Deuel, John F. Kennedy, Robert McNamara, William Westmoreland
- Objective: Report on activities on the Ho Chi Minh trail
- Date: August 1963—1972
- Executed by: CIA, PARU, MACV-SOG, Royal Thai Army Special Forces, Air America, USAF
- Outcome: Successful; superseded by the Hark-1 program

Operation Hardnose was a Central Intelligence Agency-run espionage operation spying upon the Ho Chi Minh trail that began during the Laotian Civil War. Started in Summer 1963, it soon attracted the attention of the U.S. Secretary of Defense, Robert McNamara. By December 1963, he was calling for its expansion. Operation Hardnose expanded and continued to report on the Ho Chi Minh trail even as American military intelligence activities mounted against the communist supply artery. In an attempt to adapt technology for use by illiterate Lao Theung, some of the U.S. Air Force's survival radios were modified by the CIA for use by their spies.

By 1968, Operation Hardnose was being marginalized by use of other intelligence systems, such as air- and ground-based electronic sensors. Also, with the advent of the AC-130 Spectre gunship, which both generated its own targets as well as struck them, there was little use for Hardnose spotting enemy vehicles. Hardnose faded into insignificance after that.

== Background ==
The Kingdom of Laos moved toward independence from the French following World War II. Having paid little attention to fostering local government during their colonization of Laos, the French left a nation woefully short of expertise and leadership. Nor were the French successfully coping with a Lao communist insurrection sponsored by the Vietnamese communists at the time they left Laos. However, the United States, which had assumed an ever greater burden of funding the Royal Lao Government, assumed the counter-insurgency effort against the communists. The resultant Laotian Civil War predated the Vietnam War; unlike in Vietnam, the Laotian war had to be fought under an assumption of secrecy because of the existence of an international treaty, the Geneva Conference (1954). So it was that the Central Intelligence Agency came to support and wage the Lao counter-insurgency.

== Operation Hardnose ==
Operation Hardnose was a road watch operation spying upon the Ho Chi Minh trail that began during the Laotian Civil War. The original concept of the operation was presented to President John F. Kennedy in January 1963. In Summer 1963, Central Intelligence Agency (CIA) case agent Mike Deuel shifted his base of operations from Nakhon Phanom, Thailand to Pakse, Laos. He acquired promising local agents from the Operation Pincushion program. After advanced training at Phitsanulok, Thailand, in Autumn 1963 the agents were assigned to road watch duties in the section of the Ho Chi Minh trail that ran through Military Region 4 of Laos. They based themselves near Houei Sai on the Bolaven Plateau. Aided by Team T of the Police Aerial Resupply Unit, the Lao Theung spies were so successful that within two months, their efforts were being lauded by U.S. Secretary of Defense Robert McNamara. By December 1963, McNamara was calling for Hardnose's expansion after a whirlwind two-day visit to Vietnam.

By May 1964, Operation Hardnose had 20 espionage teams surveilling roads and manning radios in the vicinity of Saravane, and southwards to the Cambodian border. By the turn of the year, there were calls for further expansion of Hardnose; additional Thai PARU trainers were brought in. By September, the Hardnose road watchers had reported 5,000 People's Army of Vietnam troops moving south along the Ho Chi Minh trail. This was half again as many infiltrators as had been reported for all of 1964. The quickly growing transportation network included a new road in progress, Route 911, which would trim a third of the distance between the Mụ Giạ Pass and Tchepone.

In September 1964, the Southeast Asia Coordination Meeting—a monthly session of U.S. ambassadors, CIA officials, and Department of Defense higherups—decided that Military Assistance Command, Vietnam should be running its own patrols into Operation Hardnose territory. On 7 March 1965, General William Westmoreland tasked the MACV-SOG with cross-border forays from South Vietnam into Laos. On 23 April 1965, Ambassador to Laos William H. Sullivan protested the new project as being what he deemed to be a rerun of the failed Operation White Star. Nor were ground incursions into the Laotian war the only influence of the Vietnam War on Lao operations. The Steel Tiger and Tiger Hound air operations zones were carved out of the Laotian Barrel Roll area and turned over to MACV to run from Vietnam. MACV-SOG also wanted to sponsor a guerrilla base zone east of the Bolovens Plateau between it and the Vietnamese border. By September 1965, MACV-SOG had overcome Sullivan's misgivings concerning Lao neutrality, and had Operation Shining Brass patrols probing the Ho Chi Minh trail from South Vietnam.

In October 1965, Mike Deuel had served his three-year tour of duty in Laos. On the 11th, Deuel took his replacement on an orientation flight to distribute the teams' payroll in Salavane. After their departure from there, their Air America Sikorsky H-34's engine quit some 24 kilometers (15 mi) outbound. The bodies of the helicopter's occupants were recovered from the crash by Auto Defense Choc militia on 14 October 1965.

By late 1965, Operation Hardnose was expanding again. In late October, a team of 21 Royal Thai Special Forces (RTSF) instructors had joined Hardnose at their newly opened base 27 kilometers (17 mi) southeast of Houei Kong. North of there, Siberia Training Camp was established 26 kilometers (16 mi) northeast of Savannakhet. This camp also received an allotment of RTSF trainers for Hardnose; the RTSF also duplicated the Hardnose program with its own Thai-operated Operation Star of four six-man road watch teams. In February 1966, three unmarked Operation Pony Express CH-3C helicopters were supplied to replace Air America in aerial transport of the Hardnose and Star teams. That same Spring, four teams were captured during a fortnight as the PAVN ramped up counter-surveillance.

Eleven more Pony Express helicopters were assigned in June 1966. However, the road watch operations were handicapped by the agents' low level of education, and by language barriers. In the latter half of 1966, there were ten Thai Star teams operating. A contingent of 50 specially recruited Thai agents was heli-lifted in teams into the Ho Chi Minh trail; after three months of failure, the teams were disbanded.

Various means of keeping track of traffic on the Ho Chi Minh trail were tried by the teams. In early 1967, the CIA's Technical Services Division forwarded a magnetic traffic sensor to be placed on the trail; however, it failed to keep accurate count or quit entirely. Finally, the CIA altered a U.S. Air Force survival radio into the Hark-1 radio, which had pictures of enemy troops and trucks next to push buttons. A road watch agent who could neither read nor write clicked a button for every soldier or truck counted; the tallies could be then be radioed to a relay aircraft overhead by the touch of another button.

== The Hark-1 program ==
In essence, Hark-1 superseded Operation Hardnose. New CIA trainers were forwarded to the old Hardnose camps in early 1967. The Hark-1 trainer who appeared in February found a troubled situation; the Thais were wrapped up in their Operation Star to the neglect of the CIA's road watch program. A Thai Special Forces Team was promptly dedicated solely to training road watchers, and training facilities for them were expanded. After losing a Continental Air Services, Inc pilot in a fatal crash on 12 March 1967, the Hark-1 program had Air America take over the duty of supplying the airborne radio link to the Hark-1s.

The Hark-1 Teams now operated in three zones. The southernmost of these sectors centered on Tchepone, but extended southward to Cambodia. The central section of Hark-1 Teams targeted the Mụ Giạ Pass area; during 1967, 15 teams operated there, with two rotating station within the pass itself. The third Hark-1 zone was Nape Pass. By contrast with American reconnaissance teams, the Lao often unobtrusively hiked long distances into their operational area instead of being inserted by helicopter. Nor were the Lao limited to team service; by now, they had begun to take over recruit training from the Thais.

Hark-1 teams stayed in place as long as they went undiscovered and had supplies; some stayed on station for months. Other than occasional cameras, and a short-lived experimentation with night vision scopes, they were sparsely but adequately equipped. The 1967 traffic count showed a 165% increase in trucks on the Trail compared to 1966. Some 4,260 southbound vehicles, and 4,200 northbound, were noted between October 1967 and June 1968. By mid-1968, each of the three Hark-1 zones had about 25 teams in the field.

However, U.S. pilots claimed 6,600 trucks destroyed along the trail during the same period. This mismatch in numbers, combined with a sensor surveillance program begun in late 1967, cast doubt on the accuracy of the road watch teams. More importantly, the February 1968 advent of AC-130 Spectre gunships with all their onboard electronic surveillance rendered ground observation largely obsolete. A new military intelligence processing center called Task Force Alpha opened at Nakhon Phanom to collate all sources of information from the trail. By Summer 1969, the road watch teams were dwindling away. The ever-increasing countermeasures of enemy foot patrols and use of tracker dogs also had its effect. In any event, the U.S. air effort against PAVN trucks had reached its limit; it became obvious that no matter the true truck count, air strikes were not going to halt the infiltration.

In February 1970, a newly arrived case officer took over the roadwatch program in Military Region IV which had never stopped carrying out roadwatching missions. Based on experience at CIA Headquarters (the road watch reports, having outlived any usefulness, were being ignored) and during his first months running it in-country he shut down roadwatching missions and for the remainder of his two-year assignment he used the former roadwatching assets for other intelligence collection missions.
