= Battle of Bacho (2013) =

Battle of the South Thailand Insurgency

Battle of Bacho (2013) ยุทธการที่บาเจาะ พ.ศ. 2556 Pertempuran Bacho (2013)
- Part of South Thailand insurgency
Date	13 February 2013
Location	2nd Rifle Company Base, 32nd Task Force Narathiwat, Bacho District, Narathiwat Province
Result	Royal Thai Marine Corps victory

Belligerents
2nd Rifle Company, 32nd Task Force Narathiwat Support Units; Royal Thai Navy SEALs; RECON	Runda Kumpulan Kecil (RKK)

Commanders and leaders
Captain Somkiat Ponprayun	Maroso Chantrawadee †

Strength
Royal Thai Marines 120 members: Royal Thai Navy SEALs 17 members; RECON 11 members	RKK >50 members

Casualties and losses
None	16 killed

The Battle of Bacho (Thai: การปะทะที่บาเจาะ; Malay: Pertempuran Bacho) was a battle during the South Thailand insurgency between forces of the Royal Thai Marine Corps (RTMC) and Runda Kumpulan Kecil (RKK) insurgents, which began when the latter attacked a Thai marines base in Bacho District, Narathiwat Province on 13 February 2013. At least 16 RKK insurgents, including a commander, were killed while none of the Royal Thai Marines and Royal Thai Navy SEALs defenders of the base were injured.

== Battle ==
At 1:00 am local time on February 13, 2013, RKK insurgents launched an attack on a marine base, Bacho District in Narathiwat Province, and were led by Maroso Chantrawadee. Due to receiving clues about the plans to attack the stronghold in the last few days, Somkiat Pholprayoon had reinforced the base. With the support of the Royal Thai Navy SEALs and the RTMC Reconnaissance Battalion, the Thai marines base was able to be defended while losing no men deaths.

== Aftermath ==
15 days after the battle on February 28, Thailand agreed to hold peace negotiations with the Barisan Revolusi Nasional (BRN). The two then held the peace negotiations on March 28 in Kuala Lumpur.
