= Royal Thai Army Ranger =

Special operations force of the Royal Thai Army

Ranger Battalion 3rd Special Forces Regiment
- กองพันจู่โจม กรมรบพิเศษที่ 3
- Unit insignia
- Active: June 21st 1988–present
- Country: Thailand
- Allegiance: HM The King of Thailand
- Branch: Royal Thai Army
- Type: Airborne forces Light infantry Special operations forces
- Size: Battalion
- Part of: Royal Thai Army Special Warfare Command
- Garrison/HQ: Khao Sam Yot, Mueang Lopburi, Lopburi, Thailand
- Nickname(s): เรนเจอร์ (Ranger) สามเหลี่ยมปีศาจ (Devil's Triangle) กองพันปีศาจ (Devil's Battalion)
- Motto(s): ข้าคือผู้นำ (Rangers Lead the Way)
- Mascot(s): Tiger
- Engagements: Internal conflict in Myanmar: Maw Pokay incident; Operation Border Post 9631; Southern Insurgency; Cambodian–Thai border dispute
- Website: swcom.rta.mi.th/index.php

The Ranger Battalion, 3rd Special Forces Regiment (Thai: กองพันจู่โจม กรมรบพิเศษที่ 3) (พัน.จจ.รพศ.3) also known as Royal Thai Army Ranger (Thai: กองพันจู่โจม) is a Light infantry and Special operations Battalion of the Royal Thai Army. It is a part of the 3rd Special Forces Regiment, King's Guard Royal Thai Army Special Warfare Command. The unit is composed of the Ranger Company and Special Operation Company.

== History ==
The Ranger Battalion was established in response to a shortage of units capable of carrying out direct operations abroad that possessed the qualities of agility, speed, and rapid assault—based on past operations that had given strategic advantages to Thai forces, such as those at Chong Bok and Ban Rom Klao.

Consequently, the Royal Thai Army founded the Ranger Battalion under the classified Army Order (Special) No. 121/31, dated June 31, 1988, placing it under the command of the Special Warfare Command. The unit was modeled after the U.S. Army’s 75th Ranger Regiment and was initially based at the 2nd Paratrooper Special Combat Building, King Narai Camp, Lopburi.

In 1992, it was relocated to its current base at Ban Nam Chan, Khao Sam Yot Subdistrict, Mueang Lopburi District, Lopburi Province.

Additionally, Task Force 90 (TF-90), which was then called the "Special Operations Company," was placed under the direct command of the Ranger Battalion on October 1, 1992. Later, in 2000, the Royal Thai Army issued a classified (special) order No. 124/43, dated November 1, 2000, restructuring the Ranger Battalion from being directly under the Special Warfare Command to being subordinated to the 3rd Special Forces Regiment.

TF-90 was also removed from the Ranger Battalion’s command and placed directly under the 3rd Special Forces Regiment as the "Special Operations Company" (SOC).

This marked its separation from the Ranger Battalion. The unit was later elevated to become the Special Operations Battalion of the 3rd Special Forces Regiment.

In 2013, the Ranger Battalion was authorized to establish a 3rd Ranger Company.

== Modern Ranger selection and training ==
The Ranger Battalion, 3rd Special Forces Regiment, specifies the qualifications for enlisted (volunteer) soldiers as follows:

- Must be a Thai citizen with both parents holding Thai nationality by birth
- Aged between 18–25 years and must have completed conscription (those who completed Territorial Defense training from Year 3 onward or are in the reserves are not eligible)
- Must have completed at least Mathayom 6 (Grade 12 or equivalent)
- Must have normal vision, no astigmatism, and no color blindness
- Must not be currently suspended or discharged from government service
- Must not be a suspect or defendant in a criminal case
- Must have no visible tattoos outside areas covered by clothing
- Must be in good physical health

== Organization ==
- Ranger Battalion Headquarters
  - 1st Ranger Company
  - 2nd Ranger Company
  - 3rd Ranger Company
