= RTMC Reconnaissance Battalion =

Special operations force of the Royal Thai Marine Corps

Reconnaissance Battalion Royal Thai Marine Division
- กองพันลาดตระเวน กองพลนาวิกโยธิน
- Reconnaissance Battalion insignia.
- Active: 1942–1958 (Reconnaissance Patrol); 1958–1962 (Reconnaissance Company); 1962–1978 (Force Reconnaissance Battalion); 1980 (Similar to the founding day)-present
- Country: Thailand
- Branch: Royal Thai Marine Corps
- Type: Special operations forces
- Size: Battalion
- Part of: Royal Thai Marines Division
- Garrison/HQ: Sattahip, Chonburi
- Nickname: RECON (รีคอน)
- Engagements: Cold War; Communist insurgency in Thailand; Communist insurgency in Malaysia; Vietnamese border raids in Thailand; Southern Insurgency; Battle of Bacho (2013); Cambodia–Thailand border dispute; 2025 Cambodia–Thailand clashes

Commanders
- Current commander: Cmdr. Kweewat Kaengkarn (น.ท กวีวัฒน์ เก่งการ)

The Reconnaissance Battalion or RECON (Thai: กองพันลาดตระเวน กองพลนาวิกโยธิน), is an elite special operations forces unit organic to the Royal Thai Marine Corps (RTMC). It is highly specialized and capable of projecting combat power in the form of Marine Special Operations across land, maritime, and air domains.

== History ==
On February 24, 1942, the Royal Thai Navy (RTN) officially established the Marine Regiment at the Sattahip Naval Station. Its organizational structure comprised a division made up of one artillery company, two infantry battalions (1st and 2nd Marines), along with a small artillery unit and a heavy machine gun company. Additional support forces included a reconnaissance company (utilizing horses) and an engineer company squadron. In 1955, command of the regiment was formally assigned to Military Commander Kham Hiran (then holding that rank).

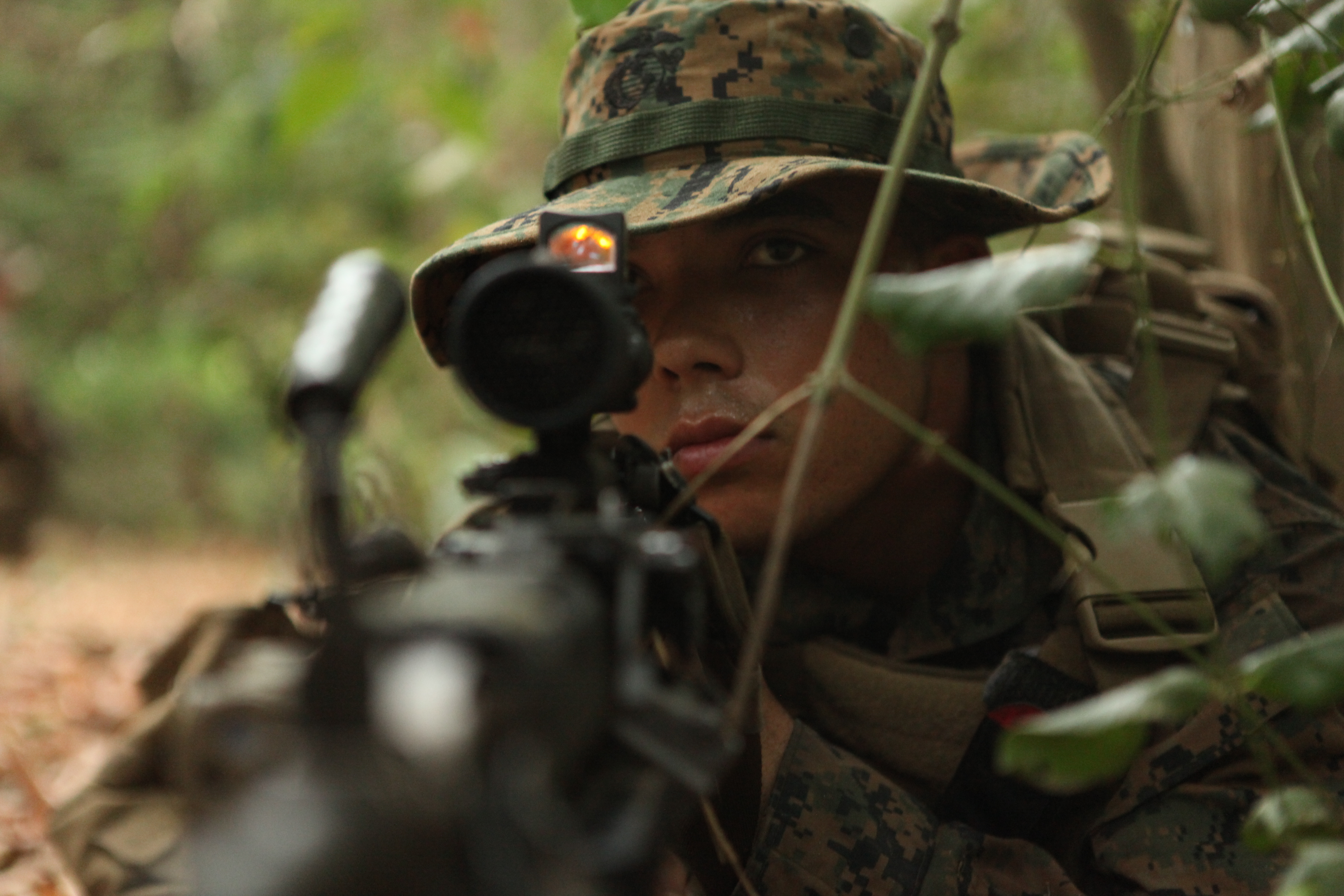
Recon Camp, Kingdom of Thailand

After the conclusion of the Indochina–France dispute, the Navy reorganized and strengthened the Marine Corps. The new structure included two infantry Marine battalions—the 1st Marine Battalion and the 2nd Marine Battalion—alongside two artillery battalions: one heavy machine gun battalion and one artillery battalion, designated as the 4th Marine Battalion, equipped with a mountain artillery regiment. Additionally, the Corps fielded two 75 mm Bofors artillery battalions (40 caliber, similar to those used by the Army).

A combat vehicle squadron, equivalent to a battalion, was also established. It consisted of four companies armed with 20 mm and 37 mm anti-tank guns and 50 mm grenade launchers. Supporting this force were three additional company-sized units: the Mechanic Division, the Communications Division, and the Patrol Division—all directly subordinate to the Marines.

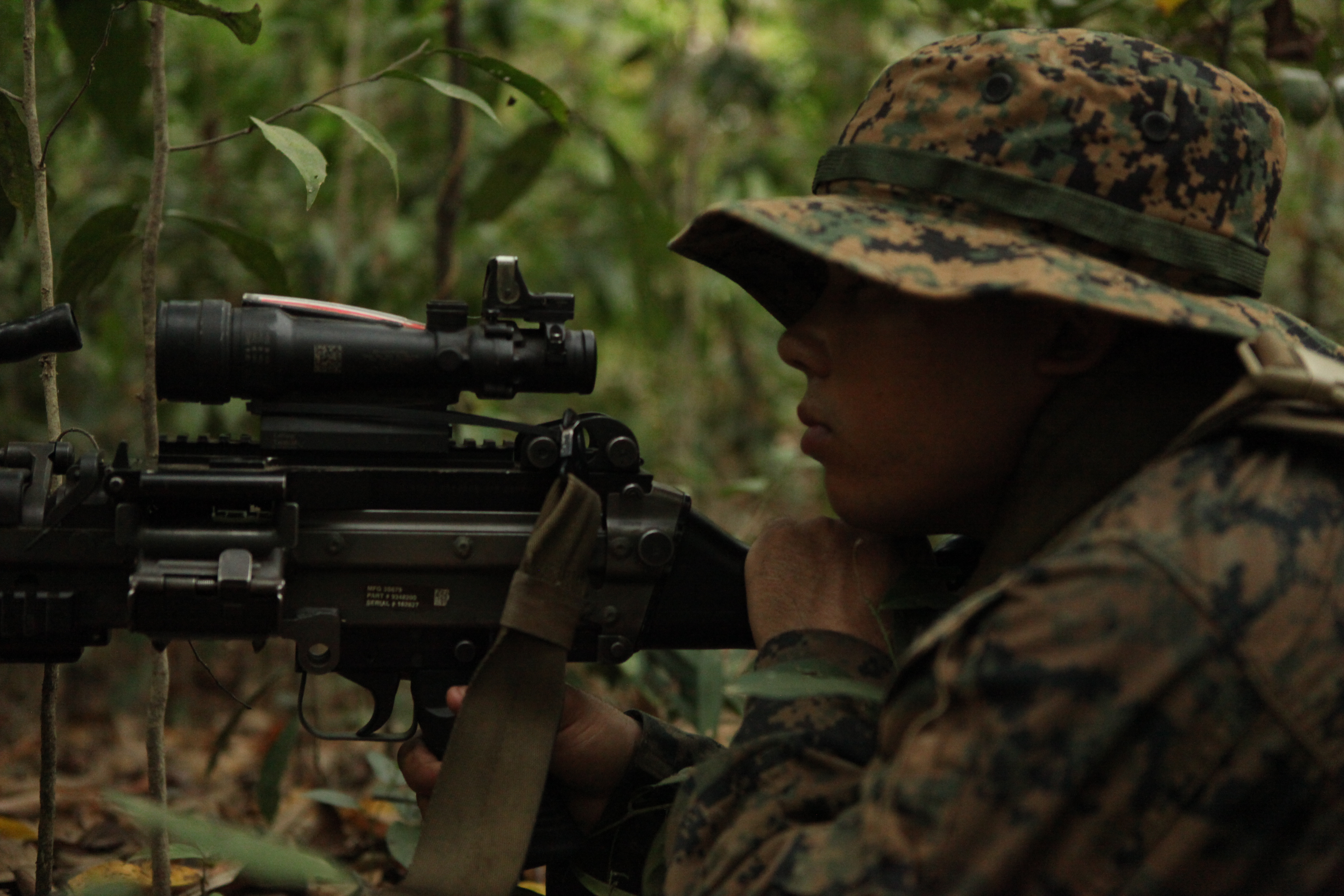
Recon Camp, Kingdom of Thailand

In 1965, the Royal Thai Marine Corps (RTMC) established the Reconnaissance Company, tasked with conducting amphibious reconnaissance to shape future amphibious warfare operations. Its core mandates encompassed direct action, irregular warfare, Marine Special Operations in denied areas, and tactical reconnaissance across hazardous terrain, as well as supporting maritime interdiction and VBSS operations. To meet expanding operational requirements, the company was officially expanded and redesignated as the Reconnaissance Battalion on 27 November 1978. Today, the battalion is composed of a headquarters company (with an attached wardog platoon), one amphibious reconnaissance company, and two V-150 patrol vehicle companies. It is commanded by an RTMC lieutenant colonel and remains based at Sattahip.

A small number of Marine Recon members saw combat in 1972, when they were deployed to Laos as part of Volunteer Battalion Commando 61G, which fought on the Plain of Jars. In terms of organizational structure, Recon Battalion companies are assigned to RTMC regiments on an as-needed basis. During these operations, the Marine Recon personnel demonstrated maximum efficiency in small-unit ambush tactics and tactical intelligence collection within high-risk areas, frequently encountering enemy patrols or larger hostile forces. Their actions inflicted severe damage on opposing forces, particularly by disrupting enemy logistics.

Since 1975, Royal Thai Marines have deployed reconnaissance teams to Narathiwat. In 1977, they successfully overran a communist insurgent base at Krung Ching in Nakhon Si Thammarat Province, securing the area until 1981. In December 1978, operations expanded as teams from the newly formed Reconnaissance Battalion were dispatched to the Mekong River during border skirmishes with the Pathet Lao.

In 1988, the Royal Thai Marine Corps formed a Marine Recon Anti-Terrorist Team. The following year, one company was attached to an RTMC task force in Chanthaburi for operations along the Thai–Cambodian border. Recon personnel are airborne-qualified through the RTMC parachute school at Sattahip, where they complete eight jumps, including one night jump and two water jumps. In addition, all Recon Marines must complete a rigorous three-month amphibious reconnaissance course at the base, which covers advanced air, land, and sea tactics.

On 13 February 2013, the Battle of Bacho commenced when approximately 50 Runda Kumpulan Kecil (RKK) insurgents undertook an assault on the Royal Thai Marine forward operating base held by the 2nd Rifle Company, 32nd Task Force Narathiwat. Anticipating the attack from military intelligence received days prior, the Marine commander reinforced the defensive position by deploying 11 Recon Marines and 17 Royal Thai Navy SEALs. This readiness ensured the infantry Marine defenders were prepared for the engagement, inflicting heavy casualties on the insurgent group. The clash ended with 16 insurgents killed, while no casualties were sustained by either the Recon Marines or the Navy SEALs.

== Organization ==
- **Reconnaissance Battalion Headquarter**
  - 1st Amphibious Reconnaissance Company
  - 2nd Amphibious Reconnaissance Company
  - Long-range Reconnaissance Patrol Company
  - Service Support Company
    - Marine Working Dog Platoon (Explosive and Drug Detection Dog)

== Mission and training ==
The Reconnaissance Battalion is mandated to project task-organized, rapidly deployable forces capable of conducting amphibious and special Reconnaissance; shaping the operational environment through precision Direct Action and deep penetration operations; executing close-quarters combat (CQC) and advanced insertion/extraction in denied areas; and performing Marine Special Operations, including maritime interdiction/VBSS. Furthermore, the battalion delivers specialized counterterrorism capabilities, focusing primarily on domestic operations while maintaining a highly trained readiness to execute international tactical counterterrorism missions in alignment with global frameworks and joint alliances.

=== Training ===
The Recon program prepares its students to lead amphibious assaults and operate independently far from allied support, demanding an exceptionally high level of competency and leadership. Reconnaissance Battalion operators are trained to operate on land, at sea, and in the air, earning them the distinctive nickname “3D Warriors.”

The Recon training course is widely regarded as one of the most challenging in Thai military special operations. As the saying goes, “The SEALs have a Hell Week, but it’s Hell EVERY Week in the RECON” (ซีลมีสัปดาห์นรก แต่รีคอนนรกทุกสัปดาห์).

Applicants must be active members of the Navy—or, by quota and invitation, other armed services or the police—and must not exceed 35 years of age.

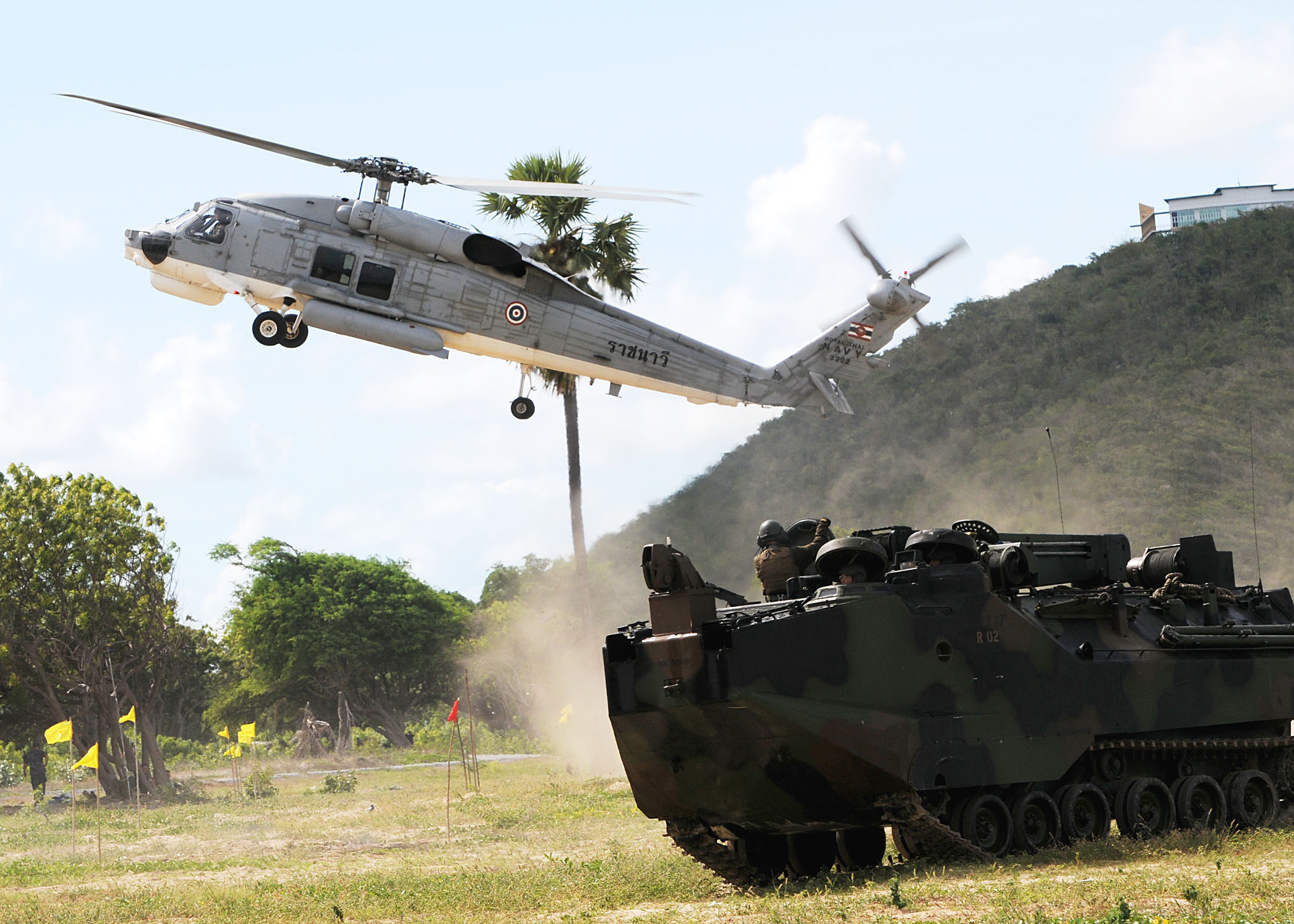
A Navy helicopter prepares to insert Royal Thai marines on the beach

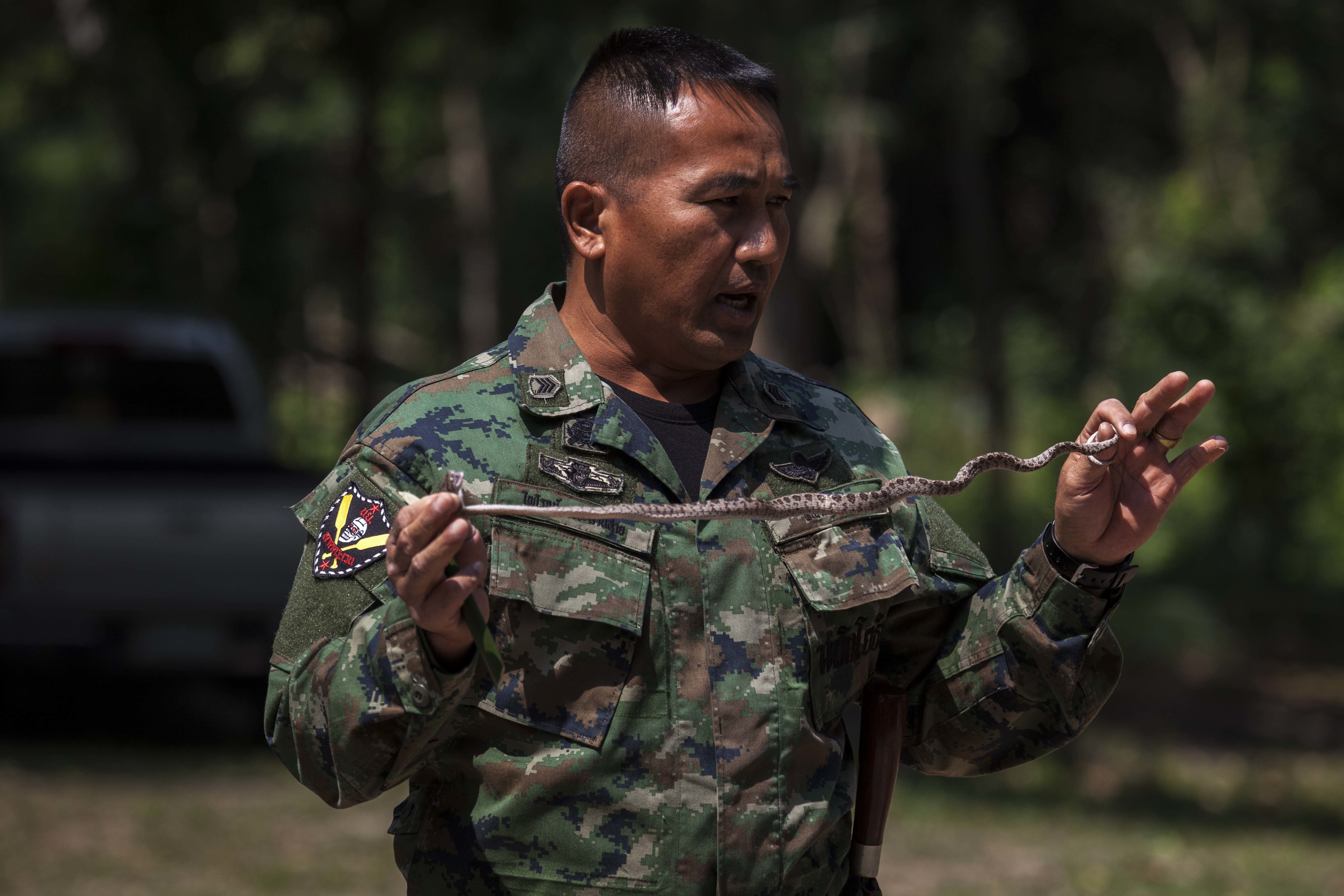
Jungle Survival Training

The Recon training course lasts 13 weeks, structured into three phases: 5 weeks focused on base missions, 4 weeks on maritime operations—which include paddling a resistant rubber boat for 15 nautical miles (27 km), carrying the boat for roughly 10 km without rest, and swimming 5 nautical miles (9.6 km)—and the final 4 weeks in jungle and mountain environments.

Instructors challenge students with complex tasks designed to push both physical and mental limits, increasing the overall difficulty of the program. Trainees also face a “Prisoner of War” scenario, simulating capture and interrogation by the enemy. The course culminates in a grueling 72-hour final mission, during which Recon students must operate continuously without sleep for three days and nights.

Graduates of the Recon training program earn the right to wear the Recon badge, regardless of their service branch. Recognized as one of the most demanding special operations courses in Thailand, it ranks above other prestigious qualifications, including the Queen's Musketeers, SEALs, and Rangers. Consequently, Recon has become highly coveted among “wing hunters”—servicemembers who aim to complete multiple elite special operations programs across the country.

== Equipment ==
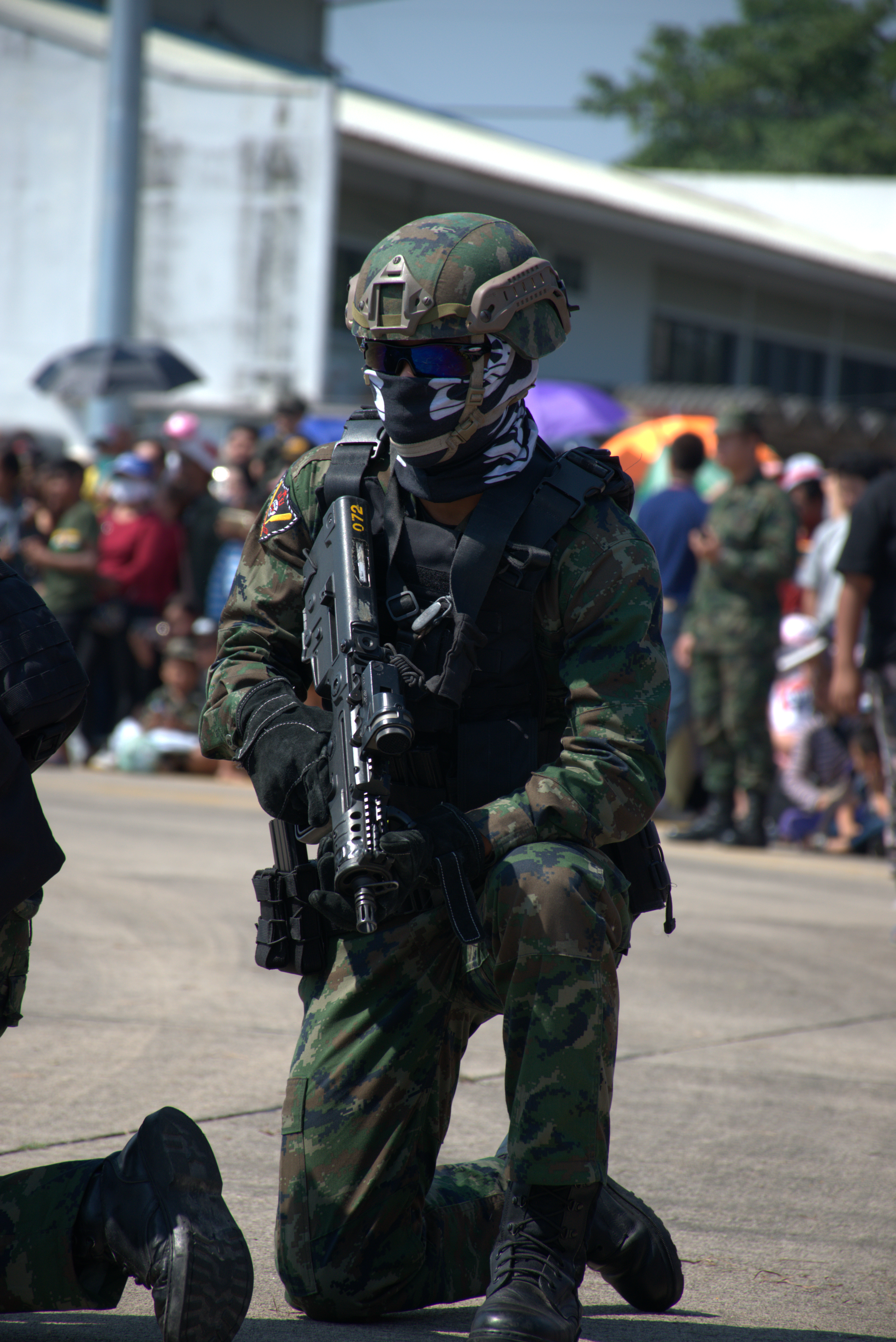
RTMC Recon operator armed with an IWI Tavor X95

Name	Origin	Type	Caliber	Notes
Pistol
Browning Hi-Power	Belgium	Semi-automatic pistol	9×19mm Parabellum	Fabrique Nationale Browning High Power.
Assault rifle
IWI X95	Israel	Assault rifle	5.56×45mm NATO	
G36C	Germany	Assault rifle	5.56×45mm	
Sniper rifle
Sako Defence Tikka	Finland	Sniper rifle	5.56×45mm.338 Lapua	
Shotguns
Remington Model 1100	United States	Shotgun	12 gauge	
Machine guns
M249	United States	Light machine gun	5.56×45mm	
M60	United States	General-purpose machine gun	7.62×51mm	
Grenade launcher
M203	United States	Grenade launcher	40 mm	

== Engagements ==
- **Cold War**
  - Communist insurgency in Thailand
  - Communist insurgency in Malaysia
  - Vietnamese border raids in Thailand
- **Southern Insurgency**
  - Battle of Bacho (2013)
- **2025 Cambodia–Thailand clashes**

== See also ==
- Royal Thai Special Force
- Royal Thai Navy SEALs
- Royal Thai Air Force Security Force Regiment
- Royal Thai Air Force Commando
- Royal Thai Marine Corps
- Border Patrol Police
- United States Marine Corps
- Marine Force Recon

== Cited books ==
- Bennett, Richard M. (2003). Elite Forces : The World's Most Formidable Secret Armies. London: Virgin Books. ISBN 9780753522813.
- Conboy, Kenneth (1991). South-East Asian Special Forces. Elite series;no.32. London: Osprey Publishing. ISBN 9781855321069.
