= Operation Pony Express =

Part of the Vietnam War (1965–1969)

- Part of Vietnam War
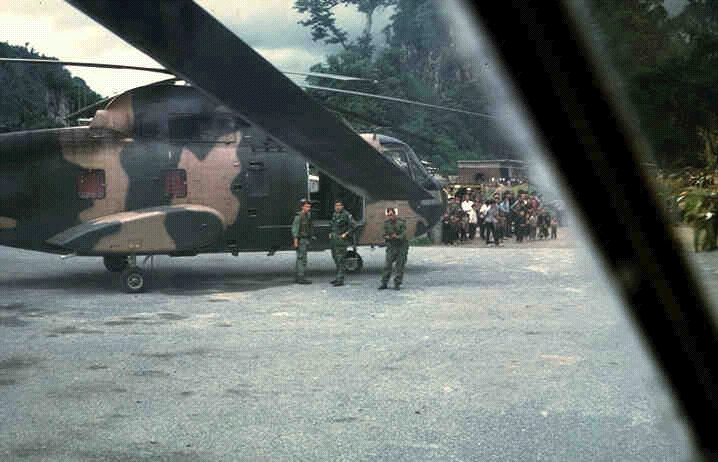
- Helicopters and pilots of the 20th SOS at a helicopter base designated Lima Site 20A, June 1969
Date	1965–1969
Location	Across the borders of Laos, Cambodia and North Vietnam

Belligerents
United States: 20th Helicopter Squadron; Air America; South Vietnam; Thailand	North Vietnam

Operation Pony Express was the covert transportation of, and the provision of aerial support for, indigenous soldiers and material operating across the Laotian and North Vietnamese borders during the Vietnam War. It was provided by Sikorsky CH-3C helicopters of the US 20th Helicopter Squadron, the only USAF combat helicopter squadron in Vietnam, which had been transferred there in 1965 and was known as the "Pony Express".

== History ==
The 20th Helicopter Squadron was formed at Eglin AFB, Florida in November 1965 under the command of Lt. Col Lawrence Cummings. Training was provided by the 4401st Helicopter Squadron, under the "PONY EXPRESS" Project. The pilots selected were the most experienced CH-3B/C pilots in the Air Force at the time since the CH-3B/C had been operational with the USAF for a very short period of time. After a month of training and checkout, the Squadron was deployed to South Vietnam in November 1965. The Squadron initially was stationed at Tan Son Nhut Air Base near Saigon. The CH-3C helicopters, which had been disassembled and flown to Vietnam in C-133 aircraft, were then assembled and readied for duty. The Squadron was split into three flights; one stayed at Tan Son Nhut under the command of Major Richard Burdett. Another flight was sent to Danang Air Base under the command of Major Herbert Zehnder with six CH-3C aircraft. The third flight was assigned to Cam Ranh Bay.

== Mission ==
The flight at Da Nang performed several missions in the six months they were located there. One of the missions was to support the Forward Air Controller units at the Kham Duc and Khe Sahn Green Beret bases, which involved carrying 500 gallon fuel cells and Conex boxes of supplies on the cargo sling. The flight performed many general support missions such as retrieving downed Marine H-34 and Huey helicopters from remote sites, slinging fully equipped radio jeeps to hilltop reconnaissance sites; and ferrying wounded soldiers to the hospital at Da Nang or to the Hospital Ship USS Repose which was stationed off the coast of Da Nang. One major mission was to work with the Marines to support Operation Double Eagle by emplacing 105 mm Howitzers at forward firing positions by carrying them on the cargo sling under the aircraft and placing them in position at the forward firing site. One of the Pony pilots was awarded the Silver Star when he was diverted on the way back from Dong Ha to evacuate wounded soldiers from the A Shau Valley which was under attack by heavy mortar and machine gun fire. He escaped ground fire after takeoff by immediately pulling up into the low-lying clouds.

In late spring of 1966, the flights at Cam Ranh Bay and Da Nang were reassigned to Udorn RTAFB in Thailand under headquarters 14th Command Support Group, Nha Trang, South Vietnam. The designated radio call sign was "Pony Express". There they again performed a number of missions including support of anti-terrorist operations of the Thai Army. During the monsoon season the CH-3C helicopters were used to fly critical supplies and medical personnel to outlying villages which were cut off from road supply by the muddy roads. The Ponies also had the mission of engaging in classified Counterinsurgency flights into Laos and North Vietnam. In 1968 the unit was PCS to Udorn.

== Background ==
The Ho Chi Minh trail, the logistical system that supplied the manpower and materiel for the National Front for the Liberation of South Vietnam and the People's Army of Vietnam, ran not only through the Democratic Republic of Vietnam and the Republic of Vietnam, but also through the neighbouring countries of Laos and Cambodia. Via the Military Assistance Command, Vietnam Studies and Observations Group, the US military aimed to work outside of Vietnam and General Westmoreland's jurisdiction:

to execute an intensified program of harassment, diversion, political pressure, capture of prisoners, physical destruction, acquisition of intelligence, generation of propaganda, and diversion of resources, against the Democratic Republic of Vietnam.

On 21 September 1965 the JCS authorized MACV-SOG to begin cross-border operations within Laos in areas contiguous to the South Vietnam's western border.

Typically the 20th SOS carried unconventional forces across the border for secret missions into North Vietnam, Laos and Cambodia, such as the special operations group inserted by CH-3C/E helicopter across the Vietnamese border on June 30, 1968. Most of these SOG recon teams were made up of personnel indigenous to the population, reducing American combat casualties.

== Operations ==
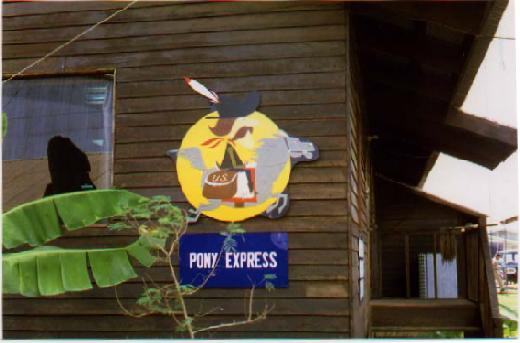
Symbol of the Pony Express at the 20th HES, Udorn RTAFB, Thailand

The 20th Helicopter Squadron "Pony Express" was one of the most decorated combat units in Southeast Asia. The Pony Express' primary highly classified mission was counterinsurgency. They flew their unarmed helicopters from Thailand to various friendly airstrips in Laos where they could refuel and await to launch their missions. They would fly indigenous troops into unprepared sites in Laos and North Vietnam to gather intelligence on troop/truck movements, etc. This information would in turn be forwarded to the appropriate Military agencies to select targets for air strike missions.

The unit aircraft were basic CH-3C Sikorsky helicopters models. No armor was deemed necessary at this time since the mission was to be clandestine and the power/weight ratio was considered more important. Even then, with the equipped engines, power was sometimes very marginal. In early 1968, the engines were upgraded from the 1300 hp model to the 1500 hp models which was a vast improvement in the high temperature/humidity environment. With the upgrading of the engines, armor was installed on the engine cowling doors, the transmission doors, and around the tail rotor gearbox. Designation was changed from CH-3C to CH-3E.

Due to the classified nature of their mission, the 20th CH-3's did not display any U.S. markings or insignia. They were equipped with slotted hangers to insert the USAF insignia when flying "in country". The pilots had no insignia on their flight suits. The helicopters were painted the standard camouflage pattern, except one. CH-3C #63-09676 was painted flat black to determine the color feasibility for our mission. It soon was given the nickname of "Black Mariah". (It was the only black H-3 to serve in SEA and is now on display at the USAF Museum at Wright-Patterson AFB, Dayton, Ohio.)

The infil/exfil site would be selected and studied. Previous to the flight an airborne "recon" of the site would be made, often using CAS Beech Baron or Air America Pilatus Porter aircraft. Since the Air America aircraft were constantly flying over the country, they would hardly be noticed. The mission tactics would usually include two helicopters. One would be the "high bird" and would orbit at a discreet distance to distract the enemy and to act as a rescue aircraft if needed. The "low bird" would fly in at low altitude to the selected site to offload the troops. This was usually accomplished at dusk to give the ground troops a chance to disperse if enemy forces were encountered. If any enemy ground fire was encountered on the "infil" approach, the mission would be aborted and the troops not put at undue risk.

As previously stated, the helicopters were not equipped with armor. The crew would wear the "flak vest" and place another flack vest under the pilot seats to provide personal protection. Their only weapons were the crew member's personal weapons, an M-16 rifle and a .38 caliber revolver. The infil portion of the mission required secrecy and not a firefight. The "exfil" though might be another matter. Sometimes the ground troops would encounter enemy forces and would require extraction while under enemy fire. The "Ponies" depended on "top cover" usually supplied by A-1 Skyraider attack aircraft, call sign depended on where they were stationed and could be "Sandy", Hobo" or "Firefly", to provide close air support with their guns and bombs, if needed. In the early days at Udorn, the Ponies were sometimes accompanied by World War II twin engine B-26 Invader aircraft callsign "Nimrod".

The Pony Express other mission was in support of TACAN navigational sites in Laos. These sites were important in guiding fighter and bomber aircraft on strike missions into North Vietnam. The helicopters would deliver personnel and needed supplies, such as power generators and diesel fuel, to the remotely located sites. One of the most important of these sites was at Lima Site 85 on top of a 5800' karst mountain, 19 km south of the Laotian/North Vietnam border and 125 miles southwest of Hanoi. LS85 also was supplied with super secret equipment used to direct strike missions around Hanoi.

In the spring of 1968, some pilots and CH3s of the 20th HES were transferred to Nakhon Phanom RTAFB (NKP) to form the 21st Helicopter Squadron.

In July 1968, four UH-1F's and 10 pilots from the 20th Helicopter Squadron, "E" Flight, "Green Hornets," arrived from Nha Trang. The "new" Pony Express Hueys flew virtually all the same missions as the H-3's. There were a few of the H-3 missions in Northern Laos that the Hueys were not involved in due to the extreme distance and limited range of the UH-1. On occasion, the Huey would carry a 55-gallon barrel of fuel in the cabin. If the Huey required the extra fuel, the crew chief would hook up his safety strap, step out onto the chopper's skid and hold the refueling hose as the other crewman pumped the fuel into the Huey's fuel tank. This was done at cruising altitude.

In August 1968 the 20th Helicopter Squadron was redesignated the 20th Special Operations Squadron (SOS). The Pony Express continued to fly many missions in support of DOSA (Director of Operations for Special Activities) through 1968 and into 1969. The Ponies flew 75% of their flying time as combat time and over 75% of their time flying their primary DOSA missions. The Pony Express always had two large and important missions, TACAN support and DOSA missions fragged by 7/13th AF in support of the secret war in Laos. The Ponies did not have sufficient helicopters and pilots to accomplish every mission adequately. Some of their large missions required the use of up to 20 CH-3E helicopters and they only had nine CH-3's and four UH-1's assigned. On many occasions the Pony Express called upon the 21st SOS at NKP to help with these large missions. Many times they were assisted by helicopters from Air America.

As early as June 1968, higher Headquarters began talk of merging the 20th and 21st began which would allow them to work more closely together and utilize the 21st flying time more for combat missions. The Pony Express would remain at Udorn as a Forward Operating Location (FOL) with basically the same people, aircraft and mission. Little did anyone know of the problems to follow. Apparently the ego and petty jealousy of the Wing Commander at NKP who insisted that all assets be transferred to NKP created a severe demoralizing effect on all concerned. The Ponies crews still accomplished their mission in an excellent manner despite the difficulties.

On 5 Sep 1969, the 20th SOS CH-3E aircraft and personnel at Udorn were reassigned to the 21st SOS at NKP. The FOL at Udorn lost three helicopters to NKP and many pilot spaces which amounted to one third of its capability, yet the FOL still flew 63% of the DOSA missions and 60% of the TACAN and an amazing 53.8% of the overall mission of the entire newly formed 21st SOS headquartered at NKP with the FOL stationed at Udorn RTAFB, Thailand.

When the 20th SOS CH-3 E's were transferred to the 21st SOS, without ceremony or fanfare, the "Pony Express" part of the 20th Special Operations Squadron ceased to exist.

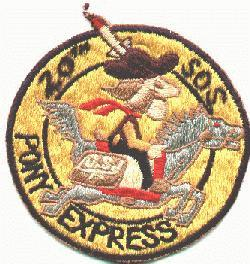
Emblem of the 20th SOS, the Pony Express

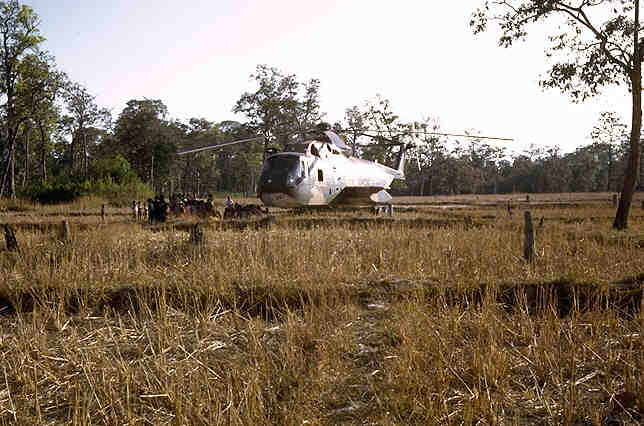
A USAF CH-3E downed in a rice paddy after having taken off with too many members of a Thai Artillery team on board, June 1969.
