= Special Operations Regiment (Thailand) =

Special operations force of the Royal Thai Air force

- กรมปฏิบัติการพิเศษ หน่วยบัญชาการอากาศโยธิน
- Unit insignia
- Active: Special Operations Regiment (1996–present); Special Operations Group (1985–96); Special Operations Officers (October 1977 – December 1977); Special Operations Company (1976–October 1977, 1977–85); Late 1975–present
- Country: Thailand
- Allegiance: HM The King of Thailand
- Branch: Royal Thai Air Force
- Type: Special forces
- Size: Regiment
- Part of: Royal Thai Air Force Security Force Regiment; Counter Terrorist Operations Center Royal Thai Armed Forces Headquarters
- Garrison/HQ: Don Muang Air Base, Bangkok
- Nickname: COMMANDO
- Engagements: Cold War; Communist insurgency in Thailand; Communist insurgency in Malaysia; Vietnamese border raids in Thailand; Thai–Laotian Border War; The Hijacking of Garuda Flight GA 206 (Woyla Operation) 1981; Southern Insurgency; 2003 Phnom Penh riots; Operation Pochentong; Cambodian–Thai border dispute; 2025 Cambodian–Thai border crisis
- Website: https://sor.rtaf.mi.th/index.php/page-main(in Thai)

Commanders
- Current commander: Gp.Capt. Wuttikorn Suwaree

The Royal Thai Air Force Special Operations Regiment or Air Force Commando (Thai: กรมปฏิบัติการพิเศษ หน่วยบัญชาการอากาศโยธิน) is a special forces unit of the Royal Thai Air Force Security Force Regiment's Special Combat Operations Squadron, which has been in existence since late 1975. Part of Royal Thai Air Force, they are based near Don Mueang International Airport and provide anti-hijacking capabilities, combat search and rescue, commando style raids, executive protection, forward air control, hostage rescue, irregular warfare, medical evacuation, providing security at air base or international airport, special operations mission, and tactical emergency medical services.

== History ==
In 1975, Thailand was under threat from communism. In the battle area operated by the three armies, faced with various forms of resistance from the communist insurgency forces. In this regard, The Royal Thai Air Force (RTAF) was aware of a plane being shot down in a combat area or behind enemy lines. If the plane is shot down and the pilot escapes, it must be surrounded by the enemy. Therefore, during the overlap between 1975-1976, the RTAF established a search and rescue unit, also known as the Pararescue Jumpers (PJs) to perform a mission of attack, search and rescue pilots who have been in combat operations in the battlefield and fell back out of the dangerous area can give those who will be in the PJs unit are only open to personnel affiliated with The Royal Thai Air Force Security Force Command (RTAF Security Force Command) and Directorate of Medical Services Royal Thai Air Force (DMS RTAF). These personnel will be stationed in 2 units were Air Return Center and Search and Rescue Helicopter Squadron. Initially there were only 17 Pararescuemen Jumpers (PJs), and five years later, the First Search and Rescue Officer Course was launched on 19 November 1981, if upon successful completion of the training course, they will be placed in the contain the 201st Helicopter Squadron and 203rd Helicopter Squadron, which is a unit under the Wing 2 located in Lopburi Province.

Meanwhile, in 1976, three Philippine Airlines (PAL) planes were seized by the Moro National Liberation Front (MNLF) forced the captain of the plane to came and stopped in Thailand to transfer to Libya. Three terrorists used 70 passengers as hostages and demanded the Philippine government paid a ransom of $300,000 and released four political prisoners. Philippine Airlines paid the terrorist ransom in cash. The terrorists released 12 hostages, the rest flew to Libya. When the plane made it to Libya, Colonel Muammar Gaddafi stepped in to defuse the situation by negotiating with the terrorists to release the hostages. In the end, the terrorists released the hostages, and Col. Gaddafi coordinated the return of hostages and ransom money to the Philippine Airlines. However, this hijacking incident made the RTAF realize that a special operation unit was needed to solve the situation. To prevent a similar situation in the future, a year later, in 1977, a commando unit was established by giving up directly to the 2nd RTAF Military Police Battalion, Office of Donmuang RTAF Base Commander (ODRTAFBC), and opened the first Commando training course for 17 personnels from the PJ on December 30 of the same year.

In 1985, Commando was established as a Special Operations Company (SOC) under the Special Operations Group (SOG) under the RTAF Security Force Command. In early 1988 a heliborne detachment rescued a Thai fighter pilot shot down along the border during hostilities with Laos. During April–May 1988, 43 members from the unit held Badge Tram 88 field exercises in Thailand with a United States Air Force Combat Control Team.

In 1991, the PJs unit was established as a Search and Rescue Company (SARC) under the Special Operations Group. After that, the SOG was upgraded to become a Special Operations Regiment (SOR). In 1996, due to personnel shortage during its transition to the SOR, high-ranking officials involved with the SOR combined Search and Rescue, and Commando together. In 2005 the establishment of a Special Operations Course was approved, and since then, the SOC has been promoted to a Special Operations Battalion (SOB).

== Organization ==
=== RTAF: Special Operation Regiment Command. ===
- RTAF: Command Center
  - RTAF: 1st Special Operation Battalion. ( Combat Control Team )
    - RTAF: Service Support Company.
      - RTAF: Combat Signal Platoon.
      - RTAF: Ordnance Platoon.
      - RTAF: Transportation Platoon.
    - RTAF: 1st Special Operations Company. ( Commando )
      - RTAF: 1st Special Operations Unit.
      - RTAF: 2nd Special Operations Unit.
      - RTAF: 3rd Special Operations Unit.
    - RTAF: 2nd Special Operations Company. ( Commando )
      - RTAF: 1st Special Operations Unit.
      - RTAF: 2nd Special Operations Unit.
      - RTAF: 3rd Special Operations Unit.
    - RTAF: 3rd Special Operations Company. ( Commando )
      - RTAF: 1st Special Operations Unit.
      - RTAF: 2nd Special Operations Unit.
      - RTAF: 3rd Special Operations Unit.
  - RTAF: 2nd Special Operation Battalion. ( Pararescue Jumper )
    - RTAF: Service Support Company.
      - RTAF: Combat Signal Platoon.
      - RTAF: Ordnance Platoon.
      - RTAF: Transportation Platoon.
      - RTAF: Quartermaster Platoon.
    - RTAF: 1st Special Operations Company .
      - RTAF: 1st Special Operations Unit.
      - RTAF: 2nd Special Operations Unit.
      - RTAF: 3rd Special Operations Unit.
      - RTAF: 4th Special Operations Unit.
    - RTAF: 2nd Special Operations Company.
      - RTAF: 1st Special Operations Unit.
      - RTAF: 2nd Special Operations Unit.
      - RTAF: 3rd Special Operations Unit.
    - RTAF: 3rd Special Operations Company.
      - RTAF: 1st Special Operations Unit.
      - RTAF: 2nd Special Operations Unit.
      - RTAF: 3rd Special Operations Unit.
  - RTAF: 3rd Special Operation Battalion. ( Freefall )
    - RTAF: Service Support Company.
      - RTAF: Combat Signal Platoon.
      - RTAF: Ordnance Platoon.
      - RTAF: Transportation Platoon.
    - RTAF: 1st Special Operations Company.
      - RTAF: 1st Special Operations Unit.
      - RTAF: 2nd Special Operations Unit.
      - RTAF: 3rd Special Operations Unit.
    - RTAF: 2nd Special Operations Company.
      - RTAF: 1st Special Operations Unit.
      - RTAF: 2nd Special Operations Unit.
      - RTAF: 3rd Special Operations Unit.
    - RTAF: 3rd Special Operations Company.
      - RTAF: 1st Special Operations Unit.
      - RTAF: 2nd Special Operations Unit.
      - RTAF: 3rd Special Operations Unit.
- RTAF: Aerial Support Company.
- RTAF: Combat Search and Rescue Center (CSAR). ( Pararescuemen )

== Land vehicles ==
| Model | Origin | Type | Quantity | Notes |
|---|---|---|---|---|
| Cadillac Gage Commando | United States | Armored car | 12 | With 12.7mm and 7.62mm MG |
| Condor | Germany | Armored car | 18 | With 20mm and 7.62mm MG |
