= List of cathedrals in Laos =

This is the list of cathedrals in Laos sorted by denomination.

== Roman Catholic ==
Cathedrals of the Roman Catholic Church in Laos:

- Sacred Heart Cathedral, Vientiane
- Co-Cathedral of St. Therese, Savannakhet
- Cathedral of the Sacred Heart in Pakse
- Cathedral of St. Louis in Thakhek

== See also ==
- List of cathedrals
- Christianity in Laos
