= Catholic Church in Laos =

- Lao: ໂບດກາໂຕລິກໃນລາວ
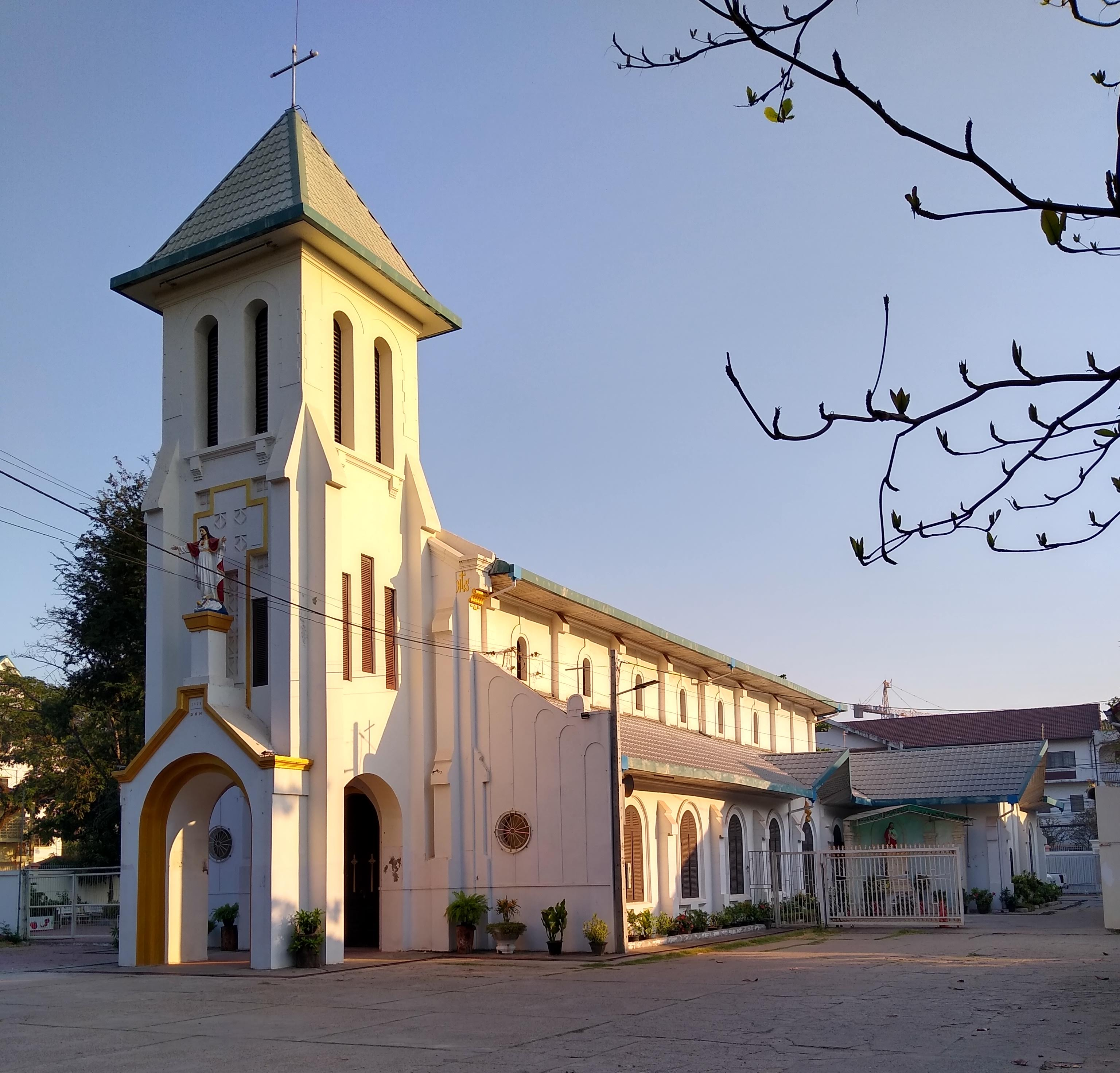
- Sacred Heart Cathedral, Vientiane
- Classification: Catholic
- Orientation: Asian Christianity, Latin
- Scripture: Bible
- Theology: Catholic theology
- Governance: CELAC
- Pope: Leo XIV
- Apostolic Delegate: Peter Bryan Wells
- President of CELAC: Enrique Figaredo Alvargonzalez
- Region: Laos
- Language: Lao, Latin
- Headquarters: Sacred Heart Cathedral, Vientiane
- Separations: Protestantism in Laos
- Members: 45,015 (0.57%)

The Catholic Church in Laos is part of the worldwide Catholic Church, under the spiritual leadership of the pope in Rome. The Catholic Church is officially recognized by the government.

== Hierarchy ==
There are no dioceses in the country. Rather, Laos is divided into four Apostolic Vicariates, which are pre-diocesan jurisdictions that are entitled to a titular bishop and are exempt, i.e., directly subject to the Holy See and its missionary Congregation for the Evangelization of Peoples. The four vicariates are:

- Vicariate Apostolic of Luang Prabang
- Vicariate Apostolic of Paksé
- Vicariate Apostolic of Savannakhet
- Vicariate Apostolic of Vientiane

Each vicariate is headed by an apostolic vicar, who thereby is a member of the common episcopal conference of Laos and (Indochinese neighbour) Cambodia.

The Holy See has an Apostolic Delegation (papal diplomatic legation of lower rank than an embassy) to Laos. The delegation, however, is based in Bangkok, the capital of neighbouring Thailand. The papal legation to Laos is vested in the Apostolic nuncio to Thailand (as are also the papal legations to Cambodia and Myanmar).

== History ==
On 4 May 1899, the Apostolic Vicariate of Laos was established on territory split off from the Apostolic Vicariate of Eastern Siam; it would be renamed on 21 December 1950 as Apostolic Vicariate of Thare, after its new see in Thailand, to become the present (Thai) Metropolitan Archdiocese of Thare and Nonseng.

The Apostolic Vicariate of Laos lost territories in two splits :

- on 14 June 1938 the Apostolic Prefecture of Vientiane and Luang-Prabang was split off, which on 13 March 1952 was promoted as Apostolic Vicariate of Vientiane
- on 21 December Apostolic Prefecture of Thakhek was split off, which on 24 February 1958 was promoted as Apostolic Vicariate of Thakhek, which on 26 November 1963 was renamed as Apostolic Vicariate of Savannakhet

On 1 March 1963, the Apostolic Vicariate of Luang Prabang was in turn split off from the Apostolic Vicariate of Vientiane.

On 12 June 1967, the Apostolic Vicariate of Pakse was split off from the Apostolic Vicariate of Savannakhet).

In 2017, Louis-Marie Ling Mangkhanekhoun became the first ever Lao Cardinal.

== Description ==
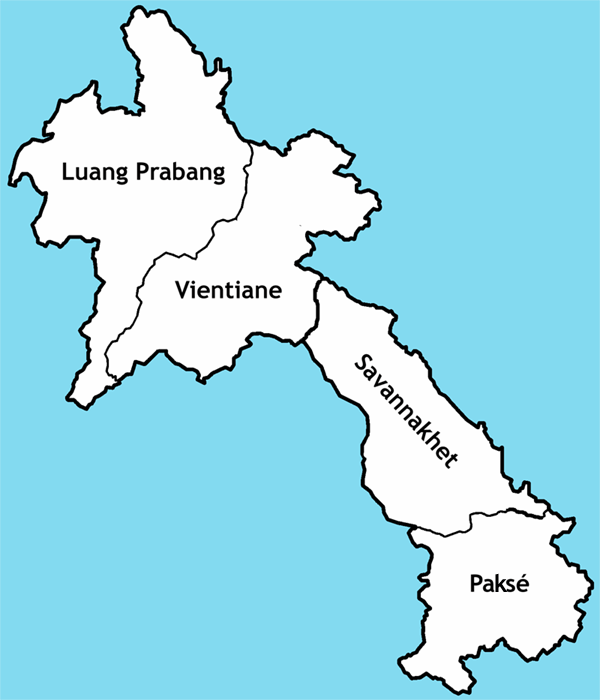
Map of Laotian apostolic vicariates.

In 2007 many Catholics were ethnic Vietnamese, concentrated in major urban centers and surrounding areas along the Mekong River in the central and southern regions of the country; the Catholic Church had an established presence in five of the most populous central and southern provinces, and Catholics are able to worship openly.

The Catholic Church's activities were more circumscribed in the north, where there were four bishops, two located in Vientiane and others located in the cities of Thakhek and Pakse. One of the two bishops resident in Vientiane oversaw the Vientiane Diocese and was responsible for the central part of the country while the second bishop resident in Vientiane was the Bishop of Luang Prabang - he was assigned to the northern part of the country, but while the Government did not permit him to take up his post, it did permit him to travel to visit church congregations in the north.

Relationship between the Church and government has been strained since 1950s, a time when the Church was openly opposed to Pathet Lao. The relationship after 1975 is categorised as mutually suspicious within each other. The church's property in Luang Prabang was seized after the 1975 Communist takeover, and there is no longer a parsonage in that city. In 2007 an informal Catholic training center in Thakhek prepared a small number of priests to serve the Catholic community while several foreign nuns temporarily serve in the Vientiane diocese.

== 2020s ==
There are 100,000 Catholics in Laos in 2022, rising from 50,000 - 60,000 Laotian Catholics in 2015.

Reports stated that 47 priests and 107 nuns served 180 parishes.

== See also ==
- Religion in Laos
- Christianity in Laos
- List of Saints from Asia
- List of Catholic dioceses (structured view) § Episcopal Conference of Laos and Cambodia
- Jean Khamsé Vithavong

== Bibliography ==
- Bailey, Stephen; Hien, Vu (28 December 2021), "Two Steps Forward, One Step Back: Progress for covenantal pluralism in Laos and Vietnam", in Seiple, Chris; Hoover, Dennis R. (eds.), The Routledge Handbook of Religious Literacy, Pluralism, and Global Engagement, London: Routledge, pp. 295–308, doi:10.4324/9781003036555, ISBN 9781003036555
- Morev, Lev (1998), "Religion, state, and society in contemporary Laos", Religions, State, and Society, 26 (1): 31–38, doi:10.1080/09637499808431803

== External links and sources ==
- GCatholic (and further links)
