= Thomas Khamphan =

Laotian Roman Catholic prelate (1925–2001)

His Excellency Thomas Khamphan
- Vicar Apostolic of Pakse
- Installed: 10 July 1975
- Term ended: 30 October 2000
- Predecessor: Jean-Pierre Urkia, M.E.P.
- Successor: Louis-Marie Ling Mangkhanekhoun

Orders
- Ordination: 19 October 1955
- Consecration: 10 August 1975 by Thomas Nantha

Personal details
- Born: 6 October 1925 Champasak province
- Died: 26 July 2001 (aged 75)

Thomas Khamphan (6 October 1925 – 26 July 2001) was a Laotian Roman Catholic prelate. He was titular bishop of Semina from 1975 until his death and vicar apostolic of Pakse from 1975 to 2000 when he retired. He died on 26 July 2001 at the age of 75.

Catholic Church titles
Preceded by Jean-Pierre Urkia, M.E.P.	Vicar Apostolic of Pakse; 1975–2000	Succeeded by Louis-Marie Ling Mangkhanekhoun
Preceded by Pierluigi Sartorelli	Titular Bishop of Semina; 1975–2001	Succeeded by Timothy Anthony McDonnell
