= Martyrs of Laos =

20th-century Catholic martyr

Blessed Martyrs of Laos
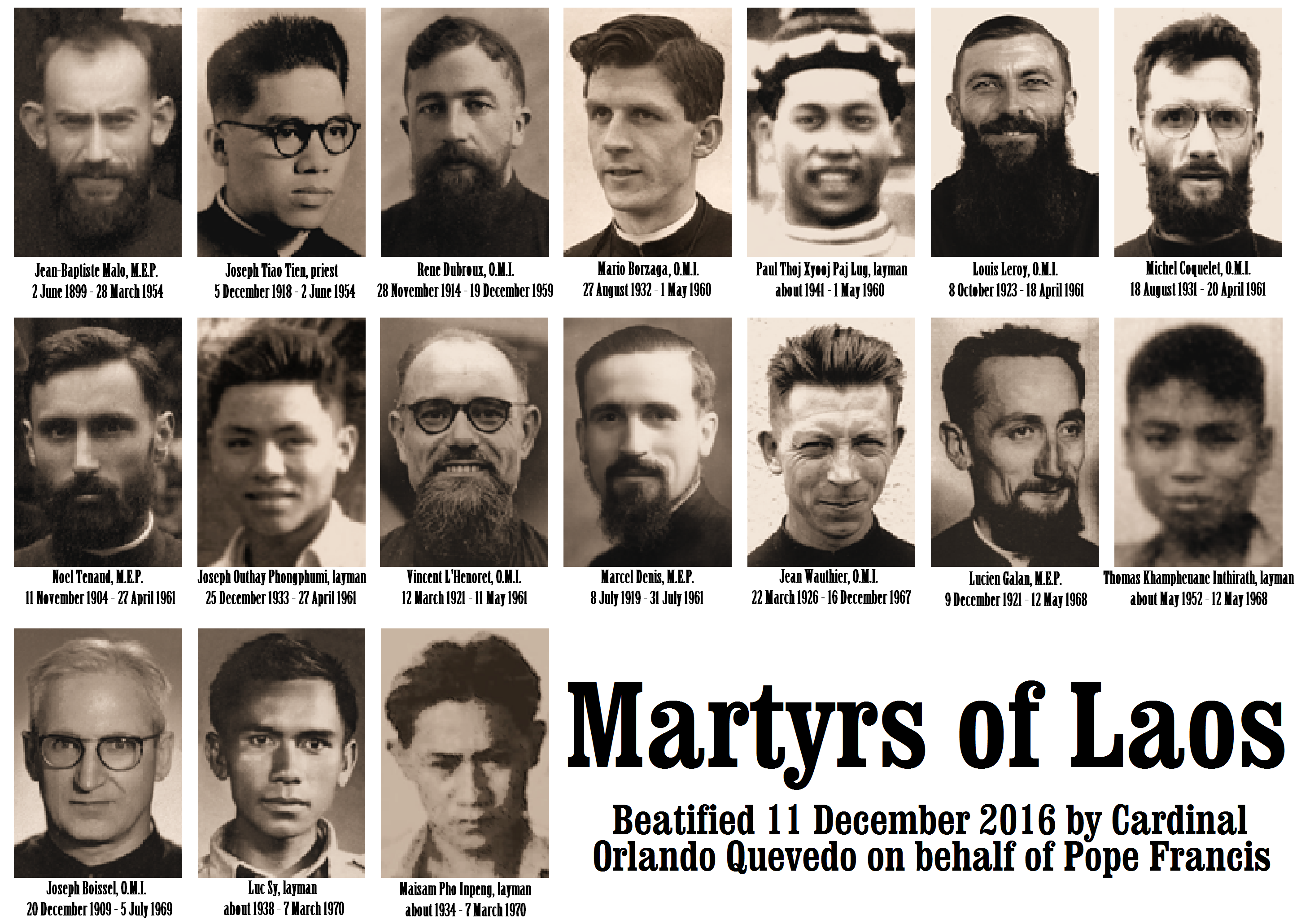
- Born: Within Italy, France and Laos
- Died: 28 March 1954 (Blessed Jean-Baptiste Malo) – 7 March 1970 (Blesseds Luc Sy and Maisam Pho Inpeng); Laos
- Venerated in: Catholic Church
- Beatified: 11 December 2016, Vientiene, Laos by Cardinal Orlando Quevedo
- Feast: 16 December, various dates for individual martyrs
- Attributes: martyr's palm
- Patronage: Laos

The Martyrs of Laos are seventeen Catholic priests and professed religious as well as one lay young man venerated as martyrs killed in Laos between 1954 and 1970 of the First and Second Indochina Wars during a period of anti-religious sentiment under the Pathet Lao Theravada Buddhist-communist political movement.

The cause for their canonization was opened as two parallel processes with one for Mario Borzaga – an Italian Missionary Oblate of Mary Immaculate – and his companion Paul Thoj Xyooj – a Laotian catechist – and another for a group of fifteen martyrs that included ten French missionaries as well as five Laotian Catholics. The Borzaga cause commenced under Pope Benedict XVI on 22 December 2006 and the Tiěn cause commenced on 18 January 2008 in a move that accorded both sets of martyrs the title of Servant of God. Pope Francis approved both beatifications in 2015 and their beatification took place in Vientiane Cathedral on 11 December 2016 in which Cardinal Orlando Quevedo presided on the pope's behalf.

== Life ==
=== Mario Borzaga and Thoj Xyooj Paj Lug ===
==== Borzaga ====
Mario Borzaga was born on 27 August 1932 in Trent as the third of four children. He was ordained to the priesthood on 24 February 1957 (he entered the seminary in 1943) and became a professed member of the Missionary Oblates of Mary Immaculate in 1952. Borzaga decided to join the missions in Laos that his order was overseeing and so left Naples with the first Italian team to Laos where he learnt about the language and the local culture in order to assimilate into the communities. In 1958 he operated in small villages before moving into the northern regions around the apostolic vicariate of Luang Prabang where he began teaching catechism and later met the layman Thoj Xyooj Paj Lug.

On 25 April 1960 he and Lug – at the request of some of the villagers of Pha Xoua – began a three-day walk near the border of China and along the path lost their tracks but were later ambushed and killed by guerillas of the Pathet Lao. He was killed on 25 April 1960 in the town of Kiukatiam in Luang Prabang in Laos. It was said that Borzaga was allowed to go because he was a foreign priest but he responded to his attackers: "If you kill him, you kill me. If he dies, I will die". His remains were thrown into a pit with his companion and never identified with precision.

He wrote a diary of his experiences and was later published as "To Be a Happy Man".

==== Lug ====
Thoj Xyooj Paj Lug, a Hmong, was born in 1941 in Kiukatiam and was a catechist from the apostolic vicariate of Luang Prabang. He was killed on 25 April 1960 in his hometown and his remains crudely thrown into a pit alongside his priestly companion.

=== Joseph Thąo Tiěn and 14 companions ===
The fifteen martyrs are a group of French priests and religious from the Society of Foreign Missions of Paris and the Missionary Oblates of Mary Immaculate; there were also four lay Laotian catechists in this group and all were killed between 1954 and 1970 under the communist movement known as Pathet Lao.

During the Easter season of 1953, guerillas stormed Sam Neua and many missionaries retreated in order to remain safe while Joseph Thąo Tiěn remained behind – ordained in 1949 – and said: "I am staying for my people. I am ready to lay down my life for my Laotian brothers and sisters". He was then marched to the prison camp at Talang and told weeping people along the way: "Do not be sad, I'll come back. I am going to study ... Make sure that your village keeps improving". The priest was sentenced to death and killed a year later and refused to give up the priesthood and marry as his captors ordered him to do.

On the other side of Laos the priest John Baptist Malo – who served in China – was detained with four companions and died of exhaustion in 1954 en route to a prison camp. Other French priests and religious were killed and others died in captivity.

==== Martyrs ====
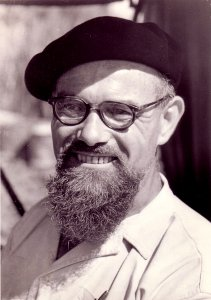
Fr. Vincent l'Hénoret O.M.I.

Below are the names of the fifteen martyrs:

- Jean-Baptiste Malo (2 June 1889 – 28 March 1954) – priest of the Society of Foreign Missions of Paris
- Joseph Thąo Tiěn (5 December 1918 – 2 June 1954) – priest
- René Dubroux (28 November 1914 – 19 December 1959) – priest of the Society of Foreign Missions of Paris
- Louis Leroy (8 October 1923 – 18 April 1961) – priest of the Missionary Oblates of Mary Immaculate
- Michel Coquelet (18 August 1931 – 20 April 1961) – priest of the Missionary Oblates of Mary Immaculate
- Vincent l'Hénoret (12 March 1921 – 11 May 1961) – priest of the Missionary Oblates of Mary Immaculate
- Noël Tenaud (11 November 1904 – 27 April 1961) – priest of the Society of Foreign Missions of Paris
- Joseph Outhay Phongphumi (1933 – 27 April 1961) – layman and catechist
- Marcel Denis (8 July 1919 – 31 July 1961) – priest of the Society of Foreign Missions of Paris
- Jean Wauthier (22 March 1926 – 16 December 1967) – priest of the Missionary Oblates of Mary Immaculate
- Lucien Galan (9 December 1921 – 12 May 1968) – priest of the Society of Foreign Missions of Paris
- Thomas Khampheuane Inthirath (May 1952 – 12 May 1968) – layman
- Joseph Boissel (20 December 1909 – 5 July 1969) – priest of the Missionary Oblates of Mary Immaculate
- Luc Sy (1938 – 7 March 1970) – layman and catechist, cousin of Cardinal Louis-Marie Ling Mangkhanekhoun of the Apostolic Vicariate of Pakse
- Maisam Pho Inpèng (1934 – 7 March 1970) – married layman

== Beatification ==
The beatification process for Borzaga and Lug commenced in Trent after the forum for the process was transferred from Luang Prabang on 30 September 2005 to Trent. The two were then titled as a Servant of God on 22 December 2006 under Pope Benedict XVI after the Congregation for the Causes of Saints issued the official nihil obstat and allowed the process to take place. The diocesan process spanned from 7 October 2006 to 17 October 2008 and the C.C.S. later validated the process on 19 June 2009 in a move that allowed for the postulation to send the Positio to the C.C.S. in 2014. Theologians approved the cause on 27 November 2014 while the C.C.S. also voted in approval on 5 May 2015. Pope Francis approved the beatification that very same day and confirmed the two were martyrs.

The second cause commenced in Nantes and the transfer of the forum came from Savannakhet and other Laotian cities on 6 September 2007. The official "nihil obstat" came on 18 January 2008 and allowed for the inauguration of the diocesan process which started on 10 June 2008 and concluded its business on 28 February 2010; the cause was validated on 15 October 2011. The postulation sent the Positio to the C.C.S. in 2014 and theologians voiced their approval to the cause on 27 November 2014 while the C.C.S. also voted in favor on 2 June 2015. Pope Francis confirmed the group were martyrs on 5 June 2015 and approved their beatification.

The beatification was celebrated in Vientiane Cathedral on 11 December 2016 in which Cardinal Orlando Quevedo presided on the pope's behalf.

The current postulator for both these causes is Thomas Kosterkamp.
