= Staccioli =

Staccioli is an Italian surname. Notable people with the surname include:

- Alessandro Staccioli (1931–2026), Italian Roman Catholic bishop
- Giulia Staccioli (born 1964), Italian rhythmic gymnast
- Ivano Staccioli (1927–1995), Italian actor
- Mauro Staccioli (1937–2018), Italian sculptor
