= Christianity in Laos =

Christianity is a minority religion in Laos.

In 2015, Christians in Laos numbered 200,000 to 210,000, with 50,000–60,000 thousand for Catholics and 150,000 for Protestants, based on rough estimates conducted by LFND. In 2021, estimates showed that there were 100,000 Catholics, 200,000 evangelicals, 4,700 Methodists and 2,500 Seventh-day Adventists.

There are three recognised Churches in Laos: the Catholic Church, the Lao Evangelical Church, and the Seventh-day Adventist Church. The Laotian government repressed all activities of religion from 1975 to 1989. Religious practice resumed to be permitted after the Party held a congress and released two new doctrines called as chintanakan mai or new thinking and kanpianpeng mai or renovation. Laotian religious freedom began increasing in 2000s, when the government started opening the dialogue up with United Nations and numerous organisations.

== Catholicism ==
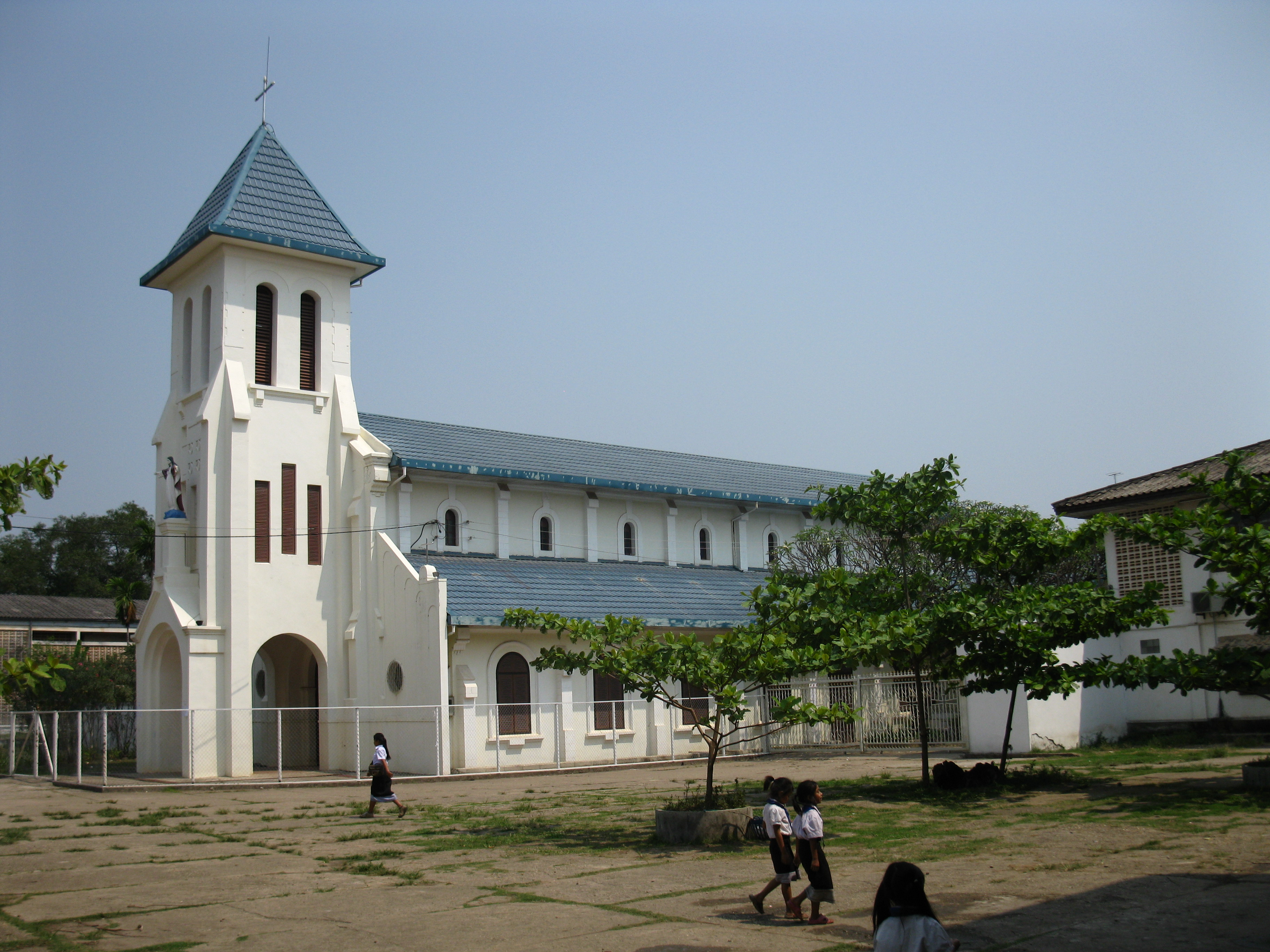
Sacred Heart Catholic Church (pro-cathedral, built 1928), Vientiane.

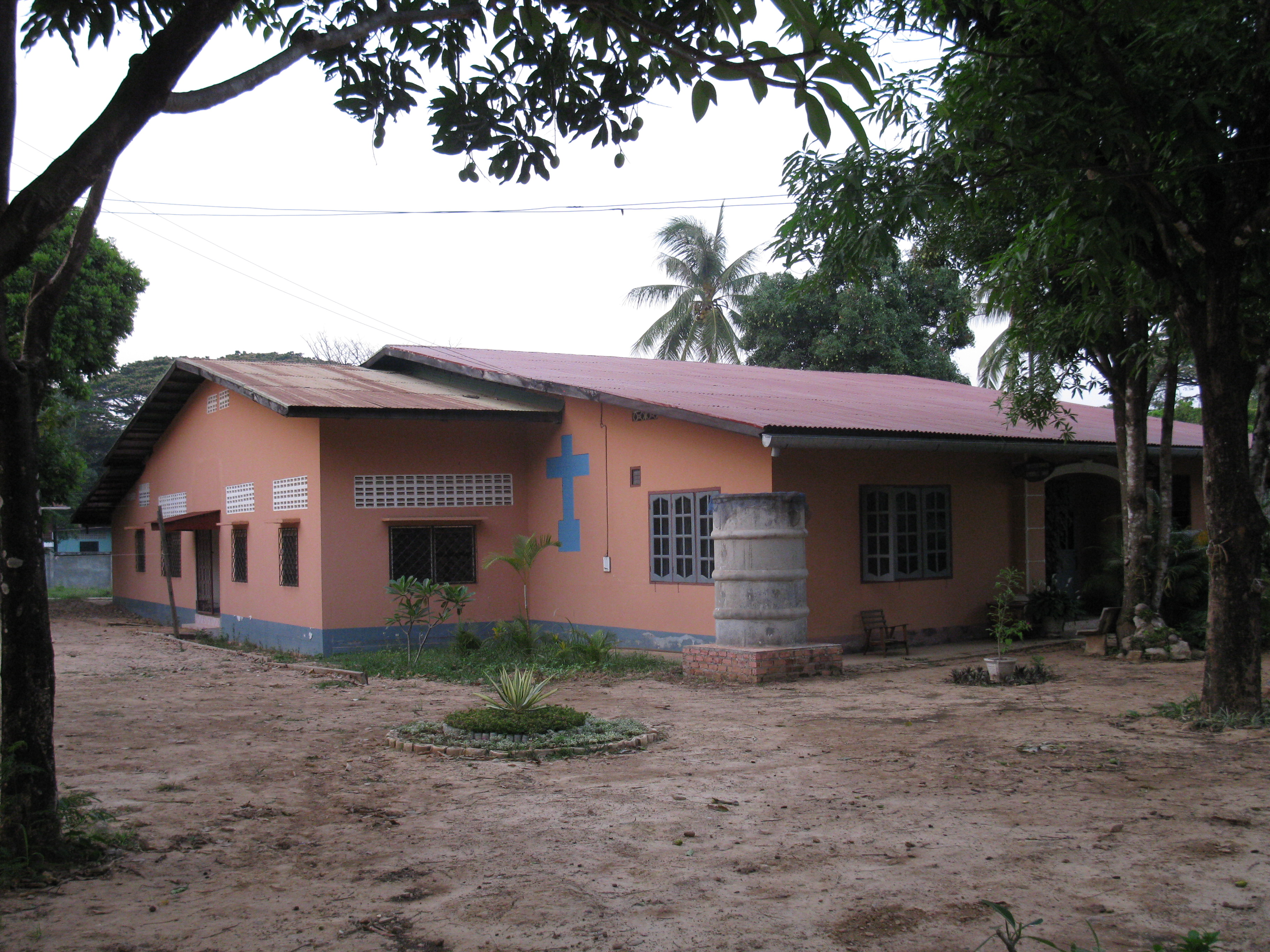
Catholic Training Center in Thakhek.

The Catholic Church is officially recognized by the government. In 2007 many Catholics were ethnic Vietnamese, concentrated in major urban centers and surrounding areas along the Mekong River in the central and southern regions of the country; the Catholic Church had an established presence in five of the most populous central and southern provinces, and Catholics are able to worship openly. Initially brought by Italian missionaries in seventeenth century but was left dormant for sometimes, Catholic missions entered Laos again when Laos was a French colony in late nineteenth century, especially after 1893 when French colonial government decided to protect Catholic missionaries across Laos.

There are 100,000 Catholics in Laos in 2022, rising from 50,000 - 60,000 Laotian Catholics in 2015.

In 2007 many Catholics were ethnic Vietnamese, concentrated in major urban centers and surrounding areas along the Mekong River in the central and southern regions of the country; the Catholic Church had an established presence in five of the most populous central and southern provinces, and Catholics are able to worship openly. The Catholic Church's activities were more circumscribed in the north, where there were four bishops - two located in Vientiane and others located in the cities of Thakhek and Pakse.

One of the two bishops resident in Vientiane oversaw the Vientiane Diocese and was responsible for the central part of the country, while the second bishop resident in Vientiane was the Bishop of Luang Prabang - he was assigned to the northern part of the country, but while the Government did not permit him to take up his post, it did permit him to travel to visit church congregations in the north. The church's property in Luang Prabang was seized after 1975, and there is no longer a parsonage in that city. An informal Catholic training center in Thakhek prepared a small number of priests to serve the Catholic community while several foreign nuns temporarily serve in the Vientiane diocese.

There are no dioceses in the country, but it is divided into four Apostolic vicariates: the Vicariate Apostolic of Luang Prabang, the Vicariate Apostolic of Paksé, the Vicariate Apostolic of Savannakhet, and the Vicariate Apostolic of Vientiane.

== Protestantism ==
Approximately 400 Protestant congregations conduct services throughout the country for a community that has grown rapidly in the past decade. Rough estimate Protestants to number as many as 150,000. Other estimates put the figures at over 200,000 in 2021.

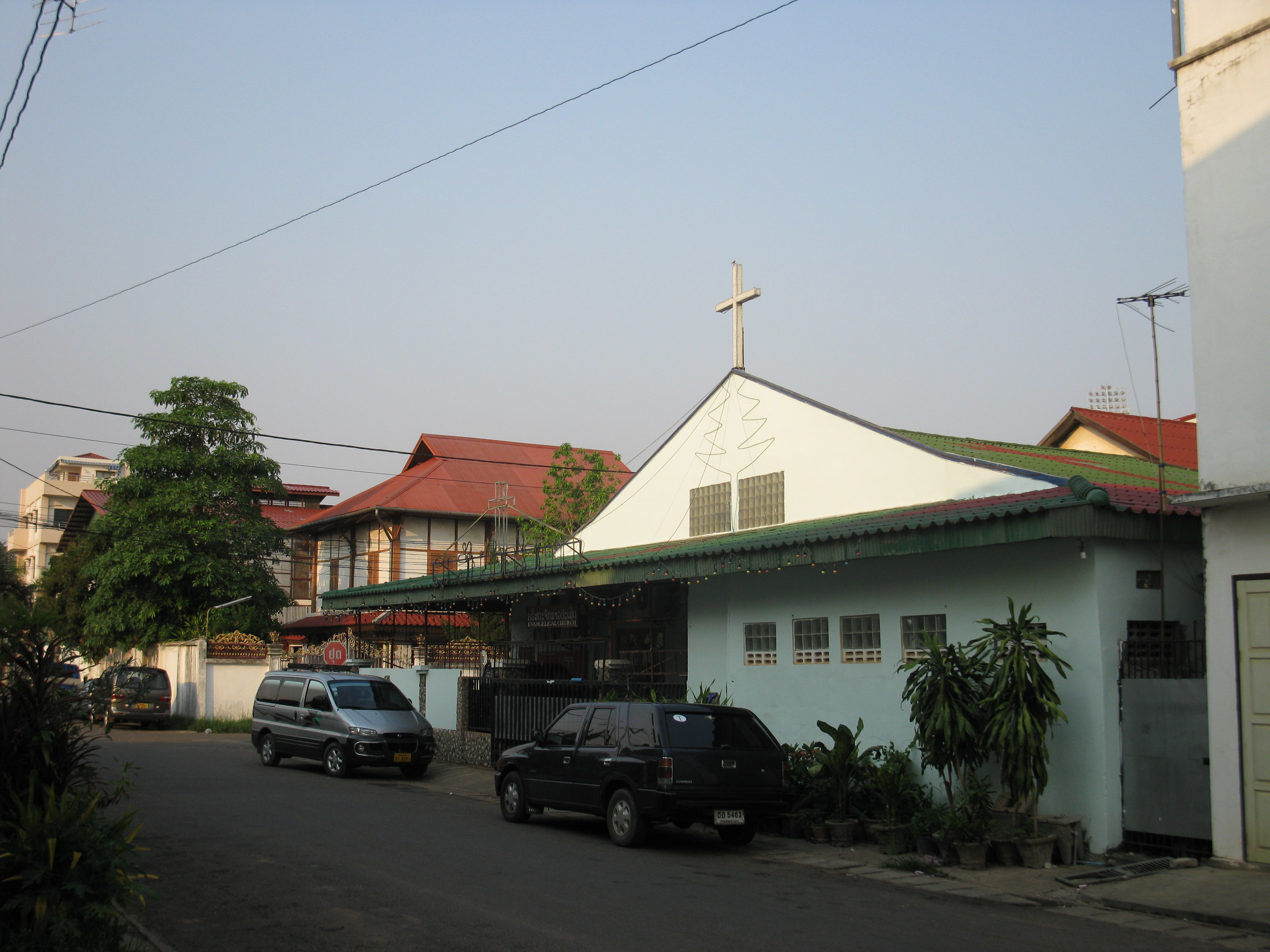
Protestant Church, Haiphong Road, Vientiane.

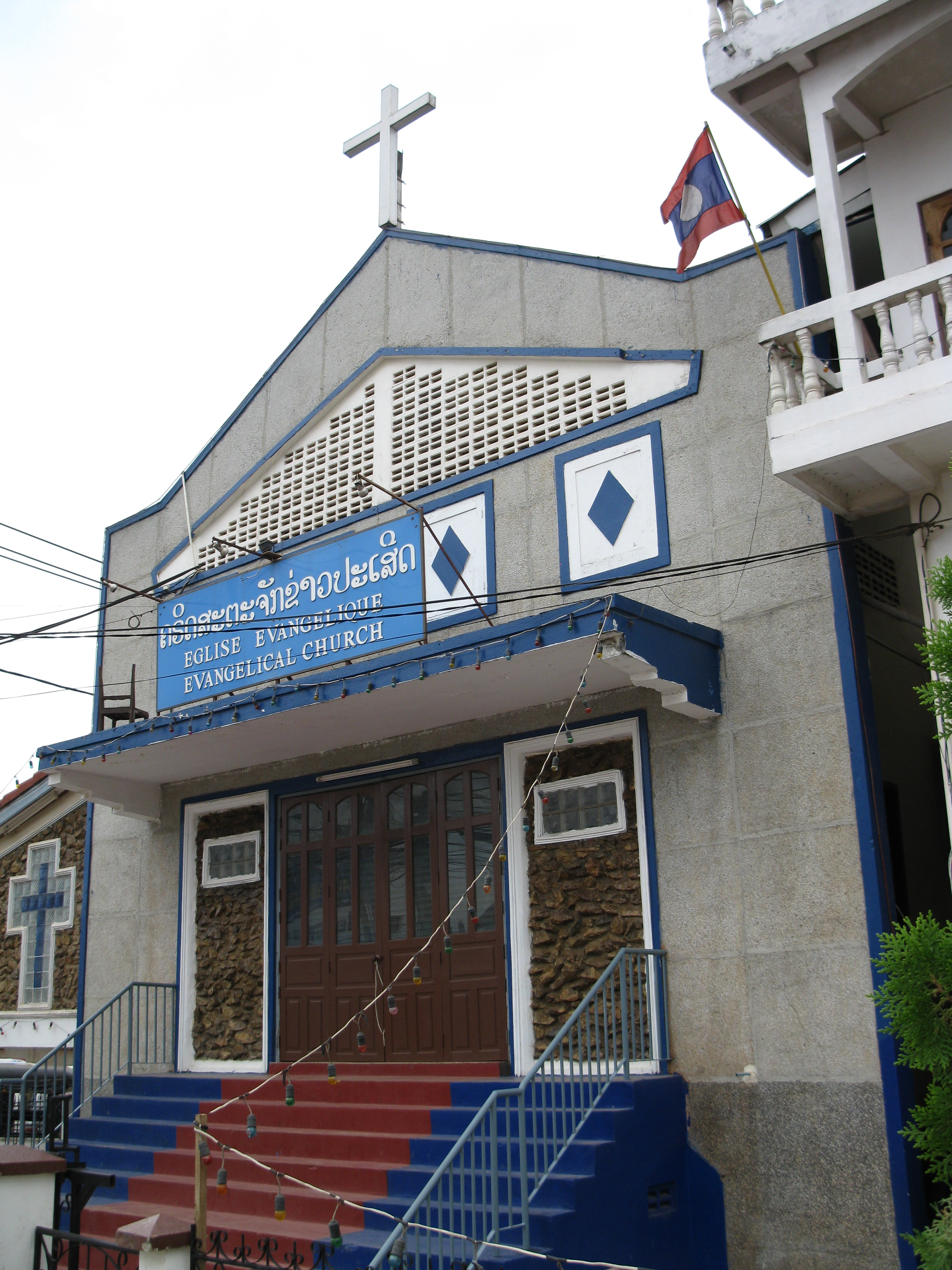
Protestant Church, Luang Prabang Road, Vientiane.

Many Protestants are members of ethnic Mon-Khmer groups, especially the Khmu in the north and the Brou in the central provinces. Numbers of Protestants have also expanded rapidly in the Hmong and Yao communities. In urban areas, Protestantism has many lowland Lao followers. Most Protestants are concentrated in Vientiane Municipality, in the provinces of Vientiane, Sainyabuli, Luang Prabang, Xiangkhouang, Bolikhamsai, Savannakhet, Champassak, and Attapeu, as well as in the former Xaisomboun Special Zone, but smaller congregations are located throughout the country.

The LFND officially recognizes only two Protestant groups – the LEC and the Seventh-day Adventist Church – and requires all non-Catholic Christian groups to operate under one of these organizations. In 2021, estimates showed that the LEC had 200,00 members; in the same year, Seventh-day Adventists numbered slightly more than 2,500 country-wide with congregations in Vientiane Municipality as well as Bokeo, Bolikhamsai, Champassak, Luang Prabang, and Xieng Khouang provinces. Members are mainly Chinese and Hmong. At the end of 30 June 2019 it had four churches.

Christian denominations that have some following in the country, but which are not recognized by the government, include the Methodists, Church of Christ, Assemblies of God, Lutherans, Baptists, Jehovah's Witnesses and the Church of Jesus Christ of Latter-day Saints. Official membership numbers are not available.

All approved Christian religious groups own properties in Vientiane Municipality, although some of their properties are not officially recognized by the Government. In addition, the Protestant LEC maintains properties in the cities of Savannakhet and Pakse. Three informal churches, one for English-speakers, one for Korean-speakers, and one for Chinese-speakers, serve Vientiane's foreign Protestant community.

In 2005, a Protestant church in Savannakhet Province was closed down by the government. Among the Hmong of Laos 20% were Christians in 1998. With around 300 congregations, Protestantism grew rapidly between 1995 and 2005.

=== Freedom of religion ===
According to the US government and other agencies there have been instances of the Laotian government attempting to make Christians renounce their faith, and have several times closed down Christian churches. They also say that there are two religious prisoners in Laos, both members of the Lao Evangelical Church, and that in 2005, a church in Savannakhet Province was closed down by the government.

In 2023, the country was scored 1 out of 4 for religious freedom; it was noted that the Lao People's Revolutionary Party controls clergy training and supervision of Buddhist temples. There have been several recent cases of Christians being briefly detained for unauthorized religious activities.

== See also ==
- Religion in Laos

== Bibliography ==
- Bailey, Stephen; Hien, Vu (28 December 2021), "Two Steps Forward, One Step Back: Progress for covenantal pluralism in Laos and Vietnam", in Seiple, Chris; Hoover, Dennis R. (eds.), The Routledge Handbook of Religious Literacy, Pluralism, and Global Engagement, London: Routledge, pp. 295–308, doi:10.4324/9781003036555, ISBN 9781003036555
- Morev, Lev (1998), "Religion, state, and society in contemporary Laos", Religions, State, and Society, 26 (1): 31–38, doi:10.1080/09637499808431803
- Morev, Lev (2002), "Religion in Laos Today", Religion, State and Society, 30 (4), Carfax Publishing: 395–407, doi:10.1080/09637490220127602
