= Apostolic Vicariate of Luang Prabang =

Catholic missionary jurisdiction in Laos

Apostolic Vicariate of Luang Prabang Vicariatus Apostolicus Luangensis Prabangensis ອັກຄະສາວົກແທນຂອງແຂວງຫລວງພະບາງ

Location
- Country: Laos
- Metropolitan: Immediately subject to the Holy See

Statistics
- Area: 83,700 km^{2} (32,300 sq mi)
- Population: Total; Catholics: (as of 2010); 1,467,154; 2,410 (0.2%)
- Parishes: 6

Information
- Denomination: Roman Catholic
- Rite: Latin Rite
- Established: 1 March 1963

Current leadership
- Pope: Leo XIV
- Apostolic Vicar: Sede Vacante
- Apostolic Administrator: Louis-Marie Ling Mangkhanekhoun
- Bishops emeritus: Tito Banchong Thopanhong

Map
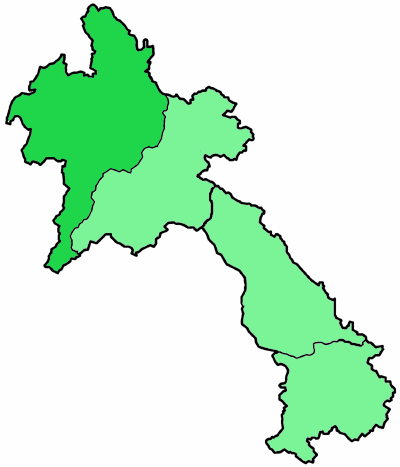

The Apostolic Vicariate of Luang Prabang (Latin: Vicariatus Apostolicus Luangensis Prabangensis) is a Latin Rite jurisdiction of the Catholic Church in Laos. As an apostolic vicariate, it is a pre-diocesan jurisdiction, entitled to a titular bishop. It is located in northern Laos.

It is exempt, i.e. not part of any ecclesiastical province but directly dependent on the Holy See and its missionary Dicastery for Evangelization.

It currently has no cathedral since its former Cathedral of the Immaculate Conception, in Luang Prabang, has been secularized. The vicariate has been vacant since 1975, entrusted to a series of temporary Apostolic administrators.

== Statistics ==
The vicariate covers 80,425 km² in the northern Laotian civic provinces of Luang Prabang, Xaignabouli, Oudomxai, Phongsali, Louang Namtha and Bokeo.

As of 2014, it pastorally cares for 2,693 Catholics (0.2% of 1,692,000 total) in 8 parishes with one priest and five seminarians.

== History ==
It was established on March 1, 1963 as Apostolic Vicariate of Luang Prabang with territory split off from the Vicariate Apostolic of Vientiane.

Since the Communist takeover of Laos in 1975 the Catholic Church in the vicariate of Luang Prabang has been strongly suppressed.

== Ordinaries ==
=== Apostolic Vicars of Luang Prabang ===
- Lionello Berti, O.M.I. (1963-1968)
- Alessandro Staccioli, O.M.I. (1968-1975), appointed Auxiliary Bishop of Siena–Colle di Val d’Elsa–Montalcino

=== Apostolic Administrators ===
- Thomas Nantha (1975-1984), concurrently Apostolic Vicar of Vientiane
- Jean Khamsé Vithavong O.M.I (1984-1999), concurrently Apostolic Vicar of Vientiane
- Father Tito Banchong Thopanhong (1999–2019)
- Cardinal Louis-Marie Ling Mangkhanekhoun (2019-2024)

== See also ==
- List of Catholic dioceses in Laos
