= Baháʼí Faith in Laos =

The Baháʼí Faith in Laos begins after a brief mention by ʻAbdu'l-Bahá in 1916 and the first Baháʼí enters Laos in about 1955. The first Baháʼí Local Spiritual Assembly is known to be first elected by 1958 in Vientiane and eventually Laos' own National Spiritual Assembly is first elected in 1967. The current community is approximately eight thousand adherents and four centers: Vientiane, Vientiane Province, Kaysone Phomvihane, Pakxe and smaller populations in other provinces. While well established and able to function as communities in these cities, Baháʼís have a harder time in other provinces and cannot print their own religious materials. The Association of Religion Data Archives (relying on World Christian Encyclopedia) estimated almost 14000 Baháʼís in 2005.

== Early days ==
=== ʻAbdu'l-Bahá's Tablets of the Divine Plan ===
Between 1883 and 1954 Laos was part of French Indochina. ʻAbdu'l-Bahá, head of the religion from 1892 to 1921, mentions French Indochina. ʻAbdu'l-Bahá wrote a series of letters, or tablets, to the followers of the religion in the United States in 1916-1917; these letters were compiled together in the book titled Tablets of the Divine Plan. The seventh of the tablets mentioned taking the Baháʼí Faith to Indochina and was written on April 11, 1916, but was delayed in being presented in the United States until 1919 — after the end of World War I and the Spanish flu. These tablets were translated and presented by Mirza Ahmad Sohrab on April 4, 1919, and published in Star of the West magazine on December 12, 1919.

(Tablet 7) "The moment this divine Message is carried forward by the American believers from the shores of America and is propagated through the continents of Europe, of Asia, of Africa and of Australasia, and as far as the islands of the Pacific, this community will find itself securely established upon the throne of an everlasting dominion..., if some teachers go to other islands and other parts, such as the continent of Australia, New Zealand, Tasmania, also to Japan, Asiatic Russia, Korea, French Indochina, Siam, Straits Settlements, India, Ceylon and Afghanistan, most great results will be forthcoming."

=== Beginnings ===
Shoghi Effendi, head of the religion from 1921 to 1957, claims the first Baháʼís to arrive in Laos and Cambodia probably in 1955 (came by April, 1956, and after Laotian independence in 1954.) This was Dr. Heshmat Ta'eed, the first pioneer to Laos. The first person to join the Baháʼí Faith in Laos was Bui Van-an who was visiting from Vietnam. In August 1956 it is noted Baháʼís from Laos tried to attend the regional conference in Djakarta, Indonesia but were denied visas. However, in November seventeen Baháʼís representing Thailand, Laos, Cambodia, and Vietnam met in Saigon, Vietnam for a regional conference. In January 1958 the Baháʼís of Vientiane celebrated World Religion Day with Buddhist Monks, a Sihk, a Hindu and government officials - and a Miss Banu Hassan is noted as another pioneer in Laos coming from the United States. In February the Baháʼís in Vientiane hosted a regional conference with Baháʼís from Vietnam and Thailand attending. In April 1958 the first Baháʼí Local Spiritual Assembly is known to be first elected. By August 1958 there is mention of a native conversion to the religion - a woman member of a black Thai ethnic minority. In December 1958 Baháʼís from Laos again attended an event in Saigon. There is also a very brief mention of a Baháʼí center in Vientiane circa 1958 where Thomas Anthony Dooley III, aka Dr. Tom Dooley, picked up his Laotian translator, Ngoan van Hoang. In January 1959 Vientiane Baháʼís again held the World Religion Day observance. By April 1959 the Baháʼís had elected a Baháʼí Local Spiritual Assembly and a registered group of Baháʼís was living in Sam Neua. In November 1959 the Baháʼís in Vientiane hosted a winter school with Baháʼís from Cambodia, Thailand, and Vietnam attending. The 1960 observance of World Religion Day gathered about 300 attendees, including members of the King's Council, Consular and United Nations officials, and representatives of various sects of six religions who took part and heard a message from the king of Laos, brought to the meeting by a prince. It was also in 1960 that Baháʼís in Vientiane acquired an authorization confirming through a special decree issued by the Ministry of Finance in Laos for the Baháʼí Community to own in its name a plot of land as an endowment.

== Growth ==
From 1957 to 1963 the regional National Assembly of South East Asia oversaw the Baháʼí communities of area from Borneo to the Philippines to Thailand with a local spiritual assembly in Vientiane. The first Thai pioneer left on June 1, 1960, for Luang Prabang Laos. By December 1960 the first from the Maew or Hmong people in Laos accept the religion in Luang Prabang where there is also an assembly. It is also known that Jacqueline and Chester Lee, who had become Baháʼís in Cambodia in 1955, moved to Vietienne 1965 where they lived until they moved to Hong Kong (Chester left in 1967 while Jacqueline left in 1969.) In Oct 1963, the National Spiritual Assembly of the Baháʼís of Thailand, with its seat in Bangkok, was given jurisdiction over the Baháʼís of Laos until 1967 when they elected their own National Spiritual Assembly with the presence of the first Hand of the Cause to visit Laos - Dr. Rahmatu'lláh Muhájir. The members of the first national assembly were: F. Missaghian, Sy Chanh, Boon My, M. Beizayee, F. Antipolo, L. Kham Say, Lau Chou, F. Faridian and C. M. Lee. In October 1967 an intercontinental conference was held in New Delhi with several Hands of the Cause and representatives of National Spiritual Assemblies from India, Ceylon, Arabia, Laos, Thailand, North East Africa, Philippines, Iran, Indonesia, Korea, Taiwan, Malaysia, South and Central Arabia, Turkey and Pakistan present. About February 1969 Hand of the Cause Abu'l-Qásim Faizi, the second to visit Laos, met with the national assembly. In April 1969 Dr. Rahmatu'lláh Muhájir made a return trip to Laos. At the fourth national convention, April 1970, it announced that the first members of the Puthai, a tribe in the Savannakhet area, as well as Meo in Laos, had joined the religion. By September 1970 the Laotian Baháʼí Publishing Trust had translated four Baha'i English books, pamphlets, and a prayer book into the Lao language and local conferences in Savannakhet and Thakkek were called with Baháʼís from each region attending. In January 1971 native Laotian Baháʼís were able to travel to an international Baháʼí conference in Singapore. In February Hand of the Cause Enoch Olinga visited Laos and in October Hand of the Cause Collis Featherstone visited Laos and traveled to several regions of Laos as well as meeting with the national assembly. In 1972 several trips of Baháʼís spread word that Maitreya Buddha had returned as Baháʼu'lláh - during which time the population of Baháʼís greatly expanded. In accord with a government request, land owned by the assembly of Vientiane was converted for growing crops - a team of youth cleared the land, fenced it in, planted and managed the crops. The second youth training institute was late January 1976 and included sessions included workshops on Baháʼí Local Spiritual Assemblies, Baháʼí views on marriage, history of the religion, Feasts and Baháʼí Holy Days, the Baháʼí Nineteen Day Fast among other topics. In May 1978 the national center in Vientiane hosted the first national children's convention.

== Modern community ==
some cities in Laos with Baháʼís

=== Focus on the society at large ===
Since its inception the religion has had involvement in socio-economic development beginning by giving greater freedom to women, promulgating the promotion of female education as a priority concern, and that involvement was given practical expression by creating schools, agricultural coops, and clinics. The religion entered a new phase of activity when a message of the Universal House of Justice dated 20 October 1983 was released. Baháʼís were urged to seek out ways, compatible with the Baháʼí teachings, in which they could become involved in the social and economic development of the communities in which they lived. Worldwide in 1979 there were 129 officially recognized Baháʼí socio-economic development projects. By 1987, the number of officially recognized development projects had increased to 1482.

In 1983 30 teachers of children's classes gathered for a seminar that included topics like the Central Figures of the Baháʼí Faith, Baha'i administration, Baháʼí teachings on loyalty to government and abstention from politics, and a viewing of Hand of the Cause Rúhíyyih Khanum's trip turned into the movie The Green Light Expedition. In 1983 scores of children regularly attend classes at Baháʼí schools held at the Ban Amon Baháʼí Center at the national center in Vientiane. By February 1984 other projects Baháʼís undertook include an assembly purchasing two cows and a community garden with profits from sales going to national and local funds.

In the 1980s, among the many refugees who came to the United States following the Vietnam War, were 200 Hmong Baháʼís from Laos who settled in Portland, Oregon. The Baháʼí community of Portland set up an after-school tutoring project initially aiming at war-torn Liberia but lacking practical connection turned to serve the Hmong children in the area around 2000-2001 and has since become more organized into a project - the Roses After School Mentoring Project.

=== Focus on internal development ===
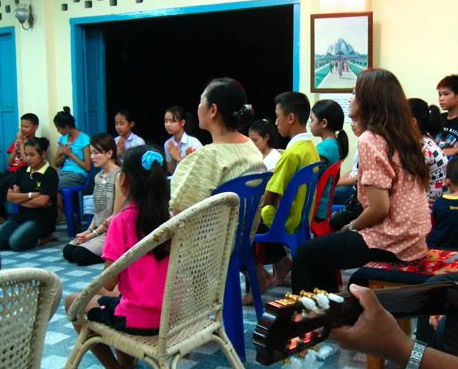
A Baha'i gathering in Vientiane in 2009.

In 1983 there were nineteen delegates for the national convention. In 1988 Hand of the Cause Collis Featherstone again toured Laos including giving public talks as well as visiting refugee camps.

However the community in Laos has been frustrated. After experiencing quick growth in the early 1970s (see above), in the 1980s the community had reached approximately eight thousand adherents and four centers: two in Vientiane, one in Vientiane Province, in the northwest and one in Kaysone Phomvihane, Savannakhet Province mid-south with smaller numbers of Baháʼís just north of Savannakhet in Khammouane Province and in the city of Pakxe in the far south and smaller populations in other provinces. The land on which the four Baháʼí centers were located was approved by the Lao government for use by the Baháʼís. Additionally, the government has given official approval for Baháʼís to use land where they already have a cemetery. The Baháʼís were planning to construct new spiritual centers in Savannkhet's Dong Bang Village and in Lat Khouay Village near Vientiane. They have received both village and district level approval to use the land, but were awaiting the official land deeds from the District Land Offices. The Baháʼí spiritual assemblies in Vientiane and Kaysone Phomvihane cities practiced freely, but smaller communities in Khammouane and Savannakhet provinces have periodically faced restrictions by local authorities. From 2001 some local officials in Luang Prabang in the north central area acted harshly toward Baháʼís and Christians. Examples included forced renunciations that sometimes involved forced participation in animist traditions, including the drinking of animal blood. Other officials forced some believers to drink alcohol and smoke cigarettes against their will. Efforts by local officials to force Baháʼís to renounce their faith continued in some areas. In more isolated cases, provincial authorities instructed their officials to monitor and arrest Baháʼís and other religions. In some cases in 2005 some Baháʼís were threatened with arrest or expulsion from their villages in some provinces if they did not comply

The Vientiane Baháʼí assembly previously encountered difficulties establishing its ownership of the Baháʼí center in Vientiane; however, in 2005 authorities granted approval for use of the property by the Baháʼís. Baháʼí local spiritual assemblies and the national spiritual assembly routinely held Baháʼí Nineteen Day Feasts and celebrated all Baháʼí holy days. The National Spiritual Assembly based in Vientiane met regularly and has sent delegations to the Universal House of Justice in Haifa, Israel. The Government prohibited foreigners from proselytizing, although it permitted foreign non-governmental organizations (NGOs) with religious affiliations to work in the country. Foreigners caught distributing religious materials could be arrested or deported. Decree 92 specifically authorized proselytizing by local citizens, providing the Lao Front for National Construction (LFNC) (see Constitution of Laos) approves the activity. In practice the authorities interpreted proselytizing as an illegal activity that creates divisiveness in society.

Although Decree 92 authorized the printing of non-Buddhist religious texts and allowed religious materials to be imported from abroad, it also required permission for such activities from the LFNC. As early as 2005 there are reports the LFNC did not authorize Baháʼís to print their own religious materials, although they had been seeking permission to do so for several years. Some believers bring religious materials into the country; however, these persons face possible arrest.

As of 2009 outreach is underway in Oudomsai, Xiang Khouang, Luang Prabang, and Salavan Provinces.

=== Demographics ===
There is a 2000 estimate of more than 1,200 members and a 2006 estimate of approximately eight thousand. In 2008 Baháʼís estimated their population at 8,500 adherents. The Association of Religion Data Archives (relying on World Christian Encyclopedia) estimated some 13,960 Baháʼís in 2005.

== See also ==
- Baháʼí Faith by country
- Religion in Laos
  Freedom of religion in Laos
- History of Laos
  Provinces of Laos
