= Jean Khamsé Vithavong =

Laotian Roman Catholic prelate (1942–2024)

His Excellency Jean Khamsé Vithavong
- Apostolic Vicar Emeritus of Vientiane
- Installed: 7 April 1984
- Term ended: 2 February 2017
- Predecessor: Thomas Nantha
- Successor: Louis-Marie Ling Mangkhanekhoun
- Other post: Titular Bishop of Moglaena (1982–2024)

Orders
- Ordination: 26 January 1975
- Consecration: 16 January 1983 by Thomas Nantha, Jean-Baptiste Outhay Thepmany, Renato Raffaele Martino

Personal details
- Born: 18 October 1942 Keng Sadoc, Laos, French Indochina
- Died: 8 December 2024 (aged 82) Vientiane, Laos

Jean Khamsé Vithavong (18 October 1942 – 8 December 2024) was a Laotian Roman Catholic prelate, and the Apostolic Vicar of Vientiane. He was also the Titular Bishop of Moglaena.

== Biography ==
Khamsé Vithavong was born on 18 October 1942. He was educated at a seminary in France and at Ateneo de Manila University in the Philippines.

On 26 January 1975, at the age of 32, he was ordained a priest and a member of the Oblates of Mary Immaculate.

On 19 November 1982, he was appointed coadjutor vicar apostolic of Vientiane, Laos, and also titular bishop of Moglaena, by Pope John Paul II, and he subsequently was installed on 7 April 1984. He served as well as administrator of the Luang Prabang vicariate from 1984 to 1999. He was also a presiding manager of the Episcopal Conference of Laos and Cambodia in the 1990s and early 2000s.

In 1999, he was interviewed about the Laotian socialist government's prosecutions of his diocese.

Khamsé Vithavong retired as emeritus on 2 February 2017, which was accepted by Pope Francis. He died on 8 December 2024, at the age of 82, after suffering from diabetes and a series of strokes.

== See also ==
- Catholic Church in Laos
- Christianity in Laos
- Religion in Laos

== Bibliography ==
- Morev, Lev (1998), "Religion, state, and society in contemporary Laos", Religions, State, and Society, 26 (1): 31–38, doi:10.1080/09637499808431803

Catholic Church titles
| Preceded by Thomas Nantha | Apostolic Vicar of Vientiane; 1984–2017 | Succeeded by Louis-Marie Ling Mangkhanekhoun |
| Preceded by Edward Cornelius O'Leary | Titular Bishop of Moglaena; 1982–2024 | Succeeded by Vacant |
