= Co-Cathedral of St. Therese, Savannakhet =

Co-Cathedral of St. Therese
- Cocathédrale Sainte-Thérèse de Savannakhet
- ໂບດກາໂຕລິກ ນັກບຸນເຕເຣຊາ
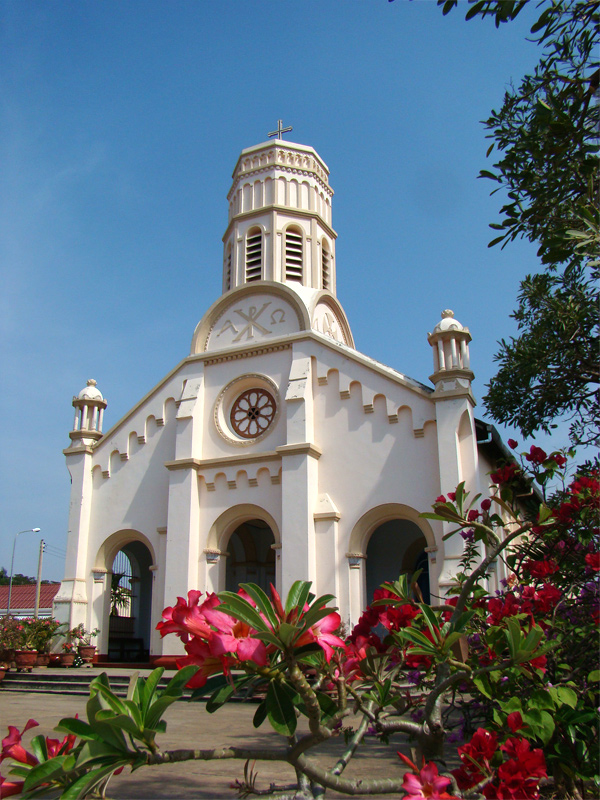
- Co-Cathedral of St. Therese
- 16.5570°N 104.7486°E
- Location: Savannakhet
- Country: Laos
- Denomination: Roman Catholic Church

The Co-Cathedral of St. Therese (Lao: ໂບດກາໂຕລິກ ນັກບຸນເຕເຣຊາ; French: Cocathédrale Sainte-Thérèse de Savannakhet), also called St. Therese Cathedral, is the Roman Catholic Co-Cathedral located in the city of Savannakhet in southern part of Laos, near the border with Thailand.

The temple follows the Latin rite and functions as one of the two cathedrals and major churches of the Apostolic Vicariate of Savannakhet (Latin: Vicariatus Apostolicus Savannakhetensis; Laotian: ອັກຄະສາວົກແທນຂອງສະຫວັນນະເຂດ) who was elevated to its current status in 1958 by Pope Pius XII with the Bull Qui ad Ecclesiae. The other temple that serves as the mother church of the Vicariate is the St. Louis Cathedral in Thakhek.

It is under the pastoral responsibility of the Bishop Jean Marie Prida Inthirath.

== See also ==
- Roman Catholicism in Laos
- Co-Cathedral

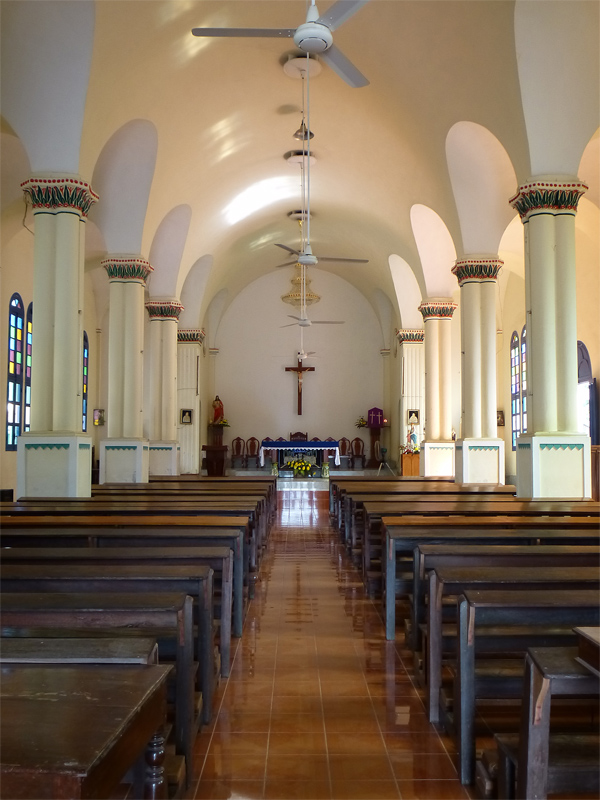
Internal view
