= List of Catholic dioceses in Laos and Cambodia =

The Catholic Church in Laos and Cambodia, both former French colonies in Indochina (Southeast Asia), consists solely of an entirely missionary Latin hierarchy, which is joined in a single Episcopal Conference of Laos and Cambodia (French acronym CELAC). There are only pre-diocesan jurisdictions (all exempt, i.e. not part of an ecclesiastical province but directly dependent on the Holy See and its missionary Roman Congregation Propaganda Fide), no single proper see yet :

- five Apostolic Vicariates, in Laos except one in Cambodia - only they are entitled to a titular bishop
- two Apostolic Prefectures, both in Cambodia.

All defunct jurisdictions have current successors. Formally, there is an Apostolic Nunciature to Cambodia, roughly equivalent to an embassy, and an Apostolic Delegation to Laos, a lower status of representation. These offices are vested, along with the Apostolic Nunciature to Myanmar in the Apostolic Nuncio to Thailand, who resides in Bangkok.

Jurisdictions in Cambodia

- Apostolic Vicariate of Phnom Penh
- Apostolic Prefecture of Battambang
- Apostolic Prefecture of Kompong Cham

Jurisdictions in Laos

- Apostolic Vicariate of Luang Prabang
- Apostolic Vicariate of Pakse
- Apostolic Vicariate of Savannakhet
- Apostolic Vicariate of Vientiane
