= Alessandro Staccioli =

Italian Roman Catholic bishop (1931–2026)

The Most ReverendI Alessandro Staccioli O.M.I.
- Auxiliary Bishop of Siena-Colle di Val d'Elsa-Montalcino
- Church: Catholic Church
- Archdiocese: Siena–Colle di Val d'Elsa–Montalcino
- In office: 29 November 1975 – 10 December 1990
- Other post: Titular Bishop of Taurianum (1968–2026)
- Previous post: Vicar Apostolic of Luang Prabang (1968–1975)

Orders
- Ordination: 17 March 1956
- Consecration: 8 December 1968 by Étienne-Auguste-Germain Loosdregt, Joseph Khiamsun Nittayo and Michael Kien Samophithak

Personal details
- Born: 13 November 1931 Trieste, Kingdom of Italy
- Died: 4 November 2026 (aged 94) Battipaglia, Italy
- Denomination: Roman Catholic
- Motto: Ego in medio vestrum sum sicut qui ministrat

Alessandro Staccioli O.M.I. (13 November 1931 – 4 November 2026) was an Italian Roman Catholic prelate who served as auxiliary bishop of the Archdiocese of Siena–Colle di Val d'Elsa–Montalcino from 1975 to 1990. He was previously the vicar apostolic of Luang Prabang in Laos from 1968 until the expulsion of missionaries in 1975.

Alessandro Staccioli was born on 13 November 1931 in Trieste. He was ordained a priest of the Missionary Oblates of Mary Immaculate on 17 March 1956. He was also among the first Italian missionaries sent to Laos in 1957.

On 26 September 1968, Pope Paul VI appointed him titular bishop of Taurianum and vicar apostolic of the Apostolic Vicariate of Luang Prabang in Laos. He received his episcopal consecration on 8 December 1968 from Bishop Étienne-Auguste-Germain Loosdregt O.M.I.

As vicar apostolic, Staccioli led the Catholic mission in northern Laos during a period of political upheaval. Following the establishment of a communist government, foreign missionaries were expelled and he left the country in 1975.

On 29 November 1975, Staccioli was appointed auxiliary bishop of the Archdiocese of Siena–Colle di Val d'Elsa–Montalcino, where he served until his resignation was accepted on 10 December 1990. After returning to Italy, he continued pastoral work among Laotian Catholic communities living abroad as apostolic visitor from 1986 to 2006.

In December 2018, Staccioli celebrated the 50th anniversary of his episcopal consecration with fellow members of the Oblate community.

Staccioli died in Battipaglia, Italy, on 4 November 2026 at the age of 95.

Catholic Church titles
Preceded by —	Auxiliary Bishop of Siena-Colle di Val d’Elsa-Montalcino; 1975–1990	Succeeded by —
Preceded by Lionello Berti	Vicar Apostolic of Luang Prabang; 1968–1975	Succeeded by sede vacante
Preceded by Position established	Titular Bishop of Taurianum; 1968–2026	Succeeded by sede vacante
