= Thomas Nantha =

Laotian Roman Catholic prelate (1909–1984)

His Excellency Thomas Nantha
- Vicar Apostolic of Vientiane
- Installed: 22 May 1975
- Term ended: 7 April 1984
- Predecessor: Etienne-Auguste-Germain Loosdregt, M.E.P.
- Successor: Jean Khamsé Vithavong
- Previous post: Auxiliary bishop of Vientiane

Orders
- Ordination: 27 June 1935
- Consecration: 30 June 1974 by Pope Paul VI

Personal details
- Born: 6 October 1925 Pakxan
- Died: 7 April 1984 (aged 74)

Thomas Nantha (3 October 1909 – 7 April 1984) was a Laotian Roman Catholic prelate. He was titular bishop of Succuba from 1974 until his death and vicar apostolic of Vientiane from 1975 to 1984.

== Career ==
He was consecrated by pope Paul VI on 30 June 1974 in St. Peter's Basilica. He was also apostolic administrator of Luang Prabang from 1975 to 1984. He was also a presiding manager of the Episcopal Conference of Laos and Cambodia from 1979 to 1984. He died on 7 April 1984 at the age of 74.

Catholic Church titles
Preceded by Etienne-Auguste-Germain Loosdregt, O.M.I.	Vicar Apostolic of Vientiane; 1975–1984	Succeeded by Jean Khamsé Vithavong, O.M.I.
Preceded by Georges Cabana	Titular Bishop of Succuba; 1974–1984	Succeeded by Eugène Tremblay
