= Jean-Pierre Urkia =

Jean-Pierre Urkia, M.E.P.
- Titular Bishop of Masclianae
- Church: Roman Catholic Church
- See: Titular See of Masclianae
- In office: 1967–2011
- Predecessor: None
- Successor: incumbent

Orders
- Ordination: 26 June 1942

Personal details
- Born: 27 November 1918; Espelette, France
- Died: 21 December 2011 (aged 93)

Jean-Pierre Urkia M.E.P. (27 November 1918 – 21 December 2011) was a French Vicar Apostolic of the Roman Catholic Church.

Jean Urkia was born in Espelette, France and was ordained as a priest on 26 June 1942 from the missionary institute, the Paris Foreign Missions Society (in French : Société des Missions étrangères de Paris). He was appointed to the Vicariate Apostolic of Paksé and made Titular Bishop of Masclianae on 12 June 1967. He was ordained bishop on 27 September 1967. He remained Vicar Apostolic until 10 June 1975, When he was expelled from the country by the communist régime with all the remaining missionaries.
