= Apostolic Vicariate of Pakse =

Catholic missionary jurisdiction in Laos

Apostolic Vicariate of Paksé Vicariatus Apostolicus Paksensis ອັກຄະສາວົກແທຂອງເມືອງປາກເຊ

Location
- Country: Laos
- Territory: Champasak, Attapeu, Salavan/Saravan, and Sekong/Xekong
- Episcopal conference: Episcopal Conference of Laos and Cambodia
- Metropolitan: Immediately subject to the Holy See
- Coordinates: 15.1172552°N 105.8013389°E

Statistics
- Area: 59,210 km^{2} (22,860 sq mi)
- Population: Total; Catholics: (as of 2020); 1,484,186; 21,445 (1.44%)
- Parishes: 57

Information
- First holder: Jean-Pierre Urkia, M.E.P.
- Denomination: Roman Catholic
- Sui iuris church: Latin Church
- Rite: Roman Rite
- Established: 12 June 1967 (59 years, 143 days)
- Cathedral: Cathedral of the Sacred Heart in Pakse
- Secular priests: 8

Current leadership
- Pope: Leo XIV
- Apostolic Vicar: Andrew Souksavath Nouane Asa
- Bishops emeritus: Cardinal Louis-Marie Ling Mangkhanekhoun, I.V.D.

Map
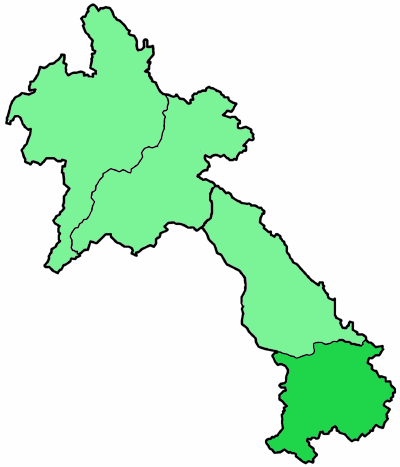

The Apostolic Vicariate of Pakse (Latin: Vicariatus Apostolicus Paksensis) is a Latin rite missionary territorial jurisdiction of the Catholic Church in Laos. As an apostolic vicariate, it is a pre-diocesan jurisdiction, entitled to a titular bishop. It covers southern Laos.

It is exempt, i.e., not part of any ecclesiastical province but directly dependent on the Holy See and notably its missionary Dicastery for Evangelization.

Its cathedral episcopal see is Cathedral of the Sacred Heart, in Pakse.

== History ==
The vicariate was established on 12 June 1967 as Apostolic Vicariate of Pakse / Paksé (French) / 巴色 (正體中文) / Paksen(sis) (Latin adjective), when it was split off from the Apostolic Vicariate of Savannakhet.

== Statistics and extent ==
The vicariate covers the Laotian provinces of Champasak, Salavan, Xekong and Attapu, but most of the Catholics live in Champasak and Saravan.

Covering an area of 45,000 km² of southern Laos, the Vicariate is the smallest of the apostolic vicariates in Laos. As of 2016, only about 15,000 (1.3%) of approximately 1.3 million people living in the area are members of the Catholic Church, half of them belonging to ethnic minorities. It is subdivided into 46 parishes served by only 7 priests. There are also 19 sisters from the Soeurs de la Charite (Sisters of Charity) and the Filles Marie de la Croix (Daughters of Mary of the Cross). As per 2014 it has 7 priests (6 diocesan, 1 religious), 22 lay religious (10 brothers, 12 sisters) and 16 seminarians.

== Ordinaries ==
=== Apostolic Vicars of Pakse ===
- Jean-Pierre Urkia, M.E.P. (1967–1975)
- Thomas Khamphan (1975–2000)
- Cardinal Louis-Marie Ling Mangkhanekhoun, I.V.D. (2000–2017), appointed Apostolic Vicar of Vientiane
- Andrew Souksavath Nouane Asa (since 2022)

== See also ==
- List of Catholic dioceses in Laos
