= Apostolic Vicariate of Vientiane =

Catholic missionary jurisdiction in Laos

Apostolic Vicariate of Vientiane Vicariatus Apostolicus Vientianensis ອັກຄະສາວົກແທນຂອງນະຄອນຫຼວງວຽງ
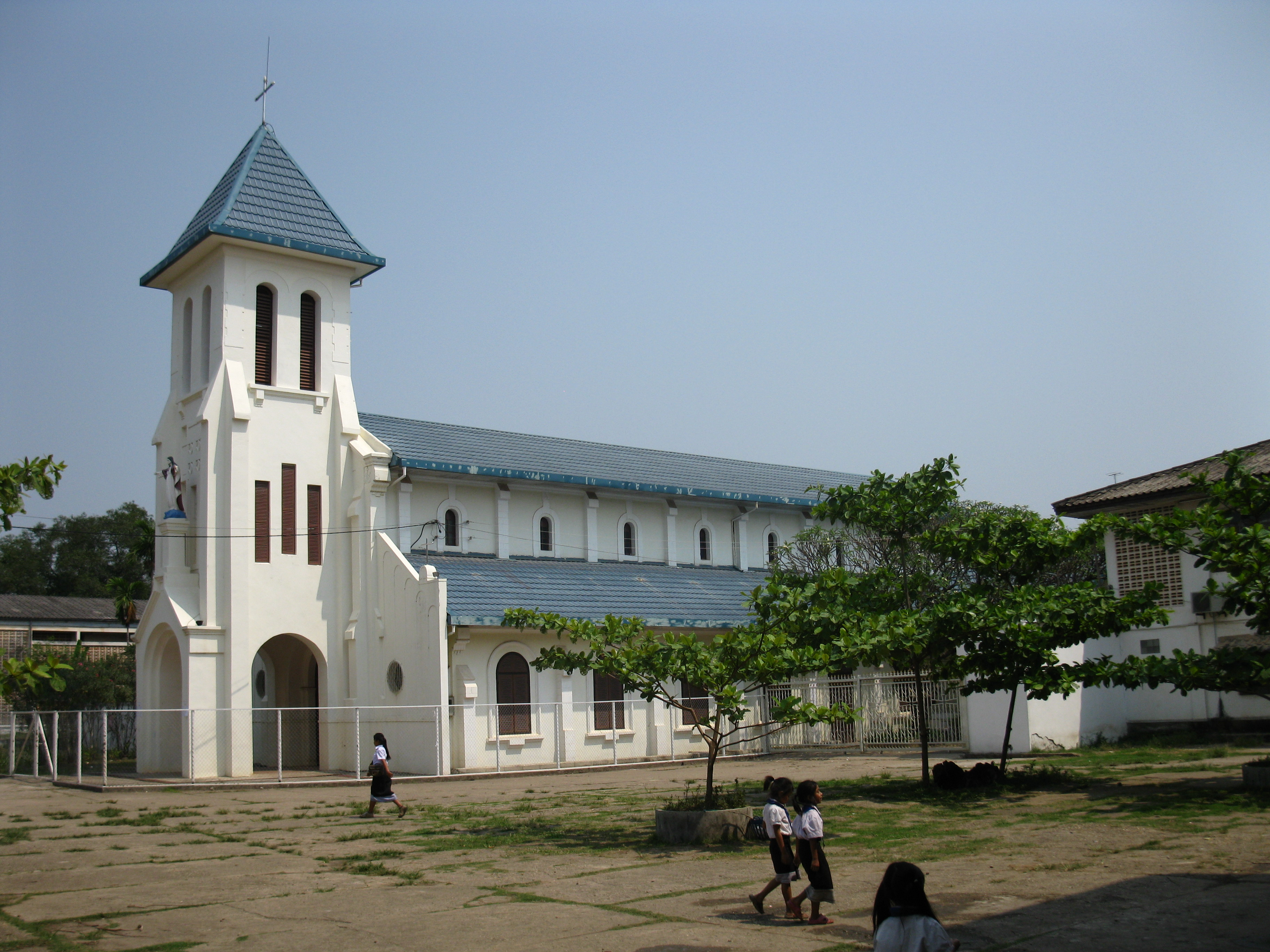
- Cathedral of the Sacred Heart

Location
- Country: Laos
- Metropolitan: Immediately subject to the Holy See

Statistics
- Area: 98,000 km^{2} (38,000 sq mi)
- Population: Total; Catholics: (as of 2002); 1.5 million; 11,120 (0.8%)

Information
- Rite: Latin
- Cathedral: Sacred Heart Cathedral

Current leadership
- Pope: Leo XIV
- Vicar Apostolic: Anthony Adoun Hongsaphong
- Bishops emeritus: Louis-Marie Ling Mangkhanekhoun

Map
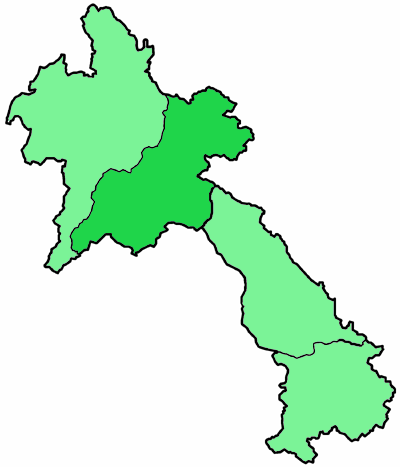

The Apostolic Vicariate (or Vicariate Apostolic) of Vientiane (Latin: Vicariatus Apostolicus Vientianensis; Lao: ອັກຄະສາວົກແທນຂອງນະຄອນຫຼວງວຽງ) is a territorial jurisdiction of the Catholic Church located in northern Laos.

As an apostolic vicariate, it is a pre-diocesan jurisdiction, entitled to a titular bishop, and it is exempt, i.e., not part of any ecclesiastical province and instead directly dependent on the Holy See through the Congregation for the Evangelization of Peoples.

The Apostolic Vicariate's episcopal cathedral see is Sacred Heart Cathedral in Vientiane, one of the country's largest churches. Bishop Anthony Adoun Hongsaphong is its apostolic vicar.

== Statistics ==
The vicariate covers 74,195 km² in the civil Laotian provinces of Houaphan, Xiangkhoang, Vientiane Province, Vientiane Prefecture and most of Bolikhamsai.

As per 2014 it pastorally served 14,947 Catholics (0.7% of 2,216,558 total) in 23 parishes with 5 priests (1 diocesan, 4 religious) and 24 lay religious (4 brothers, 20 sisters).

== History ==
The vicariate dates back to the Apostolic Prefecture of Vientiane and Luang-Prabang, which was created on June 14, 1938, by splitting off the northern part of the Apostolic Vicariate of Laos.

On March 13, 1952, it was elevated to an Apostolic vicariate and renamed Vientiane after its largest city, the Laotian national capital.

The northern part around Luang Prabang was split off on March 3, 1963, to establish the Apostolic Vicariate of Luang Prabang, which since then has often been held in personal union with Vientiane or by an Apostolic administrator.

== Ordinaries ==
=== Apostolic Prefect of Vientiane and Luang-Prabang ===
- Giovanni Enrico Mazoyer, O.M.I. (1938-1952)

=== Apostolic Vicars of Vientiane ===
- Etienne-Auguste-Germain Loosdregt, O.M.I. (1952-1975)
- Thomas Nantha (1975-1984)
- Jean Khamsé Vithavong, O.M.I. (1984-2017)
- Cardinal Louis-Marie Ling Mangkhanekhoun, I.V.D. (2017–2024)
- Anthony Adoun Hongsaphong (2025–present)

=== Coadjutor Bishop ===
- Jean Khamsé Vithavong, O.M.I. (1982-1984)

=== Auxiliary Bishop ===
- Lionello Berti, O.M.I. (1962-1963), appointed Apostolic Vicar of Luang Prabang
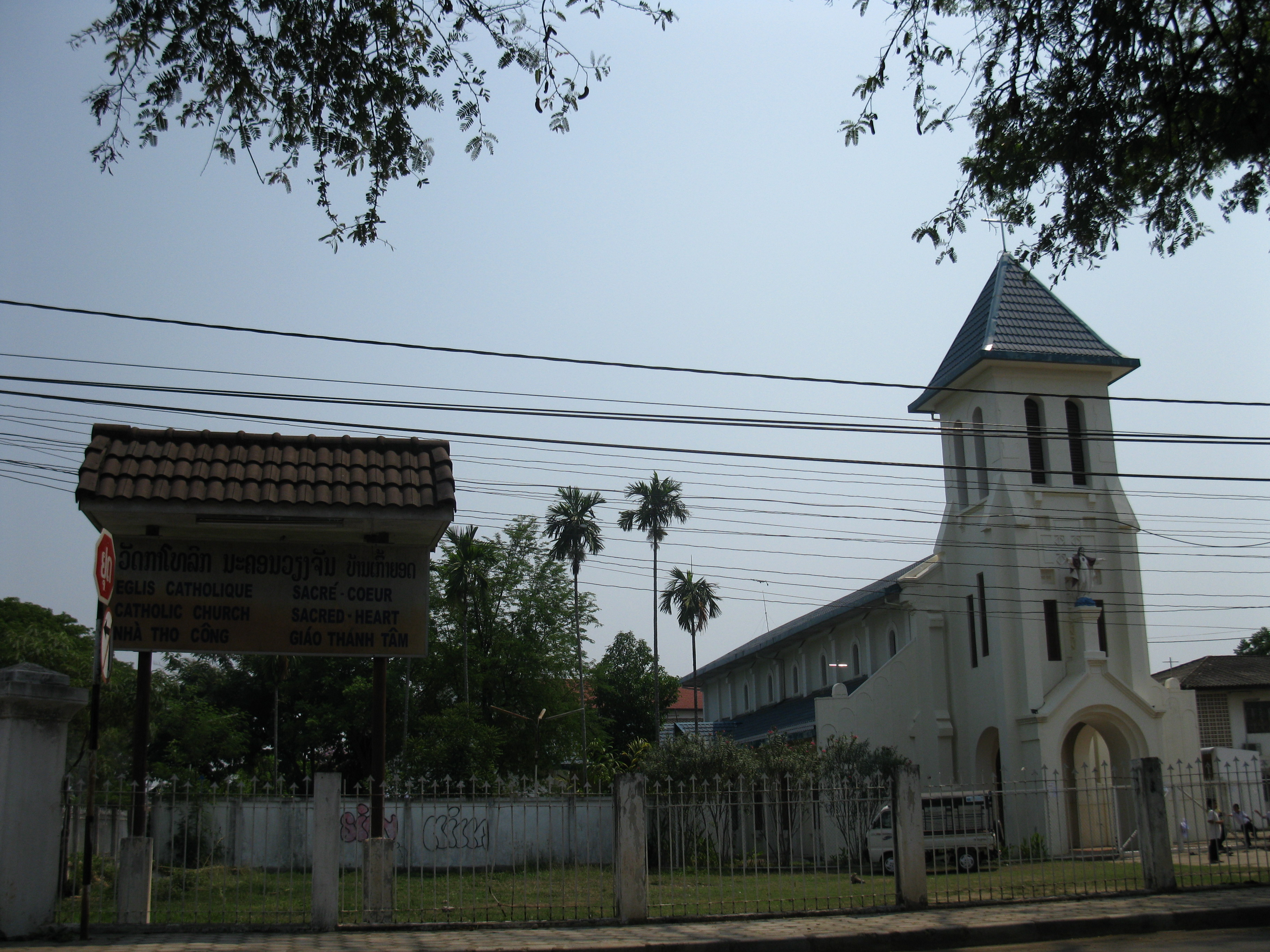
"Sacred Heart Church" in Vientiane.

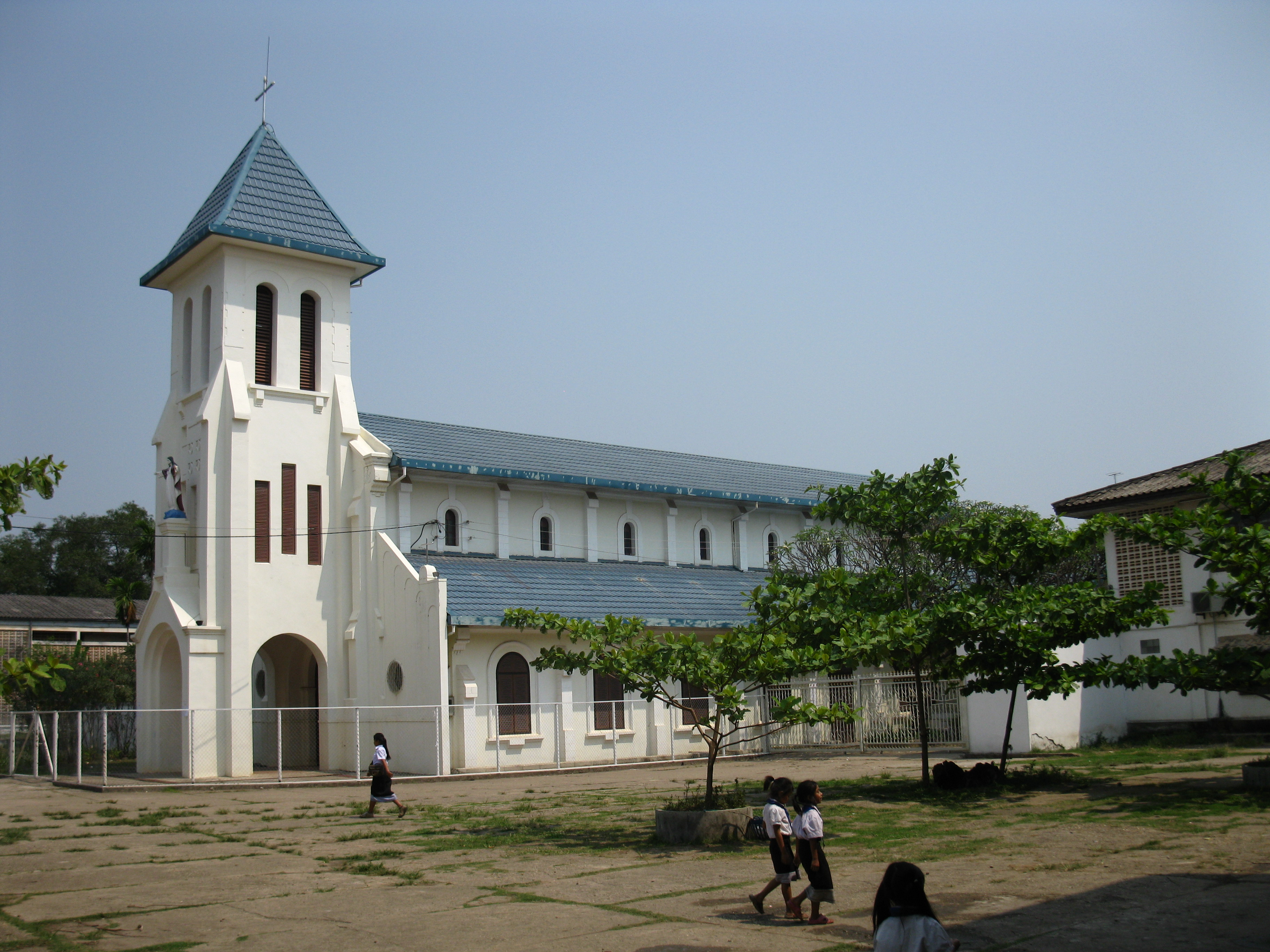
"Sacred Heart Church" in Vientiane.

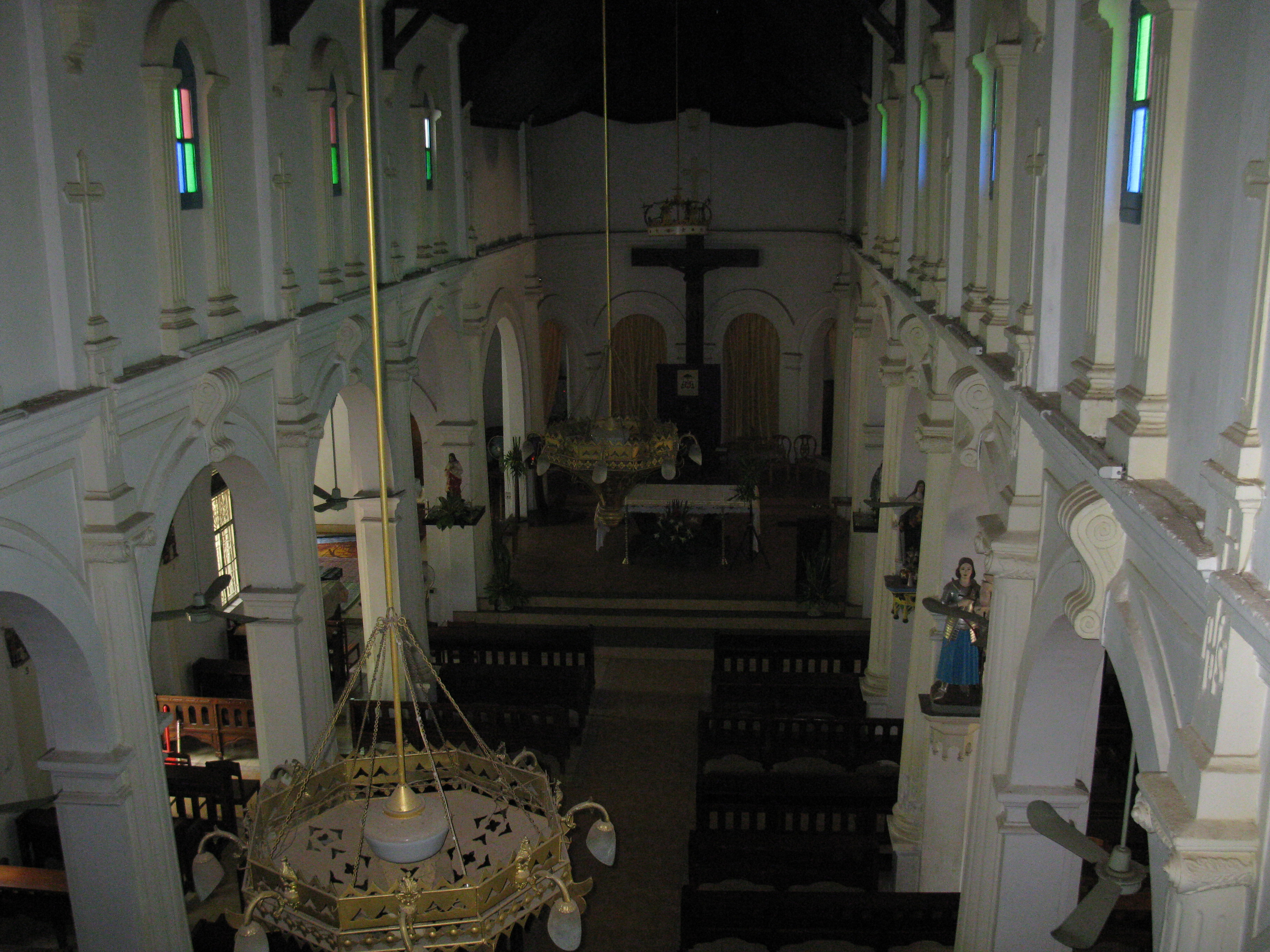
"Sacred Heart Church" in Vientiane.

== See also ==
- List of Catholic dioceses in Laos

== Sources and external links ==
- GCatholic, with Google satellite photo
- Catholic hierarchy
