= Sacred Heart Cathedral, Vientiane =

Sacred Heart Cathedral
- Cathédrale du Sacré-Cœur de Vientiane
- ວັດກາໂທລິກ ນະຄອນວຽງຈັນ
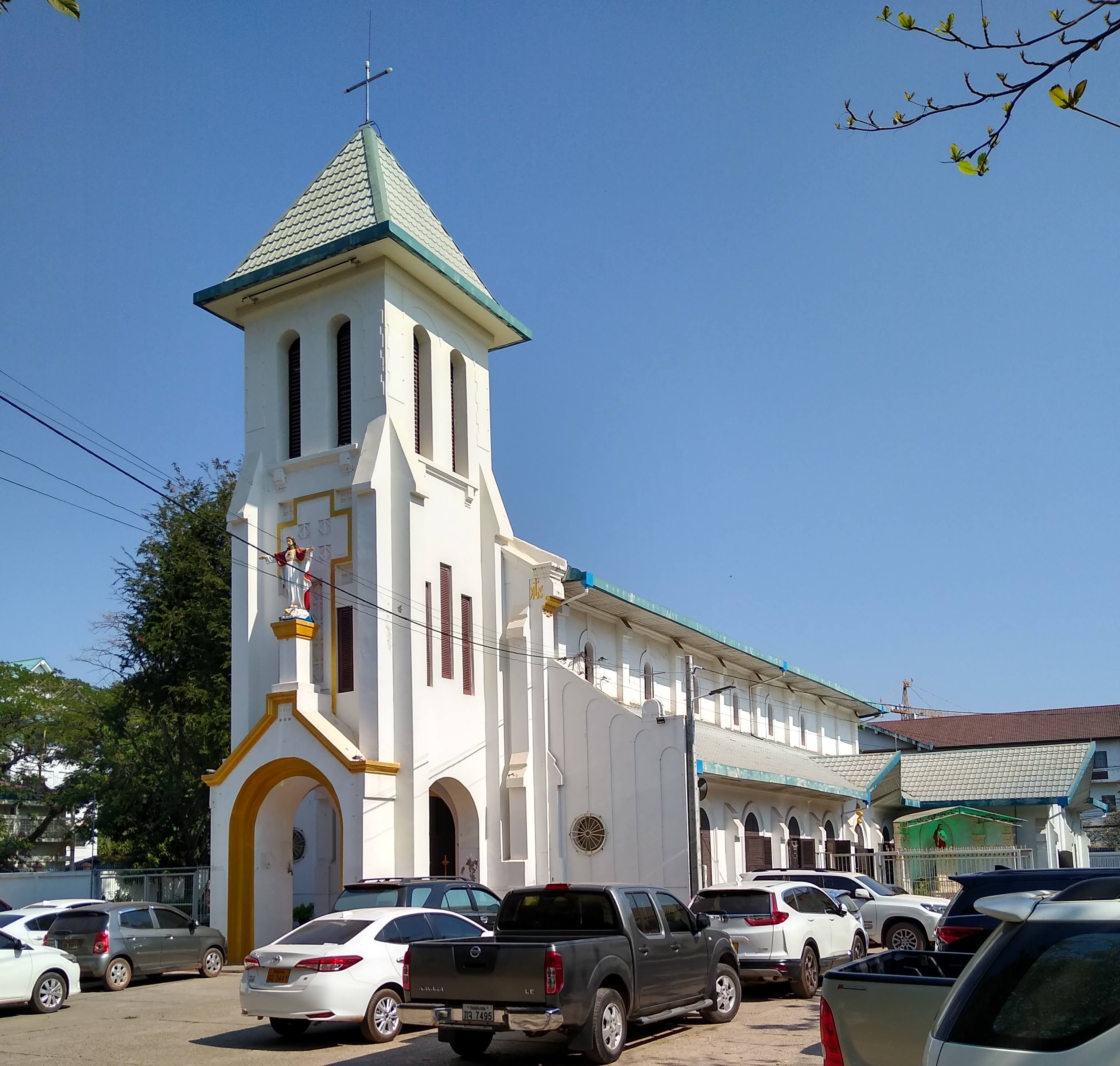
- Sacred Heart Cathedral, Vientiane
- Sacred Heart Cathedral
- 17.96154°N 102.6148°E
- Location: Vientiane
- Country: Laos
- Denomination: Roman Catholic Church

History
- Founded: 1928

Architecture
- Architectural type: Neo-romanesque

The Sacred Heart Cathedral (Lao: ວັດກາໂທລິກ ນະຄອນວຽງຈັນ; French: Cathédrale du Sacré-Cœur de Vientiane), also called Vientiane Cathedral, is the name given to a Roman Catholic cathedral in the city of Vientiane, the capital of Laos. The temple is situated at the Rue de la Mission and near the French Embassy in Laos.

The cathedral was built in 1928, when Laos was part of the French Indochina, at the time of the Paris Foreign Missions Society, soon followed by the Missionary Oblates of Mary Immaculate. The temple architecture belongs to the neo-romanesque style and it has images of Saint Joan of Arc and Saint Thérèse of Lisieux. The temple follows the Latin rite and serves as the mother church of the Apostolic Vicariate of Vientiane (Vicariatus Apostolicus Vientianensis, ອັກຄະສາວົກແທນຂອງນະຄອນຫຼວງວຽງ), which was raised to its current status by bull "Est in Sanctae Sedis" of Pope Pius XII in 1952. The cathedral was renovated in 2004/2005.

It is under the pastoral responsibility of the Bishop Jean Khamse Vithavong, OMI.

== See also ==
- Roman Catholicism in Laos
- Sacred Heart Cathedral (disambiguation)
