= Religion in Laos =

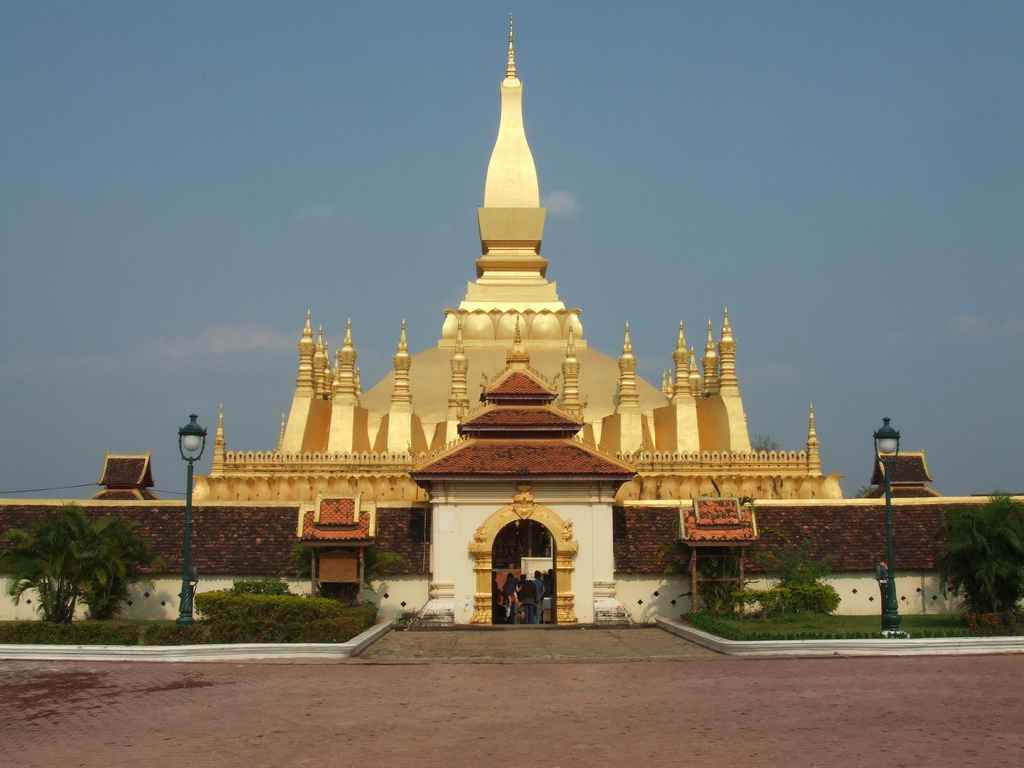
The Pha That Luang (Golden Stupa), a Buddhist stupa that is a national symbol of Laos.

Religion in Laos (2015 census)
1. Buddhism (64.7%)
2. No religion (31.4%)
3. Christianity (1.70%)
4. other religions/not stated (2.10%)

Theravada Buddhism is the largest and dominant religion in Laos. Theravada Buddhism is central to Lao cultural identity. The national symbol of Laos is the That Luang stupa, a stupa with a pyramidal base capped by the representation of a closed lotus blossom which was built to protect relics of the Buddha. It is practiced by 66% of the population. Almost all ethnic or "lowland" Lao people (Lao Loum and Lao Lom) are followers of Theravada Buddhism; however, they constitute more than 50% of the population. The remainder of the population belongs to at least 48 distinct ethnic minority groups. Most of these ethnic groups are practitioners of Tai folk religions, with beliefs that vary greatly among groups.

Tai folk religion is predominant among northern groups of Tai people, such as the Thai Dam and Thai Daeng, as well as among Mon-Khmer and Tibeto-Burman groups. Even among lowland Lao, many pre-Buddhist phi religious beliefs have been incorporated into Theravada Buddhist practice. Catholics and Protestants constitute between 1% and 2% of the population. Other minority religious groups include Baháʼí Faith, Islam, Mahayana Buddhism, and Confucianism. A very small number of citizens are atheist or agnostic.

Although the government prohibits foreigners from proselytizing, some resident foreigners associated with private businesses or nongovernmental organizations quietly engage in religious activity. The Lao Front for National Construction is in charge of religious affairs within the country and all religious organizations within Laos must register with it.

== History ==
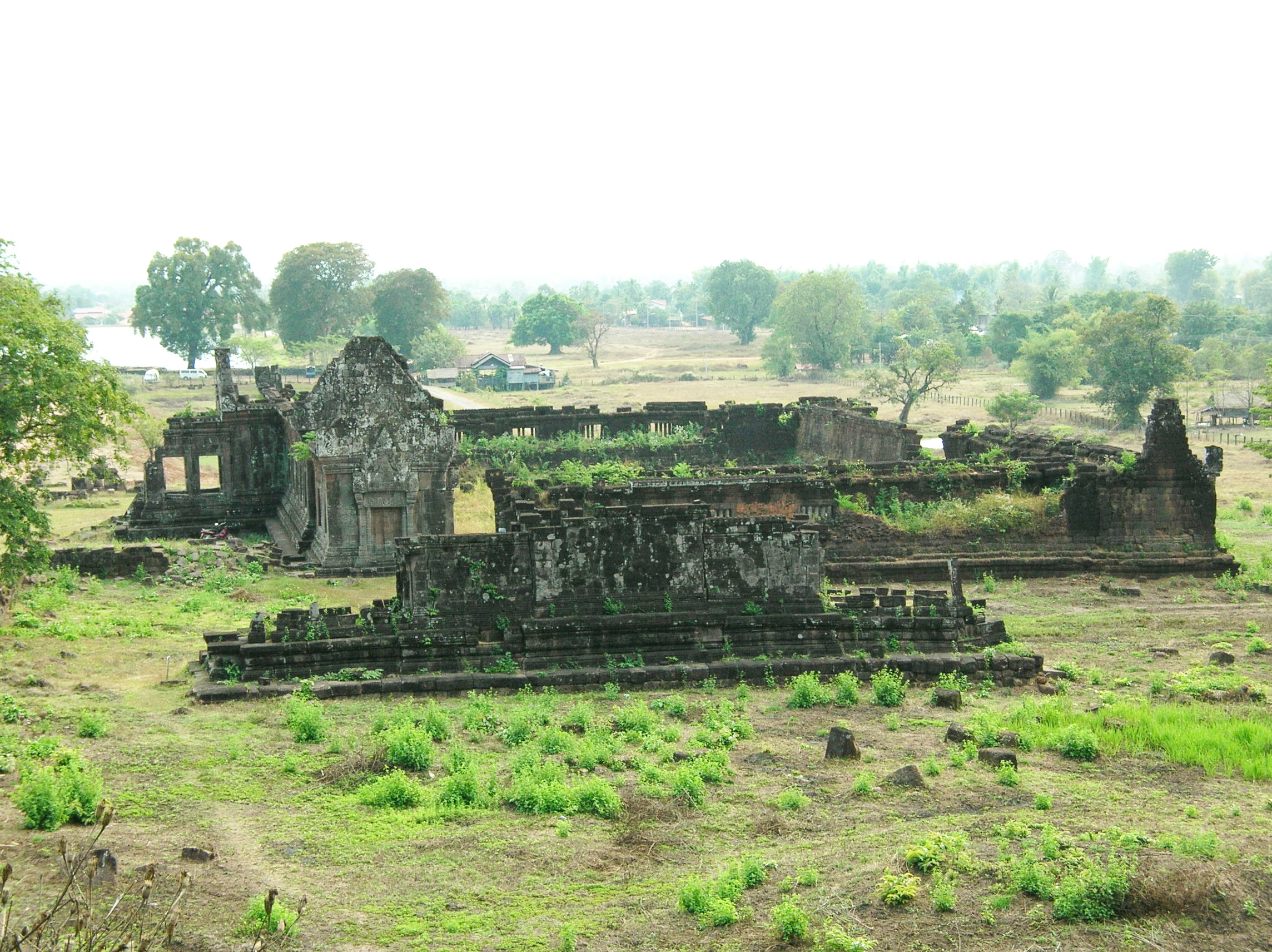
Vat Phou, a ruined Khmer temple complex in southern Laos. It was originally used for worship of the Hindu god Shiva, but was converted for use as a Buddhist temple.

Buddhism was introduced to Laos beginning in the eighth century by Mon Buddhist monks and was widespread by the fourteenth century. A number of Laotian kings were important patrons of Buddhism.

Beginning in the late 1950s, the Pathet Lao attempted to convert monks to the leftist cause and to use the status of the sangha to influence the thoughts and attitudes of the populace. The effort was in many ways successful, despite efforts by the Royal Lao Government to place the sangha under close civil administrative control and to enlist monks in development and refugee assistance programs. Political scientist Martin Stuart-Fox attributed the success of the Pathet Lao to the inability of the Lao Loum elite to integrate the monarchy, government, and sangha into a set of mutually supportive institutions.

Popular resentment of the aristocracy, division of the sangha into two antagonistic sects, the low level of its religious education and discipline, and opposition to foreign (i.e., Western) influence all contributed to the receptiveness of many monks to Pathet Lao overtures. The politicization of the sangha by both sides lowered its status in the eyes of many, but its influence at the village level augmented popular support for the Pathet Lao political platform, which paved the way for the change in government in 1975.

The LPDR government's successful efforts to consolidate its authority also continues to influence Buddhism. In political seminars at all levels, the government taught that Marxism and Buddhism were basically compatible because both disciplines stated that all men are equal, and both aimed to end suffering. Political seminars further discouraged "wasteful" expenditures on religious activities of all kinds, because some monks were sent to political reeducation centers and others were forbidden to preach.

The renunciation of private property by the monks was seen as approaching the ideal of a future communist society. However, Buddhist principles of detachment and nonmaterialism are clearly at odds with the Marxist doctrine of economic development, and popular expenditures on religious donations for merit making are also seen as depriving the state of resources. Thus, although overtly espousing tolerance of Buddhism, the state undercut the authority and moral standing of the sangha by compelling monks to spread party propaganda and by keeping local monks from their traditional participation in most village decisions and activities.

During this period of political consolidation, many monks left the sangha or fled to Thailand. Other pro-Pathet Lao monks joined the newly formed Lao United Buddhists Association, which replaced the former religious hierarchy. The numbers of men and boys being ordained declined abruptly, and many wat fell empty. Participation at weekly and monthly religious ceremonies also dropped off as villagers under the watchful eye of local political cadre were fearful of any behavior not specifically encouraged.

The nadir of Buddhism in Laos occurred around 1979, after which a strategic liberalization of policy occurred. Since that time, the number of monks has gradually increased, although as of 1993, the main concentrations continue to be in Vientiane and other Mekong Valley cities. Buddhist schools in the cities remain but have come to include a significant political component in the curriculum. Party officials are allowed to participate at Buddhist ceremonies and even to be ordained as monks to earn religious merit following the death of close relatives. The level of religious understanding and orthodoxy of the sangha, however, is no higher than it had been before 1975, when it was criticized by many as backward and unobservant of the precepts.

From the late 1980s, stimulated as much by economic reform as political relaxation, donations to the wat and participation at Buddhist festivals began to increase sharply. Festivals at the village and neighborhood level became more elaborate, and the That Luang festival and fair, which until 1986 had been restricted to a three-day observance, lasted for seven days. Ordinations also increased, in towns and at the village level, and household ceremonies of blessing, in which monks were central participants, also began to recur.

== Religions ==
=== Buddhism ===
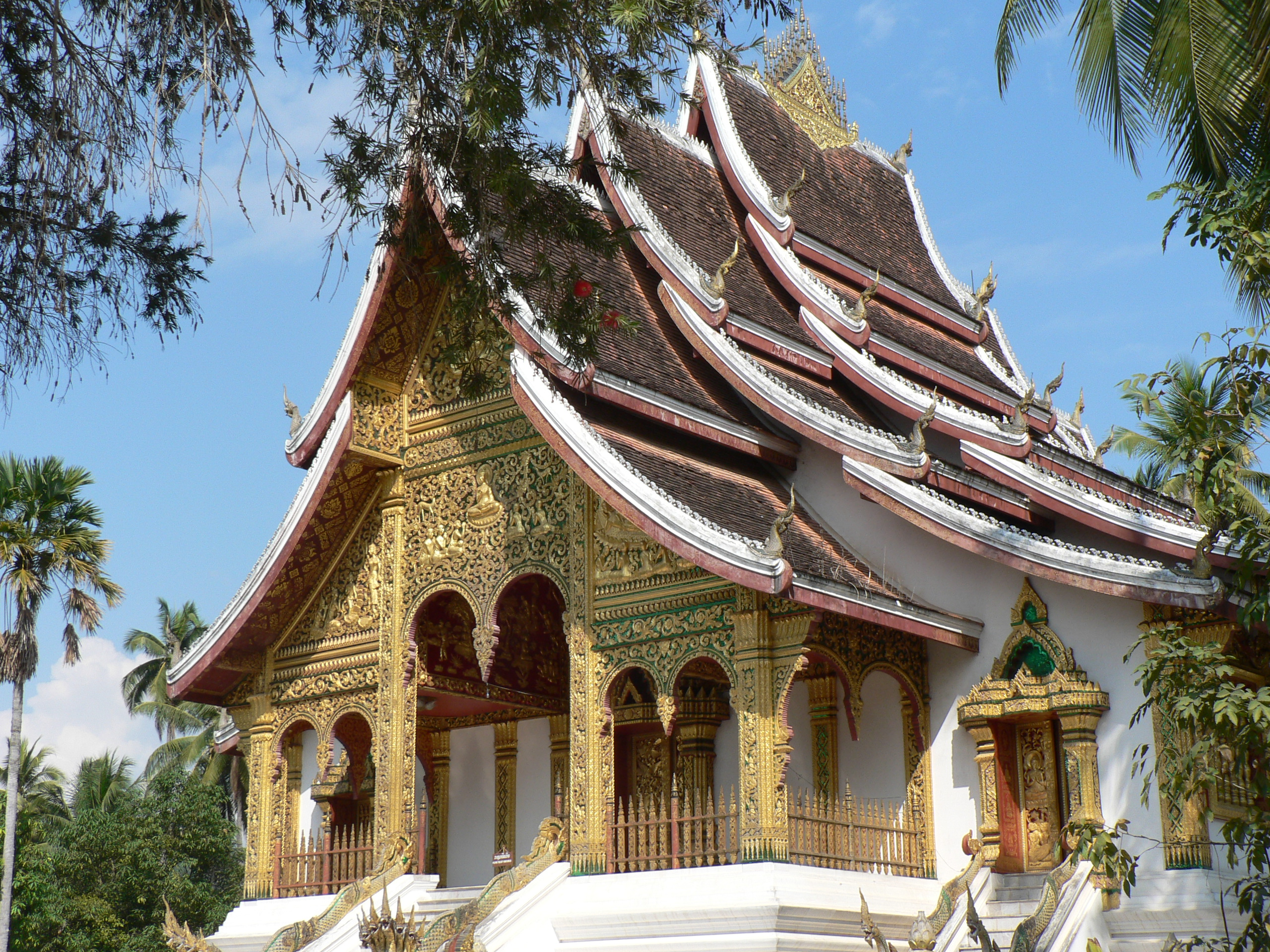
The Buddhist temple at the Royal Palace in Luang Prabang.

Theravada Buddhism is by far the most prominent organized religion in the country, with nearly 5,000 temples serving as the focus of religious practice as well as the center of community life in rural areas. In most lowland Lao villages, religious tradition remains strong. Most Buddhist men spend some part of their lives as novice monks in temples, even if only for a few days.

There are approximately 22,000 monks in the country, nearly 9,000 of whom have attained the rank of "senior monk", indicating years of study in temples. In addition, there are approximately 450 nuns, generally older women who are widowed, residing in temples throughout the country. The Buddhist Order is under the direction of a Supreme Patriarch who resides in Vientiane and supervises the activities of the order's central office, the Ho Thammasaphat.

Lao Buddhism belongs to the Theravada tradition. Theravada Buddhism is also the dominant school in neighboring Myanmar, Thailand and Cambodia.

That Luang, a Lao-style stupa, is the most sacred Buddhist monument in Laos and the location of the nationally important festival and fair in November.

For the Lao Loum, the Wat is one of the two focal points of village life (the other is the school). The wat provides a symbol of village identity as well as a location for ceremonies and festivals. Prior to the establishment of secular schools, village boys received basic education from monks at the wat. Nearly every lowland village has a wat, and some have two. Minimally, a wat must have a residence building for the monks and novices (vihan), and a main building housing the Buddha statues (sim), which is used for secular village meetings as well as for prayer sessions. Depending on the wealth and contributions of the villagers, the buildings vary from simple wood and bamboo structures to large, ornate brick and concrete edifices decorated with colorful murals and tile roofs shaped to mimic the curve of the naga, the mythical snake or water dragon. An administrative committee made up of respectable elderly men manages the financial and organizational affairs of the wat.

Buddhist ceremonies generally do not mark events in a life- cycle, with the exception of death. Funerals may be quite elaborate if the family can afford it but are rather simple in rural settings. The body lies in a coffin at home for several days, during which monks pray, and a continual stream of visitors pay their respects to the family and share food and drink. After this period, the body is taken in the coffin to a cremation ground and burned, again attended by monks. The ashes are then interred in a small shrine on the wat grounds.

Although officially incorporated into the dominant Mahanikai School of Buddhist Practice after 1975, the Thammayudh School of Buddhism still maintains a following in the country. Abbots and monks of several temples, particularly in Vientiane, reportedly are followers of the Thammayudh School, which places greater emphasis on meditation and discipline.

There are four Mahayana Buddhist temples in Vientiane, two serving the ethnic Vietnamese community and two serving the ethnic Chinese community. Buddhist monks from Vietnam, China, and India have visited these temples freely to conduct services and minister to worshippers. There are at least four large Mahayana Buddhist pagodas in other urban centers and smaller Mahayana temples in villages near the borders of Vietnam and China.

=== Tai folk religion ===
Tai folk religion (Lao: ສາສນາຜີ sasna phi, "religion of the spirits") is an overarching term for the ethnic religions practiced by 30.7% of the population of Laos. These religions are pantheistic and polytheistic, and involve classes of shamans.

The category comprehends traditions of the Lao and other Tai-Kadai people, the Khmu and other Mon-Khmer people, as well as religions of the Hmong–Mien (Hmongism and Yao Taoism), Tibeto-Burman, and other ethnic groups of Laos. Among the Lao, the Lao Loum and Lao Lom are predominantly Buddhist, while the Lao Theung and Lao Sung are predominantly folk religious.

Despite the importance of Buddhism to Lao Loum and some Lao Theung groups, animist beliefs are widespread among all segments of the Lao population. The belief in phi (spirits) colors the relationships of many Lao with nature and community and provides one explanation for illness and disease. Belief in phi is blended with Buddhism, particularly at the village level, and some monks are respected as having particular abilities to exorcise malevolent spirits from a sick person or to keep them out of a house. Many wat have a small spirit hut built in one corner of the grounds that is associated with the phi khoun wat, the beneficent spirit of the monastery.

Phi are ubiquitous and diverse. Some are connected with the universal elements—earth, heaven, fire, and water. Many Lao Loum also believe that they are being protected by khwan (thirty-two spirits). Illness occurs when one or more of these spirits leaves the body; this condition may be reversed by the soukhwan—more commonly called the baci—a ceremony that calls all thirty-two khwan back to bestow health, prosperity, and well-being on the affected participants. Cotton strings are tied around the wrists of the participants to keep the spirits in place. The ceremony is often performed to welcome guests, before and after making long trips, and as a curing ritual or after recovery from an illness; it is also the central ritual in the Lao Loum wedding ceremony and naming ceremony for newborn children.

Many Lao believe that the khwan of persons who die by accident, violence, or in childbirth are not reincarnated, becoming instead phi phetu (malevolent spirits). Animist believers also fear wild spirits of the forests. Other spirits associated with specific places such as the household, the river, or a grove of trees are neither inherently benevolent nor evil. However, occasional offerings ensure their favor and assistance in human affairs. In the past, it was common to perform similar rituals before the beginning of the farming season to ensure the favor of the spirit of the rice. These ceremonies, beginning in the late 1960s, were discouraged by the government as successive areas began to be liberated. This practice had apparently died out by the mid-1980s, at least in the extended area around Vientiane.

Ceremonies oriented to the phi commonly involve an offering of a chicken and rice liquor. Once the phi have taken the spiritual essence of the offering, people may consume the earthly remains. The head of a household or the individual who wants to gain the favor of the spirit usually performs the ritual. In many villages, a person, usually an older man believed to have special knowledge of the phi, may be asked to choose an auspicious day for weddings or other important events, or for household rites. Each lowland village believes itself protected by the phi ban, which requires an annual offering to ensure the continued prosperity of the village. The village spirit specialist presides over this major ritual, which in the past often involved the sacrifice of a water buffalo and is still an occasion for closing the village to any outsiders for a day. To Hang phi ban (feed the village spirit) also serves an important social function by reaffirming the village boundaries and the shared interests of all villagers.

Most Lao Theung and Lao Sung ethnic groups are animists, for whom a cult of the ancestors is also important, although each group has different practices and beliefs. The Kammu call spirits hrooy, and they are similar to the phi of the Lao Loum; the house spirit is particularly important, and spirits of wild places are to be avoided or barred from the village. Lamet have similar beliefs, and each village must have one spirit practitioner (xemia), who is responsible for making all the sacrifices to village spirits. He also supervises the men's communal house and officiates at the construction of any new houses. When a spirit practitioner dies, one of his sons is elected by the married men of the village to be his successor. If he has none, one of his brother's sons is chosen. Ancestor spirits (mbrong n'a) are very important to the Lamet because they look out for the well-being of the entire household. They live in the house, and no activity is undertaken without informing them of it. Ancestor spirits are fond of buffalos; thus buffalo skulls or horns from sacrifices are hung at the altar of the ancestors or under the gable of the house. Numerous taboos regarding behavior in the house are observed to avoid offending ancestral spirits.

Hmong also believe in a variety of spirits (neeb), some associated with the house, some with nature, and some with ancestors. Every house has at least a small altar on one wall, which is the center of any ritual related to the household or its members. Annual ceremonies at Hmong New Year renew the general protection of the household and ancestral spirits. The spirit of the door is important to household well-being and is the object of another annual ceremony and sacrifice. As with other Lao groups, illness is frequently attributed to the action of spirits, and spirit practitioners are called to carry out curing rites. Two classes exist: ordinary practitioners and shamans. Ordinary priests or the household head conduct the household ceremonies and ordinary divinations. The shaman may be called on to engage in significant curing rituals.

According to Hmong belief, spirits reside in the sky, and the shaman can climb a ladder to the heavens on his magical horse and contact the spirits there. Sometimes illness is caused by one's soul climbing the steps to the sky, and the shaman must climb after it, locate it, and bring it back to the body in order to effect a cure. During the ritual, the shaman sits in front of the altar astride a wooden bench, which becomes his or her horse. A black cloth headpiece covers vision of the present world, and as the shaman chants and enters a trance, he or she begins to shake and may stand on the bench or move, mimicking the process of climbing to heaven. The chant evokes the shaman's search and the negotiations with the heavenly spirits for a cure or for information about the family's fortune.

Hmong shamans are believed to be chosen by the spirits, usually after a serious or prolonged illness. The illness would be diagnosed by another shaman as an initiatory illness and confrontation with death, which was caused by the spirits. Both men and women can be summoned in this way by the spirits to be shamans. After recovery from the illness, the newly chosen shaman begins a period of study with a master shaman, which may last two or three years, during which time he or she learns the chants, techniques, and procedures of shamanic rites, as well as the names and natures of all the spirits that can bring fortune or suffering to people. Because the tradition is passed orally, there is no uniform technique or ritual; rather, it varies within a general framework according to the practice of each master and apprentice.

=== Christianity ===
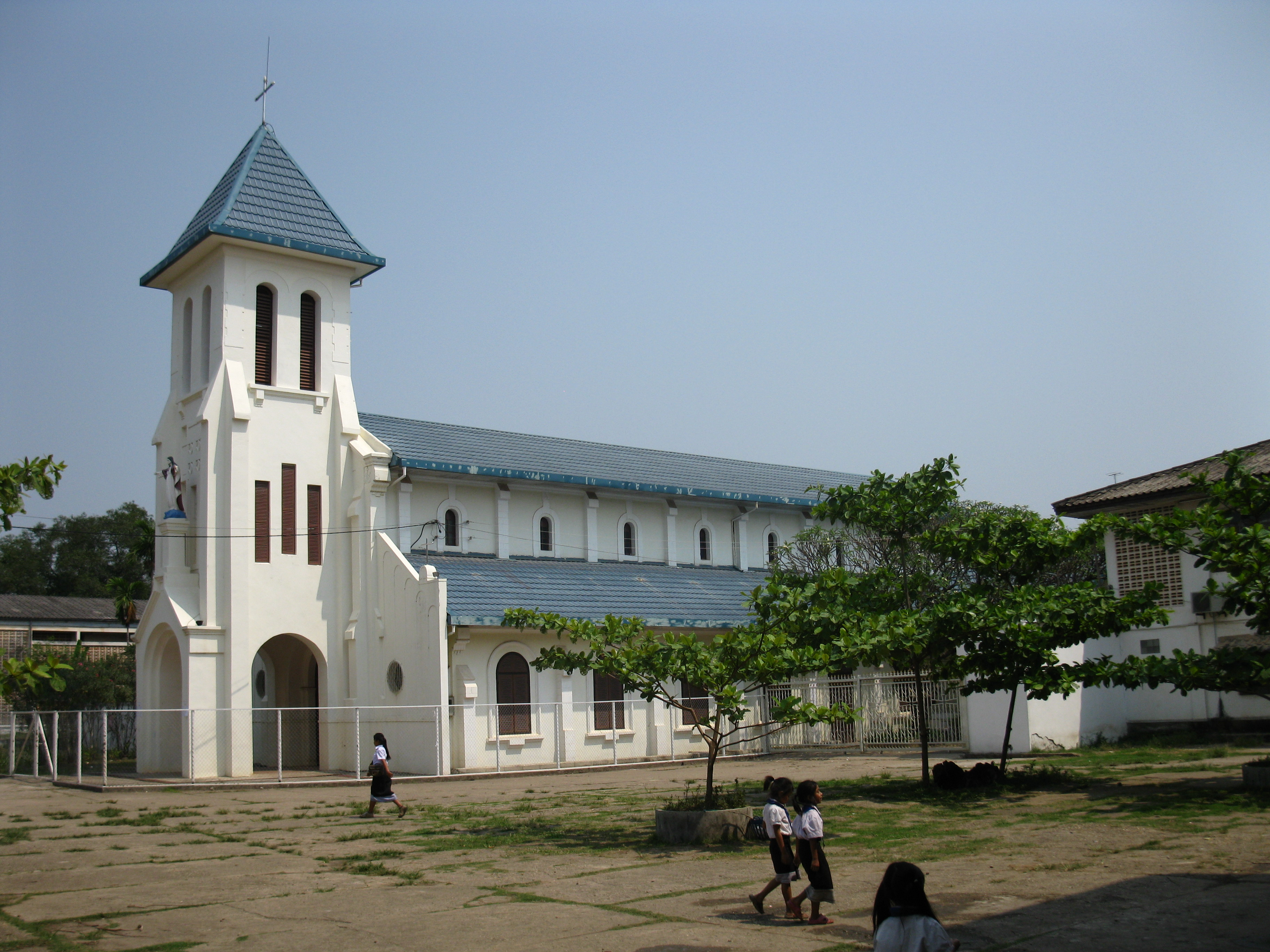
The Sacre Coeur Catholic Church in Vientiane was built in 1928

Christianity is a minority religion in Laos. There are three recognized churches in Laos: the Roman Catholic Church, the Seventh-day Adventist Church, and the Lao Evangelical Church.

There are approximately 45,000 members of the Catholic Church, many of whom are ethnic Vietnamese, concentrated in major urban centers and surrounding areas along the Mekong River in the central and southern regions of the country. Catholicism is an established presence in five of the most populous central and southern provinces, and Catholics are able to worship openly. The church's activities are more circumscribed in the north. Church property in Luang Prabang was seized after 1975, and there is no longer a parsonage in that city. An informal Catholic training center in Thakhek prepared a small number of priests to serve the Catholic community.

Approximately 400 Protestant congregations conduct services throughout the country for a community that grew rapidly in the period from 1997 to 2007. Church officials estimate Protestants to number as many as 100,000. Many Protestants are members of ethnic Mon-Khmer groups, especially the Khmu in the north and the Brou in the central provinces. Numbers of Protestants also have expanded rapidly in the Hmong and Yao communities.

In urban areas, Protestantism has attracted many lowland Lao followers. Most Protestants are concentrated in Vientiane Municipality, in the provinces of Vientiane, Sayaboury, Luang Prabang, Xieng Khouang, Bolikhamsai, Savannakhet, Champassak, and Attapeu, as well as in the former Saisomboun Special Zone, but smaller congregations are located throughout the country. The LFNC officially recognizes only two Protestant groups - the Lao Evangelical Church and the Seventh-day Adventist Church - and requires all non-Catholic Christian groups to operate under one of these organizations.

Seventh-day Adventists number slightly more than 1,000 country-wide, with congregations in Vientiane Municipality as well as Bokeo, Bolikhamsai, Champassak, Luang Prabang, and Xieng Khouang provinces. Christian denominations that have some following in the country, but which are not recognized by the government, include the Methodists, Jehovah’s Witnesses, Church of Christ, Assemblies of God, Lutherans, Church of Jesus Christ of Latter-day Saints (Mormons), and Baptists. Official membership numbers are not available.

=== Islam ===
There are approximately 1,650 adherents of Islam in the country, the vast majority of whom are foreign permanent residents of South Asian (Pakistani, Indian and Cambodian (Cham)) origin. There are two active mosques in Vientiane.

=== Other religions ===
The Baha'i Faith has approximately 8,000 adherents and four centers: two in Vientiane Municipality, one in Vientiane Province, and one in Savannakhet Province. A small number of Baha'i also live in Khammouane Province and in Pakse City. Small groups of followers of Confucianism and Taoism practice their beliefs in the larger cities. Laos used to be part of the Khmer Empire and has some remaining Hindu temples. State Shinto was imposed during the Japanese Occupation of Laos.

== Demographics ==
According to the 2015 national census, 64.7 percent of the population is Buddhist, 1.7 percent is Christian, 31.4 percent report having “no religion” (a category which includes those with animist beliefs, who do not fit into other categories), and the remaining 2.1 percent belong to other religions or did not state an answer.

== See also ==
- Buddhism in Laos
- Phra Bang
- That Luang Festival
- Satsana Phi
- Islam in Laos
- Baha'i in Laos

== Works cited ==
- Savada, Andrea Matles, ed. (1995). Laos: a country study (3rd ed.). Washington, D.C.: Federal Research Division, Library of Congress. ISBN 0-8444-0832-8. OCLC 32394600. This article incorporates text from this source, which is in the public domain.
