= Louis-Marie Ling Mangkhanekhoun =

Laotian prelate of the Catholic Church (born 1944)

His Eminence Louis-Marie Ling Mangkhanekhoun IVD
- Vicar Apostolic of Vientiane
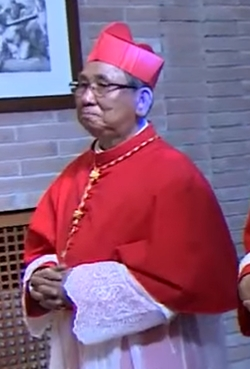
- Mangkhanekhoun, 28 June 2017
- Church: Roman Catholic Church
- See: Vientiane
- Appointed: 16 December 2017
- Term ended: 23 December 2024
- Predecessor: Jean Khamsé Vithavong
- Successor: Anthony Adoun Hongsaphong
- Other post: Cardinal-Priest of San Silvestro in Capite (2017–present)
- Previous posts: Vicar Apostolic of Paksé (2000–17); Titular Bishop of Aquae Novae in Proconsulari (2000–17)

Orders
- Ordination: 5 November 1972
- Consecration: 22 April 2001 by Jean Khamsé Vitahavong
- Created cardinal: 28 June 2017 by Pope Francis
- Rank: Cardinal-Priest

Personal details
- Born: Louis-Marie Ling Mangkhanekhoun; 8 April 1944 (age 82) Bonha-Louang, Laos
- Motto: Totus tuus
- Coat of arms

Louis-Marie Ling Mangkhanekhoun, IVD (born 8 April 1944) is a Laotian prelate of the Catholic Church. A bishop since 2001, he was made a cardinal on 28 June 2017 and served as the Vicar Apostolic of Vientiane since December 2017 until December 2024. He is the first cardinal from Laos.

He speaks Khmu, Lao, French, and English. He is sometimes referred to as Bishop or Cardinal Ling, though his last name is Mangkhanekhoun.

== Biography ==
He was born Ling Mangkhanekhoun was born on 8 April 1944 in Bonha-Louang in Xiangkhouang province in northeastern Laos. He is an ethnic Khmu. He was baptized in 1952 after his widowed mother became a Catholic. He received his religious instruction from French Oblate Missionaries. In the 1960s he was sent by the Oblates as the first Laotian to study philosophy and theology at the Voluntas Dei seminary in the Diocese of Edmundston, New Brunswick, Canada. He was ordained a priest in a hurried ceremony in a refugee camp on 5 November 1972 for the Apostolic Vicariate of Vientiane, Laos. He spent the years 1984 to 1987 in prison.

He is a member of Institut Voluntas Dei, founded in 1958 at Trois-Rivières, Quebec. He took his first name Louis-Marie from its founder, Fr. Louis-Marie Parent.

He worked as a priest in the Vicariate of Vientiane for more than 25 years, more than a decade of that time in rural areas, and became its vicar general. On 30 October 2000, Pope John Paul II appointed him Vicar Apostolic of Paksé and titular bishop of Aquae Novae in Proconsulari. He was consecrated a bishop on 22 April 2001 by Bishop Jean Khamsé Vithavong, Vicar Apostolic of Vientiane.

He developed a system of seminary education that requires a candidate for the priesthood, after three years of study, to spend one to three years in pastoral work. He explained that they are "catechists, carrying medicines, aid, prayers for the people of the mountain. They integrate with the villagers, live as the villagers do in everything." His other principal charges as a bishop in Laos have been providing formation for Laotian priests, since the government does not allow foreign missionaries to work there, and planning for his own successor.

He was president of the Episcopal Conference of Laos and Cambodia from 2009 to 2014.

On 11 December 2016, his cousin was declared a blessed in the Catholic Church, Blessed Luc Sy (1938–1970), one of the Martyrs of Laos.

On 2 February 2017, Pope Francis gave him the additional responsibilities of apostolic administrator of the Apostolic Vicariate of Vientiane.

On 21 May 2017, Pope Francis announced his intention to make Mangkhanekhoun a cardinal. He was made a cardinal at a consistory on 28 June 2017, the first from Laos. With the rank of cardinal-priest, he was assigned the title of San Silvestro in Capite. On 4 October Pope Francis made him a member of the Congregation for the Evangelisation of Peoples.

On 16 December 2017, Pope Francis named him Vicar Apostolic of Vientiane. Francis made him a member of the Dicastery for Promoting Integral Human Development on 23 December 2017 and of the Pontifical Council for Interreligious Dialogue on 8 July 2020.

Catholic Church titles
| Preceded by Vilmos Dékány | — TITULAR — Titular Bishop of Aquae Novae in Proconsulari; 30 October 2000 – 28 June 2017 | Succeeded by Enrique Delgado |
| Preceded by Thomas Khamphan | Apostolic Vicar of Paksé; 30 October 2000 – 12 December 2017 | Vacant |
| Preceded by Jean Khamsé Vithavong | Apostolic Vicar of Vientiane; 12 December 2017 – present | Incumbent |
| Preceded by Desmond Connell | Cardinal-Priest of San Silvestro in Capite; 28 June 2017 – present | Incumbent |
