= Kaysone Phomvihane (city) =

Kaysone Phomvihane City ເມືອງໄກສອນ ພົມວິຫານ Meuong Kaison Phomvihan
- city and municipality
- Kaysone Phomvihane City
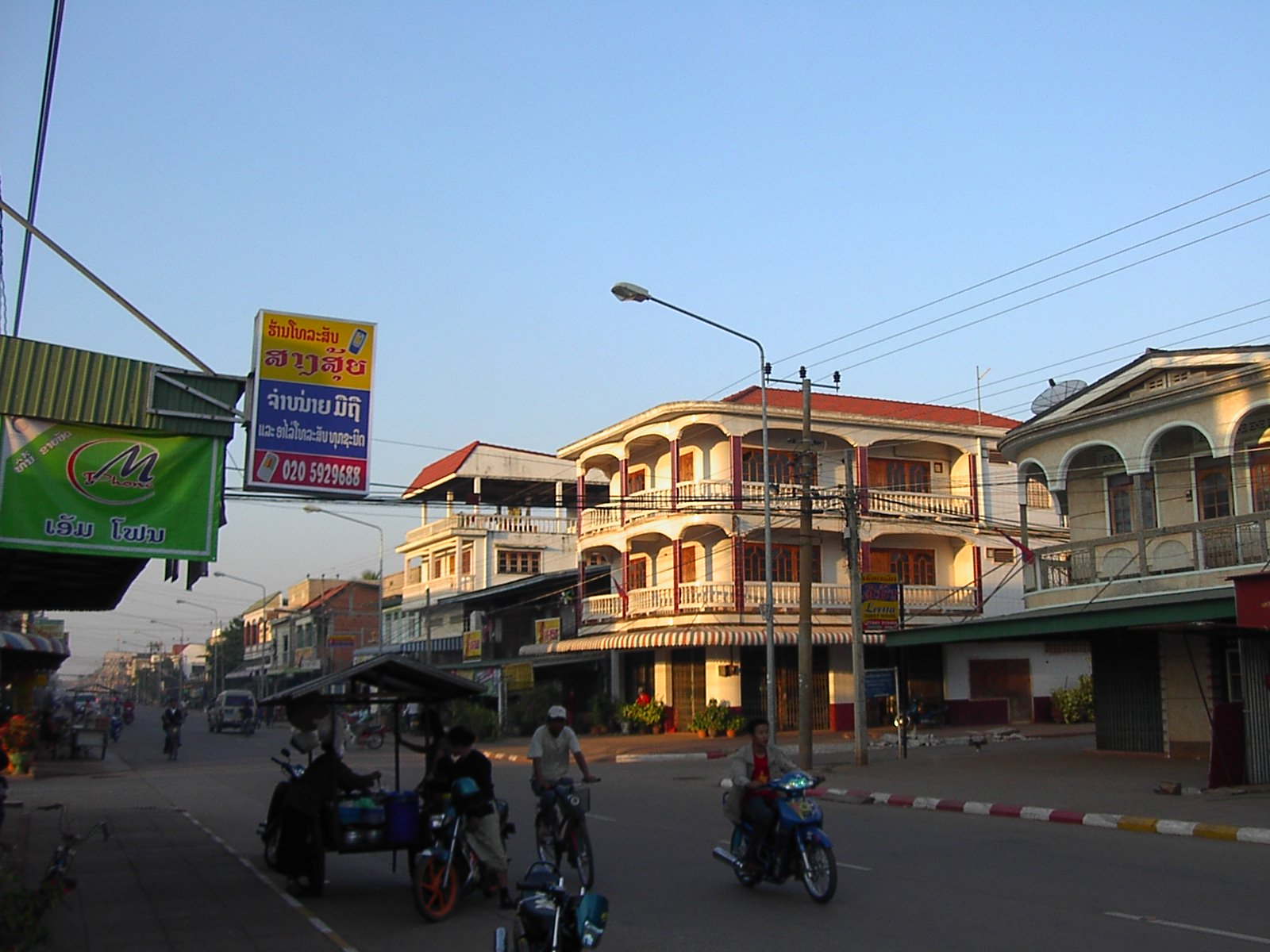
- The commercial centre of Kaysone Phomvihane, Savannakhet Province

- Location within Laos
- Coordinates: 16°33′N 104°45′E
- Country: Laos
- Province: Savannakhet Province

Population (2018)
  - Total: 125,760
- Time zone: UTC+7 (ICT)

Kaysone Phomvihane (Lao: ໄກສອນ ພົມວິຫານ), previously known as Savannakhet (Lao: ສະຫວັນນະເຂດ, pronounced [sā.wǎn.nā(ʔ).kʰȅːt]) and Khanthaboury (Lao: ຄັນທະບູລີ), is a city in western Laos. It is the capital of Savannakhet Province. With a population of 125,760 (2018), it is the second-largest city in Laos, after Vientiane. The annual per capita income of Kaysone Phomvihane City is US$2,041 (2018).

Kaysone Phomvihane has a large 15th-century Buddhist temple, Wat Sainyaphum, a Chinese temple, the Catholic Co-Cathedral of St. Therese and a mosque. The Second Thai–Lao Friendship Bridge over the Mekong connects to Mukdahan Province in Thailand.

== Economy ==
Kaysone Phomvihane is an important commercial center in southern Laos. The Savan-Seno Special Economic Zone (SASEZ) has attracted investment in manufacturing, trade and logistics. The city is home to a branch of the Lao Development Bank (LDB) on Oudomsin Road in Sounantha Village.

== Name change ==
The settlement was formerly called Khanthaboury. Then it became Savannakhet. Its name was changed to Kaysone Phomvihane in 2005, while retaining its status as the provincial capital of Savannakhet Province. The city is the birthplace of Kaysone Phomvihane, the first leader of Laos from 1975 to 1992 after the dissolution of the Kingdom of Laos. In 2018, its status was upgraded to that of a "city". In order to attain city status, a district or municipality must be financially self-sufficient and have a population of at least 60,000 people.

== Transport ==
The Second Thai–Lao Friendship Bridge over the Mekong connects to Thailand's Mukdahan Province. The two-lane, 12-metre-wide (39 ft), 1,600-metre-long (5,250 ft) bridge opened in 2007.

The city is served by Savannakhet Airport.

== Climate ==
Savannakhet features a tropical savanna climate (Aw) according to the Köppen climate classification.

Climate data for Savannakhet (1991-2020)
Month	Jan	Feb	Mar	Apr	May	Jun	Jul	Aug	Sep	Oct	Nov	Dec	Year
Record high °C (°F)	38.5 (101.3)	39.5 (103.1)	42.0 (107.6)	41.5 (106.7)	41.2 (106.2)	38.0 (100.4)	38.5 (101.3)	36.3 (97.3)	36.3 (97.3)	36.0 (96.8)	36.5 (97.7)	38.0 (100.4)	42.0 (107.6)
Mean daily maximum °C (°F)	29.7 (85.5)	31.8 (89.2)	34.2 (93.6)	35.1 (95.2)	33.9 (93.0)	32.5 (90.5)	31.2 (88.2)	30.9 (87.6)	31.4 (88.5)	31.1 (88.0)	31.2 (88.2)	28.6 (83.5)	31.7 (89.1)
Daily mean °C (°F)	22.2 (72.0)	24.4 (75.9)	27.4 (81.3)	29.0 (84.2)	28.8 (83.8)	28.4 (83.1)	27.4 (81.3)	27.2 (81.0)	27.3 (81.1)	26.1 (79.0)	24.3 (75.7)	21.9 (71.4)	26.2 (79.2)
Mean daily minimum °C (°F)	15.8 (60.4)	17.9 (64.2)	21.7 (71.1)	24.1 (75.4)	25.0 (77.0)	25.3 (77.5)	24.6 (76.3)	24.5 (76.1)	24.2 (75.6)	22.0 (71.6)	19.2 (66.6)	16.2 (61.2)	21.7 (71.1)
Record low °C (°F)	5.8 (42.4)	9.0 (48.2)	10.0 (50.0)	15.0 (59.0)	17.5 (63.5)	19.0 (66.2)	18.2 (64.8)	18.0 (64.4)	18.0 (64.4)	12.0 (53.6)	8.5 (47.3)	7.0 (44.6)	5.8 (42.4)
Average precipitation mm (inches)	3.3 (0.13)	19.3 (0.76)	40.6 (1.60)	69.3 (2.73)	206.2 (8.12)	216.5 (8.52)	307.1 (12.09)	333.9 (13.15)	239.3 (9.42)	74.2 (2.92)	7.3 (0.29)	4.0 (0.16)	1,521 (59.88)
Average precipitation days (≥ 1.0 mm)	1	2	4	6	13	14	18	19	15	7	2	1	100
Average relative humidity (%)	69	68	65	67	75	78	80	83	81	76	72	70	73.7
Mean monthly sunshine hours	246.8	222.4	225.6	217.4	191.2	165.0	142.1	115.9	154.6	202.8	225.3	236.9	2,345.9
Source 1: NOAA (humidity, 1961-1990 and extremes)
Source 2: The Yearbook of Indochina (1932-1933)

== Gallery ==
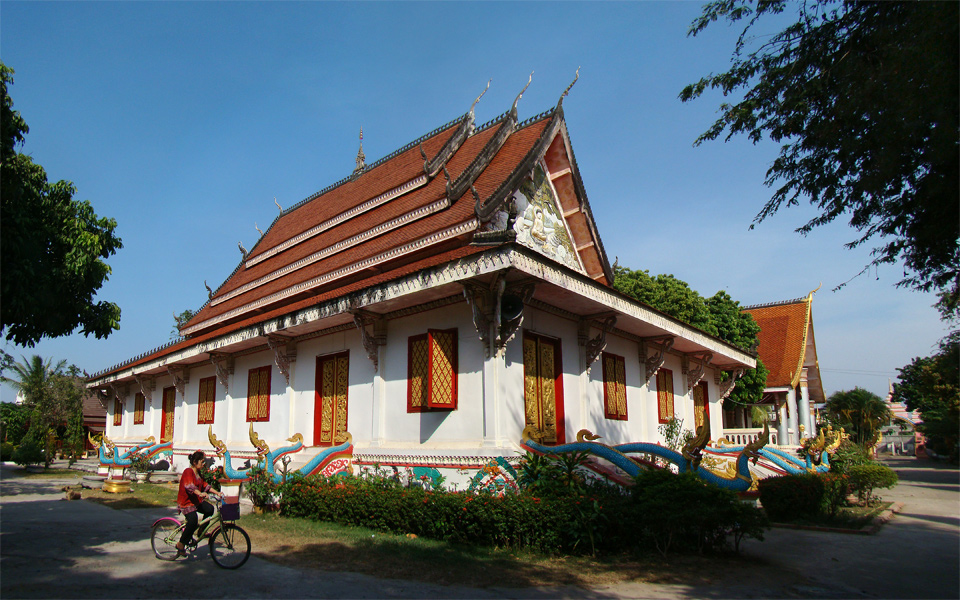
Wat Sainyaphum

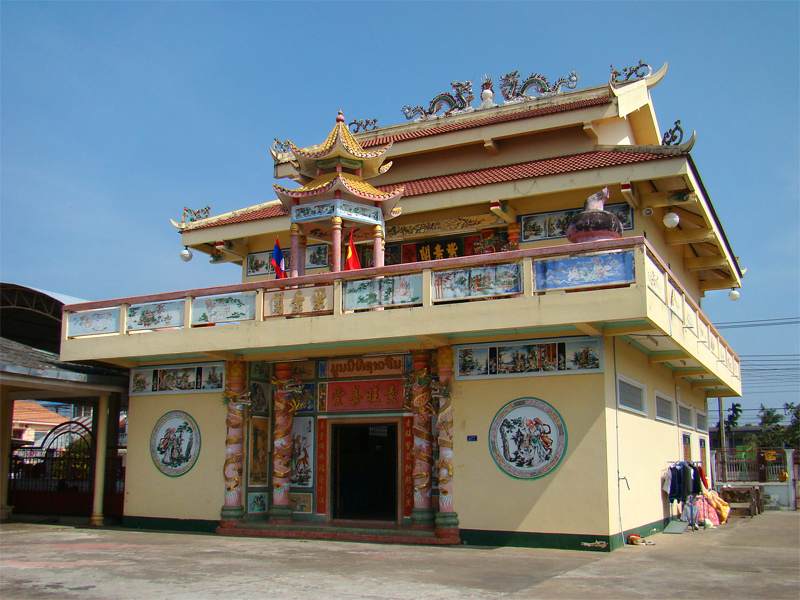
Chinese Buddhist Temple

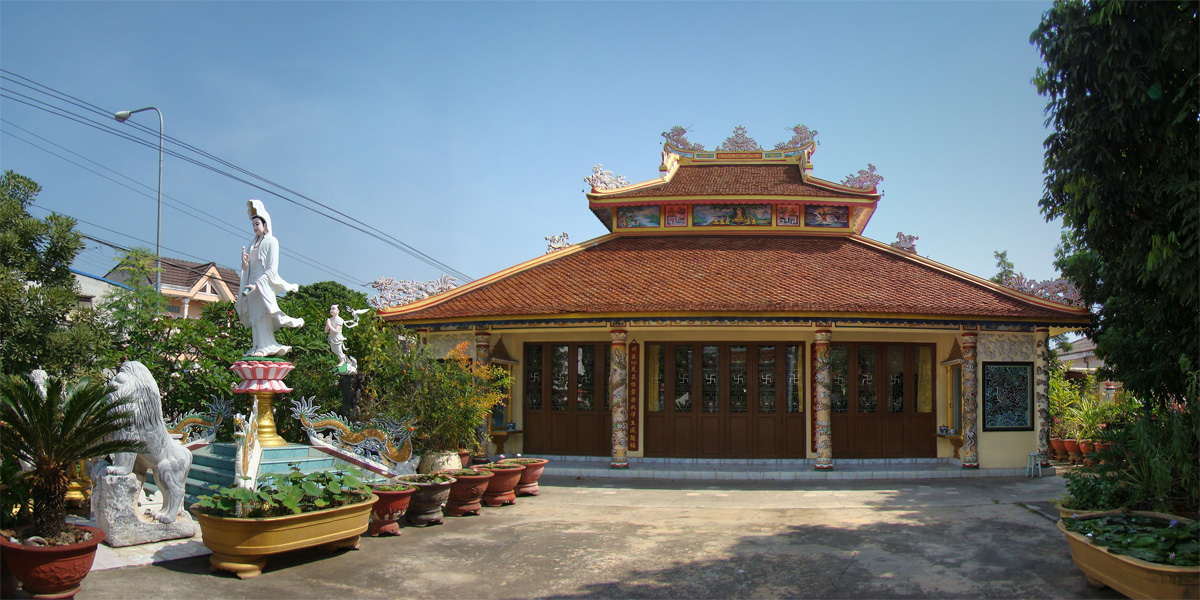
Vietnamese Buddhist Temple Diệu Giác

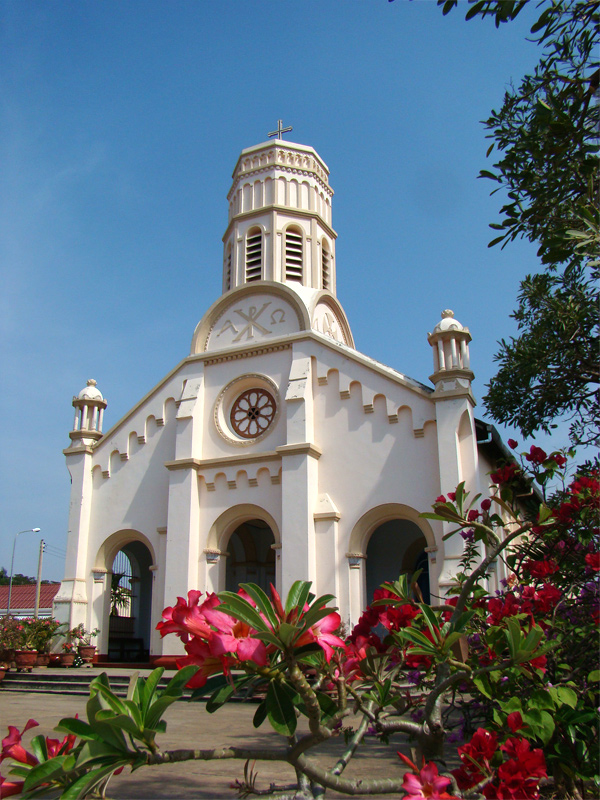
St. Teresa's Catholic Church
