= 1951 in Laos =

- Decades: 1930s; 1940s; 1950s; 1960s; 1970s
- See also: Other events of 1951; List of years in Laos

The following lists events that happened during 1951 in Laos.

== Incumbents ==
- Monarch: Sisavang Vong
- Prime Minister:
  - until 15 October: Phoui Sananikone
  - 15 October-21 November: Savang Vatthana
  - starting 21 November: Souvanna Phouma

== Events ==
=== August ===
- 18 August — The National Progressive Party wins 19 out of 39 seats in the Parliament of Laos in the 1951 Laotian parliamentary election.

=== November ===
- 13 November — The first postage stamps of Laos are issued.

=== Births ===
- date unknown - Pany Yathotou
