= Operation Snake Eyes =

- Part of Laotian Civil War
- Operational scope: Strategic offensive
- Planned: December 1969
- Planned by: G. McMurtrie Godley
- Commanded by: Xieng Manh Noy Sirisouk
- Objective: Capture and block the extension of Route 46
- Outcome: Aborted

Operation Snake Eyes was a proposed military operation of the Laotian Civil War. Planned in mid-December 1969 by the U.S. Ambassador to Laos, the planned interdiction of the newly constructed Chinese Road, Route 46, was aimed at halting the road's progress toward the border with Thailand. The offensive by guerrilla raiders was delayed six months for operational reasons. When it was finally ready to be launched, it was pre-empted by the furor caused by the Cambodian Incursion. Fearful that Operation Snake Eyes would arouse even greater publicity, the Central Intelligence Agency handlers of the guerrillas canceled the operation on orders of the White House. Attempts to limit Chinese expansion toward the south would be left to future operations, such as Operation Phalat and Operation Sourisak Montry.

== Overview ==
The Kingdom of Laos was freed by the French at the end of the First Indochina War. From its inception, Laos was troubled by a communist insurrection. The United States stepped in to provide foreign aid to Laos, to aid in quelling the uprising.

In March 1961, the Geneva Conference of 1954 reconvened with wider participation to reconsider the neutralization of the Kingdom of Laos. Since the 1954 Agreement was signed, a Pathet Lao insurgency had burgeoned, threatening the national sovereignty. This would eventually result in an attempt to settle the Laotian Civil War, the International Agreement on the Neutrality of Laos signed on 23 July 1962.

Prime Minister Souvanna Phouma curried favor with the People's Republic of China by striking a road construction deal with them in January 1962. The Chinese government committed to building a network of roads connecting Yunnan Province with northern Laos despite the developing Laotian Civil War. At the time the agreement was announced, the Battle of Luang Namtha was being fought on the Lao/Chinese border to spark the Laotian Civil War.

== Background ==
The Chinese originally built a road across northern Phongsali Province in 1962 and 1963 as a foreign aid project. They then began an entirely new road construction project in early 1966, extending south from Yunnan Province past Luang Namtha, down the Pakbeng Valley. As Route 46, the new road gathered ever more attention the further south it progressed. The Royal Thai Government worried it might be extended across trackless northwestern Laos to the Thai border. The presence of 25,000 Chinese troops and 400 antiaircraft guns along the new road raised anxiety not only in the Thai and Lao governments, but also in Washington. The American government had a vested interest in Thailand; the Kingdom was a major American supporter in the ongoing Vietnam War.

== Operation ==
In mid-December 1969, U.S. Ambassador G. McMurtrie Godley had suggested that the Central Intelligence Agency's guerrilla forces might block Route 46. Three guerrillas platoons from Nam Yu were infiltrated 50 kilometers south of Luang Namtha to spy on the road construction; they were dubbed Teams 37A, 37B, and 37C. Even though Godley was in charge of all U.S. military and paramilitary activity in the Secret War, his aggressive suggestion was rejected in Washington. He countered with a plan to scale the suggested Operation Snake Eyes back to a passive road watch program spying on Chinese activities. His argument for the operation was that if the U.S. did not take action to support its allies in the war, they might act unilaterally. In January 1970, as the road watch proposal was being bruited about in Washington, two Thai mercenary pilots of the Royal Lao Air Force bombed a Chinese convoy on Route 46, destroying 15 trucks.

A week later, in response to the Thai bombing, the original Snake Eyes proposal to block Route 46 was approved, but with one proviso: Laotian Prime Minister Souvanna Phouma would have to cease waffling and publicly oppose the road construction to give justification for the attack.

As events turned out, Operation Snake Eyes was put on hold for six months so that it would begin in the rainy season against a skeleton crew of Chinese workers. It would be supported by the Royal Thai Air Force. CIA-sponsored hill tribes road watch teams augmented by Chinese Nationalists from nearby Burma would spy on the builders in the meantime. In the meantime, a company of Commando Raiders was recruited in Luang Prabang and trained to monitor the road. They took up road watch duties in June 1970.

When the time rolled around to stage Operation Snake Eyes, two separate guerrilla units were poised for a pincer movement. The Nam Yu contingent already had the three teams in place, and would push southeast to join them. A second unit would move west from the direction of Luang Prabang, under the command of Captain Xieng Manh Noy Sirisouk. When Operation Snake Eyes was again scheduled, the Cambodian Incursion intervened. There was such public furor over that invasion that the White House decided not to risk further publicity by staging Snake Eyes.

After all this hesitation, Sirisouk was primed for combat. He was disgusted with the latest postponement order, angry at his CIA advisor, and refused to return the unit's weapons to the adviser. He marched his troops on the royal capital of Luang Prabang, then veered off short to cross the Mekong River and encamp them on an obscure mountaintop. Operation Snake Eyes ended when Captain Sirisouk quit the Laotian Civil War because of the White House order.

== Aftermath ==
The failure to launch Operation Snake Eyes to check Route 46's extension south led to the later necessity for operations to defend the Thai border, such as Operation Phalat and Operation Sourisak Montry.
