= 1950 in Laos =

- Decades: 1930s; 1940s; 1950s; 1960s; 1970s
- See also: Other events of 1950; List of years in Laos

The following lists events that happened during 1950 in Laos.

== Incumbents ==
- Monarch: Sisavang Vong
- Prime Minister: Boun Oum (until 24 February), Phoui Sananikone (starting 24 February)

== Events ==
=== August ===
- 16 August - Prince Souphanouvong joins the Viet Minh in Hanoi and becomes the leader of the Pathet Lao.
