= Team Sone Pet =

- Part of Laotian Civil War, Vietnam War
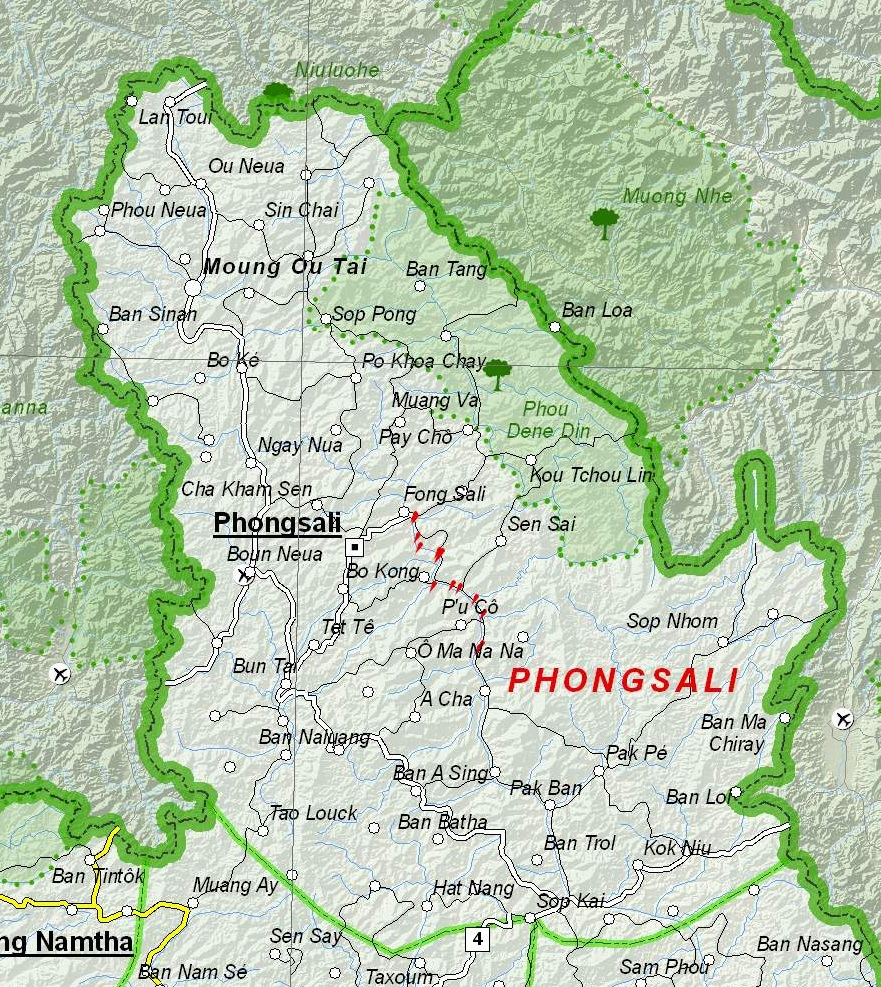
- Map of Phongsaly Province, Laos, the target into which the mission was launched
- Type: Covert military intelligence mission
- Location: Phongsaly Province, Laos and Yunnan Province, China; Ban Khwan, Laos
- Planned: Late 1967
- Planned by: (Kingdom of Laos) Ouane Rattikone (Taiwan) Republic of China (United States) CIA
- Commanded by: A Royal Lao Army (RLA) officer Ouane Rattikone
- Objective: Spy on activities by Chinese Communists
- Date: Late 1967 and 1968
- Executed by: (Kingdom of Laos) Royal Lao Army (RLA) (Kingdom of Laos) Royal Lao Air Force (United States) CIA (Taiwan) Kuomintang agents
- Outcome: The first mission by RLA agents is successful at intelligence gathering for two months. Agents then discovered by a patrol and airlifted out. Subsequent missions by Kuomintang agents fail after radio contact was lost.

Team Sone Pet (Diamond Arrow) was the code name for a spying foray directed against the People's Republic of China in 1967 and 1968. This classified military operation in the Kingdom of Laos during the Laotian Civil War was an infiltration of spies into Yunnan Province of the People's Republic of China. The operation was run jointly by Lao General Ouane Rattikone and the Republic of China, using an espionage team recruited by the American Central Intelligence Agency. The first mission in 1967 was successful; however, the second mission in 1968 disappeared.

== Overview ==
In the words of a CIA analyst, there was a "farrago of regular and irregular formations combined to make northwest Laos a political, ethnic, and military stew that defied management or even description." The Battle of Luang Namtha early in the Laotian Civil War ended with communists in military control of the northwest by May 1962. That same year, CIA operative William Young established a base for Hmong and Yao guerrillas in Nam Yu, Laos. Still another local event in 1962 was the start of Chinese construction of an all-season highway from Yunnan Province southwards through northwestern Laos.

Phongsali Province's location in northwestern Laos, lies between Yunnan Province of China and the Democratic Republic of Vietnam. Team Sone Pet would be launched into Phongsali Province.

== The Sone Pet operation ==
Laotian General Ouane Rattikone had contacts with the military establishment of the Republic of China. In conjunction with the Nationalist Chinese, Ouane decided to exploit these links for military intelligence purposes. In late 1967, with the cooperation of the Central Intelligence Agency a reconnaissance team of eight local espionage agents was recruited to spy on the Chinese communists. While the Team Sone Pet leader was a Royal Lao Army officer, the seven members were from General Khoumouane Boupha's troops in Phongsaly Province. This team was hired by the CIA and paradropped into extreme northern Laos in familiar territory very near the Chinese communist border. Once landed near Malitao, they spied undetected for over two months before bumping into a communist patrol. They were then exfiltrated by a Royal Lao Air Force H-34 helicopter.

Following this, during 1968 Ouane allowed a Nationalist Chinese intelligence team (name unknown) to set up in Ban Khwan, Laos, the battlefield of the July 1967 Opium War. Also during Spring 1968, the Diamond Arrow operation was repeated in Phongsaly, using a team of Nationalist Chinese imported from Taiwan. Shortly after this second team landed in the same locality as the first, they lost radio contact with their handlers and vanished.
