= 1949 in Laos =

- Decades: 1930s; 1940s; 1950s; 1960s
- See also: Other events of 1949; List of years in Laos

The following lists events that happened during 1949 in Laos.

== Incumbents ==
- Monarch: Sisavang Vong
- Prime Minister: Boun Oum (starting 25 March)

== Events ==
=== July ===
- 1 July - The Royal Lao Army is founded to defend against Viet Minh attacks.
