= 1961 in Laos =

- Decades: 1940s; 1950s; 1960s; 1970s; 1980s
- See also: Other events of 1961; List of years in Laos

The following lists events that happened during 1961 in Laos.

== Incumbents ==
- Monarch: Savang Vatthana
- Prime Minister: Boun Oum

== Events ==
- 31 January-6 June - Battle of Ban Pa Dong

=== January ===
- January - The Battle of Luang Namtha begins.

=== April ===
- 19 April - Project Hotfoot (Laos) ends.

=== March ===
- 13 March - Operation Millpond begins.

=== December ===
- 13 December - Operation Pincushion begins.
