= 2004 in Laos =

- Decades: 1980s; 1990s; 2000s; 2010s; 2020s
- See also: Other events of 2004; List of years in Laos

The following lists events that happened during 2004 in Laos.

== Incumbents ==
- President: Khamtai Siphandon
- Vice President: Choummaly Sayasone
- Prime Minister: Bounnhang Vorachith

== Events ==
- April - Tham Pha cave is discovered by a farmer.
