= Friendship Highway =

There are several highways sometimes known as Friendship highways. Note that the "friendship" name may not in all cases necessarily be the current official name or common name.

- China-Laos Friendship Highway, 1963 (Chinese 中老友谊公路)
- China-Nepal Friendship Highway, 1967 (Chinese 中尼友谊公路), highway connecting the Chinese Tibet Autonomous Region with Nepal
- China-Pakistan Friendship Highway (Chinese 中巴友誼公路), better known as the Karakoram Highway
- China-Vietnam Friendship Highway (Chinese 中越友谊公路)
- Mittraphap Road (Thailand Route 2), literally "Friendship Road"
- Khmer-American Friendship Highway (National highway 4), Cambodia
- Philippine-Japan Friendship Highway, Philippines
- Bangladesh-Myanmar Friendship Highway
