= 1990 in Laos =

- Decades: 1970s; 1980s; 1990s; 2000s; 2010s
- See also: Other events of 1990; List of years in Laos

The following lists events that happened during 1990 in Laos.

== Incumbents ==
- President: Souphanouvong
- Prime Minister: Kaysone Phomvihane

== Events ==
- date unknown - The Lao Premier League is established.

== Births ==
- 20 July - Chintana Souksavath, footballer
- 4 October - Phatthana Syvilay, footballer
- 3 November - Kanlaya Sysomvang, footballer
- 23 November - Khamla Pinkeo, footballer
- 2 December - Khamphoumy Hanvilay, footballer
