= 1987 in Laos =

- Decades: 1960s; 1970s; 1980s; 1990s; 2000s
- See also: Other events of 1987; List of years in Laos

The following lists events that happened during 1987 in Laos.

== Incumbents ==
- President: Souphanouvong
- Prime Minister: Kaysone Phomvihane

== Events ==
=== December ===
- December - The Thai–Laotian Border War begins.

== Births ==
- 3 March - Sawatvilay Phimmasone, taekwondo practitioner
- 8 April - Kitsada Thongkhen, footballer
- 30 April - Philaylack Sackpraseuth, athlete
- 1 June - Sengphachan Bounthisanh, footballer
- 23 July - Kovanh Namthavixay, footballer
- 28 October - Saynakhonevieng Phommapanya, footballer
