= Operation Sourisak Montry VIII =

Operation Sourisak Montry
- Part of Laotian Civil War; Vietnam War
Date	September 1971 – 22 June 1972
Location	Along the banks of the Mekong River, in the vicinity of Xieng Lom, Laos
Result	Operation Sourisak Montry: Thai Pyrrhic victory over Pathet Lao; Operation Sourisak Montry VIII: Thai offensive repulsed
Territorial changes	Operation Sourisak Montry: Thai forces temporarily occupy bases on the south bank of the Mekong; Operation Sourisak Montry VIII: Communist Party of Thailand retains control of two Lao villages northwest of Xieng Lom

Belligerents
Thailand; Kingdom of Laos; Supported by United States	(Laos) Pathet Lao; Communist Party of Thailand; Supported by: People's Republic of China

Units involved
Operation Sourisak Montry (Thailand) Three RTA battalions (Thailand) Two 75mm howitzers (Thailand) One Project Unity battalion (Thailand) Thai air support Air America transport support Operation Sourisak Montry VIII (Thailand) 7th Regimental Combat Team (Laos) Thai mercenaries 70 US Special Forces; Air America medevac 22nd Special Operations Squadron	Operation Sourisak Montry; Communist insurgents (Laos) 500 Pathet Lao forces Operation Sourisak Montry VIII; 100 Communist insurgents

Operation Sourisak Montry VIII (September 1971 – 22 June 1972) was a Thai military offensive against an encroaching Chinese Communist presence just north of the Mekong River. Operation Phalat established a base camp at Xieng Lom, Laos, on the southern bank of the Mekong River, and garrisoned it with three Thai mercenary battalions. Operation Sourisak Montry was a series of indecisive skirmishes in the same area, during which the Thais won a Pyrrhic victory over the Pathet Lao in mid-March 1972.

Subsequently, Operation Sourisak Montry VIII in June 1972 attempted to recapture two Lao border villages from Communist forces. The offensive ended poorly, with an Air America civilian pilot killed, an 80-man column pinned down for ten days, and the Thai troops repulsed.

== Overview ==
Prime Minister Souvanna Phouma made a foreign aid pact with the People's Republic of China in January 1962. The Chinese Communists committed to construct roads from Yunnan Province into the Kingdom of Laos. When the Royal Lao Government (RLG) lost the crucial Battle of Nam Bac during the Laotian Civil War, the Chinese began to push their road construction south down the Pakbeng Valley towards Thailand. As the new Route 46 was cleared toward Pakbeng, the Chinese stationed 400 antiaircraft guns and 25,000 troops along it. When the new road hit Pakbeng, only the Mekong River and a strip of Lao territory on the south bank separated the road's end from Thai ground. The Royal Thai Government (RTG) began to worry about the Chinese supplying the Communist Party of Thailand (CPT) or even invading Thailand.

== Background ==
RTG uneasiness about The Chinese Road led them to sponsor a border sweep called Operation Phalat (translated: Mountain Slope). Launched on 2 April 1971, it resulted in the Royal Thai Army (RTA) establishing a forward defensive zone centered on Xieng Lom, Laos. The three battalions of Project Unity troops stationed there during August were dubbed Task Force Rattikone. However, the Thais remained uneasy about their nation's borders.

== Operation Sourisak Montry ==
The Thais then planned a follow-up offensive named after a legendary Thai warrior—Sourisak Montry. In September 1971, three battalions of the RTA recaptured several positions on the south bank of the Mekong opposite Pakbeng. Although these strongholds were on Lao territory rather than Thai, their occupation restored the Mekong's natural geographic divide between Laos and Thailand.

The sector remained quiet for some months. Then, in Spring 1972, the Thais established two new positions on the Mekong's south bank, and emplaced a pair of 75mm howitzers. Communist forces crossed the river and assaulted the new fire bases for six days and seven nights, using new and undetectable plastic land mines. When Air America tried to medevac Thai wounded on 20 March 1972, one of their H-34s was downed 12 kilometers southwest of the siege.

The following day, a Unity battalion was heli-lifted in to secure the Air America helicopter. From that landing zone, they moved northeast and relieved the two besieged trenchworks. The new battalion remained in place until 15 May, when a fresh mercenary battalion replaced them.

The replacement battalion was soon attacked by an estimated 500 Pathet Lao (PL). For seven days, tactical air strikes hit the attacking communists; AC-47 gunships and Thai UH-1M armed helicopters strafed them, and A-1 Skyraiders and T-28 Trojans bombed and rocketed them. The PL finally retreated from the effort. However, the Thais withdrew afterwards because they considered the positions could not be maintained.

== Operation Sourisak Montry VIII ==
In early June 1972, 100 CPT insurgents penetrated into Laos and captured a pair of Lao border villages 45 kilometers northwest of Xieng Lom. A joint response by Thailand and Laos was planned. The Thais committed their 7th Regimental Combat Team (7th RCT); the Lao delegated some of their Thai mercenaries to form two assault columns. However, the pincer movement came apart as the Thais attacked in a prolonged pouring rain. After taking casualties for several days, the 7th RCT unexpectedly retreated. The CPT insurgents then turned their recoilless rifles and mortars on the mercenaries.

One Thai mercenary column withdrew. The CPT managed to surround the other detachment of 80 men. A Special Forces rescue team of 70 was infiltrated from the Mekong, with a 75mm pack howitzer and a 4.2 inch mortar. With indirect fire support from the howitzer and mortar, a medevac was tried on 12 June 1972. The Air America civilian copilot was killed by a bullet in the head, and the medevac aborted.

The Thai mercenaries were trapped for ten days before their rescuers linked up and led them back to the improvised fire base. The Communists followed suit. Both Air America and the U.S. Air Force were loath to attempt an exfiltration because of potential ground fire. At that point, the Thai commander on scene parachuted into the fire base to show there was no ground fire. The 22nd Special Operations Squadron then lifted out troops and guns to end the operation.

== Result ==
The arrival of an entire Chinese regiment at Moung Sai on Route 46 in March 1971 had been a troubling omen. So were several incidents during December 1971 and January 1972, when aircraft flying near the new Route 46 were fired upon by antiaircraft artillery. Though officially not at war with Communist China, the RTG had demonstrated their willingness to defend Thai borders by waging Operations Phalat and Sourisak Montry VIII.
