= 1968 in Laos =

- Decades: 1940s; 1950s; 1960s; 1970s; 1980s
- See also: Other events of 1968; List of years in Laos

The following lists events that happened during 1968 in Laos.

== Incumbents ==
- Monarch: Savang Vatthana
- Prime Minister: Souvanna Phouma

== Events ==
=== January ===
- 13 January - The Battle of Nam Bac ends in a Royal Laotian defeat.
- 23 January - Battle of Ban Houei Sane

=== March ===
- 10-11 March - Battle of Lima Site 85

=== November ===
- 26 November - Operation Pigfat begins.
