= 2022 in Laos =

- Decades: 2000s; 2010s; 2020s
- See also: Other events of 2022; List of years in Laos

Events in the year 2022 in Laos.

== Incumbents ==
Photo	Post	Name
	General Secretary of the Lao People's Revolutionary Party	Thongloun Sisoulith
	President of Laos	Thongloun Sisoulith
	Prime Minister of Laos	Phankham Viphavanh (until 30 December)
	Prime Minister of Laos	Sonexay Siphandone (starting 30 December)

== Events ==
Ongoing — COVID-19 pandemic in Laos

- 7 July – The government of Laos discusses the purchase of oil from sanctions-hit Russia as the country faces oil shortages and is nearing a debt default.
- 29 August – 2022 Laos floods: Recent flash floods caused by heavy rainfall in northern Laos have caused at least 5.6 billion Lao kips in damage.

== Sports ==
- Champasak Province Football Club is founded in Pakse, the team played in Lao League 1, with home games being played at the Champasak Stadium.
- 2022 Lao League
