= Operation Phalat =

Military offensive

- Part of Laotian Civil War; Vietnam War
Date	2 April – 20 August 1971
Location	Laos–Thailand northern border along the Mekong River
Result	Thai victory
Territorial changes	Three Thai battalions established in Laos south of the Mekong

Belligerents
Thailand; Laos	(Laos) Pathet Lao; Communist Party of Thailand

Operation Phalat (2 April–20 August 1971) was a military offensive of the Laotian Civil War aimed at an active defense of the Kingdom of Thailand's northern border with the Kingdom of Laos. Evoked by the approach of The Chinese Road, and despite feeble cooperation from the Royal Lao Government, the Thai military established a three-battalion presence on Lao territory south of the Mekong River as a defense against potential invasion by the People's Republic of China.

== Overview ==
In January 1962, during the beginning of the Laotian Civil War, Prime Minister Souvanna Phouma struck a foreign aid pact with the People's Republic of China (PRC). The Communist Chinese would build roads in northwestern Laos despite the ongoing Laotian Civil War. As part of this project, in the wake of the defeat at Nam Bac on 14 January 1968, Chinese engineers began building Route 46 from Yunnan Province south down the Nam Beng Valley towards Pakbeng, which was located on the Mekong River. As the road construction neared the Thai border, and was guarded by Chinese troops and antiaircraft guns, the Royal Thai Government (RTG) became concerned about the possibility of both a Chinese invasion and Chinese support for the Communist Party of Thailand.

== Background ==
Lao Auto Defense Choc (ADC) militia were stationed in two villages near Route 46, Ban Houei Lao and Ban Moung. During Spring 1971, Pathet Lao (PL) troops associated with the road construction effort drove the ADC militia from these villages. The militiamen fled south across the Mekong River and the Thai border. In turn, the Royal Thai Air Force (RTAF) flew tactical air strike missions to support the reoccupation of those village outposts.

== Activities ==
On 2 April 1971, the Royal Thai Army (RTA) began a three-week-long military offensive sweep along its Mekong River border with the Kingdom of Laos. The Thais deployed an infantry regiment, a paratroop battalion, and two artillery batteries, all supported by tactical air power from the RTAF. As Operation Phalat (Operation Mountain Slope) was scheduled as a joint exercise, Lao artillery and Royal Lao Air Force (RLAF) were pledged by the Royal Lao Government (RLG), but never showed. Some Lao ADC did appear on the Lao side of the boundary. In the event, RTG forces destroyed a CPT insurgent base camp in their territory and cut several infiltration trails across the border.

Though these results were satisfactory to the Thais, they were anxious to extend their defensive zone into the southern edge of Military Region 1. As they already had the Operation Unity program for supplying mercenary "volunteers" to support the RLG on the Plain of Jars, they proposed stationing some of those troops as a blocking force between The Chinese Road and the Thai/Lao border. On 15 June 1971, three battalions of Unity troops were stationed at Xieng Lom, Laos. They were dubbed Task Force Rattikone. Due to their crucial location, they were handpicked from the finest Thai troops, and led by a West Point graduate and seasoned combat veterans of the Vietnam War.

On 20 August 1971, Bataillion Commando 612 (BC 612) swept northwestward to the top of Phou Phine, 19 kilometers from Xieng Lom. Once there, they were bloodied in combat after overcoming ammunition shortages for their mortars and recoilless rifles.

== Result ==
Operation Phalat had succeeded in implanting three Thai battalions in a forward position on Lao soil at Xieng Lom. In the near future, the "mountain slope" would lead to an operation named after a mythical Thai warrior—Operation Sourisak Montry.
