= 1962 in Laos =

- Decades: 1940s; 1950s; 1960s; 1970s; 1980s
- See also: Other events of 1962; List of years in Laos

The following lists events that happened during 1962 in Laos.

== Incumbents ==
- Monarch: Savang Vatthana
- Prime Minister: Boun Oum (until 23 June), Souvanna Phouma (starting 23 June)

== Events ==
=== May ===
- 6 May - Luang Namtha is abandoned by Lao Royal Forces, ending the Battle of Luang Namtha.

=== July ===
- 23 July - The International Agreement on the Neutrality of Laos is signed.

=== September ===
- 10 September - Operation Pincushion ends.

== Deaths ==
- 21 November - Henri Déricourt, former French SOE agent, 53 (b. 1909)
