= 1973 in Laos =

- Decades: 1950s; 1960s; 1970s; 1980s; 1990s
- See also: Other events of 1973; List of years in Laos

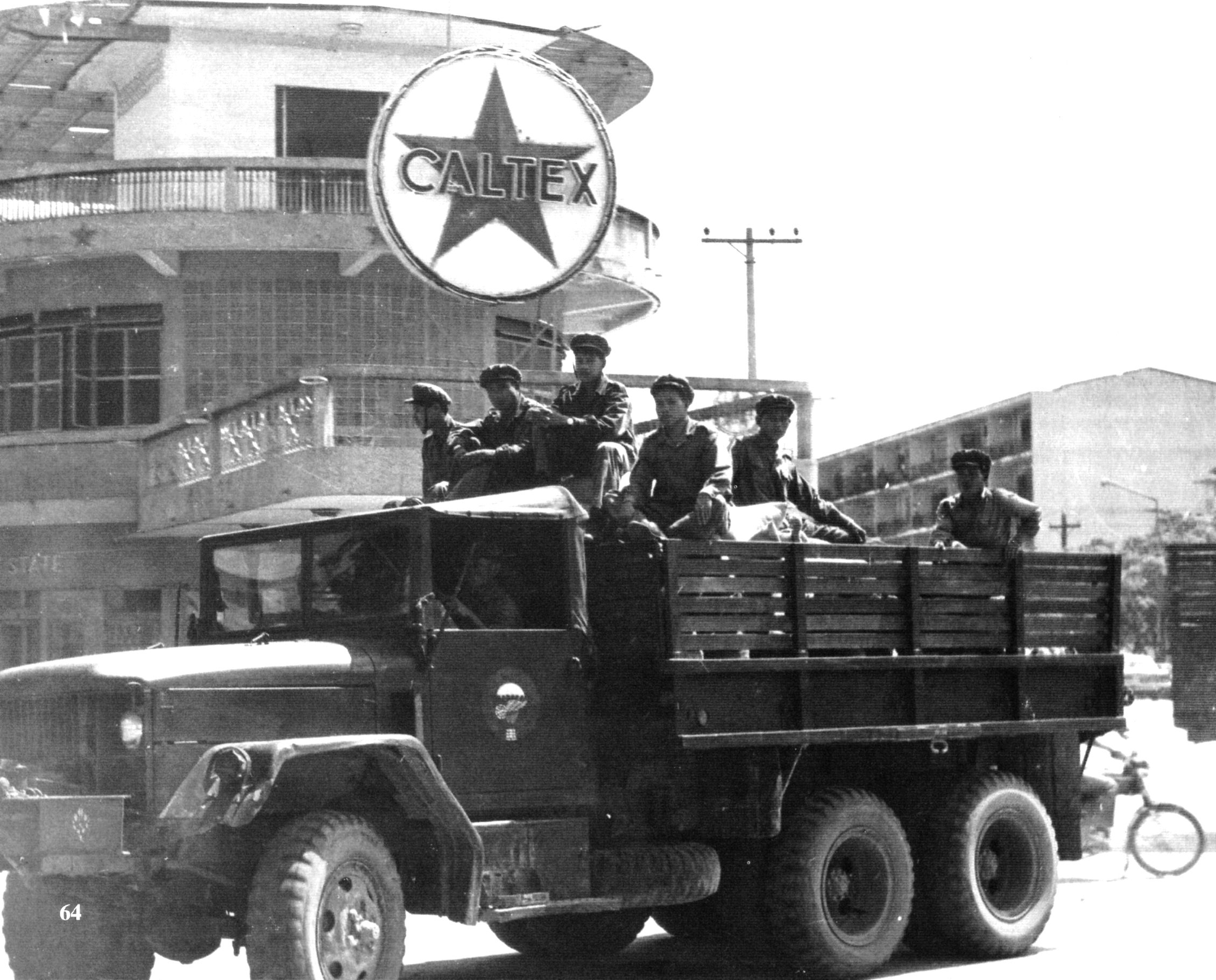
Vientiane in 1973

The following lists events that happened during 1973 in Laos.

== Incumbents ==
- Monarch: Savang Vatthana
- Prime Minister: Souvanna Phouma

== Events ==
=== February ===
- 21 February - The Vientiane Treaty is signed.
