= 2021 in Laos =

- Decades: 2000s; 2010s; 2020s
- See also: Other events of 2021; List of years in Laos

Events in the year 2021 in Laos.

== Incumbents ==
- Party General Secretary: Bounnhang Vorachith (until 15 January); Thongloun Sisoulith (from 15 January)
- President: Bounnhang Vorachith
- Prime Minister: Thongloun Sisoulith (until 22 March); Phankham Viphavanh (starting 22 March)
- Vice President: Phankham Viphavanh (until 22 March); Pany Yathotou and Bounthong Chitmany (starting 22 March)
- National Assembly President: Pany Yathotou

== Events ==
Ongoing — COVID-19 pandemic in Laos

=== January ===
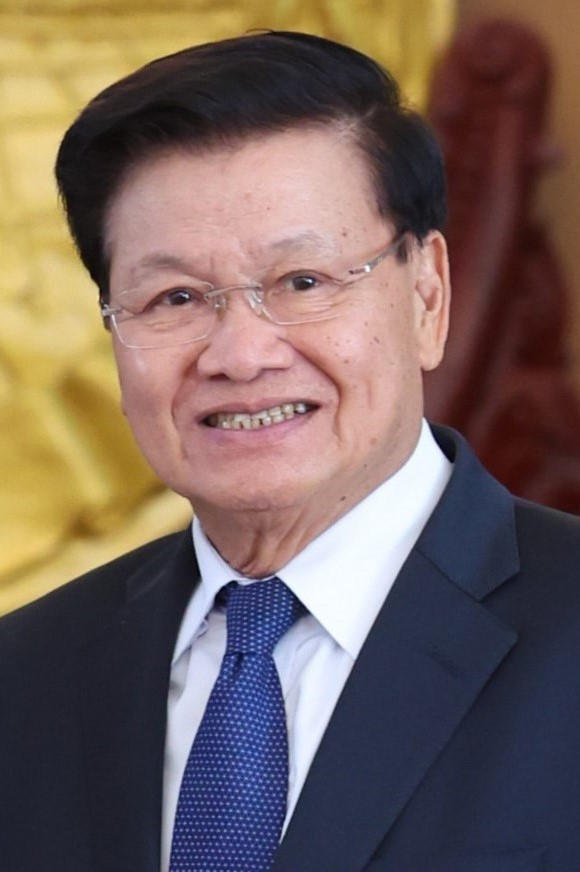
Thongloun Sisoulith is elected General Secretary of the Lao People's Revolutionary Party

- 13 to 15 January – The 11th National Congress of the Lao People's Revolutionary Party is held.
- 15 January – The 11th Central Committee of the Lao People's Revolutionary Party is elected. Thongloun Sisoulith is elected Party General Secretary.

=== December ===
- 3 December - Boten-Vientiane railway officially opened.

== Deaths ==
- 4 April – Keosaychay Sayasone, socialite (born 1958).
