= 1966 in Laos =

- Decades: 1940s; 1950s; 1960s; 1970s; 1980s
- See also: Other events of 1966; List of years in Laos

The following lists events that happened during 1966 in Laos.

== Incumbents ==
- Monarch: Savang Vatthana
- Prime Minister: Souvanna Phouma

== Events ==
=== August ===
- August - The Battle of Nam Bac begins.

== Births ==
- 18 June - Bounlap Khenkitisack, footballer
