= 1956 in Laos =

- Decades: 1930s; 1940s; 1950s; 1960s; 1970s
- See also: Other events of 1956; List of years in Laos

The following lists events that happened during 1956 in Laos.

== Incumbents ==
- Monarch: Sisavang Vong
- Prime Minister: Katay Don Sasorith (until 21 March), Souvanna Phouma (starting 21 March)

== Events ==
=== August ===
- date unknown – A coalition government between the Pathet Lao and National Progressive Party (Laos) is formed.

== Births ==
- 12 December – Xaysomphone Phomvihane, politician
