= 1983 in Laos =

- Decades: 1960s; 1970s; 1980s; 1990s; 2000s
- See also: Other events of 1983; List of years in Laos

The following lists events that happened during 1983 in Laos.

== Incumbents ==
- President: Souphanouvong
- Prime Minister: Kaysone Phomvihane

== Events ==
=== December ===
- 1 December - Lao National Television is established.
