= 1978 in Laos =

- Decades: 1950s; 1960s; 1970s; 1980s; 1990s
- See also: Other events of 1978; List of years in Laos

The following lists events that happened during 1978 in Laos.

== Incumbents ==
- President: Souphanouvong
- Prime Minister: Kaysone Phomvihane

== Births ==
- 24 September - Chaleunsouk Oudomphanh, Olympic athlete

== Deaths ==
- 2 May - Vong Savang, Lao crown prince
- 13 May - Sisavang Vatthana, last king of Laos
