= 1967 in Laos =

- Decades: 1940s; 1950s; 1960s; 1970s; 1980s
- See also: Other events of 1967; List of years in Laos

The following lists events that happened during 1967 in Laos.

== Incumbents ==
- Monarch: Savang Vatthana
- Prime Minister: Souvanna Phouma

== Events ==
=== January ===
- 1 January - 1967 Laotian parliamentary election
- 9 January - Ban Naden raid

=== July ===
- 29 July-1 August - 1967 Opium War
