= 2001 in Laos =

- Decades: 1980s; 1990s; 2000s; 2010s; 2020s
- See also: Other events of 2001; List of years in Laos

The following lists events that happened during 2001 in Laos.

== Incumbents ==
- President: Khamtai Siphandon
- Vice President: Choummaly Sayasone (starting 27 March)
- Prime Minister: Sisavath Keobounphanh (until 27 March), Bounnhang Vorachith (starting 27 March)

== Events ==
- Date unknown - 2001 Lao League
