= 2006 in Laos =

- Decades: 1980s; 1990s; 2000s; 2010s; 2020s
- See also: Other events of 2006; List of years in Laos

The following lists events that happened during 2006 in Laos.

== Incumbents ==
- President: Khamtai Siphandon (until 8 June), Choummaly Sayasone (starting 8 June)
- Vice President: Choummaly Sayasone (until 8 June), Bounnhang Vorachith (starting 8 June)
- Prime Minister: Bounnhang Vorachith (until 8 June), Bouasone Bouphavanh (starting 8 June)

== Events ==
- date unknown - 2006 Lao League
- 18-21 March - 8th Congress of the Lao People's Revolutionary Party
- 30 April - 2006 Laotian parliamentary election
