= 2007 in Laos =

- Decades: 1980s; 1990s; 2000s; 2010s; 2020s
- See also: Other events of 2007; List of years in Laos

The following lists events that happened during 2007 in Laos.

== Incumbents ==
- President: Choummaly Sayasone
- Vice President: Bounnhang Vorachith
- Prime Minister: Bouasone Bouphavanh

== Events ==
=== March ===
- March 4 – A 42-year-old woman dies of bird flu, or avian influenza, the first fatality of that illness in the country.
- March 8 – A 15-year-old Laotian girl dies while being cared for H5N1 bird flu at a hospital in Thailand. This was the country's first official H5N1 death.

=== May ===
- May 16 – A 6.1-magnitude earthquake strikes in remote northern Laos, and is felt as far away as Bangkok, Thailand, and Hanoi, Vietnam, where shoppers fled malls and high-rise buildings are evacuated. In Luang Prabang, 92 km. from the epicenter, residents said they felt only minor shaking. There were no reports of injuries or severe damage.

=== June ===
- June 4 – Former Royal Army of Laos general and Hmong military leader Vang Pao and nine others are charged in U.S. District Court in California with plotting to overthrow the Laotian government. The plan, prosecutors say, involved obtaining explosives, rifles, land mines and missiles, shipping them to Thailand, and using them blow up government buildings in Vientiane.
- June 5 – The Laotian government praises U.S. law enforcement officials for their arrest of Hmong military leader Vang Pao and the breaking up of a plot to overthrow the government. In Thailand, where the Laotian rebels had planned to ship their arms cache, officials say they will be investigating possible links to the case.
- June 11 – Bail is denied in U.S. federal court in Sacramento, California, for former Royal Lao Army general and Hmong leader Vang Pao, who is accused with nine others of plotting to overthrow the government of Laos. Around 2,000 supporters of Vang Pao gather outside the courthouse and protest.
- June 24 – More than 7,600 Laotian Hmong immigrants are moved to a new residential settlement to separate them from Thai-born Hmong in Phetchabun. The move was made for security purposes, as Thai Hmong were having to endure the same security Officials said as the Laotian Hmong.
