= 2009 in Laos =

- Decades: 1980s; 1990s; 2000s; 2010s; 2020s
- See also: Other events of 2009; List of years in Laos

The following lists events that happened during 2009 in Laos.

== Incumbents ==
- President: Choummaly Sayasone
- Vice President: Bounnhang Vorachith
- Prime Minister: Bouasone Bouphavanh

== Events ==
- date unknown - 2009 Lao League

=== December ===
- December - 2009 Southeast Asian Games
- 28 December - Thailand begins repatriating 4,000 Hmong to Laos against their will, despite international protest. The repatriation is completed the next day.
