= 2002 in Laos =

- Decades: 1980s; 1990s; 2000s; 2010s; 2020s
- See also: Other events of 2002; List of years in Laos

The following lists events that happened during 2002 in Laos.

== Incumbents ==
- President: Khamtai Siphandon
- Vice President: Choummaly Sayasone
- Prime Minister: Bounnhang Vorachith

== Events ==
- date unknown - 2002 Lao League

=== February ===
- 24 February - 2002 Laotian parliamentary election
