= 1975 in Laos =

- Decades: 1950s; 1960s; 1970s; 1980s; 1990s
- See also: Other events of 1975; List of years in Laos

The following lists events that happened during 1975 in Laos.

== Events ==
- December 2 – In Laos, the communist party of the Pathet Lao takes over Vientiane and defeats the Kingdom of Laos, forcing King Sisavang Vatthana to abdicate and creating the Lao People's Democratic Republic. This ends the Laotian Civil War, with mass evacuation of American troops and Laotian civilians, but effectively begins the Insurgency in Laos with the Pathet Lao fighting the Hmong people, Royalist-in-exile and the Right-wings. The Insurgency in Laos wouldn't end until March 30, 2022, when the last unorganized resistance against the Lao People's Army was finally put down.

== Incumbents ==
- Monarch: Savang Vatthana (abdicated 2 December)
- President: Souphanouvong (starting 2 December)
- Prime Minister: Souvanna Phouma (until 2 December), Kaysone Phomvihane (starting 2 December)
