= 2003 in Laos =

- Decades: 1980s; 1990s; 2000s; 2010s; 2020s
- See also: Other events of 2003; List of years in Laos

The following lists events that happened during 2003 in Laos.

== Incumbents ==
- President: Khamtai Siphandon
- Vice President: Choummaly Sayasone
- Prime Minister: Bounnhang Vorachith

== Events ==
- date unknown - 2003 Lao League

=== February ===
- February 12 - A dozen people were killed in an attack on several vehicles on a main highway.

=== June ===
- June 12 - Two European journalists and an American of Lao origin were arrested by the Lao government during a battle between Hmong rebels and Lao militia forces.

=== November ===
- November 25 - The remains of four Westerners killed during the Vietnam War were handed over to US officials
