= 1999 in Laos =

- Decades: 1970s; 1980s; 1990s; 2000s; 2010s
- See also: Other events of 1999; List of years in Laos

The following lists events that happened during 1999 in Laos.

== Incumbents ==
- President: Khamtai Siphandon
- Vice President: Oudom Khattigna (until 9 December)
- Prime Minister: Sisavath Keobounphanh

== Events ==
=== October ===
- 26 October - Five Lao student leaders are arrested for attempting to organize a peaceful protest demanding democratic reforms.

== Deaths ==
- 9 December - Oudom Khattigna, Vice President of Laos (b. 1930)
