= 2015 in Laos =

- Decades: 1990s; 2000s; 2010s; 2020s
- See also: Other events of 2015; List of years in Laos

The following lists events that happened during 2015 in Laos.

== Incumbents ==
- Party General Secretary: Choummaly Sayasone
- President: Choummaly Sayasone
- Vice President: Bounnhang Vorachith
- Prime Minister: Thongsing Thammavong
- National Assembly President: Pany Yathotou

== Events ==
=== May ===
- 30 May - opening of the Attapeu International Airport
- date unknown - 2015 Lao Premier League
