= 1994 in Laos =

- Decades: 1970s; 1980s; 1990s; 2000s; 2010s
- See also: Other events of 1994; List of years in Laos

The following lists events that happened during 1994 in Laos.

== Incumbents ==
- President: Nouhak Phoumsavanh
- Prime Minister: Khamtai Siphandon

== Births ==
- 2 February - Phoutdavy Phommasane, footballer
- 3 June - Sengdao Inthilath, footballer
- 2 September - Sitthideth Khanthavong, footballer
- 10 October - Khonesavanh Sihavong, footballer
