= 1972 in Laos =

- Decades: 1950s; 1960s; 1970s; 1980s; 1990s
- See also: Other events of 1972; List of years in Laos

The following lists events that happened during 1972 in Laos.

== Incumbents ==
- Monarch: Savang Vatthana
- Prime Minister: Souvanna Phouma

== Events ==
=== January ===
- 2 January - 1972 Laotian parliamentary election

== Deaths ==
- 18 October - Vang Sue, Hmong fighter pilot, shot down by anti-aircraft fire (b. 1945)
