= Capital punishment in Laos =

Capital punishment in Laos is permitted in the Laotian penal code. However, though Amnesty International estimates there were at least 315 people on death row in 2018, no executions have taken place since 1989. Despite this, the Laotian government refuses to ratify the Second Optional Protocol to the International Covenant on Civil and Political Rights or the Second Protocol to the American Convention on Human Rights, both of which require the signee to abolish the death penalty, or the 2010, 2012 and most recent 2022 United Nations resolutions for a moratorium on the death penalty.

== Penal code ==
Article 51 of the penal code, Death Penalty, states that the death penalty is to be carried out by shooting, but cannot be imposed on:

(unofficial translation) ... offenders of [sic] less than eighteen years old, on pregnant women, on women nursing their children under three years, on elderly persons sixty years of age and over and on persons with mental disabilities at the time when the offence was committed, when the court renders its decision, or when the sentence is served by commuting the sentence to life imprisonment.

However, article 86, Prescription of Penalties for Juvenile Offenders, also states that juveniles who have committed a crime that prescribes the death penalty will instead be sentenced to 20 years imprisonment.

The list of capital crimes includes, but is not limited to: "premeditated murder; terrorism-related offences; robbery; drug trafficking; drug possession; treason and spying. Amendments to the penal code have reduced the number of offences punishable by death from 18 to 12.

== Support in the case of drug offences ==
Laos is in the Golden Triangle, one of the largest opium-producing areas of the world since the 1950s, and 90% of death row inmates had committed drug-related crimes. In 2020, eight of the nine death sentences imposed that year were for drug crimes. So there is some public support for executing this class of criminal.

== Incidence (2018–2022) ==
According to Amnesty International, nine death sentences were handed down in 2020, five in 2022 and none in 2018, 2019 and 2021.

== See also ==
- 1989 in Laos
