= 2020 in Laos =

- Decades: 2000s; 2010s; 2020s
- See also: Other events of 2020; List of years in Laos

The following lists events that happened during 2020 in Laos.

== Incumbents ==
- Party General Secretary: Bounnhang Vorachith
- President: Bounnhang Vorachith
- Prime Minister: Thongloun Sisoulith
- Vice President: Phankham Viphavanh
- National Assembly President: Pany Yathotou

== Events ==
- 24 March – The country confirmed its first two COVID-19 cases, becoming the last Southeast Asian country infected with coronavirus.
- 27 March – Vietnam offers help to the country against the coronavirus by sending medical equipment worth US$100,000.
