= 2014 in Laos =

- Decades: 1990s; 2000s; 2010s; 2020s
- See also: Other events of 2014; List of years in Laos

The following lists events that happened during 2014 in Laos.

== Incumbents ==
- Party General Secretary: Choummaly Sayasone
- President: Choummaly Sayasone
- Vice President: Bounnhang Vorachith
- Prime Minister: Thongsing Thammavong

== Events ==
- 17 May - 2014 Lao People's Liberation Army Air Force An-74 crash
