= 2012 in Laos =

- Decades: 1990s; 2000s; 2010s; 2020s
- See also: Other events of 2012; List of years in Laos

The following lists events that happened during 2012 in Laos.

== Incumbents ==
- Party General Secretary: Choummaly Sayasone
- President: Choummaly Sayasone
- Vice President: Bounnhang Vorachith
- Prime Minister: Thongsing Thammavong

== Events ==
=== September ===
- September 6 - After Sri Lanka, Chinese Minister of Defence Liang Guanglie leaves India for Laos.

=== November ===
- November 5 - Asian and European leaders meet at the Ninth Asia–Europe Meeting in Vientiane to discuss issues including the current financial crisis. 51 foreign leaders are expected to attend including premier of China Wen Jiabao and President of Laos Choummaly Sayasone.
