= 1992 in Laos =

- Decades: 1970s; 1980s; 1990s; 2000s; 2010s
- See also: Other events of 1992; List of years in Laos

The following lists events that happened during 1992 in Laos.

== Incumbents ==
- President: Kaysone Phomvihane (until 21 November), Nouhak Phoumsavanh (starting 25 November)
- Prime Minister: Khamtai Siphandon

== Events ==
=== December ===
- 20 December - 1992 Laotian parliamentary election

== Births ==
- 9 March - Soukaphone Vongchiengkham, footballer
- 10 July - Konekham Inthammavong, footballer
- 26 September - Manolom Phomsouvanh, footballer
- 23 November - Ketsada Souksavanh, footballer
- 30 November - Keoviengphet Liththideth, footballer
- 9 December - Sopha Saysana, footballer

== Deaths ==
- 21 November - Kaysone Phomvihane, leader of the Lao People's Revolutionary Party (b. 1920)
