= 2000 in Laos =

- Decades: 1980s; 1990s; 2000s; 2010s; 2020s
- See also: Other events of 2000; List of years in Laos

The following lists events that happened during 2000 in Laos.

== Incumbents ==
- President: Khamtai Siphandon
- Vice President:
- Prime Minister: Sisavath Keobounphanh

== Events ==
=== July ===
- 3 July - Vang Tao Incident
