= 1969 in Laos =

- Decades: 1940s; 1950s; 1960s; 1970s; 1980s
- See also: Other events of 1969; List of years in Laos

The following lists events that happened during 1969 in Laos.

== Incumbents ==
- Monarch: Savang Vatthana
- Prime Minister: Souvanna Phouma

== Events ==
=== January ===
- 7 January - Operation Pigfat ends.

=== March ===
- 7 March-17 April - Operation Raindance

=== June ===
- 18 June - Campaign Toan Thang is launched.

=== July ===
- 1-15 July - Operation Off Balance
