= 1993 in Laos =

- Decades: 1970s; 1980s; 1990s; 2000s; 2010s
- See also: Other events of 1993; List of years in Laos

The following lists events that happened during 1993 in Laos.

== Incumbents ==
- President: Nouhak Phoumsavanh
- Prime Minister: Khamtai Siphandon

== Events ==
- On 13 December 1993, a Lao Aviation Harbin Yunshuji Y-12-II (registration RDPL-34117) crashed on approach to Phonesavanh Airport after clipping trees in fog, killing all 18 on board.

== Births ==
- 6 June - Tiny Bounmalay, footballer
- 18 December - Souliya Syphasay, footballer
