= 1998 in Laos =

- Decades: 1970s; 1980s; 1990s; 2000s; 2010s
- See also: Other events of 1998; List of years in Laos

The following lists events that happened during 1998 in Laos.

== Incumbents ==
- President: Nouhak Phoumsavanh (until 24 February), Khamtai Siphandon (starting 24 February)
- Vice President: Sisavath Keobounphanh (until 24 February), Oudom Khattigna (starting 24 February)
- Prime Minister: Khamtai Siphandon (until 24 February), Sisavath Keobounphanh (starting 24 February)

== Events ==
- date unknown - 1998 Lao League

== Births ==
- date unknown - Anousa Luangsuphom born.
