= 1963 in Laos =

- Decades: 1940s; 1950s; 1960s; 1970s; 1980s
- See also: Other events of 1963; List of years in Laos

The following lists events that happened during 1963 in Laos.

== Incumbents ==
- Monarch: Savang Vatthana
- Prime Minister: Souvanna Phouma

== Events ==
=== November ===
- November - The Battle of Lak Sao begins.

== Births ==
- 8 May - Soulivong Savang, current Lao royal pretender

== Deaths ==
- 1 April - Quinim Pholsena, Laotian foreign minister, assassinated
