= 1995 in Laos =

- Decades: 1970s; 1980s; 1990s; 2000s; 2010s
- See also: Other events of 1995; List of years in Laos

The following lists events that happened during 1995 in Laos.

== Incumbents ==
- President: Nouhak Phoumsavanh
- Prime Minister: Khamtai Siphandon

== Events ==
- Mekong River Commission created with Cambodia, Laos, Vietnam and Thailand as the members
- U.S. lifted 20-year aid embargo

== Births ==
- 4 November - Soukthavy Soundala, footballer
- 29 December - Phoutthasay Khochalern

== Deaths ==
- 9 January - Souphanouvong, Lao communist leader (b. 1909)
