= 1991 in Laos =

- Decades: 1970s; 1980s; 1990s; 2000s; 2010s
- See also: Other events of 1991; List of years in Laos

The following lists events that happened during 1991 in Laos.

== Incumbents ==
- President: Souphanouvong (until 15 August), Kaysone Phomvihane (starting 15 August)
- Prime Minister: Kaysone Phomvihane (until 15 August), Khamtai Siphandon (starting 15 August)

== Births ==
- 2 June - Seng Athit Somvang, footballer
