= 2008 in Laos =

- Decades: 1980s; 1990s; 2000s; 2010s; 2020s
- See also: Other events of 2008; List of years in Laos

The following lists events that happened during 2008 in Laos.

== Incumbents ==
- President: Choummaly Sayasone
- Vice President: Bounnhang Vorachith
- Prime Minister: Bouasone Bouphavanh

== Events ==
- date unknown - 2008 Lao League

== Deaths ==
- September 9 – Nouhak Phoumsavanh, President of Laos (b. 1910)
