= 2010 in Laos =

- Decades: 1990s; 2000s; 2010s; 2020s
- See also: Other events of 2010; List of years in Laos

The following lists events that happened during 2010 in Laos.

== Incumbents ==
- Party General Secretary: Choummaly Sayasone
- President: Choummaly Sayasone
- Vice President: Bounnhang Vorachith
- Prime Minister: Bouasone Bouphavanh (until 22 December), Thongsing Thammavong (starting 23 December)

== Events ==
- date unknown - 2010 Lao League

=== December ===
- 22 December - Bouasone Bouphavanh resigns and is replaced the next day by Thongsing Thammavong.
