= 1988 in Laos =

- Decades: 1960s; 1970s; 1980s; 1990s; 2000s
- See also: Other events of 1988; List of years in Laos

The following lists events that happened during 1988 in Laos.

== Incumbents ==
- President: Souphanouvong
- Prime Minister: Kaysone Phomvihane

== Events ==
=== February ===
- 19 February - A cease-fire is declared, ending the Thai–Laotian Border War.

== Births ==
- 15 April - Lamnao Singto, footballer
- 12 August - Souksavanh Tonsacktheva, athlete
