= 1959 in Laos =

- Decades: 1930s; 1940s; 1950s; 1960s; 1970s
- See also: Other events of 1959; List of years in Laos

The following lists events that happened during 1959 in Laos.

== Incumbents ==
- Monarch: Sisavang Vong (abdicated 29 October), Savang Vatthana (ascended 29 October)
- Prime Minister: Phoui Sananikone (until 31 December), Sounthone Pathammavong (starting 31 December)

== Events ==
=== January ===
- 22 January - Project Hotfoot (Laos) begins.

=== July ===
- 28-31 July - North Vietnamese invasion of Laos: North Vietnamese Army units attack Laos in support of the Pathet Lao.

=== September ===
- 7 September - United Nations Security Council Resolution 132 is adopted.

== Deaths ==
- 14 October - Phetsarath Ratanavongsa
- 29 October - Sisavang Vong
- 29 December - Katay Don Sasorith
