= 1989 in Laos =

- Decades: 1960s; 1970s; 1980s; 1990s; 2000s
- See also: Other events of 1989; List of years in Laos

The following lists events that happened during 1989 in Laos.

== Incumbents ==
- President: Souphanouvong
- Prime Minister: Kaysone Phomvihane

== Events ==
- The last known use of the Capital punishment in Laos

=== March ===
- 26 March - 1989 Laotian parliamentary election

== Births ==
- 26 April - Vilayphone Vongphachanh, swimmer
- 2 June - Kilakone Siphonexay, athlete
- 3 June - Viengsavanh Sayyaboun, footballer.
