= 1984 in Laos =

- Decades: 1960s; 1970s; 1980s; 1990s; 2000s
- See also: Other events of 1984; List of years in Laos

The following lists events that happened during 1984 in Laos.

== Incumbents ==
- President: Souphanouvong
- Prime Minister: Kaysone Phomvihane

== Deaths ==
- 10 January - Souvanna Phouma, Lao prime minister and neutralist leader (b. 1901)
