= 1979 in Laos =

- Decades: 1950s; 1960s; 1970s; 1980s; 1990s
- See also: Other events of 1979; List of years in Laos

The following lists events that happened during 1979 in Laos.

== Incumbents ==
- President: Souphanouvong
- Prime Minister: Kaysone Phomvihane

== Births ==
- 9 September - Phoutlamphay Thiamphasone

== Deaths ==
- date unknown - Touby Lyfoung
