= 2016 in Laos =

- Decades: 1990s; 2000s; 2010s; 2020s
- See also: Other events of 2016; List of years in Laos

The following lists events that happened during 2016 in Laos.

== Incumbents ==
- Party General Secretary: Choummaly Sayasone (until 22 January), Bounnhang Vorachith (starting 22 January)
- President: Choummaly Sayasone (until 20 April), Bounnhang Vorachith (starting 20 April)
- Prime Minister: Thongsing Thammavong (until 20 April), Thongloun Sisoulith (starting 20 April)
- Vice President: Bounnhang Vorachith (until 20 April), Phankham Viphavanh (starting 20 April)
- National Assembly President: Pany Yathotou

== Events ==
- 22 January–24 January - January 2016 East Asia Cold Wave
- 6 September–8 September - Eleventh East Asia Summit held in Vientiane
- 5 November - Beginning of the 2016 Mekong Club Championship
