= 1985 in Laos =

- Decades: 1960s; 1970s; 1980s; 1990s; 2000s
- See also: Other events of 1985; List of years in Laos

The following lists events that happened during 1985 in Laos.

== Incumbents ==
- President: Souphanouvong
- Prime Minister: Kaysone Phomvihane

== Births ==
- 12 June – Visay Phaphouvanin, professional footballer
