= 1977 in Laos =

- Decades: 1950s; 1960s; 1970s; 1980s; 1990s
- See also: Other events of 1977; List of years in Laos

The following lists events that happened during 1977 in Laos.

== Incumbents ==
- President: Souphanouvong
- Prime Minister: Kaysone Phomvihane

== Events ==
- 18 July - Laos signs a friendship treaty with Vietnam, providing for Vietnamese aid loans and reconstruction projects.

== Births ==
- 20 July - Anoulack Chanthivong, Australian politician
