= 1958 in Laos =

- Decades: 1930s; 1940s; 1950s; 1960s; 1970s
- See also: Other events of 1958; List of years in Laos

The following lists events that happened during 1958 in Laos.

== Incumbents ==
- Monarch: Sisavang Vong
- Prime Minister: Souvanna Phouma (until 17 August), Phoui Sananikone (starting 17 August)

== Events ==
- March–April - Operation Booster Shot

=== May ===
- 4 May - 1958 Laotian parliamentary election

=== December ===
- North Vietnamese invasion of Laos
