= 1997 in Laos =

- Decades: 1970s; 1980s; 1990s; 2000s; 2010s
- See also: Other events of 1997; List of years in Laos

The following lists events that happened during 1997 in Laos.

== Incumbents ==
- President: Nouhak Phoumsavanh
- Vice President: Sisavath Keobounphanh
- Prime Minister: Khamtai Siphandon

== Events ==
=== July ===
- 23 July — Laos is admitted to the ASEAN.

=== December ===
- 21 December - 1997 Laotian parliamentary election
