= 1960 in Laos =

- Decades: 1940s; 1950s; 1960s; 1970s; 1980s
- See also: Other events of 1960; List of years in Laos

The following lists events that happened during 1960 in Laos.

== Incumbents ==
- Monarch: Savang Vatthana
- Prime Minister:
  - until 7 January: Sounthone Pathammavong
  - 7 January-3 June: Kou Abhay
  - 3 June-15 August: Somsanith Vongkotrattana
  - 15 August-30 August: vacant
  - 30 August-13 December: Souvanna Phouma
  - starting 13 December: Boun Oum

== Events ==
=== April ===
- 24 April - 1960 Laotian parliamentary election

=== August ===
- 10 August - 1960 Laotian coups: Kong Le's coup

=== December ===
- 13-16 December - Battle of Vientiane
