= 2019 in Laos =

- Decades: 1990s; 2000s; 2010s; 2020s
- See also: Other events of 2019; List of years in Laos

Events of 2019 in Laos.

== Incumbents ==
- Party General Secretary: Bounnhang Vorachith
- President: Bounnhang Vorachith
- Prime Minister: Thongloun Sisoulith

== Events ==
- Laos Armed Force 70th Anniversary Military Parade.

== Deaths ==
- May 3, 2019: Death of British 19-year-old Lee Bartlett at the Nana Backpacker Hostel in Laos.
