= 1970 in Laos =

- Decades: 1950s; 1960s; 1970s; 1980s; 1990s
- See also: Other events of 1970; List of years in Laos

The following lists events that happened during 1970 in Laos.

== Incumbents ==
- Monarch: Savang Vatthana
- Prime Minister: Souvanna Phouma

== Events ==
=== March ===
- 9 March - Operation Diamond Arrow ends.

=== September ===
- 11-13 September - Operation Tailwind
