= 2017 in Laos =

- Decades: 1990s; 2000s; 2010s; 2020s
- See also: Other events of 2017; List of years in Laos

The following lists events that happened during 2017 in Laos.

== Incumbents ==
- Party General Secretary: Bounnhang Vorachith
- President: Bounnhang Vorachith
- Prime Minister: Thongloun Sisoulith
- Vice President: Phankham Viphavanh
- National Assembly President: Pany Yathotou

== Events ==
- 2017 Asia Rugby Women's Sevens Series
