= 1965 in Laos =

- Decades: 1940s; 1950s; 1960s; 1970s; 1980s
- See also: Other events of 1965; List of years in Laos

The following lists events that happened during 1965 in Laos.

== Incumbents ==
- Monarch: Savang Vatthana
- Prime Minister: Souvanna Phouma

== Events ==
=== July ===
- 18 July - 1965 Laotian parliamentary election

=== November ===
- November - The Wapi Project begins.
