= The Chinese Road =

Chinese name
- Traditional Chinese: 中國之路
- Simplified Chinese: 中国之路
Transcriptions
Standard Mandarin
- Hanyu Pinyin: Zhōngguó zhī lù

Lao name
- Lao: ເສັ້ນທາງຈີນ
- Romanization: Senthang Chin

The Chinese Road (also called 'The Chinese Roads') were a series of highways built as a foreign aid project by the People's Republic of China (PRC) in northern Laos, beginning in 1962. The first new road was built from Mengla, Yunnan, to Phongsali, Laos; it was completed on 25 May 1963. The next major road built was Route 46, begun in the 1966 dry season and stretching from the southern tip of Yunnan Province southward toward the border of Thailand. As 25,000 Chinese troops and 400 antiaircraft guns came to be posted to defend Route 46, and Thai support of American war efforts in both the Laotian Civil War and the Vietnam War became widely known, there was uneasiness among both Thai and American intelligence communities concerning Communist China's intents in constructing the all-weather highway. American interest in the new road extended up to the White House.

Central Intelligence Agency (CIA) trained guerrillas spied on Route 46, and there was an attempt to block it with the abortive Operation Snake Eyes. However, Chinese antiaircraft fire upon overflying aircraft and steady increases in Chinese troops guaranteed its security from attack. In turn, while there were some preemptive joint military operations during 1972 by troops of both the Royal Lao Army and the Royal Thai Army along the Lao/Thai border just south of Route 46, the road was not used to invade Thailand. The Chinese did chase the local Lao population from the Pak Beng Valley verging on the road to expedite Chinese occupation, but stopped the road at the Mekong River short of the Lao/Thai border. While there were several theories about China's intent in building Route 46, the only firm conclusion was one by an anonymous American military intelligence analyst: "Northern Laos has a new border."

== Background ==
The Kingdom of Laos gained independence from French colonial rule at the end of the First Indochina War. From its inception, Laos was troubled by a communist insurrection. The United States stepped in provide foreign aid to Laos, to aid in quelling the uprising.

In March 1961, the Geneva Conference of 1954 reconvened with wider participation to reconsider the neutralization of the Kingdom of Laos. Since the 1954 Agreement was signed, a Pathet Lao insurgency had burgeoned, threatening the national sovereignty. This would eventually result in an attempt to settle the Laotian Civil War, the International Agreement on the Neutrality of Laos signed on 23 July 1962.

Prime Minister Souvanna Phouma curried favor with the People's Republic of China by striking a road construction deal with them in January 1962. The Chinese government committed to the foreign aid commitment of building roads connecting Yunnan Province with northern Laos despite the developing Laotian Civil War. At the time the agreement was announced, the Battle of Luang Namtha was being fought on the Lao/Chinese border.

== Activities ==
=== Phongsali Province ===
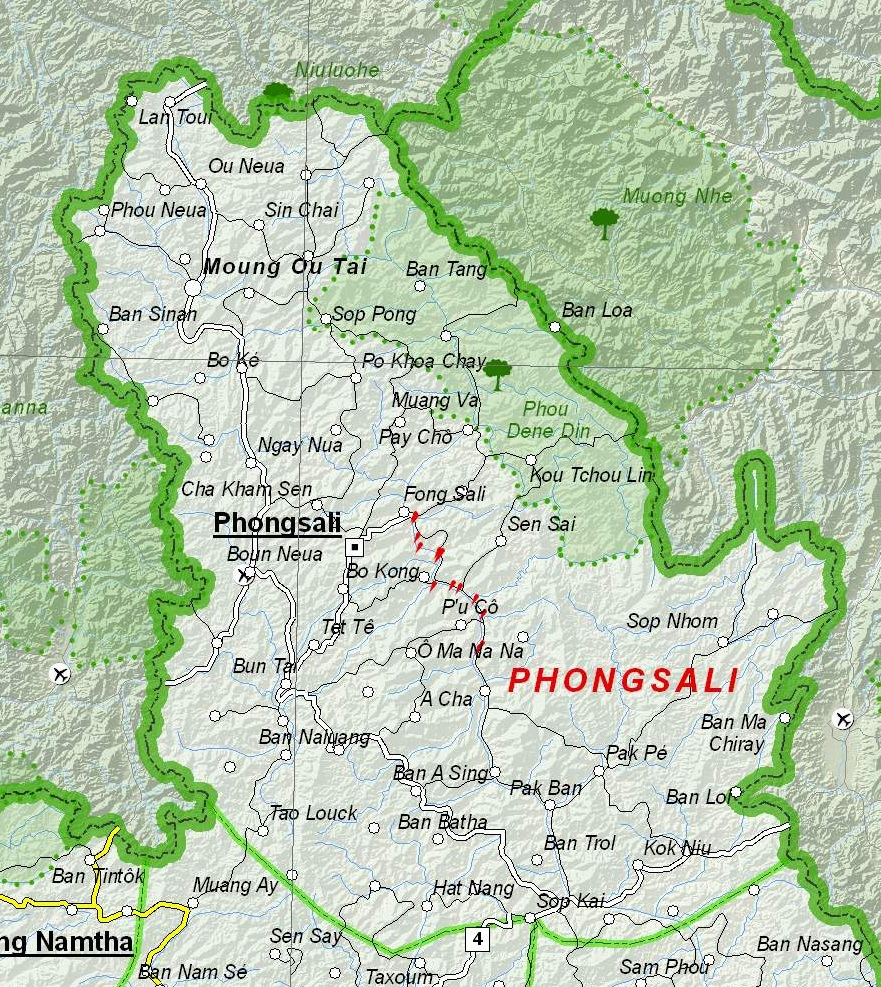
The location of Meng La, China, where road construction began, is approximated by the airfield marker on the left edge of the map.

The first road constructed by the Chinese was begun by 10,000 laborers in 1962, following a deteriorated route from Meng La, China to Phongsali, Laos. The 80 kilometer dirt track was completed on 25 May 1963. It was dubbed the Laotian-Chinese Friendship Highway and given to the Pathet Lao. The new road washed out in that rainy season. A repair and washout cycle followed for the next two years. The only military activity connected with this road was some training of Patriotic Neutralists officers by the Chinese army in Phongsali later, in 1965. After completion of the Friendship Highway, the Chinese did not consult the Royal Lao Government (RLG) before beginning to survey other road alignments.

At the time, the CIA was running a covert paramilitary operation from Nam Yu, Laos, somewhat southwest of this original road and near Luang Namtha. CIA sponsored Royalist guerrillas had cut the Route 32 Pathet Lao supply line between Moung Sing and Luang Namtha. The CIA thought fighting between their guerrillas and the Pathet Lao along the border may have sparked this road construction. During the dry season of the first few months of 1966, Chinese crews began constructing three more roads within Yunnan Province, but pointed towards the Laotian border. Route 411 ran southwest from Meng Mang. Route 412 stretched toward the border village of Batene. Route 4023 split from 412 with a southeasterly heading. After a rainy season break, the road crews resumed construction in late 1966, extending the three roads to the border by early 1967. Chinese porters helped restore the broken Route 32 logistics link. By late 1967, People's Liberation Army forces began making one- and two-day incursions into Laos along the border. Route 12 was now defended by 17 antiaircraft guns.

The resident CIA case officer now sent road watch teams from Nam Yu into China to spy on the construction as the work continued into 1968. The Lao loss of the Battle of Nam Bac southeast of the construction in January seemed to spur the Chinese on in their endeavors. There were now six companies of the PLA stationed within Laos. However, on 16 June 1968, road work was halted because of the Chinese Cultural Revolution. It resumed in mid-August with the arrival of a convoy of 208 trucks. By the end of August, Route 412 had been extended to join the existing Route 31. In turn, this hooked to Route 4. By mid-October there were 1,000 combat troops guarding 2,000 construction workers on Route 4; they were equipped with ten bulldozers and a steamroller. Their expressed purpose was the upgrading of Route 4 into a six meter wide extension of their road network to Moung Sai. There it would meet both Route 45 and Route 46.

In January 1969, the new road segment was completed to Moung Sai. The remainder of the dry season was spent by the Chinese in building a road northeastward to Moung Sai to connect with the old Route 45. By April, the rains again halted construction. Later that year, dry weather brought on a resumption of road work. The new segment to Route 45 was restarted, though at a low level of activity. The Chinese emphasis became Route 46.

Meanwhile, Route 45 had been extended to Moung Khoua on the Nam Ou; a ferry dock was built to transfer traffic across the river to Route 19, which connected to Dien Ben Phu. A battery of antiaircraft guns was installed at Muang Khoua.

=== South toward Thailand ===
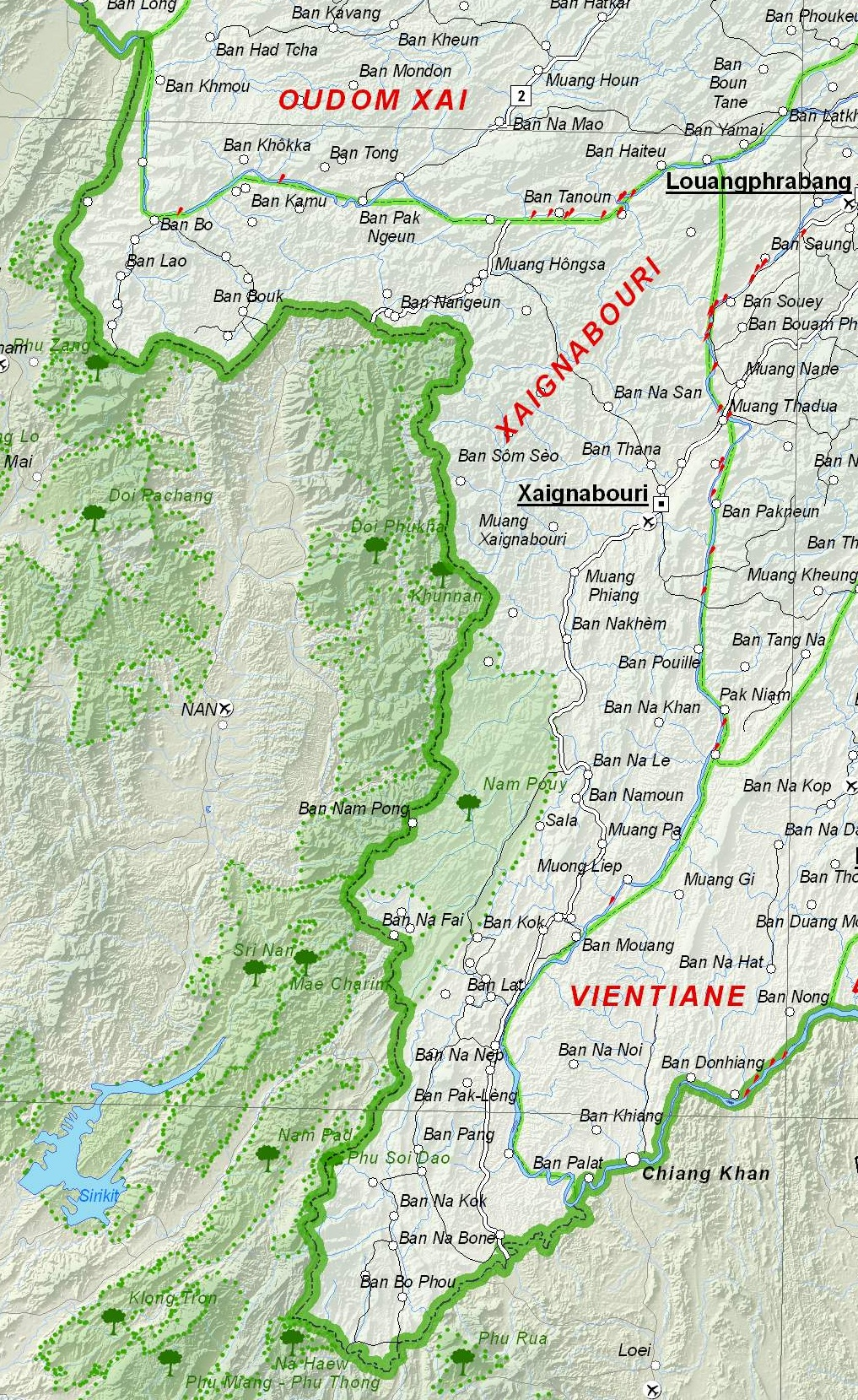
The terminus of Route 46 (since renumbered as Route 2) is shown in the top middle of this map.

The old French Route 46 alignment south down the Pak Beng Valley to Pakbeng on the Mekong River ended just a short distance from the border with the Kingdom of Thailand. Improvement of this road threatened the security of Thailand. As the Thai Deputy Prime Minister stated, with only some exaggeration, "Chinese and North Vietnamese Communists...only three hours by motor vehicle drive from the border." If the news that Route 46 had reached Moung Houn by early November 1969 was not sufficiently perturbing, the movement of antiaircraft guns that far south garnered attention. In December they fired upon the unarmed Douglas C-47 of General Ouane Rattikone proving that the Chinese would ward off intrusions. The Royal Lao Government began to worry also, and King Sisavang Vatthana urged Souvanna Phouma to take military action against the construction. In mid-December, U.S. Ambassador G. McMurtrie Godley cabled for approval to take military action in the next dry season. Approval was promptly refused. However, despite Washington's refusal, Royalist guerrillas were already spying on the construction. For added expertise, a few Nationalist Chinese were lured away from the opium trade in nearby Burma to augment the road watch teams.

As 1970 began, Communist forces began to drive the Royalist guerrillas from the Pak Beng Valley all the way south to the Mekong. A couple of checkpoint posts on the Thai-Lao border were seized. Ambassador Godley cabled Washington proposing that Operation Snake Eyes become a road watch team passively gathering military intelligence before the Royalists could mount an attack. As he awaited an answer, two Royal Lao Air Force (RLAF) T-28s struck the road in early January 1970. Two Thai mercenary pilots, instigated by their government, flew out of Vientiane and struck a Chinese convoy, destroying 15 trucks. At about this time, recruitment of Commando Raiders for operations against the Chinese construction began in Luang Prabang.

One week later, Operation Snake Eyes was authorized on the proviso that Souvanna Phouma, who was a Neutralist, come out as opposed to the Chinese road construction through the Kingdom. With only an inactive skeleton crew stationed along Route 46 for the wet season, the actual launch date for the operation was postponed to six months thence. However, three platoons of guerrillas from Nam Yu were infiltrated 50 kilometers south of Luang Namtha to spy on Route 46; they were dubbed Teams 37A, 37B, and 37C.

The six month setback proved to be unfortunate timing for operations against the Chinese Road. As the postponement ended, the Cambodian incursion by the U.S. raised such international furor that Operation Snake Eyes was again ordered on hold to avoid calling attention to the U.S. covert operations in Laos.

By April 1971, Route 46 had been asphalted to Moung Houn, making it an all-weather road. During the first four months of 1971, the North Vietnamese moved in 400 antiaircraft guns along Route 46, along with 30 fire direction radars. The 400 antiaircraft guns, along with 25,000 troops, made the Chinese Road foreign aid project one of the most heavily defended spots in Southeast Asia. Thai reaction to this extension was a clearing sweep along the border called Operation Phalat. In early August, U.S. President Richard M. Nixon closed down Nam Yu's cross-border incursions and placed an 11 kilometer no-fly zone around Route 46; this was a prelude for his later trip to China. The Chinese bulldozers were cutting the last segment of Route 46 that led into Pakbeng. The town now contained a Pathet Lao base camp. As apprehension mounted about penetration to the Thai border, on 11 September the American embassy requested a U.S. Air Force strike on the Pathet Lao base camp.

The prohibition of USAF flights over Route 46 did not prevent defensive fire on civilian airplanes by Chinese antiaircraft gunners. A Royal Air Lao DC-3 and an Air America C-123 were shot down during December 1971. In January 1972, an Air America pilot lost a leg to Chinese antiaircraft fire. Beginning in March 1972, Chinese troops began filtering down Route 46. By Autumn 1972, Route 46 had been extended to within 15 kilometers of Pak Beng. Much of it was dual lane paved road. Chinese forces in Laos now totaled 25,000, including a regiment of PLA infantry regulars. By now, nervous Thai authorities stationed some of their Project Unity troops along their border south of Pakbeng. This would lead into a series of clashes that became Operation Phalat and Operation Sourisak Montry. The Thais were not only intent of defending their border; they wished to combat Thai Communist insurgents.

== Politico-military implications of the Chinese Road ==
The implications of the Chinese Road's construction remain obscure. Originally, the CIA could not discern a reason for building this Phongsali road segment. However, it theorized that the Chinese were willing to let the North Vietnamese carry the brunt of waging war in Laos, but that security of the Lao/Chinese border was still a concern. U.S. military intelligence analysts speculated about the purpose of the Road. Was it an infiltration route to aid the Thai communist insurrection near the northern Thai border? Or was it built to counter any possible PAVN influence in the Mekong Valley? Postwar Zhou Enlai indeed insinuated to Henry Kissinger that the Chinese Road was a ploy to deny North Vietnamese any influence along the Mekong. However, he did not confirm that.

By late 1971, international politics impinged on the Chinese Road. President Nixon was intent on capitalizing on dissension between the People's Republic of China and the Soviet Union. To cozy up the Chinese leadership, Nixon halted the cross-border intelligence missions being staged out of northern Laos. He also barred any USAF flights within 11 kilometers of Route 46. When aircraft impinged on the construction and came under fire, he ignored the incidents.

An anonymous CIA intelligence analyst drew the sole conclusion from the situation in a pithy observation: "Northern Laos has a new border."

== Postwar ==
Although Chinese road builders remained in Laos through the end of the Laotian Civil War, Routes 45 and 19 were never quite linked, so the North Vietnamese could not transit Laos to its far northwest. The new Chinese routes were not extended to Luang Prabang. After the war's end, the Lao People's Democratic Republic invited a Chinese extension of their road construction to the former royal capital. The Vietnamese invasion of Cambodia soured the deal in 1979, with the Chinese road builders invited to leave Laos. Post 1990, the political climate had warmed enough for the Lao to invite roadwork bids from Chinese firms in Yunnan.

By 1993, there was a seasonal dirt track connecting the Chinese Road with Luang Prabang.
