= 1955 in Laos =

- Decades: 1930s; 1940s; 1950s; 1960s; 1970s
- See also: Other events of 1955; List of years in Laos

The following lists events that happened during 1955 in Laos.

== Incumbents ==
- Monarch: Sisavang Vong
- Prime Minister: Katay Don Sasorith

== Events ==
=== January ===
- 28 January
  - The Royal Lao Air Force is established as the Lao Air Force.
  - The Royal Lao Navy is established.

=== December ===
- 14 December - Laos is admitted to the United Nations under United Nations Security Council Resolution 109.
- 25 December - 1955 Laotian parliamentary election
