= 1996 in Laos =

- Decades: 1970s; 1980s; 1990s; 2000s; 2010s
- See also: Other events of 1996; List of years in Laos

The following lists events that happened during 1996 in Laos.

== Incumbents ==
- President: Nouhak Phoumsavanh
- Vice President: Sisavath Keobounphanh (starting unknown date)
- Prime Minister: Khamtai Siphandon

== Events ==
=== March ===
- 18-20 March - 6th Congress of the Lao People's Revolutionary Party
