= 1971 in Laos =

- Decades: 1950s; 1960s; 1970s; 1980s; 1990s
- See also: Other events of 1971; List of years in Laos

The following lists events that happened during 1971 in Laos.

== Incumbents ==
- Monarch: Savang Vatthana
- Prime Minister: Souvanna Phouma

== Events ==
=== February ===
- 8 February-25 March - Operation Lam Son 719

== Deaths ==
- 10 February - Larry Burrows, British photojournalist (b. 1926)
