= 2018 in Laos =

- Decades: 1990s; 2000s; 2010s; 2020s
- See also: Other events of 2018; List of years in Laos

Events in the year 2018 in Laos.

== Incumbents ==
- Party General Secretary: Bounnhang Vorachith
- President: Bounnhang Vorachith
- Prime Minister: Thongloun Sisoulith

== Events ==
Map showing the location of the dams, the rivers and surrounding area of the dam collapse.
- 23 July – The collapse of Saddle Dam D, part of a larger hydroelectric dam system under construction in southeast Laos's Champasak Province, lead to widespread destruction and homelessness in neighbouring Attapeu Province.

== Deaths ==
- 4 January – Sauryavong Savang, royal (b. 1937).
