= 1964 in Laos =

- Decades: 1940s; 1950s; 1960s; 1970s; 1980s
- See also: Other events of 1964; List of years in Laos

The following lists events that happened during 1964 in Laos.

== Incumbents ==
- Monarch: Savang Vatthana
- Prime Minister: Souvanna Phouma

== Events ==
=== January ===
- January - The Battle of Lak Sao ends.

=== July ===
- 19-29 July - Operation Triangle
