= 1957 in Laos =

- Decades: 1930s; 1940s; 1950s; 1960s; 1970s
- See also: Other events of 1957; List of years in Laos

The following lists events that happened during 1957 in Laos.

== Incumbents ==
- Monarch: Sisavang Vong
- Prime Minister: Souvanna Phouma

== Events ==
=== May ===
- 11 May - Laos withdraws from the French Union.

=== Births ===
- 12 July - Vang Pobzeb
