= Kitsada Thongkhen =

Laotian footballer

Personal information
- Full name: Kitsada Thongkhen
- Date of birth: April 8, 1987 (age 39)
- Place of birth: Vientiane, Laos
- Height: 1.70 m (5 ft 7 in)
- Position: Defender

International career
Years	Team	Apps	(Gls)
2004–	Laos	15	(1)

Kitsada Thongkhen (born 8 April 1987) is a Laotian footballer who plays as a defender. He made his first appearance for the Laos national football team in 2004.

== International goals ==
No.	Date	Venue	Opponent	Score	Result	Competition
1.	10 February 2011	National Stadium, Kaohsiung, Taiwan	Chinese Taipei	1–5	2–5	2012 AFC Challenge Cup
