= Vientiane Agreement =

1973 cease-fire agreement in the Laotian Civil War

The Vientiane Agreement was a cease-fire agreement between the two warring factions in the Laotian Civil War, the Kingdom of Laos and the communist Pathet Lao, signed in Vientiane, the capital of Laos, on 21 February 1973.

== Agreement ==
The Vientiane Agreement was a corollary to the Paris Peace Accords, signed the month before, which had ended U.S. involvement in the Vietnam War. Just as the Paris Accords had mandated the withdrawal of all American forces in Vietnam, the Vientiane Treaty called for the removal from Laos of all foreign forces allied to each side. Security in major cities, such as Vientiane, was to be undertaken by joint forces.

Unlike previous Lao ceasefires such as the one in 1962, there were no outside guarantees to the terms, as the agreement was only between the Lao factions; the ICC, which had overseen the 1954 Geneva Accords ending the First Indochina War, was unable to monitor compliance.

Under the terms of the treaty, a new coalition government was to be created under Prime Minister Souvanna Phouma featuring individuals from both sides. The creation of the Provisional Government of National Union was proclaimed in 1974; however, the government envisaged by the treaty did not long outlast it. As with the treaty itself, events in Laos emulated those in Vietnam. Shortly after the fall of the South Vietnamese government on 30 April 1975, the Pathet Lao took over Laos. The Pathet Lao continued to operate ostensibly as part of the coalition government until the abdication of King Sisavang Vatthana on 29 November and the proclamation of the People's Democratic Republic of Laos on 2 December 1975.
