= Chintana Souksavath =

Laotian footballer

Personal information
- Full name: Chintana Souksavath
- Date of birth: 20 July 1990 (age 36)
- Place of birth: Vientiane, Laos

Team information
- Current team: Lao Toyota FC

Senior career*
Years	Team	Apps	(Gls)
2016–	Lao Toyota FC		(0)

International career
2011–	Laos	?	(0)
- * Club domestic league appearances and goals

Chintana Souksavath (born 20 July 1990 in Vientiane) is a Laotian football player. He is a member of Laos national football team. He also played for Lao Toyota FC in 2016.
