= Tham Pha =

Cave in Laos

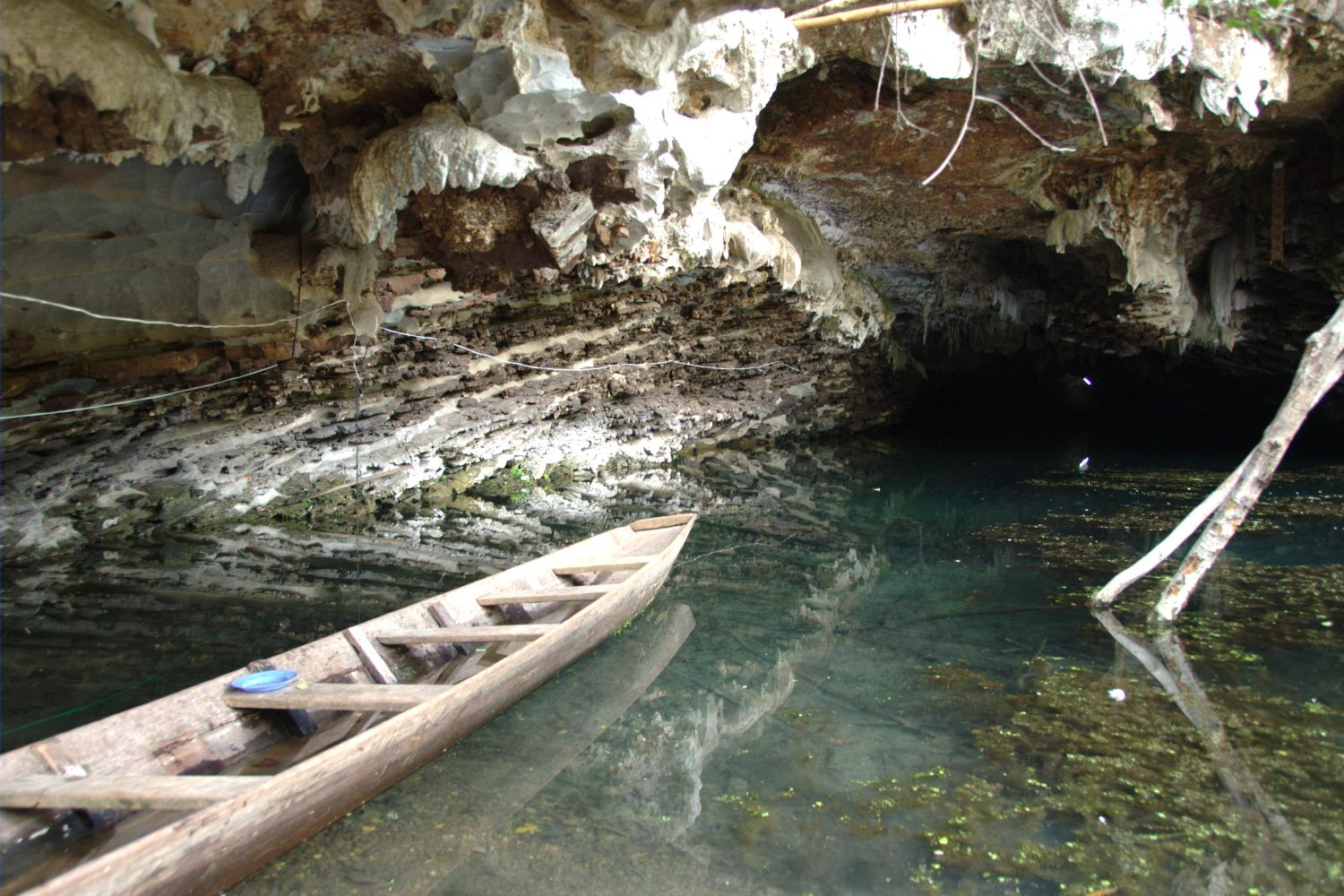
Tham Pha

Tham Pha, also known as Buddha Cave, is a cave in Khammouane Province, Laos. The Karst limestone cave was only discovered in April 2004 by a local farmer who upon entering it found a treasure trove of 229 Buddha statues, estimated to be over 450 years old. It is believed that the Buddha statues were hidden to prevent them being looted by invading Haw peoples. The largest Buddha statue is seated at the main entrance. A stupa is located at the nearby Tham That cave.
