= 1954 in Laos =

- Decades: 1930s; 1940s; 1950s; 1960s; 1970s
- See also: Other events of 1954; List of years in Laos

The following lists events that happened during 1954 in Laos.

== Incumbents ==
- Monarch: Sisavang Vong
- Prime Minister: Souvanna Phouma (until 25 October), Katay Don Sasorith (starting 25 October)

== Events ==
=== August ===
- August 1 - The First Indochina War ends with the Vietnam People's Army in North Vietnam, the Vietnamese National Army in South Vietnam, the Kingdom of Cambodia in Cambodia, and the Kingdom of Laos in Laos, emerging victorious against the French Army.

=== December ===
- December 24 - Laos gains full independence from France.
