= COVID-19 pandemic in Laos =

COVID-19 viral pandemic in Laos

- Disease: COVID-19
- Pathogen: SARS-CoV-2
- Location: Laos
- First outbreak: Wuhan, China
- Index case: Vientiane
- Arrival date: 24 March 2020 (6 years, 6 months, 1 week and 3 days)
- Confirmed cases: 219,060
- Recovered: 217,811 (updated 23 July 2023)
- Deaths: 671
- Fatality rate: 0.31%

Government website
- Centre of Information and Education for Health

The COVID-19 pandemic in Laos is part of the worldwide pandemic of coronavirus disease 2019 (COVID-19) caused by severe acute respiratory syndrome coronavirus 2 (SARS-CoV-2). On 24 March 2020, Laos became the last country in Southeast Asia to report its confirmed case of the virus. As of 5 June 2022, there were a total of 210,081 cases and 756 deaths. On 4 May 2021, Laos exceeded 1,000 cases of COVID-19. Five days later, the country recorded the first death.

On 21 December 2021, Laos overtook China in terms of the number of confirmed COVID-19 cases.

== Background ==
On 12 January 2020, the World Health Organization (WHO) confirmed that a novel coronavirus was the cause of a respiratory illness in a cluster of people in Wuhan City, Hubei Province, China, which was reported to the WHO on 31 December 2019.

The case fatality ratio for COVID-19 has been much lower than SARS of 2003, but the transmission has been significantly greater, with a significant total death toll.

== Timeline ==
=== 2020 ===
==== March ====
On 13 March, provincial authorities closed some of border posts.

On 24 March, Laos confirmed its first two COVID-19 cases, becoming the last Southeast Asian country infected with coronavirus.

On 26 March, the Vientiane Times confirmed the country's third COVID-19 case.

On 27 March, there were six cases confirmed. Two more men from Luang Prabang, and one from Vientiane.

On 28 March, there were 2 more confirmed, bringing a total to 8.

On 30 March, there was 1 more confirmed, bringing everything to a total of 9.

==== April ====
On 1 April, one more case was confirmed, bringing a total to 10.

On 5 April 2020, the 11th case was reported as a 55-year-old man from Papua New Guinea.

The government announced a lockdown on 29, March, starting on 30 March. All land borders closed and the last flights departed from Luang Prabang and Vientiane occurred on 1 April.

==== May ====
By May 18, more restrictions had been loosened, allowing domestic travel, without foreign travellers allowed.

==== June ====
On 2 June, students returned to classrooms.

On 4 June, the government allowed foreign travellers into the country.

==== July to December ====
On 25 July, one new case was confirmed. It was a South Korean national.

2,621 people were isolated over concerns.

=== 2021 ===
==== March ====
A second wave of vaccinations occurred.

==== May ====
On the morning of 9 May, Laos recorded the first death due to COVID-19. The Embassy of Vietnam in Vientiane confirmed that was a Vietnamese woman died after one week of treatment.

== Statistics ==
COVID-19 pandemic in Laos (per WHO)
| Province | Confirmed | Deaths |
|---|---|---|
| Savannakhet | 6,865 | 8 |
| Vientiane | 6,299 | 6 |
| Champasak | 5,076 | 4 |
| Khammouane | 2,503 | 1 |
| Salavan | 1,653 | 1 |
| Bokeo | 1,097 | 0 |
| Luang Prabang | 613 | 0 |
| Vientiane Province | 341 | 1 |
| Bolikhamsai | 138 | 0 |
| Luang Namtha | 103 | 0 |
| Xaisomboun | 82 | 0 |
| Xayaboury | 55 | 0 |
| Oudomxay | 38 | 0 |
| Xiangkhouang | 26 | 0 |
| Attapeu | 12 | 0 |
| Sekong | 8 | 0 |
| Phongsaly | 7 | 0 |

Confirmed new cases per day

Confirmed deaths per day

== Assistance ==
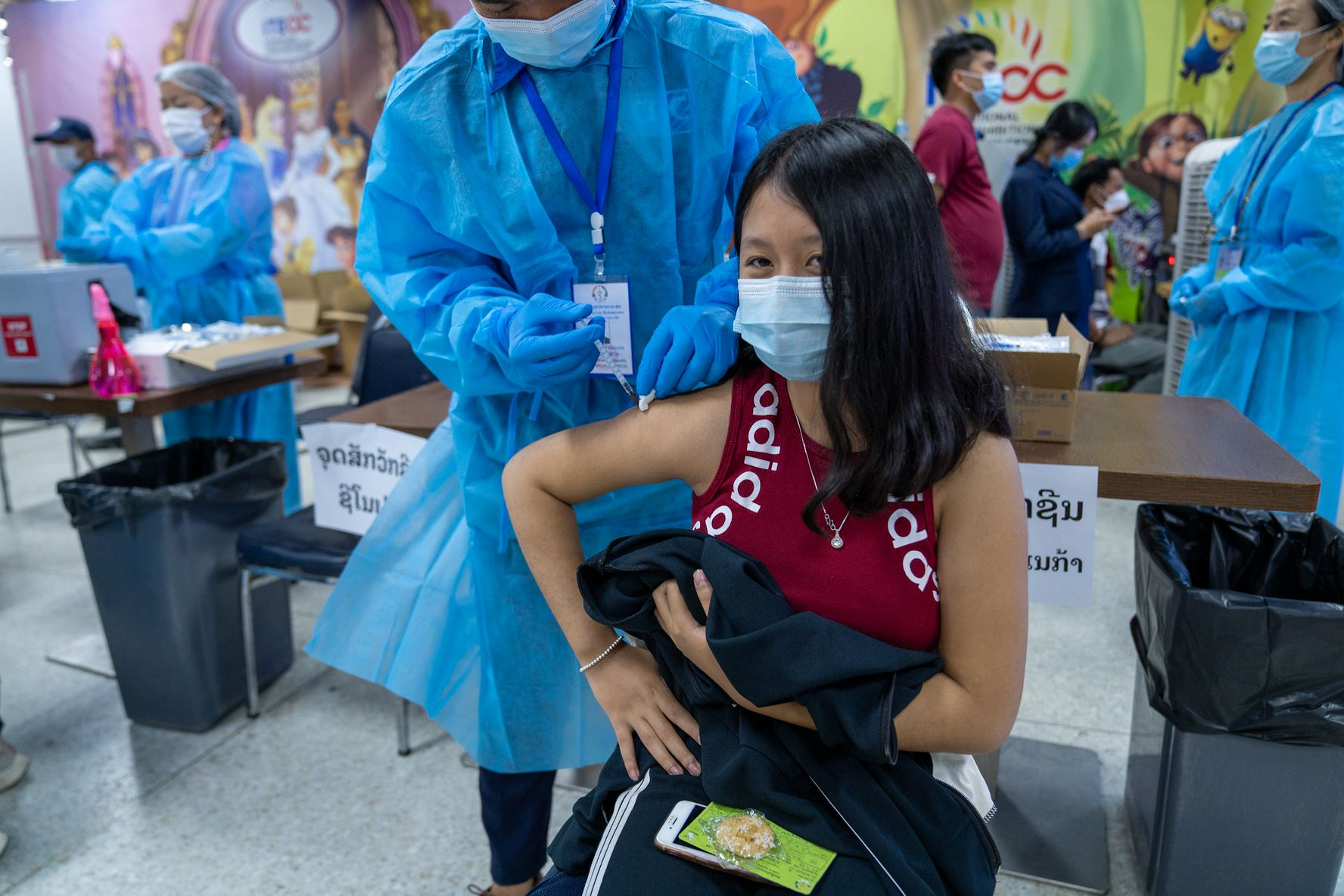
A girl receives a Pfizer pediatric vaccine donated by the United States

The Laotian Times says China sent medical experts, medical equipment and medicines, to help Laos fight COVID-19.

On 27 March, Vietnam offers help by sending medical equipment worth US$100,000.

In April 2021, the Vietnamese government decided to provide a financial aid of US$500,000 to fight against COVID disease, in addition to sending experts and supporting additional medical equipment for Laos. On 4 May 2021, Vietnam's Deputy Minister of Health Nguyen Truong Son and 32 experts departed for Laos to set up field hospitals, increase emergency resuscitation and strengthen testing capacity.

== Censorship ==
Some people have been arrested for allegedly spreading false information about the COVID-19 pandemic.
