= 1953 in Laos =

- Decades: 1930s; 1940s; 1950s; 1960s; 1970s
- See also: Other events of 1953; List of years in Laos

The following lists events that happened during 1953 in Laos.

== Incumbents ==
- Monarch: Sisavang Vong
- Prime Minister: Souvanna Phouma

== Events ==
=== November ===
- November 9 - The Laotian Civil War begins between the Kingdom of Laos and the Pathet Lao after Laos gains its independence from France.
