= Pakbeng =

Village in Oudomxay province, Laos

Coordinates: 19°51′0″N 101°33′0″E

Pakbeng (Lao: ປາກແບ່ງ, pronounced [pàːk bɛ̄ŋ]) is a small village in Laos, on the Mekong River, about halfway between the Thai border at Huay Xai and Luang Prabang, Laos. Pakbeng is connected by a sealed road with Oudomxay province along the Nam Beng River.

== Geography ==
Pakbeng had its main road paved in 2005 and also just completed a hydroelectric station downriver thanks to a World Bank loan. Before then, the town was dependent on electrical generators for electricity.

There is a small wat to be found in the hills not far from the village. It is an example of a Buddhist temple from the former Lan Na Kingdom. Many of the old temples had been destroyed during wars with the Thai Kingdom 300 years before.

== History ==
During the Laotian Civil War, Pakbeng was the southern terminus of the freshly constructed Route 46 from Yunnan Province, People's Republic of China.

== Tourism ==
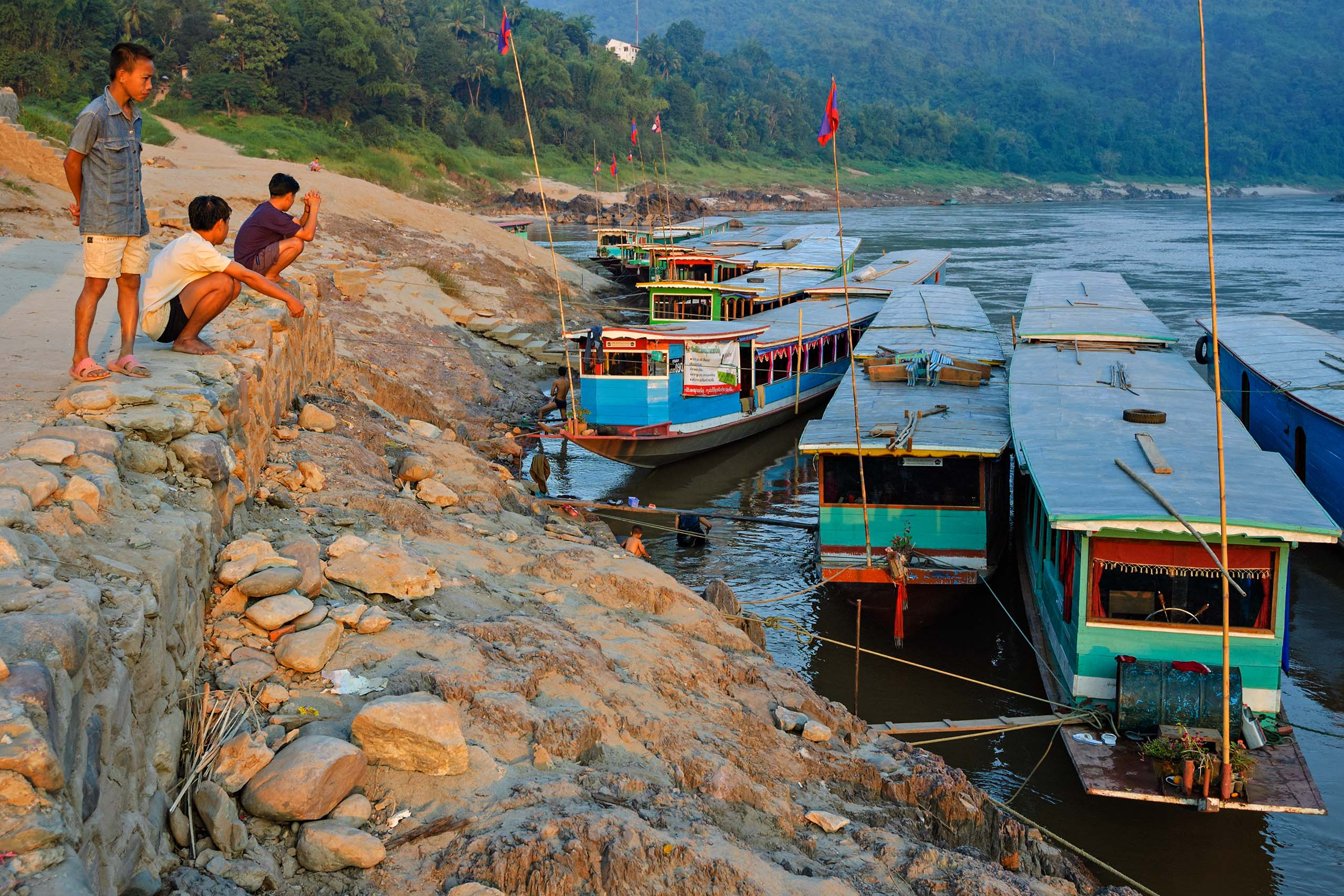
Pak Beng slow boats on the Mekong river bank at sunset, Laos

The town is the overnight stop for boats running between Luang Prabang and Huay Xai. The slow boats which run between Huay Xai and Luang Prabang over a period of two days spend the night moored in Pakbeng.

An elephant sanctuary was opened in November 2017 with four elephants: Mei-kham (48 years old female with more than 25 years as a working elephant in the forest), Kham-Khum (28 years old male with 20 years as a working elephant), Mae-Kham-Di (28 years old female, 15 years working in the forest) and Mae-Ping (21 years old female who was never used as a working elephant). The sanctuary has been built to create an alternative of the ancestral work of the elephants and the mahout who traditionally were working in the forest and protect the elephants from hard labor tasks.

== Gallery ==
Main street, Pakbeng

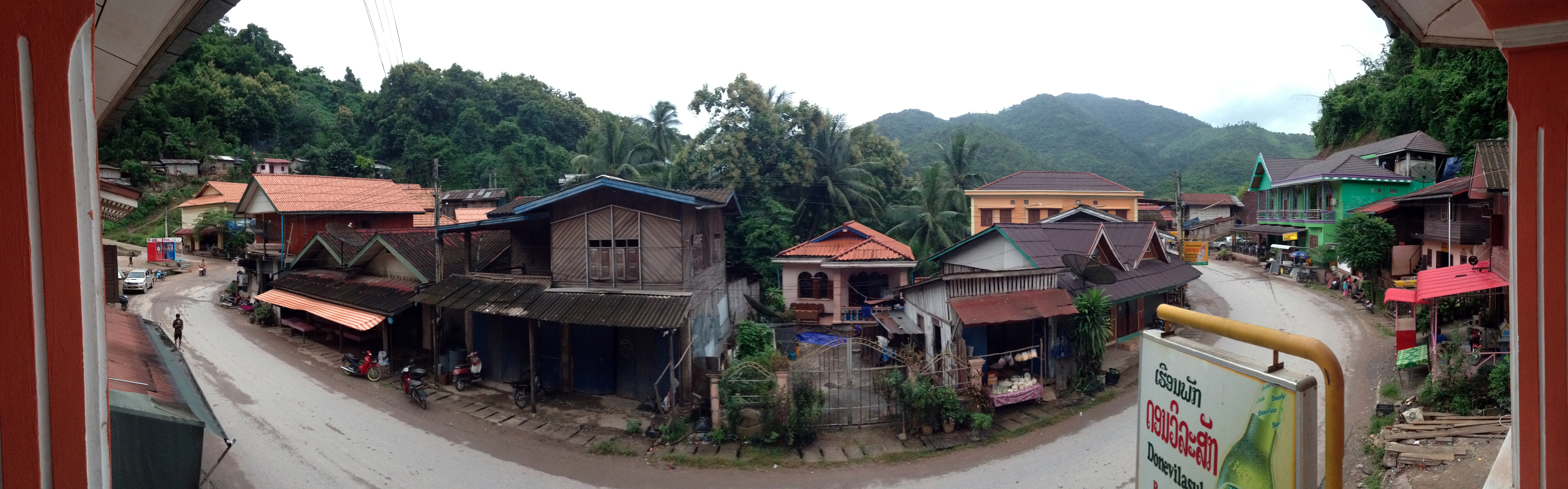
Panoramic view of Pakbeng's main street
