= 1952 in Laos =

- Decades: 1930s; 1940s; 1950s; 1960s; 1970s
- See also: Other events of 1952; List of years in Laos

The following lists events that happened during 1952 in Laos.

== Incumbents ==
- Monarch: Sisavang Vong
- Prime Minister: Souvanna Phouma

== Events ==
- date unknown - The Lao kip is introduced as the currency of Laos.

=== Births ===
- 17 February - Sombath Somphone
