= Battle of Luang Namtha =

- Part of Laotian Civil War
Date	January 1962 – May 1963
Location	Luang Namtha and surrounding area
Result	Victory for People's Army of Vietnam
Territorial changes	Northwestern Laos falls under Communist control

Belligerents
Kingdom of Laos; Republic of China; Supported by United States	North Vietnam (Laos) Pathet Lao; Supported by USSR

Commanders and leaders
(Kingdom of Laos) Phoumi Nosavan (Taiwan) Li Teng; Anthony Poshepny	

Units involved
(Kingdom of Laos) Groupement Tactique 2 Bataillon Infanterie 2 Bataillon Infanterie 1 Bataillon Infanterie 2 Bataillon Parachutiste 11 (Taiwan) Bataillon Speciale 111; Field Training Team 40	(North Vietnam) 316th Brigade; 305th Brigade; 339th Brigade

The Battle of Luang Namtha, fought between January 1962 and May 1963, was a series of clashes in the Laotian Civil War. It came about as a result of the turmoil following Laotian independence as a result of the First Indochina War with France. The Kingdom of Laos had foreign soldiers on its soil, and a political struggle in progress concerning those outside troops. Following a coup and counter-coup that left General Phoumi Nosavan in charge, the general decided on military action to settle the political issue of interlopers in Laos.

The slow motion battle began in far northwestern Laos, near its boundaries with the People's Republic of China, Burma, and Vietnam. Although the US, who had replaced the French as benefactors of the Lao, both objected and cut off his funding, Phoumi insisted on the action. Between January and May 1962, 5,000 Royalist troops were fed into Luang Namtha. The communists committed battle-hardened veterans of the People's Army of Vietnam (PAVN) to the battle.

On 6 May 1962, the Royalist defenses collapsed under an attack by four North Vietnamese battalions closing in from three directions. The panicked Lao troops fled down the Pak Beng Valley 150 kilometres (93 mi) to the Mekong River, and beyond. Phoumi's military action having failed, he joined a coalition government to remain in power.

Luang Namtha would remain in communist hands except for a few days in late December 1967, when a surprise raid by Royalist irregulars would occupy it temporarily.

== Background ==
The Kingdom of Laos emerged from the First Indochina War free of the French, but in a state of chaos. Even as the French pulled out of Laos, the US took up their advisory role to the Royal Lao Government through such agencies as the Programs Evaluation Office. Meanwhile, Vietnamese communists and Lao communists were active in Laos, sowing discontent against the government. The government itself was in turmoil, as various Lao soldiers and politicians scrambled for positions of power. The US became convinced that Laos could not be allowed to fall under communist control, lest other countries in Southeast Asia follow suit.

On 14 December 1960, General Phoumi Nosavan won control of the Kingdom of Laos in the Battle of Vientiane. Although he was backed by US covert operations, he did not want to await a political solution to the political turmoil in Laos. In a move to assert control over Lao territory, he authorized military operations in northwestern Laos near the Chinese, Burmese, and Vietnamese borders. In so doing, he hoped to force a military solution on the unsettled political situation in Laos.

== Battle ==
In January 1962, even as the Chinese Road pact was announced, the Royal Lao Army abandoned its occupation of Muang Xay, Laos. It withdrew into Luang Namtha, a village with about 1,800 inhabitants 24 kilometres (15 mi) from the Chinese border. The communist troops in the vicinity fired a few mortar rounds into the outskirts of the town. Royalist reinforcements were flown into Luang Namtha over the next few days, including four 105 mm howitzers and twelve 75 mm howitzers. T-6 Harvards from the Royal Lao Air Force operated from the unpaved airstrip there. Communist shelling beginning 1 February forced withdrawal of the T-6s to Luang Prabang. The US military attaché at that time deemed the topography of Luang Namtha too similar to that of Dien Ben Phu to be defensible.

By May, the PAVN moved in a battalion of their 316th Brigade. This invasion did not go unnoticed by the Royal Lao Government. They planned a two pronged response.

In September 1962, the Royal Lao Army formed an ad hoc regimental-size task force, Groupement Tactique 2 (GT2, Tactical Group 2) in Muong Houn, south of Muang Xay. Three Lao battalions were accompanied by U.S. Special Forces Field Training Team 40, which was stationed with them on a temporary duty training mission. Groupement Tactique 2's mission was to advance southeast up the Nam Beng Valley 82 kilometres (51 mi) to Muang Xay.

The other Royalist prong emanated from Luang Namtha. In October, Bataillon Infanterie 2 (Infantry Battalion 2), accompanied by U.S. Field Training Team 2, made a three-day eastward march to occupy Ban Namo. There they held up for a month, awaiting action from Groupement Tactique 2. On 2 December, they were reinforced by a fresh battalion, Bataillon Infanterie 1, as well as by Field Training Team 3.

GT 2, having undergone three months of training, kicked off its advance, but by 26 December had stalled halfway up the Pak Beng Valley. While the Special Forces tried to coax the column forward, the infantry battalion on the high ground screening the western flank fled after light contact by the communists. All but one company of the volunteer battalion comprising the main body of the expedition promptly followed suit. US advisers and the remaining Lao troops alike were left in a low-lying position that might easily be taken under plunging fire from the west.

At this juncture, Kuomintang General Li Teng led the Nationalist Chinese mercenary veterans who comprised Bataillon Speciale 111 (Special Battalion 111) down from their east flank hilltop. Bataillon Speciale 111 shielded the Americans for the next five days. On 31 December 1962, the Americans were extracted by helicopter and flown to the royal capital, Luang Prabang. The Lao volunteers dispersed into the countryside. The Chinese mercenaries headed westward toward northern Thailand, quitting the war.

On 21 January 1963, the other prong of the Royal Lao Army operation began to come apart. Bataillon Infanterie 2 (Infantry Battalion 2) ran from light probing fire from the PAVN. It was the turn of Bataillon Infanterie 1 (Infantry Battalion 1) the following day. The two US training teams were on their own. They were rescued by an Air America Sikorsky H-34 despite their dead radio.

The failure of this pincer movement did not end the siege of Luang Namtha. General Phoumi Nosavan was being pressured by his US allies to await a political solution to the situation. Although all economic aid to Phoumi was cut off, including his troops' payroll, he spent the next three months reinforcing his garrison in the town, eventually stationing 5,000 troops there. His final deployment there, the elite Bataillon Parachutiste 11 (11th Paratroop Battalion), gave him a numerical advantage in manpower over his enemy's 2,500 troops. By late April, his patrols began probing Pathet Lao and Neutralist forces.

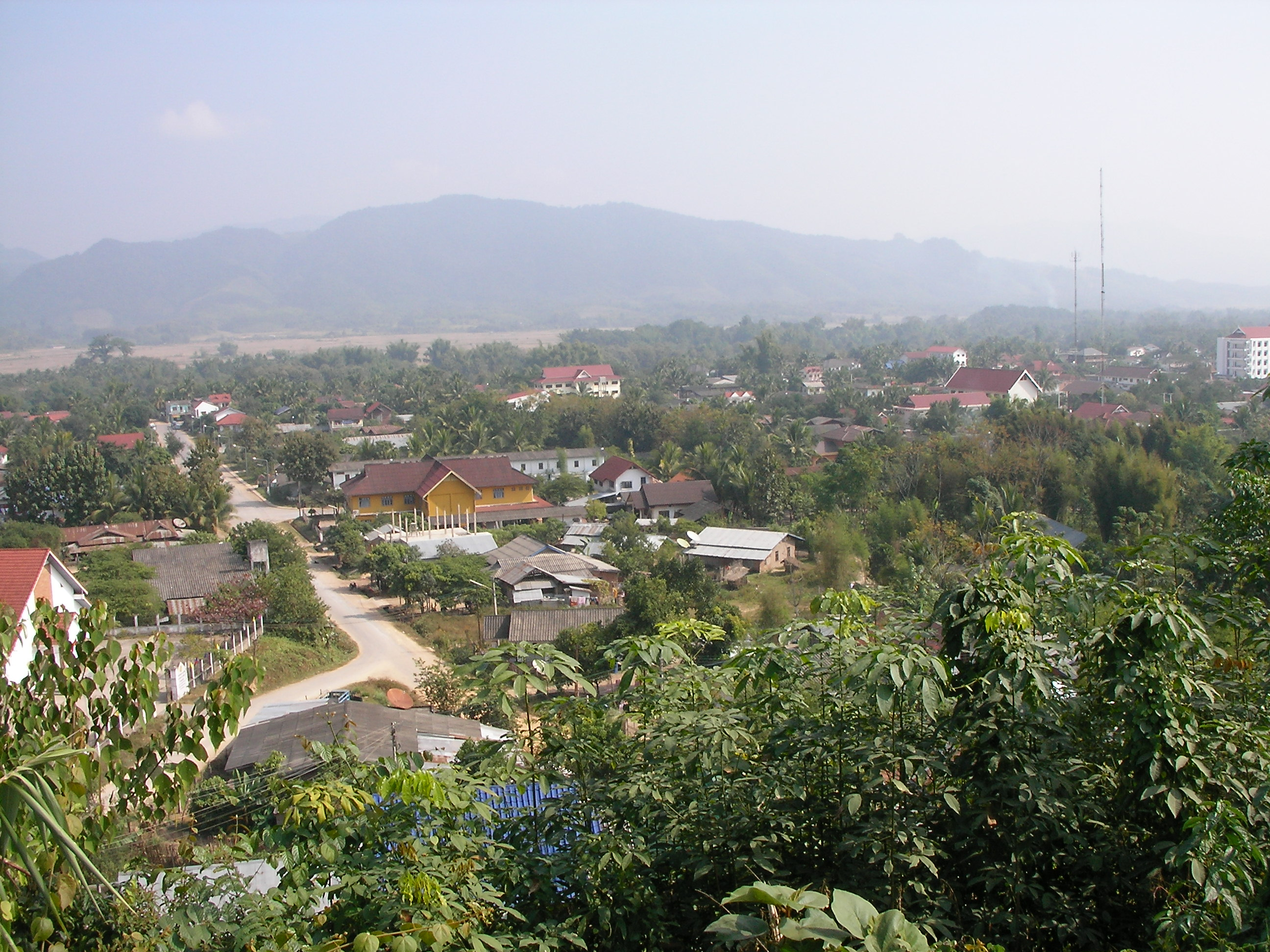
Luang Namtha as seen from the northwest. This would be the point of view of anyone approaching from Muang Sing

The communists, in a move they dubbed Operation XYZ, on 28 March detached seven battalions from the PAVN 305th, 339th, and 316th Brigades, as well as Pathet Lao supernumeraries. They joined a PAVN battalion already in Muang Sing. The reinforcements moved on Luang Namtha from surrounding towns and were supplied by transport aircraft of the Soviet Air Force and the Vietnamese People's Air Force. On 5 May 1962, communist troops ambushed one of the Royalist columns probing east of Luang Namtha. During their retreat, the soldiers of this column reported that they had been vanquished by PAVN troops. At 03:00 on 6 May, PAVN artillery fire fell upon the Royalist headquarters and its supporting artillery battery. A reported four battalions of PAVN simultaneously attacked from three directions. Panic spread throughout the Royalist positions. Royalist officers abandoned their posts and fled. The leaderless Royalist troops abandoned Luang Namtha and fled south down the Nam Beng Valley. Many of them did not stop until they reached the Mekong River, some 150 kilometres (93 mi) south of Luang Namtha. Some of them crossed the river and entered Thailand. The alarm spread by these deserters echoed back to the United States; President John F. Kennedy ordered 5,000 American troops to northern Thailand in response. The Royal Thai Army stationed several thousand troops along its bank of the Mekong in the vicinity of the Lao incursion.

The US Special Forces training team that had been attached to the Royalists at Luang Namtha was hastily evacuated via helicopter. The Pathet Lao and Neutralists captured 2,000 Royalist troops still in town, along with abandoned munitions and arms. The debacle not only left northwestern Laos in communist hands, but demonstrated the inability of Phoumi's Royal Lao Government to enforce its mandate, and led to a coalition government. In military terms, the Royal Lao Army had lost more than a third of its maneuver battalions, including its elite paratroops.

== A belated raid ==
In late December 1967, CIA case officer Tony Poe directed three battalions of Royalist irregulars in a raid upon Luang Namtha. The surprise move chased Pathet Lao defenders from the town. The Royalists held the town for two days while thousands of local civilians were evacuated, some by air and some by foot. As Pathet Lao forces regrouped east of town, the Royalists withdrew to the CIA base at Nam Yu, leaving Luang Namtha to the Pathet Lao.
