= Battle of Nam Bac =

Major engagement of the Laotian Civil War

- Part of Laotian Civil War
| Date | August 1966 – January 1968 |
| Location | Nam Bac Valley |
| Result | Victory for Communist forces |

Belligerents
| (Laos) Royal Lao Armed Forces: Royal Lao Army; Royal Lao Air Force; United States Thailand | People's Army of Vietnam (Laos) Pathet Lao |

Commanders and leaders
| (Laos) Savatphayphane Bounchanh (Laos) Khampai Sayasith (Laos) Vang Pao (United States) William H. Sullivan (United States) Theodore Shackley | ? |

Units involved
| (Laos) Mobile Group 11 (Laos) Mobile Group 25 (Laos) Mobile Group 27 (Laos) 26th Infantry Battalion (Laos) Paratroop Battalion 55 (Laos) 99th Paratroop Battalion (Laos) Mobile Group 1 (Laos) Thai mercenary pilots (Laos) Irregulars5; NAF Volunteer Battalion 2 (United States) Air Force bombers (United States) Air America support aircraft | 316th Division; 335th Independent Regiment; 41st Special Forces Battalion |

Strength
| 7,500 | 4,100 |

Casualties and losses
| 6,100; 2,400 captured | ? |

The Battle of Nam Bac was one of the major engagements of the Laotian Civil War. Despite misgivings about their potential performance the Royal Lao Army moved in to occupy the Nam Bac Valley in August 1966; the position would block a traditional Vietnamese invasion route that led to the Lao royal capitol, Luang Prabang.

The location was problematic. It was closer to the North Vietnamese border than to Luang Prabang; any Vietnamese communist invaders would also enjoy the use of Route 19 for part of their route to the valley. Nam Bac itself could only be resupplied by air from Luang Prabang, and its supply line was dependent upon use of an airstrip sited on low ground within artillery range of nearby heights. Those surrounding hilltop positions would have to be held if assaulted by invaders.

Both sides now began to gradually feed in reinforcements. One year later, in August 1967, the Vietnamese communists besieged the Royalist stronghold. Both sides now expedited reinforcements into the battle. The battle-hardened 316th Division, plus an independent regiment, moved in from North Vietnam to join the attack; they brought the North Vietnamese strength to about 4,100 soldiers. Opposing them by now were some 7,500 Royalist troops, including 3,000 irregulars. However, Royalist battle performance was poor. Coordination of close air support ranged from poor to disastrous. Air assets were in short supply as it was, but the Royalists refused to utilize all available air power after a friendly fire incident. Command and control communications within the defense functioned sporadically. The resupply system broke down, leaving some units under-equipped. Artillery support for the infantry was nonexistent or inadequate.

As the Royalist defense deteriorated, diversionary relief columns set out from both east and west of the besieged positions. Their progress was too slow however. Royalist troops under pressure began to desert their positions and evade to the south. General Bounchanh, the Royalist commander, left his headquarters and headed south. As the leaderless Royalist force dissolved, it suffered heavy casualties as the Vietnamese rounded up fleeing Lao soldiers. Ultimately, the Royal Lao Army would only muster 1,400 of the Nam Bac troops again. Conversely, over 600 of the Lao prisoners of war held by the Vietnamese would switch their allegiance away from the Royal Lao Government. Additionally, Lao material losses were high. In addition to uncounted small arms, they had left the communists seven howitzers, 49 recoilless rifles, 52 mortars, and copious ammunition.

== Background ==
While American troops in the Vietnam War fought communist guerrillas, in neighboring Laos the situation was much different. The People's Army of Vietnam invaded the Kingdom of Laos with regular army formations, while Lao guerrilla forces tried to expel them. In an unprecedented situation, the American Ambassador to Laos was granted presidential power to direct the war in Laos. The exercise of this power is most famously associated with William H. Sullivan and G. McMurtrie Godley.

== Preliminary movements ==
In 1961, the Royal Lao Army had moved out of the Nam Bac Valley north of the Lao royal capitol, Luang Prabang. The communist Pathet Lao moved in a couple of companies to occupy it. They would remain directly unchallenged until August 1966.

However, the CIA sponsored Auto Defense Choc militia training behind enemy lines, north of Nam Bac, in 1964. Raised without use of Thai or U.S. trainers, several companies of these guerrillas were operational by early 1965. In the west were five companies clustered in a makeshift battalion around Doi Saeng. Several camps were established just north of Nam Bac, around Lao Ta and Ban Pha Thong. In the far north, at Nam Houn in Phong Saly Province, there was a Hmong stronghold.

The origin of the plans to retake Nam Bac remains vague. Certainly, the Royal Lao Army's rout at Nam Tha was an unpromising precedent. However, the later Operation Triangle had been a success, if a pushover. CIA Station Chief Theodore Shackley claimed that the Army Attaché and other members of the American Embassy were pushing for a reoccupation of the valley. The Royal Lao Army staff noted that a stronghold at Nam Bac would block the traditional invasion route in northern Laos. Shackley turned to his resident expert for advice; he asked Bill Lair's opinion of the proposed operation. Lair recommended against the effort on two inter-related grounds.

One problem Lair pointed out was logistical. He believed that once the troops were emplaced, there would be no Royal Lao officer capable of keeping Nam Bac's front-line troops supplied with the necessities of war even if its airfield could be protected while the supplies were offloaded.

Another problem was terrain. Although Nam Bac appeared upon the map to be an ideal spot to establish a position blocking a communist advance on Luang Prabang, it would have to be supplied by air in the absence of any roads. Moreover, Nam Bac was closer to North Vietnam than to Luang Prabang. While it was a trackless 96 kilometres (60 mi) upriver north of Luang Prabang, it was only 64 kilometres (40 mi) downriver southwest of the Vietnamese border. Furthermore, for much of the 64 kilometres (40 mi), Route 19 also offered an easy entry for the invading Vietnamese. Thus Nam Bac could be more easily reinforced by the Vietnamese than by Lao Royalist troops.

The terrain at Nam Bac itself was unfavorable. The airfield needed for resupply was sited in the valley within artillery range of nearby hills. Those hills would have to be occupied by Lao troops. Lair concluded by stating that he thought offering the Vietnamese a fixed base like Nam Bac to assault was a recipe for disaster.

== Operation Prasane ==
Nevertheless, the preliminary Operation Prasane began several weeks later. On 18 July, Royal Lao Army troops were helilifted into the Nam Bac area, and found only light resistance. The Royalist troops reclaimed the Nam Bac Valley in July and August 1966 in a move sanctioned by the American Embassy and supported by the CIA's proprietary airline, Air America. While RLA Colonel Khampai Sayasith of Groupement Mobile 11 commanded the movement, overall command of the Nam Bac operation was held by General Savatphayphane Bounchanh. The nearly bloodless overrunning of the Nam Bac Valley was hailed as a great victory for the RLA. The North Vietnamese response was to truck troops to the end of Route 19 and march them in from there. The invaders infiltrated into the hills surrounding the Nam Bac Valley and began to dig fortifications. The siege had begun.

== Siege ==
In early 1967, RLA attempts to expand their stronghold were thwarted by the enemy. Two additional RLA regiments, Groupement Mobile 25 and Groupement Mobile 27 were transferred in from elsewhere in Laos as reinforcements. In turn, during July and August 1967, the communists reinforced their positions around Nam Bac. On 2 August 1967, Groupement Mobile 12 was also moved to Nam Bac. However, even in this rainy season, the North Vietnamese were active. On the 14th, RLA Bataillon d'Infanterie 26 (26th Infantry Battalion) was stationed 14 kilometres (8.7 mi) northeast of Nam; the North Vietnamese regulars attacked it and inflicted serious casualties. On 31 August, 11 kilometres (6.8 mi) south of Nam Bac at a position at Mok Lok, RLA troops were accidentally bombed by Royal Lao Air Force Thai mercenary pilots. The infantry fled the position. The error caused the RLA to call off usage of the Thai mercenaries, leaving close air support to the understrength contingent of Lao RLAF pilots. Nevertheless, Air America still flew logistical support, including hauling in aerial rockets to be used as ground-to-ground weapons in lieu of artillery. However, as the siege continued, the communists moved their own artillery onto the hills overlooking the valley and opened fire.

In September 1967, the royalists again reinforced, this time with an elite unit. Bataillon Parachutistes 55 (Paratroop Battalion 55) was withdrawn from its action against opium smugglers crossing the Burmese/Lao border, loaded into landing craft, hauled down the Mekong River, and flown from Luang Prabang to Nam Bac via C-47 for the last leg of their journey. They were shortly joined by a second Paratroop Battalion, Bataillon Parachutistes 1 (Paratroop Battalion 1), fresh out of retraining. Another regiment, Groupement Mobile 15 had also filtered into the Nam Bac positions. The RLA forces at and around Nam Bac now numbered about 7,500 men, including 3,000 irregulars. However, the Royalists were receiving insufficient supplies because of a shortage of RLAF helicopter pilots; they also lacked artillery support. They were besieged by about 4,100 communist troops.

In October 1967, as the dry season began, the Royalists tried to hang onto their positions while extending their lines a bit. On 7 October the communists drove Groupement Mobile 15 from their position to the southeast of Nam Bac. However, the RLA irregulars briefly captured Nam Thuam, and managed to seize another air strip at Muang Xay, but could only hold it until 3 November. Meantime, RLA forces outside the besieged valley mounted Operation Linkup. On 15 November, some of General Vang Pao's guerrillas were airlifted closer to the siege and began marching westward in a relief column.

In early December, before Vang Pao's Operation Linkup troops could arrive in Nam Bac, the North Vietnamese committed the entire battle-hardened PAVN 316th Division, along with part of the 335th Independent Regiment, to the battle. With a monthly combat casualty toll of 42 killed in action and 72 wounded in action, Bounchanh revamped the valley's defenses, which now included two 105 mm howitzers. A major resupply push began on 20 December. Additionally, diversionary actions were staged by guerrillas west of Nam Bac around Nam Tha, and Vang Pao increased manpower in his relief force to the east. Groupement Mobile 15 was helilifted to meet them. Then too, one more reinforcement battalion, Bataillon Volontaire 2 (Volunteer Battalion 2) of non-royalist allies, Forces Armees Neutralistes (Neutral Army Forces), was helioed to the junction of the Nam Ou and Nam Nga rivers, about halfway between Luang Prabang and Nam Bac.

During the year, Shackley authored an embassy position paper entitled U. S. Policy in Northern Laos. It called for a Royalist occupation of positions along a northern defensive line running west to east along the axis Muong Sing – Muong Sai – Nam Bac – Phou Pha Thi. The position paper cautioned, "Refrain from actions which could provoke serious enemy retaliation".

== End ==
In an attempt to break the siege, U.S. Air Force fighter-bombers flew air interdiction strikes against supplies funneling in on Route 19. The RLAF managed to station seven T-28 Trojans at Luang Prabang for close air support. Lack of a forward air control system limited the usefulness of these air assets, however. The RLAF custom of bombing general areas instead of specific targets vitiated their impact. Ill-trained RLA officers were known to accidentally call in air strikes on their own men. Despite outside diversions and continuing reinforcements, the Nam Bac strongpoint was on a downward slide. By the first week of 1968, RLA forces had ceased patrolling outside their defensive perimeter. The ground outside their positions was ceded to the communists. A single communist 82mm mortar closed the Nam Bac airstrip with its shelling; Air America's C-123 Providers turned to parachuting supplies in to the garrison. The North Vietnamese moved mortars and heavy machine guns onto the hilltops overlooking the valley to take it under fire. Tactical air strikes failed to silence these guns.

On 11 January 1968, the North Vietnamese 41st Dac Cong Battalion (41st Special Forces Battalion) attacked the northern outskirts of Luang Prabang. While the RLA was distracted by this diversion, the PAVN 148th Regiment of the 316th Division launched an all-out attack from the north of Nam Bac, while a battalion from the 335th Independent Regiment bored in from the west. Bounchanh decided to move his threatened headquarters and its two supporting howitzers from a perilous location adjacent to the airstrip, to the nearby hilltop village of Ban Houei Ngat. He failed to notify Air America of the move; they continued to drop vital supplies into the abandoned valley. During this turmoil, the 99th Bataillon Parachutistes (99th Paratroop Battalion) was inserted as reinforcements.

On 13 January 1968, the 148th Regiment menaced the RLA headquarters. General Bounchanh believed the Nam Bac Valley had already fallen to the communists; he hastily fled southwards, to be plucked from the jungle via helicopter two days later. With no leadership or central node of communication organizing the defense, the RLA strongpoint disintegrated. Within a day, the troopers belonging to three of the regiments—Groupement Mobile 11, Groupement Mobile 12, and Groupement Mobile 25—had abandoned their positions and drifted south toward Luang Prabang. That left only Groupement Mobile 15 and the 99th Bataillon Parachutistes facing the communist attack. The PAVN 316th Division now unleashed a weapon previously unknown in Laos, when they rained 122mm DKZ rockets on Groupement Mobile 15. The RLA regiment withdrew without notifying the 99th Bataillon Parachutistes. The latter were left by themselves to try to withstand the overwhelming communist onslaught. Only 13 of the paratroopers survived the battle, the rest being killed in action or captured. By the 14th of January, the siege had been broken and the Royal Lao Army routed. American helicopters began plucking fleeing Lao troops from the jungle.

== Aftermath ==
The 99th Bataillon Parachutistes was not the only Royalist unit to be nearly wiped out; Groupement Mobile 25 took nearly as severe casualties. All the other RLA units committed to Nam Bac also suffered heavy losses. Groupement Mobile 12 lost three-quarters of its personnel. Both Groupement Mobile 11 and Groupement Mobile 15 lost half. By 1 February, the Royal Lao Army could only muster 1,400 survivors of Nam Bac. Even the unsuccessful relief force moving in from the east took 70 casualties. The blood cost and prisoners lost to captivity were not the only damages done to the Royal Lao Army. In artillery alone, they had lost seven howitzers, 49 recoilless rifles, 52 mortars, plus extensive stores of ammunition to the communists, who promptly moved their booty upriver. There was no count given of the small arms lost.

The Royalists scrambled to put up a new defense line north of Luang Prabang to protect the royal capitol, with little success. Meanwhile, the communists struggled to absorb their bounty. A great deal of it was human, as most of the RLA troopers had been captured by an encircling maneuver by the 174th Regiment, rather than killed or wounded in combat. Some 2,400 RLA prisoners were marched off to the Vietnamese border to build seven prison camps 2 kilometres (1.2 mi) from one another. Some 600 of these prisoners would switch sides rather than return to RLA combat service, and serve as porters and road builders for the communists. Others would join the Patriotic Neutralists, a Lao force allied to the communists but doing little fighting.

The defeat shattered the Royal Lao Army's morale. The finger pointing in its wake was extensive. The CIA officers on scene—Richard Secord, Tom Clines, Bill Lair, Pat Landry—believed their boss, Ted Shackley was responsible for the debacle. Shackley claimed that the Army Attaché should not have entertained the scheme when it was proposed by the RLA General Staff. Ambassador William H. Sullivan had not been in Laos during the last several weeks of the siege. Nevertheless, Sullivan was a micro-manager of the war, involving himself in even minor tactical situations. Differing sources claim a variety of reactions from him concerning the defeat. One source says not only that Sullivan believed the RLA was responsible, but that he knew from the start "it was going to be a fiasco". Another says he blamed his CIA subordinates. Obviously, however, Sullivan had total command of the munitions and supplies needed to wage war in Laos, and did not use that veto power to prevent the Battle of Nam Bac.

No matter whose the responsibility for the defeat, the annihilation of the Royal Lao Army tipped the balance of power in Laos towards the Vietnamese communists. Indeed, the Royal Lao Army was left with only six of its 11 makeshift Groupe Mobile regiments intact.
