= Deaths in July 2009 =

The following is a list of deaths in July 2009.

Entries for each day are listed alphabetically by surname. A typical entry lists information in the following sequence:

- Name, age, country of citizenship at birth, subsequent country of citizenship (if applicable), reason for notability, cause of death (if known), and reference.

== July 2009 ==
=== 1 ===
- Alexis Argüello, 57, Nicaraguan former triple world champion boxer and politician, mayor of Managua, suspected suicide by gunshot.
- Marwa El-Sherbini, 31, Egyptian pharmacist and vilification victim, stabbed.
- Karl Malden, 97, American actor (A Streetcar Named Desire, On the Waterfront, The Streets of San Francisco), Oscar winner (1952).
- Anna Karen Morrow, 94, American actress (Peyton Place), natural causes.
- John Henry Moss, 90, American baseball executive (South Atlantic League), mayor of Kings Mountain, North Carolina.
- Onni Palaste, 91, Finnish soldier and writer, Winter War veteran, natural causes.
- David Pears, 87, British philosopher.
- Baltasar Porcel, 72, Spanish Catalan writer, cancer.
- Andree Layton Roaf, 68, American jurist, first black woman on Arkansas Supreme Court.
- Mollie Sugden, 86, British actress (Are You Being Served?), heart failure.
- Rupert Thorneloe, 39, British soldier, Commanding Officer of the 1st Battalion Welsh Guards, improvised explosive device.
- Norman Welton, 81, American journalist, photo editor for the Associated Press, colon cancer.
- Jean Yoyotte, 81, French Egyptologist.
- Lyudmila Zykina, 80, Russian singer, Hero of Socialist Labor, cardiac arrest.

=== 2 ===
- Adésio, 76, Brazilian footballer.
- Pasquale Borgomeo, 76, Vatican director of Radio Vatican, after long illness.
- Steve Brennan, 57, Irish-born American reporter and editor (The Hollywood Reporter), cancer.
- M. K. Chandrashekaran, 71, Indian zoologist, after brief illness.
- Susan Fernandez, 52, Filipina activist and singer, ovarian cancer.
- Kaj Hansen, 68, Danish football player.
- Martin Hengel, 82, German theologian.
- Colin Hillman, 46, Welsh rugby player and coach, pancreatic cancer.
- Herb Klein, 91, American journalist, White House Communications Director for President Richard Nixon.
- Tyeb Mehta, 83, Indian painter, heart attack.
- David Morley, 86, British paediatrician.
- James Oluleye, 79, Nigerian army general and politician.
- Robert Daniel Potter, 86, American judge, member of the District Court for the Western District of North Carolina (1981–1994).
- Petro Ruçi, 52, Albanian football player (Flamurtari, national team).
- Bert Schneider, 71, Austrian Grand Prix motorcycle racer.
- Clyde Shugart, 92, American football player (Washington Redskins), stroke.
- Robert E. L. Taylor, 96, American publisher and chairman of the Philadelphia Bulletin.

=== 3 ===
- Jorge Enrique Adoum, 83, Ecuadorian poet and writer.
- Alauddin Al-Azad, 77, Bangladeshi author, natural causes.
- John Barry, 84, American president and CEO of WD-40, pulmonary fibrosis.
- John Blackburn, 84, American administrator (University of Alabama), myelodysplastic syndrome.
- Frank Devine, 77, New Zealand-born Australian newspaper editor, after long illness.
- Charles K. Eastman, 79, American screenwriter and script doctor, heart disease.
- Gabriel Fino Noriega, 42, Honduran journalist, shot.
- E. J. Josey, 85, American librarian and civil rights activist, natural causes.
- John Keel, 79, American ufologist and writer (The Mothman Prophecies), heart failure.
- Barbara Margolis, 79, American prisoners' rights advocate, official greeter for New York City, cancer.
- Victor Smorgon, 96, Ukrainian-born Australian industrialist, natural causes.

=== 4 ===
- Jean-Pierre Aguilar, 48, French entrepreneur, co-founder and CEO of Capital Fund Management, gliding accident.
- Jim Chapin, 89, American jazz drummer.
- Robert E. Hopkins, 94, American optical engineer.
- Brenda Joyce, 92, American actress (Tarzan and the Amazons).
- Béla Király, 97, Hungarian general and historian, natural causes.
- Allen Klein, 77, American businessman, Beatles and Rolling Stones manager, Alzheimer's disease.
- Drake Levin, 62, American guitarist (Paul Revere & the Raiders), cancer.
- Robert Louis-Dreyfus, 63, French-born Swiss billionaire, leukemia.
- Steve McNair, 36, American football player (Tennessee Titans, Baltimore Ravens), shot.
- Hugh Millais, 79, British actor and adventurer.
- Robert Mitchell, 96, American organist, pneumonia.
- Khan Mohammad, 81, Pakistani cricketer, prostate cancer.
- Leo Mol, 94, Ukrainian-born Canadian sculptor.
- Lasse Strömstedt, 74, Swedish writer.
- Jean-Baptiste Tati Loutard, 70, Congolese politician, Minister of State.
- Laurence Villiers, 7th Earl of Clarendon, 76, British aristocrat.

=== 5 ===
- John Bachar, 52, American rock climber, fall.
- Peter Blaker, Baron Blaker, 86, British diplomat and politician, MP for Blackpool South (1964–1992), pneumonia.
- Lou Creekmur, 82, American football player (Detroit Lions) and member of the Pro Football Hall of Fame.
- Alfonso de Andrés, 71, Spanish Olympic athlete.
- Takeo Doi, 89, Japanese psychoanalyst.
- Harry Elliot, 89, British space scientist.
- Alfred John Ellory, 89, British flautist.
- Mihai Iacob, 76, Romanian film director.
- Naomi Lewis, 97, British poet.
- Oscar Murton, Baron Murton of Lindisfarne, 95, British politician, MP for Poole (1964–1979).
- John Orman, 60, American professor and politician, self-appointed chairman of Connecticut for Lieberman party.
- Bob Titchenal, 91, American football player and coach.
- Waldo Von Erich, 75, Canadian professional wrestler, fall.

=== 6 ===
- Vasily Aksyonov, 76, Russian novelist, stroke.
- Mihai Baicu, 33, Romanian footballer, heart attack.
- Patrick Tracy Burris, 41, American criminal, suspected South Carolina spree killer, shot.
- Rene Capo, 48, Cuban-born American Olympic judoka (1988, 1996), lung cancer.
- Johnny Collins, 71, British folk singer.
- Marlon Green, 80, American pilot.
- Oscar G. Mayer Jr., 95, American business executive (Oscar Mayer).
- Robert McNamara, 93, American business executive, Secretary of Defense (1961–1968), natural causes.
- Mathieu Montcourt, 24, French tennis player, cardiac arrest.
- Jim Reid, 75, British folk musician, after short illness.
- Robert L. Short, 76, American theologian (The Gospel According to Peanuts).
- Martin Streek, 45, Canadian disc jockey, suspected suicide.
- Bleddyn Williams, 86, British rugby player, captain of Wales and British Lions, after long illness.

=== 7 ===
- Anabaa, 17, American Thoroughbred racehorse, peritonitis after undergoing surgery from colic.
- Mikhail Bachvarov, 73, Bulgarian Olympic sprinter.
- Richard Reader Harris, 96, British businessman and politician, MP for Heston and Isleworth (1950–1970).
- John Marshall, 77, American sculptor.

=== 8 ===
- John Fairey, 74, English aviator, plane crash.
- Harry Gray, 89, American CEO and chairman of United Technologies Corporation.
- Bertha Hertogh, 72, Dutch woman whose adoption led to ethnic riots in Singapore in 1950, leukemia.
- Robert Isabell, 57, American event planner, heart attack.
- Edward Kenna, 90, Australian soldier, recipient of the Victoria Cross.
- Judi Ann Mason, 54, American screenwriter, television producer (Good Times) and playwright, aortic dissection.
- Waldo McBurney, 106, American beekeeper, oldest worker in the United States.
- Nelson Munsey, 61, American football player (Baltimore Colts), heart disease.
- Edgar O'Ballance, 90, British military historian.
- Lou Pagliaro, 90, American table tennis player, national champion (1940–1942, 1952).
- Yury Shlyapin, 77, Russian water polo player, Olympic bronze medalist (1956).

=== 9 ===
- William C. Conner, 89, American federal judge (District Court for the Southern District of New York).
- Magomed Gadaborshev, Russian Colonel, Head of Ingushetia Forensics and Investigations Center, shot.
- George Haig, 2nd Earl Haig, 91, British Army officer, patron of military charities and artist.
- Jessie Hollins, 39, American baseball player, drowned.
- Ron Kennedy, 56, Canadian ice hockey player and trainer, brain cancer.
- Frank Mickens, 63, American educator, natural causes.
- Kinuthia Murugu, Kenyan Permanent Secretary, shot.
- Henri Verbrugghe, 79, Belgian Olympic canoer.

=== 10 ===
- John Caldwell, 71, Irish boxer, Olympic medalist (1956), world bantamweight champion (1961–1962), cancer.
- Sir Edward Downes, 85, British conductor, assisted suicide.
- Ebba Haslund, 91, Norwegian author.
- Jack B. Horner, 87, American politician.
- Patrick J. McManus, 54, American politician, Mayor of Lynn, Massachusetts (1992–2001).
- Frank Seipelt, 48, German Olympic weightlifter (1984, 1988 and 1992 Olympics), motor vehicle accident.
- Edward Durell Stone Jr., 76, American landscape architect.
- Zena Marshall, 83, Kenyan-born British actress (Dr. No), after short illness.

=== 11 ===
- Maria del Carmen Bousada de Lara, 69, Spanish woman believed to be world's oldest mother, cancer.
- Manuel Carrascalão, 75, East Timorese politician, cerebral embolism.
- Robert 'Dolly' Dunn, 68, Australian child molester, multiple organ failure.
- Reg Fleming, 73, Canadian hockey player (Chicago Blackhawks).
- Arturo Gatti, 37, Canadian boxer, strangulation.
- Paul Hemphill, 73, American author, throat cancer.
- Ji Xianlin, 97, Chinese linguist, paleographer, historian and writer, heart attack.
- Lawyer Ron, 6, American Thoroughbred racehorse, complications after colic surgery.
- Mark Mandala, 72, American television executive, president of ABC (1986–1994), heart attack.
- Žan Marolt, 44, Bosnia-Herzegovinian actor.
- Geraint Owen, 43, British actor, cerebral haemorrhage.
- Cecil Smith, 92, American television and drama critic, journalist, screenwriter, television host, and World War II bomber pilot, congestive heart failure.

=== 12 ===
- Doris Barr, 87, Canadian baseball player, original member of All-American Girls Professional Baseball League.
- Charles N. Brown, 72, American founding editor of Locus magazine.
- Vinod Chaubey, 49, Indian police officer, shot in the Rajnandgaon ambush.
- Tommy Cummings, 80, British football player (Burnley F.C.).
- James Klass, 43, British DJ, colon cancer.
- Donald MacCormick, 70, British television journalist, heart attack.
- Shesha Palihakkara, 81, Sri Lankan dancer, actor and producer.
- Christopher Prout, Baron Kingsland, 67, British politician and barrister, MEP (1979–1994), pulmonary embolism.
- S. G. Sender, 78, Belgian pastry chef, after long illness.
- Pavel Smeyan, 52, Russian singer and actor, cancer.
- Nikola Stanchev, 78, Bulgarian wrestler, Olympic gold medalist.
- Simon Vinkenoog, 80, Dutch poet and writer.
- Jane Weinberger, 91, American author, widow of Caspar Weinberger, stroke.

=== 13 ===
- Uma Aaltonen, 68, Finnish author, journalist and politician.
- Amin al-Hafez, 83, Lebanese politician, Prime Minister (1973).
- Giuseppe Alessi, 103, Italian politician, President of Sicily (1947–1949, 1955–1956).
- Robert Cushman, 62, American photograph curator (Academy of Motion Picture Arts and Sciences).
- Neil Munro, 62, Canadian director, actor and playwright, after long illness.
- Nilu Phule, 79, Indian Marathi and Hindi film actor, esophageal cancer.
- Vince Powell, 80, British scriptwriter (Love Thy Neighbour, Mind Your Language).
- Beverly Roberts, 96, American actress, natural causes.
- Don Schneider, 86, American football player (Buffalo Bills).
- Dash Snow, 27, American artist, heroin overdose.

=== 14 ===
- Pat Brady, 82, American football player (Pittsburgh Steelers), lymphoma.
- Lucio Ceccarini, 78, Italian water polo player.
- Sam Church, 72, American labor leader (UMWA), complications of surgery.
- Joe DiGangi, 94, American bullpen catcher (New York Yankees), natural causes.
- John Fautenberry, 46, American serial killer, execution by lethal injection.
- Phyllis Gotlieb, 83, Canadian science fiction author,
- Christopher Hipp, 47, American inventor (blade server) and entrepreneur, suspected embolism.
- Dallas McKennon, 89, American actor and voice actor (Gumby, Buzz Buzzard, Archie Andrews), natural causes.
- Kujtim Majaci, 47, Albanian footballer, heart attack.
- Heinrich Schweiger, 77, Austrian actor, cardiovascular disease.
- Muzaffer Tokaç, 86, Turkish footballer.
- Jean Sommeng Vorachak, 76, Laotian Apostolic Vicar of Savannakhet.
- Bill Young, 95, New Zealand politician and diplomat.
- Zbigniew Zapasiewicz, 74, Polish actor and director.

=== 15 ===
- Avraham Ahituv, 78, German-born Israeli intelligence chief, Director of the Shin Bet (1974–1980).
- Khursheed Kamal Aziz, 81, Pakistani historian.
- Seddon Bennington, 61, New Zealand chief executive of the Museum of New Zealand Te Papa Tongarewa, hypothermia.
- Jacques de Champlain, 71, Canadian medical researcher, heart attack.
- Levon Davidian, 65, Iranian psychiatrist and politician, member of the parliament of Iran (2000-2004), plane crash.
- Adama Drabo, 75-76, Malian filmmaker and playwright.
- Natalya Estemirova, 51, Russian human rights activist in Chechnya and Ingushetia, shot.
- Klára Fried-Bánfalvi, 78, Hungarian Olympic bronze medal-winning (1960) sprint canoeist.
- Brian Goodwin, 78, Canadian mathematician, fall from a bicycle.
- Julius Shulman, 98, American architectural photographer.

=== 16 ===
- Joseph Henry Burgess, 62, American fugitive and murderer, gunshot wounds.
- Thomas Dao, 88, Chinese-born American physician, expert in breast cancer treatment, Pick's Disease.
- Leslie Fernandez, 91, British WW2 Special Forces saboteur and trainer of Violette Szabó.
- Charles Gonthier, 80, Canadian jurist, Supreme Court Justice (1989–2003).
- Maurice Grimaud, 95, French police chief of Paris during the 1968 student uprising.
- Otto Heino, 94, American ceramicist and potter, acute renal failure.
- Jerry Holland, 54, American-born Canadian fiddler and composer, cancer.
- Paulo Lopes de Faria, 78, Brazilian archbishop of Diamantina.
- Bud Marshall, 67, American football player.
- Ron G. Mason, 92, English oceanographer.
- D. K. Pattammal, 90, Indian Carnatic singer, after short illness.
- Angelo Rizzo, 83, Italian archbishop of Ragusa.
- María Elvira Salvo, 104, Uruguayan media entrepreneur and philanthropist.
- Ashraf W. Tabani, 79, Pakistani businessman and politician, Governor of Sindh (1987–1988).
- Yury Verlinsky, 65, Russian medical researcher, colorectal cancer.

=== 17 ===
- Meir Amit, 88, Israeli major general and politician.
- Gordon Burn, 61, British writer, cancer.
- Walter Cronkite, 92, American television news anchor, cerebrovascular disease.
- Richard H. Hall, 78, American ufologist, colon cancer.
- Vladimir Ilyin, 81, Soviet football player.
- Jim Kirby, 86, American baseball player.
- Leszek Kołakowski, 81, Polish philosopher, historian of ideas and essayist.
- Jean Margéot, 93, Mauritian cardinal.
- Gordon Waller, 64, British singer (Peter and Gordon), cardiac arrest.

=== 18 ===
- Henry Allingham, 113, British supercentenarian, world's oldest man and World War I veteran.
- Annagul Annakuliyeva, 84, Turkmen opera singer and actress.
- Jill Balcon, 84, British actress, widow of Cecil Day-Lewis and mother of Daniel Day-Lewis, brain tumour.
- Yasmine Belmadi, 33, French actor, traffic collision.
- Lionel Casson, 94, American professor of Classics (New York University), author on ancient maritime history, pneumonia.
- Roberta Hill, 73, American obsessed cinephile.
- Ricardo Londoño, 59, Colombian racing driver, shot.
- Denis Redman, 99, British army general.
- Steven Rothenberg, 50, American studio executive (Lions Gate Entertainment, Artisan Entertainment), stomach cancer.
- Graham Stanton, 69, New Zealand-born British theologian.
- Robert Uffen, 85, Canadian geophysicist.
- Joel Weisman, 66, American physician and pioneer in AIDS detection, heart disease.

=== 19 ===
- Sue Burns, 58, American businesswoman, principal owner of the San Francisco Giants, lung cancer.
- Alan Garnett Davenport, 76, Canadian engineer.
- Karen Harup, 84, Danish swimmer, Olympic champion (1948).
- Ingeborg Hunzinger, 94, German sculptor.
- Frank McCourt, 78, Irish-American author (Angela's Ashes), melanoma.
- Gilberto Mestrinho, 81, Brazilian Governor of Amazonas (1959–1963, 1983–1987, 1991–1995), lung cancer.
- Cecil Mountford, 90, New Zealand rugby league player and coach.
- Frank Rickwood, 88, Australian oil executive.
- Guillermo Schulenburg, 93, Mexican Abbot of the Basilica of Our Lady of Guadalupe (1963–1996), natural causes.
- Ray Shaw, 75, American journalist and work (American City Business Journals), complications from a wasp sting.
- Bryan Stanley, 83, British trade unionist, General Secretary of the Post Office Engineering Union.
- Henry Surtees, 18, British racing driver, Formula Two race accident.
- Ebbe Wallén, 92, Swedish Olympic bobsledder.

=== 20 ===
- Gene Amondson, 65, American politician, Prohibition Party nominee for U.S. President, stroke.
- Gretel Bolliger, 87, Swiss Olympic athlete Gretel Bolliger
- Ria Brieffies, 52, Dutch singer (Dolly Dots), lung cancer.
- Edward T. Hall, 95, American anthropologist.
- Bobby Knoxall, 75, British comedian.
- Vedat Okyar, 64, Turkish journalist and footballer (Beşiktaş J.K.), colorectal cancer.
- Stan Polley, 87, American music manager.
- H. James Starr, 78, American politician.
- Paul Fouad Tabet, 79, Lebanese archbishop, Nuncio to Greece (1996–2005).
- Gösta Werner, 101, Swedish film director.
- Carl Willey, 78, American baseball player (Milwaukee Braves, New York Mets), lung cancer.

=== 21 ===
- Stacy Barnett, 22, American murder victim.
- John Dawson, 64, American musician (New Riders of the Purple Sage), stomach cancer.
- Armando del Moral, 93, Spanish-born American film journalist, natural causes.
- Nelson Demarco, 84, Uruguayan basketball player, Olympic bronze medalist (1952, 1956).
- Heinz Edelmann, 75, Czech-born German illustrator and designer, heart disease and renal failure.
- Gidget, 15, American chihuahua, Taco Bell mascot, stroke.
- John Goosey, 21, American murder victim.
- Gangubai Hangal, 96, Indian Hindustani classical singer, cardiac arrest.
- Marcel Jacob, 45, Swedish musician, suicide.
- Yoshinori Kanada, 57, Japanese animator (My Neighbor Totoro, Princess Mononoke, Castle in the Sky), heart attack.
- Les Lye, 84, Canadian actor and broadcaster (You Can't Do That on Television).
- Hiroshi Wakasugi, 74, Japanese orchestra conductor, multiple organ dysfunction syndrome.

=== 22 ===
- Howard Engle, 89, American pediatrician, lead plaintiff in landmark tobacco lawsuit, lymphoma.
- Richard M. Givan, 88, American judge, Chief Justice of the Indiana Supreme Court (1969–1994).
- Peter Krieg, 61, German documentary filmmaker.
- Mark Leduc, 47, Canadian boxer, Olympic silver medalist (1992), heat stroke.
- Herbert Morris, 94, American rower, Olympic gold medalist (1936).
- Marco Antonio Nazareth, 23, Mexican boxer, cerebral hemorrhage.
- Billy Parks, 61, American football player, melanoma.
- Lynn Pressman Raymond, 97, American president of Pressman Toy Corporation.
- John Ryan, 88, British cartoonist (Captain Pugwash).
- Damian Steele, 33, American professional wrestler, brain aneurysm.
- Aygyl Tajiyeva, 64, Turkmen politician and opposition activist, stroke.

=== 23 ===
- Virginia Carroll, 95, American actress and model, natural causes.
- E. Lynn Harris, 54, American author.
- Conyers Herring, 94, American physicist.
- Talis Kitsing, 33, Estonian reality TV star.
- Danny McBride, 63, American singer-songwriter and guitarist (Sha Na Na), natural causes.
- Duse Nacaratti, 67, Brazilian actress, respiratory failure.
- Thomas N. Schroth, 88, American editor (Congressional Quarterly), founder of The National Journal, heart failure.

=== 24 ===
- José Carlos da Costa Araújo, 47, Brazilian goalkeeper, reserve at 1990 World Cup, abdominal cancer.
- Omar Dani, 85, Indonesian Commander of the National Air Force (1962–1965).
- Friedrich Goldmann, 68, German composer and conductor.
- Austin Gresham, 84, British pathologist.
- G. Alexander Heard, 92, American presidential advisor, Chancellor of Vanderbilt University (1963–1982).
- John Panton, 92, Scottish golfer.
- Sir Edward Peck, 93, British diplomat, Permanent Representative to NATO (1970–1975).
- Harry Towb, 83, British actor, cancer.
- Jack Le Goff, 78 , French equestrian

=== 25 ===
- Yasmin Ahmad, 51, Malaysian film director, brain hemorrhage.
- Rick Bryan, 47, American football player (Atlanta Falcons), heart attack.
- Gladys Bustamante, 97, Jamaican trade unionist and activist, wife of Prime Minister Alexander Bustamante.
- Alexis Cohen, 25, American singer, American Idol contestant, hit-and-run.
- Vernon Forrest, 38, American former world welterweight and super welterweight (light middleweight) champion boxer, shot.
- Gerald Gardner, 83, Irish-born American mathematician, evidence led to ban on sex-segregated classified advertising. leukemia.
- Erling Kristiansen, 85, Norwegian Olympic cyclist.
- Ken Major, 80, British architect.
- Stanley Middleton, 89, British author, cancer.
- Harry Patch, 111, British supercentenarian, fourth-last surviving World War I veteran.
- Lorrie Pickering, 90, New Zealand politician.
- Sarath Ranawaka, 58, Sri Lankan politician, after short illness.

=== 26 ===
- John Brockway, 80, British swimmer.
- Traugott Buhre, 80, German actor.
- Bhaskar Chandavarkar, 73, Indian sitarist and composer, cancer.
- Merce Cunningham, 90, American choreographer, natural causes.
- Richard Ferguson, 73, British barrister, Queen's Counsel for Northern Ireland and former politician.
- Clayton Hill, 78, American actor (Dawn of the Dead, Hellraiser III: Hell on Earth), complications from pneumonia.
- Lois Hunt, 84, American lyric soprano, complications from cardiac surgery.
- Marcey Jacobson, 97, American photographer of indigenous peoples in Mexico, heart failure.
- Jim King, 69, American politician, Florida state senator since 1999, pancreatic cancer.
- Maria Sílvia, 65, Brazilian actress, lung cancer.
- Michael Steinberg, 80, American musicologist.
- Sérgio Viotti, 82, Brazilian actor, cardiac arrest.
- Jerry Yanover, 62, Canadian political advisor.

=== 27 ===
- Bernadette Cozart, 60, American gardener, urban gardening advocate, heart attack.
- Dick Holub, 87, American basketball player (NY Knicks) and coach (FDU).
- Lars Käll, 75, Swedish Olympic sailor.
- Domingos Lam, 81, Chinese Roman Catholic bishop of Macau.
- Joseph C. Muren, 73, American Mormon general authority.
- Lee Orr, 92, Canadian Olympic athlete.
- Luis Quintana, 57, Puerto Rican baseball player (California Angels), natural causes.
- George Russell, 86, American jazz composer, complications from Alzheimer's disease.
- Larry Siemering, 98, American college football head coach, complications from a fall.
- Sybil, 3, British Downing Street cat, Chief Mouser to the Cabinet Office (2007–2008), after short illness.
- Aeronwy Thomas, 66, British translator and writer, daughter of Dylan Thomas, cancer.
- Michaël Zeeman, 50, Dutch literary critic, journalist, poet and writer, brain cancer.

=== 28 ===
- Stelios Georgousopoulos, 43, Greek Olympian windsurfer, illness.
- Bob Hahn, 83, American basketball player.
- Hermann J. Huber, 54, German journalist and writer, heart attack.
- Reverend Ike, 74, American evangelist, stroke.
- Jim Johnson, 68, American football coach (Philadelphia Eagles), melanoma.
- Kaori Kawamura, 38, Japanese singer, breast cancer.
- Brian Mears, 78, British Chairman of Chelsea Football Club (1969–1991).
- Leela Naidu, 69, Indian actress, Miss India (1954), after long illness.
- Tony Rosenthal, 94, American sculptor, stroke.
- William G. Tapply, 69, American writer, leukemia,
- Peter Tahourdin, 80, British-born Australian composer.
- Yukio Yamaji, 25, Japanese serial killer, execution by hanging.

=== 29 ===
- Remi Abiola, 57, Nigerian actress, cancer.
- Dina Babbitt, 86, Czech-born American artist and Holocaust survivor, abdominal cancer.
- Rajan P. Dev, 58, Indian actor, after short illness.
- Gayatri Devi, 90, Indian royal, last Maharani of Jaipur (1939–1970), paralytic ileus.
- Steve Fiorilla, 48, American artist.
- Joanne Jordan, 88, American actress and spokesmodel, Parkinson's disease.
- Ernest W. Lefever, 89, American foreign policy expert, founder of Ethics and Public Policy Center, dementia with Lewy bodies.
- Paul McGrillen, 37, Scottish footballer (Motherwell F.C.).
- Olga A. Méndez, 84, American politician, New York State Senator (1978–2004), breast cancer.
- Steven Miessner, 48, American Academy Awards administrator, heart attack.
- Hideaki Motoyama, 40, Japanese Olympic badminton player.
- Renato Pagliari, 69, Italian-born British singer (Renée and Renato), brain cancer.
- Edward Richardson, 79, Australian cricketer.
- Zhuo Lin, 93, Chinese consultant, widow of Deng Xiaoping.

=== 30 ===
- Zahirul Islam Abbasi, 66, Pakistani general.
- Kola Abdulai, 62, Nigerian Olympic sprinter.
- Renato Izzo, 80, Italian actor, voice actor and screenwriter.
- Yuri Kurnenin, 55, Belarusian football player and coach.
- Joy Langan, 66, Canadian politician, MP for Mission—Coquitlam (1988–1993), breast cancer.
- Yoshihisa Maitani, 76, Japanese camera designer.
- Mohammed Yusuf, 39, Nigerian sect leader, shot.
- Peter Zadek, 83, German stage director, film director and screenwriter, illness.

=== 31 ===
- Sir Edward Archdale, 87, British Royal Navy officer.
- John Donnelly, 72, Scottish footballer (Celtic, Preston North End).
- Tim Guest, 34, British writer, suspected heart attack.
- David Hawkes, 86, British sinologist.
- Chris Humphries, 62, British botanist.
- Ted Nierenberg, 86, American entrepreneur, founder of Dansk International Designs, pancreatic cancer.
- Sir Bobby Robson, 76, British footballer and manager, lung cancer.
- Jean-Paul Roussillon, 78, French actor.
- Harry Alan Towers, 88, British film producer and screenwriter, after short illness.
