= Eisberg =

Eisberg may refer to:

- Eisberg (Lusatian Highlands), a mountain of Saxony, Germany
- Eisberg (Moosbach), a mountain of Bavaria, Germany
- Eisberg (Reiter Alpe), a mountain of Bavaria, Germany
- Eisberg (Stölzinger Hills), a hill in Hesse, Germany
- "Eisberg" (song), by Andreas Bourani
- Eisberg, a brand of de-alcoholised wine produced by Halewood International

== See also ==
- Iceberg, a large piece of freshwater ice floating freely in open water
