= Ray Shaw =

Ray Shaw may refer to:

- Ray Shaw (English footballer) (1913–1980), English footballer and football manager
- Ray Shaw (Australian footballer) (born 1954), Australian rules footballer and coach
- Ray Shaw (journalist) (?–2009), chairman of American City Business Journals
- Ray Shaw (politician) (born c. 1946), member of the Montana House of Representatives
