= Cozart =

Cozart is a surname. According to Dictionary of American Family Names, "it probably a variant spelling of Dutch Cossaert, a nickname for a confidante, sweetheart, or flatterer, from an agent derivative of Middle Dutch cosen ‘to whisper’. Perhaps a variant of French Cossard, which is either a nickname for a lazy person or a derivative of cosse ‘pod’ (see Cosse)." It may refer to:

- Bernadette Cozart (1949–2009), American gardener, botanist, and urban gardening advocate
- Bruce Cozart (born 1955), American politician
- Charlie Cozart (1919–2004), American baseball player
- Craig Cozart (born 1974), American college baseball coach
- Cylk Cozart (born 1957), American actor
- Keith Cozart (born 1995), a.k.a. Chief Keef, American Rapper
- Sam Cozart (born 2006), American baseball player
- Zack Cozart (born 1985), American baseball player
