= Muren =

Muren may refer to

- a number of rivers in Mongolia, Inner Mongolia, and Manchuria (cf. Mongolian: Мөрөн, Mörön - "river"), for example
  - the Muling River, a left tributary of the Ussuri,
  - Shar Mörön (Chinese: 西拉木伦河), one of the headwaters of the Xiliao He, which in turn is one of the headwaters of the Liao River,
  - Delgermörön, one of the headwaters of the Selenge,
- Mörön (city), a town on the Delgermörön,
  - Mörön Airport.
- Muren, Indiana, an unincorporated community in the United States

People:

- Zeki Müren, a Turkish singer, composer and actor,
- Dennis Muren, an American film special effects artist,
- Joseph C. Muren, a general authority of the Church of Jesus Christ of Latter-day Saints
