= Miessner =

Miessner is a surname. Notable people with the surname include:

- Benjamin Miessner (1890–1976), American radio engineer and inventor
- Steven Miessner (1960–2009), administrator of the Academy Awards for the Academy of Motion Picture Arts and Sciences
- W. Otto Miessner (1880–1967), American composer and music educator
