= Velma Scantlebury =

Barbadian-born American transplant surgeon

Dr. Velma Scantlebury
- Born: Velma Patricia Scantlebury; 6 October 1955 (age 71); Goodland, St. Michael Parish, Barbados
- Other name: Velma Scantlebury-White
- Occupation: transplant surgeon
- Years active: 1988–present
- Known for: First Black woman transplant surgeon in the United States
- Spouse: Dr. Harvey White (m. 1989)

Dr. Velma Scantlebury GCM also Velma Scantlebury-White (born 6 October 1955) is a Barbadian-born American transplant surgeon. She was the first Black woman transplant surgeon in the United States. She has received many honors in her career, having been named to both the "Best Doctors in America" and "Top Doctors in America" lists multiple times.

Scantlebury has been awarded the Woman of Spirit Award for inspiring others and the "Gift of Life Award" from the National Kidney Foundation. In addition to recognition by the Caribbean American Medical and Scientific Association, she received the Order of Barbados Gold Crown of Merit, for her efforts to educate minorities about organ transplant. She has performed over 2,000 transplants and published many peer-reviewed papers.

== Early life and education ==
Velma Patricia Scantlebury was born on 6 October 1955 in Goodland, St. Michael Parish, Barbados, to Kathleen (née Jordan) and Delacey Whitstanley Scantlebury. She attended three years at Alleyne School in St. Andrew Parish, before her family moved to New York City in 1969. After completing her secondary education at Prospect Heights High School in Brooklyn, Scantlebury began studying biology in 1973 at Long Island University Brooklyn. Though offered a one-year scholarship to Barnard College, she was concerned about the financial burden of continuing her studies and instead opted to attend school in Brooklyn, where she thrived.

== Medical school and surgical residency ==
Graduating in 1977 with her BS in biology, she was accepted at both Yale School of Medicine and Columbia University College of Physicians and Surgeons (P&S). She chose to attend P&S, earning her medical degree in 1981.

Despite discouragement from the surgical faculty, Scantlebury completed her general surgery internship and residency at Harlem Hospital Center, finding a mentor in Dr. Barbara Barlow, head of the pediatric surgical department. While in her third year of residency, she began interviewing to select her specialty. After meeting with Dr. Mark M. Ravitch, one of the pioneers in the use of medical stapling in the US, at the University of Pittsburgh Children's Hospital, she was convinced to study pediatric transplantation. In 1986, Scantlebury began her fellowship at the University of Pittsburgh (Pitt) School of Medicine, under the direction of Dr. Thomas Starzl and spent the next two years in clinical work.

== First African-American woman transplant surgeon ==
Between 1988 and 2002, Scantlebury worked as a transplant surgeon at the Pitt School of Medicine, earning her Doctor of Surgery in 1989, as the first African-American woman transplant surgeon. That same year, she married Dr. Harvey White, received the "Gift of Life Award" from the National Kidney Foundation and began teaching as an assistant professor at Pitt. In 1996, she was awarded the Carlow University Woman of Spirit, award for her inspiration to other women. Scantlebury worked her way up to associate professor by 2002 and was recruited by the University of South Alabama (USA) as a surgical professor and as director of the USA's Gulf Coast Regional Transplant Centre.

== Physician honors and recognition ==
In 2003, she was honored as one of the "Best Doctors in America" and inducted into the Achievers Hall of Fame of the United Negro College Fund. In 2004 and 2006, she was listed as one of the "Top Doctors in America", and then in 2006 she began working with other transplant surgeons, the Coalition on Donation, and the National Minority Organ and Tissue Transplant Education Program in an endeavor called Linkages to Life to educate the black community and dispel myths regarding transplants. She was rewarded for her work by the Caribbean American Medical and Scientific Association and received the Order of Barbados Gold Crown of Merit.

== Kidney transplant program director ==
Scantlebury accepted an offer from the Christiana Care Health System of Delaware in 2008 to serve as director of their kidney transplant program and the family relocated. In her career, Scantlebury estimates she has completed over 2,000 transplants, and has published more than 85 peer-reviewed research papers, as well as 10 monographs and several book chapters.
