= Hermann J. Huber =

German journalist and writer

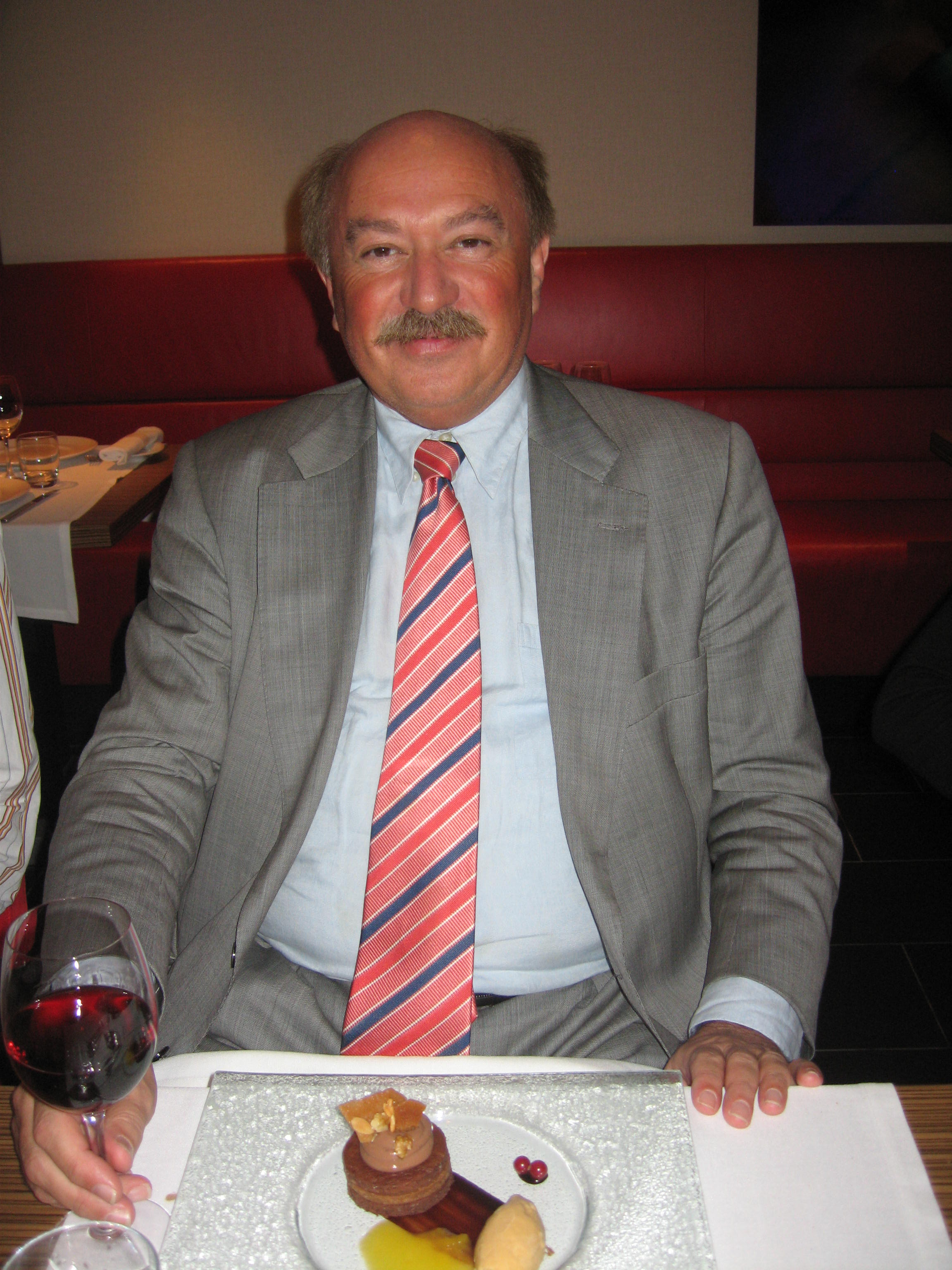
- Hermann J. Huber
- Born: 31 October 1954; Moosbach, Bavaria, West Germany
- Died: 28 July 2009 (aged 54); Moosbach, Bavaria, Germany
- Occupations: Journalist and writer

Hermann J. Huber (1954 – 28 July 2009) was a German journalist, writer, and politician. He was born and died in Moosbach, Bavaria.

== Life ==
After school in Weiden in der Oberpfalz, Bavaria, at Augustinus-Gymnasium Weiden, Huber studied Roman Catholic theology and history at LMU Munich. After university studies, Huber worked as a journalist. From 1977 to 1981, Huber was president of the Medien und Jugend in Deutschland organisation. Huber was editor-in-chief of the magazines die alternative and Der Blickpunkt. During the 1980s and 1990s, Huber wrote 14 books. In 1989, his book Leben, Lieben, Legenden became a national interest in Germany. In this book, Huber wrote about popular gay people such as singer Rex Gildo.

Huber, who lived openly gay, died of a myocardial infarction on 28 July 2009 in Moosbach.

== Works by Huber ==
- Leben, Lieben, Legenden (1989)
- Leben, Laster, Leidenschaft, Weitere 60 schillernde Kultstars der Schwulen (Foerster Verlag, Frankfurt/Main)
- Gay Video Guide – Part 1 (Foerster Media, Offenbach)
- Gay Video Guide – Part 2 (Foerster Media, Offenbach)
- Das schwule Dschungelbuch (Foerster Media, Offenbach)
- Schauspieler Lexikon der Gegenwart – Germany Austria Switzerland (Langen Müller Verlag, Munich)
- Gewalt und Leidenschaft – Filmlexikon (Bruno Gmünder Verlag, Berlin)
- Gott spielt mit – Film- und Fernsehstars über ihren Glauben (Herder Verlag, Freiburg)
