= Pierre-Antoine-Jean Bach =

French priest (1932–2020)

Pierre-Antoine-Jean Bach M.E.P.
- Vicar Apostolic of Savannakhet
- Church: Catholic Church
- See: Apostolic Vicariate of Savannakhet
- In office: 28 June 1971 – 10 July 1975
- Predecessor: Jean-Rosière-Eugène Arnaud
- Successor: Jean-Baptiste Outhay Thepmany
- Other post: Titular Bishop of Tituli in Proconsulari (1971-2020)

Orders
- Ordination: 27 December 1959
- Consecration: 10 October 1971 by Jean-Rosière-Eugène Arnaud

Personal details
- Born: 29 July 1932 Commercy, Meuse, France
- Died: 26 June 2020 (aged 87) Bangkok, Thailand

Pierre-Antoine-Jean Bach (29 July 1932 – 26 June 2020) was a French-born Laotian Roman Catholic bishop.

Bach was born in France and was ordained to the priesthood in 1959. He served as the Roman Catholic bishop of the Apostolic Vicariate of Savannakhet. Laos, from 1971 to 1975.
