= Jean-Baptiste Outhay Thepmany =

Laotian Catholic bishop (1935–1998)

His Excellency Jean-Baptiste Outhay Thepmany
- Vicar Apostolic of Savannakhet
- Installed: 10 July 1975
- Term ended: 21 April 1997
- Predecessor: Pierre-Antoine-Jean Bach
- Successor: Jean Sommeng Vorachak

Orders
- Ordination: 29 June 1963
- Consecration: 24 August 1975 by Thomas Khamphan

Personal details
- Born: 1935 Thakhek
- Died: 19 March 1998 (aged 62–63)

Jean-Baptiste Outhay Thepmany (1935 – 19 March 1998) was a Laotian Roman Catholic prelate. He was titular bishop of Sfasferia from 1975 until his death and vicar apostolic of Savannakhet from 1975 to 1997 and President of Episcopal Conference of Laos and Cambodia from 1987 until 1995. He died on 19 March 1998 at the age of 63.

Catholic Church titles
Preceded by Pierre-Antoine-Jean Bach	Vicar Apostolic of Savannakhet; 1975–1997	Succeeded by Jean Sommeng Vorachak
Preceded by Antonio Silvio Zocchetta	Titular Bishop of Sfasferia; 1975–1998	Succeeded by Michael Gorō Matsuura
