= Boys and Girls High School =

Public school in New York City

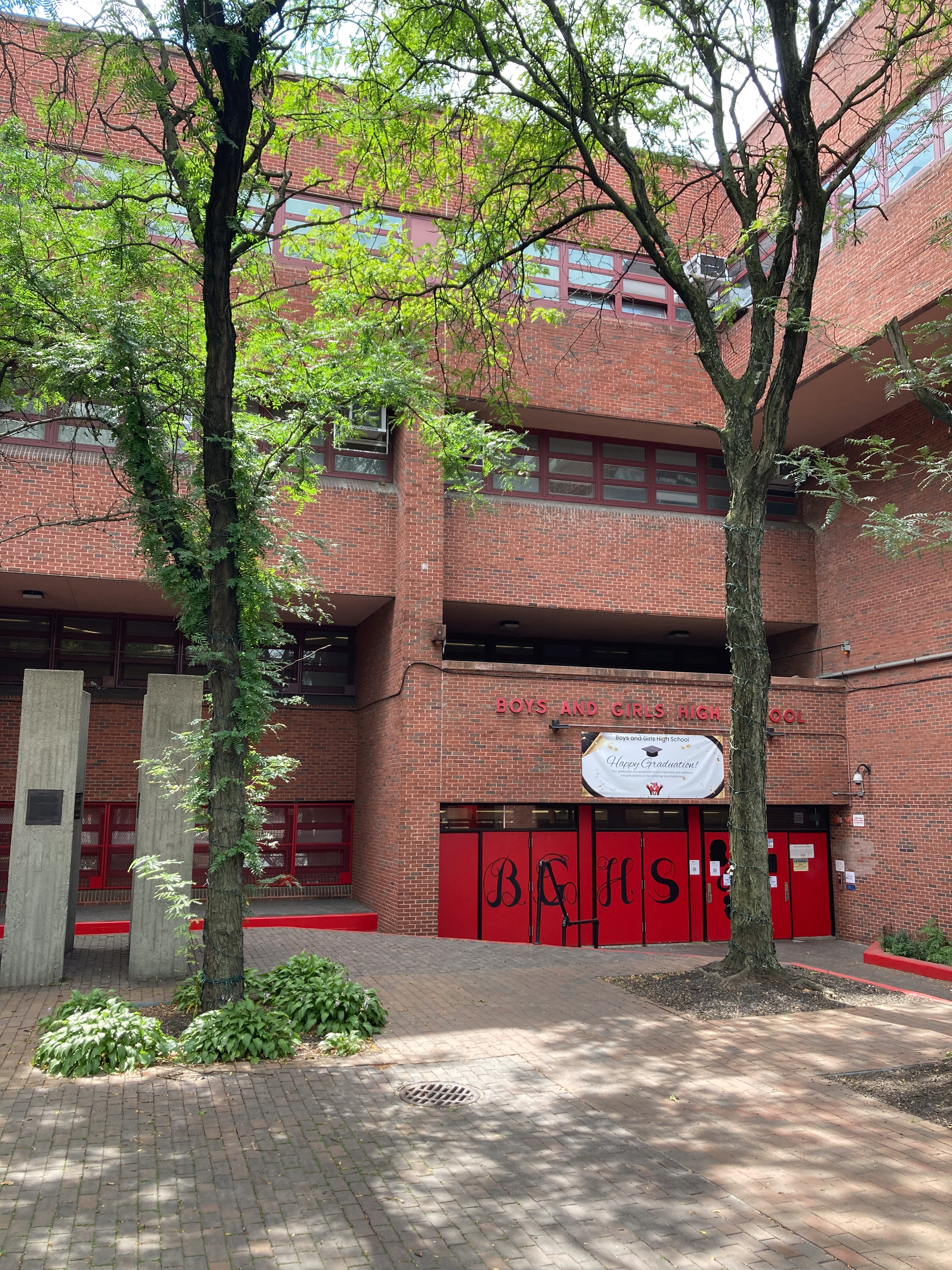

Location
- 1700 Fulton Street; Brooklyn, New York; United States
- Coordinates: 40°40′44.4″N 73°55′53.4″W

Information
- Type: Public high school
- Established: 1975
- School board: New York City Public Schools
- School number: K455
- Principal: Grecian Harrison
- Faculty: 43.0 FTEs
- Grades: 9–12
- Enrollment: 452 (as of 2023–24)
- Student to teacher ratio: 15.0:1
- Colors: Red, white, and black
- Mascot: Kangaroo
- Website: boysandgirlshs.org

Boys and Girls High School, the oldest public high school in Brooklyn, is a comprehensive high school in Bedford–Stuyvesant, Brooklyn, New York, United States. The school is located at 1700 Fulton Street.

As of the 2014–15 school year, the school had an enrollment of 643 students and 43.0 classroom teachers (on an FTE basis), for a student–teacher ratio of 15.0:1. There were 463 students (72.0% of enrollment) eligible for free lunch and 15 (2.3% of students) eligible for reduced-cost lunch.

== History ==
Brooklyn's first public high school, the Central Grammar School (named "Central" rather than "Free" to avoid controversy over providing free secondary education for poor children), opened September 1878 in a rented building on Court & Livingston Streets. A new building was planned on the east side of Nostrand Avenue between from Halsey and Macon Streets, designed by Superintendent of Buildings James W. Naughton, but by the time it opened in 1886, enrollment had increased to the point where it was decided to use this building as the girls' high school and to build a separate building for the boys. The boys remained in the Court Street space. As there were now effectively two schools, in 1891 they were renamed as the Girls' High School and the Boys' High School. A new building for the boys was begun in 1891, on Marcy Avenue, between Madison Street & Putnam Avenue. It opened as Boys High School on November 1, 1892. In 1975 the two schools were merged once again, and shortly afterward moved into their present building at Fulton Street and Utica Avenue.

From 1986 until 2004, the school's principal was Frank Mickens, who dealt with the school's many problems during the 1980s. Though Mickens' methods were later attacked on the grounds that he was steering undesirable students to other institutions, by 1989 some 70 percent of the high school's graduates were enrolled in colleges.

== Noted alumni ==
- Isaac Asimov, science-fiction author
- Albert Blaustein (1921–1994), civil rights and human rights lawyer and constitutional consultant who helped draft the Fijian and Liberian constitutions.
- Emanuel Celler, Congressman
- Shirley Chisholm, Congresswoman, presidential candidate
- Ray Copeland, jazz trumpeter
- Aaron Copland, composer
- Tommy Davis, baseball and basketball player
- Fabolous, Rapper
- Connie Hawkins, basketball player
- Lena Horne, singer, actress
- Bryce Jones, basketball player
- Duke Jordan, jazz pianist
- Norman Mailer, author
- Sean Michaels, adult film actor and director
- Cecil Payne, jazz saxophonist
- Man Ray, avant-garde artist, photographer
- Lawrence Tierney, actor
- Dwayne "Pearl" Washington, basketball player
- Randy Weston, jazz pianist
- Lenny Wilkens, basketball player
- Dom Zanni, baseball player
