= Albert Blaustein =

American lawyer (1921–1994)

- Born: October 12, 1921; Brooklyn, New York, U.S.
- Died: August 21, 1994 (aged 72); Durham, North Carolina, U.S.
- Education: University of Michigan
- Occupations: Lawyer, legal advisor

Albert Paul Blaustein (October 12, 1921 – August 21, 1994) was an American civil rights and human rights lawyer and constitutional consultant who helped draft the Fijian and Liberian constitutions, as well as being called in as a consultant for the constitutions of Zimbabwe, Bangladesh, Cambodia and Peru. To a lesser extent, he was involved in the constitutions of Poland, South Africa, Hungary, Romania, Niger, Uganda and Trinidad and Tobago. He was the editor of the 20-volume encyclopaedia Constitutions of the Countries of the World.

== Biography ==
Blaustein was born in Brooklyn, New York City on October 12, 1921, to lawyer Allen Blaustein and Rose Brickman, and often operated under the pseudonym Allen DeGraeff. He graduated at the age of 16 from Boys High School (now Boys and Girls High School) and then attended the University of Michigan, where he worked on The Michigan Daily newspaper, graduating in 1941, at the age of 19. During World War II, he served in the United States Army, where he earned the rank of major. He graduated from Columbia Law School in 1948, and in the same year he was admitted to the New York State Bar. From 1948 to 1955, he was assistant professor of law at New York Law School, as well as, a consultant for the National Trial Lawyers Association before moving to Rutgers University until 1959, when he became law librarian.

From 1959 until 1968, Blaustein worked in the London School of Economics, the Constitution Associates foreign advisory board and the US Department of Education and the US Commission on Civil Rights from 1962 - 1963. Between 1971 and 1972, he acted as a legal consultant to various African nations and to the United States Senate. He worked with the Civil Rights Reviewing Authority, National Committee for American Foreign Policy, New Jersey Division on Civil Rights and also helped found Law day. Blaustein later worked to develop the Russian court system and constitution, and in 1966, served as the expert witness on legal aspects of population control for the US Senate.

Blaustein served 14 years in the US Army Reserves retiring with the rank of major, and served from 1942 until 1946 in the Judge Advocate General's Corps.

A resident of Cherry Hill, New Jersey, Blaustein died on August 21, 1994, at the age of 72 at Duke University Hospital after he experienced a heart attack.

== Written work ==
- Framing the Modern Constitution: A Checklist 1994
- Human Rights in the World's Constitutions 1993
- Discrimination Against Women: A Global Survey of the Economic, Educational, Social and Political Status of Women 1990
- Constitutions That Made History 1988
- Resolving Language Conflicts: A Study of the World's Constitution 1986
- Independence Documents of the World 1977
- The Arab Oil Weapon 1977
- Civil Rights and the Black American: A Documentary History 1976
- Desegregation and the law: The meaning and effect of the school segregation cases 1957
- The American lawyer: A summary of the "Survey of the legal profession 1954
