= Adésio =

Brazilian footballer (1933–2009)

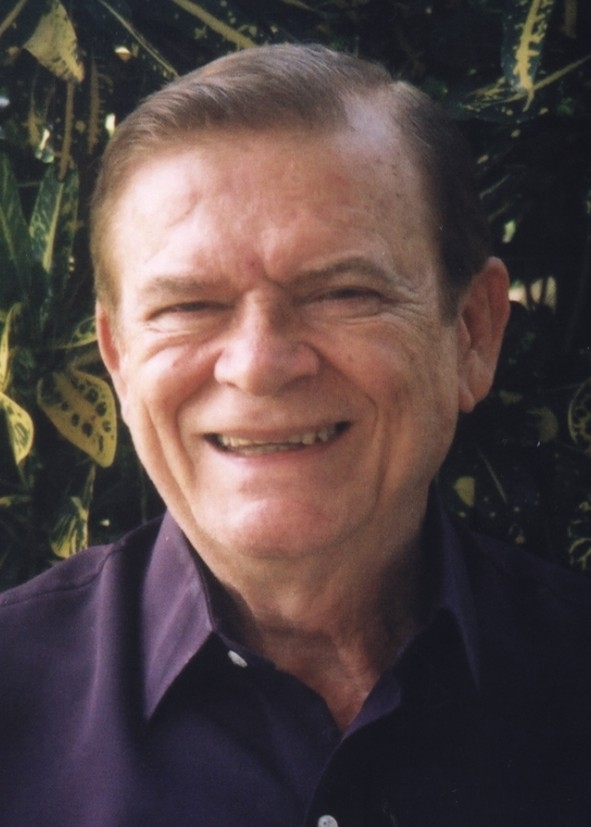
- Adésio in 2004

Personal information
- Full name: Adésio Alves Machado
- Date of birth: 12 January 1933
- Place of birth: Recife, Brazil
- Date of death: 2 July 2009 (aged 76)
- Position: Midfielder

Senior career*
Years	Team	Apps	(Gls)
1947–1950	Sport Recife		
1951–1956	Vasco da Gama		
1957–1958	Bangu		
1959	Canto do Rio		
1960	Noroeste		
1961	Deportivo Español		
1963	América Mineiro		

International career
1952	Brazil Olympic	3	(0)
- * Club domestic league appearances and goals

Adésio Alves Machado (12 January 1933 – 2 July 2009), known as just Adésio, was a Brazilian footballer who played as a midfielder. He competed in the 1952 Summer Olympics.

== Honours ==
Vasco da Gama

- Campeonato Carioca: 1956
