= Joe DiGangi =

American baseball player (1914–2009)

- Bullpen catcher
- Born: December 1, 1914; Greenpoint, Brooklyn, U.S.
- Died: July 14, 2009 (aged 94); Coronado, California, U.S.

Teams
- New York Yankees (1933–1941)

Joe DiGangi (December 1, 1914 – July 14, 2009) served as the New York Yankees bullpen catcher during the team's golden age – 1933 through 1941. He was born in the Greenpoint section of Brooklyn. He was also a Navy Seabee in the Pacific during World War II. On July 4, 1939, DiGangi was warming up the Yankees starting pitcher in the bullpen when Lou Gehrig made his famous "Luckiest man on the face of the Earth" farewell speech.
