= Austin Gresham =

British pathologist (1924–2009)

Geoffrey Austin Gresham (1 November 1924 – 24 July 2009) was a British pathologist and writer of A Colour Atlas of Forensic Pathology, a seminal book on the subject.

He was educated at Gonville and Caius College, Cambridge and King's College London where he was awarded the Jelf Medal.

Austin Gresham was emeritus professor of morbid anatomy and histopathology at Jesus College, Cambridge.

His 1975 handbook, A Colour Atlas of Forensic Pathology, was compiled for trainee pathologists and, according to the author, "designed to fit into a jacket pocket so that it could be taken into the field".
