= Moosbach, Bavaria =

Moosbach
- Municipality
- Coat of arms

- Location of Moosbach within Neustadt an der Waldnaab district
- Interactive map of Moosbach
- Location within Germany Location within Bavaria
- Coordinates: 49°36′N 12°25′E
- Country: Germany
- State: Bavaria
- Admin. region: Oberpfalz
- District: Neustadt an der Waldnaab

Government
  - Mayor (2020–26): Armin Bulenda (CSU)

Area
  - Total: 64.31 km^{2} (24.83 sq mi)
- Elevation: 498–771 m (1,634–2,530 ft)

Population (2025-12-31)
  - Total: 2,458
  - Density: 38.22/km^{2} (98.99/sq mi)
- Time zone: UTC+01:00 (CET)
  - Summer (DST): UTC+02:00 (CEST)
- Postal codes: 92709
- Dialling codes: 09656
- Vehicle registration: NEW
- Website: www.moosbach.de

Moosbach (/ˈmoʊsbɑːx/ MOHS-bahkh; German: Moosbach [ˈmoːsbax]; Bavarian: Moosboch [ˈmoːsbɔx]) is a municipality in the district of Neustadt an der Waldnaab in the Free State of Bavaria, Germany. Covering an area of 63.74 square kilometers, it has a population of approximately 1,050 inhabitants as of the 2011 census. Located within the Upper Palatine Forest near the Czech border, Moosbach is known for its natural landscapes and historical significance, including former iron ore mining on Eisenberg mountain and a Cold War-era Bundeswehr radar station. The municipality is part of the larger Upper Palatinate region and is governed by Mayor Armin Bulenda (CSU) for the 2020–2026 term.

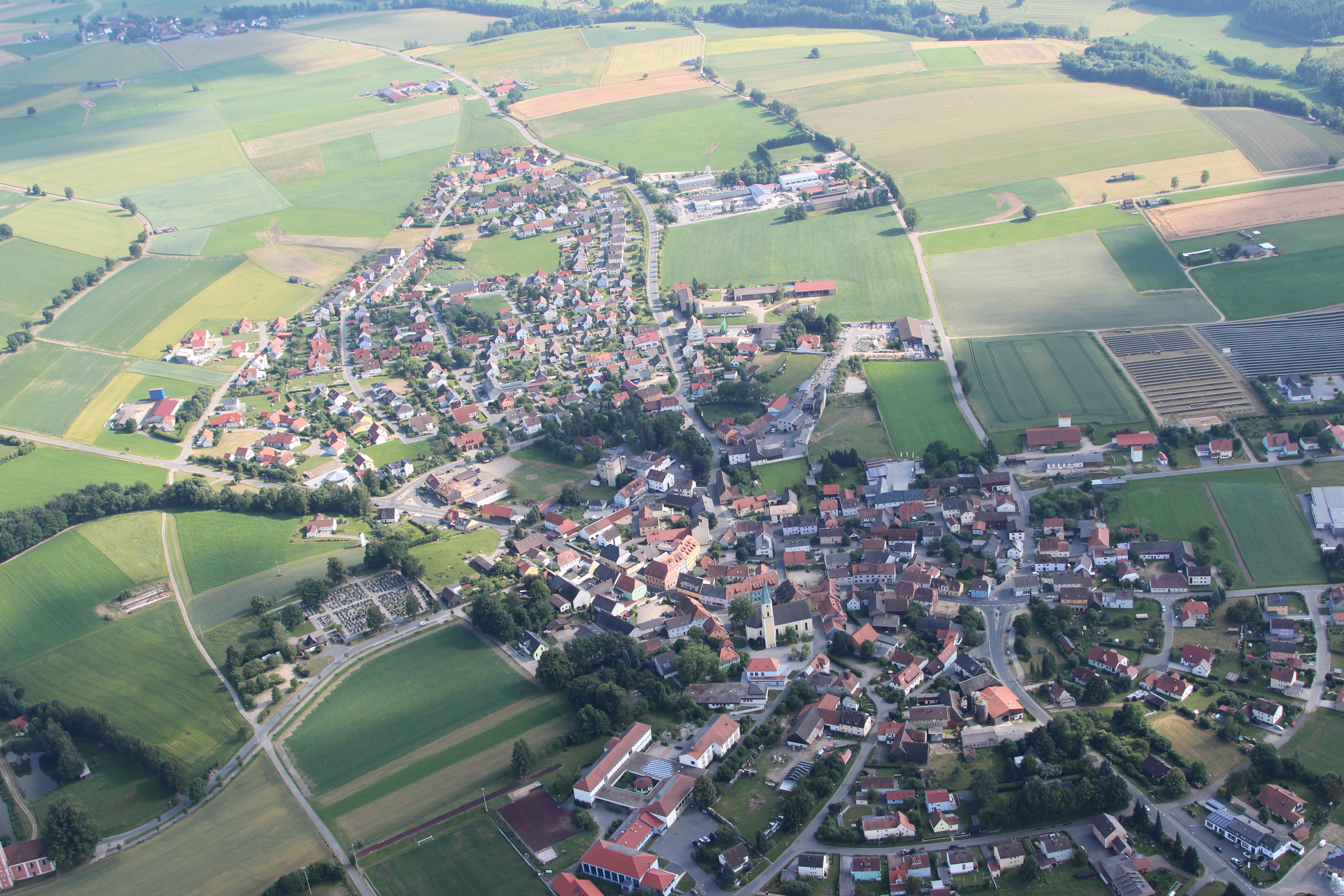
Moosbach

== Geography ==
- Eisberg mountain, 771 m (2,530 ft)
