= Bernadette Cozart =

American gardener and botanist

Bernadette Cozart (May 17, 1949 – July 27, 2009) was an American professional gardener, botanist, and urban gardening advocate. She worked for a time with the New York City Department of Parks and Recreation.

== Biography ==
In 1989, Cozart founded the Greening of Harlem Coalition to help residents regenerate and take responsibility for their own neighborhoods, transform rundown vacant lots in Harlem and other neighborhoods in New York City into flower gardens and to restore existing green spaces. Cozart formed alliances with many neighborhood organizations to help make these community gardens a reality. One major partner in the movement towards green spaces and the renewal of playgrounds in Harlem was Barbara Barlow, a surgeon at Harlem Hospital who worked with Cozart to create positive green spaces in the community. Much of Cozart's focus was on the establishment of gardens at New York City schools. The gardens were constructed at several public schools. Among the examples of gardens designed by Cozart and the Greening of Harlem Coalition was a playground with garden boxes at P.S. 197 and a Japanese style garden with a pagoda at P.S. 134.

Cozart explained her advocacy for school gardens in a 1993 New York Times piece on The Greening of Harlem Coalition, "Instead of taking children on field trips to see farms and gardens, why not bring nature into the community? I don't think it's fair that they should have to go outside the community to have that experience of seeing things grow." Cozart felt that her work was about transformation, and she discussed that community green spaces cause a "domino effect" in communities. Community green spaces increase the pride that residents have in their community, and residents begin to work to beautify their communities in other ways. Cozart stated, "If you can take a garbage-strewn lot, or anything else in your neighborhood that you don't like, and turn it into a thing of beauty that benefits the com-munity--a thing of usefulness--then you know you can transform other things. You can transform things you don't like in your own life and in yourself--and that's power."

Cozart moved from Harlem to Allentown, Pennsylvania, in 2002, where she became president of the Allentown Garden Club. Under her guidance, the club launched the Allentown Beautification Program in 2006, which aimed to beautify street intersections in Allentown using native plants and flowers. The program was based on the Greening of Harlem Coalition, which Cozart had founded in 1989. Cozart and the Allentown Garden Club, with the support of Allentown mayor Ed Pawlowski, relied on donations from local businesses and community organizations to cover the funding of the Allentown Beautification Program.

== Death ==
Cozart suffered a heart attack while taking a water aerobics class at Cedar Beach in Allentown, Pennsylvania. She was rushed to St. Luke's Hospital-Allentown, but died en route. She was 60 years old. She was pronounced dead at the hospital on July 27, 2009, at 11:27 a.m. Allentown Mayor Pawlowski spoke of Cozart, noting that her death was a loss for the city and larger community, "She helped in greening Allentown and making it a better place to live ... [S]he is going to be sorely missed. I, for one, am going to miss her. We are a little bit less in the city today because of her loss." Cozart was survived by her partner, Kathleen Kapila.
