= Eisberg (Stölzinger Hills) =

Coordinates: 51°08′47″N 9°46′31″E

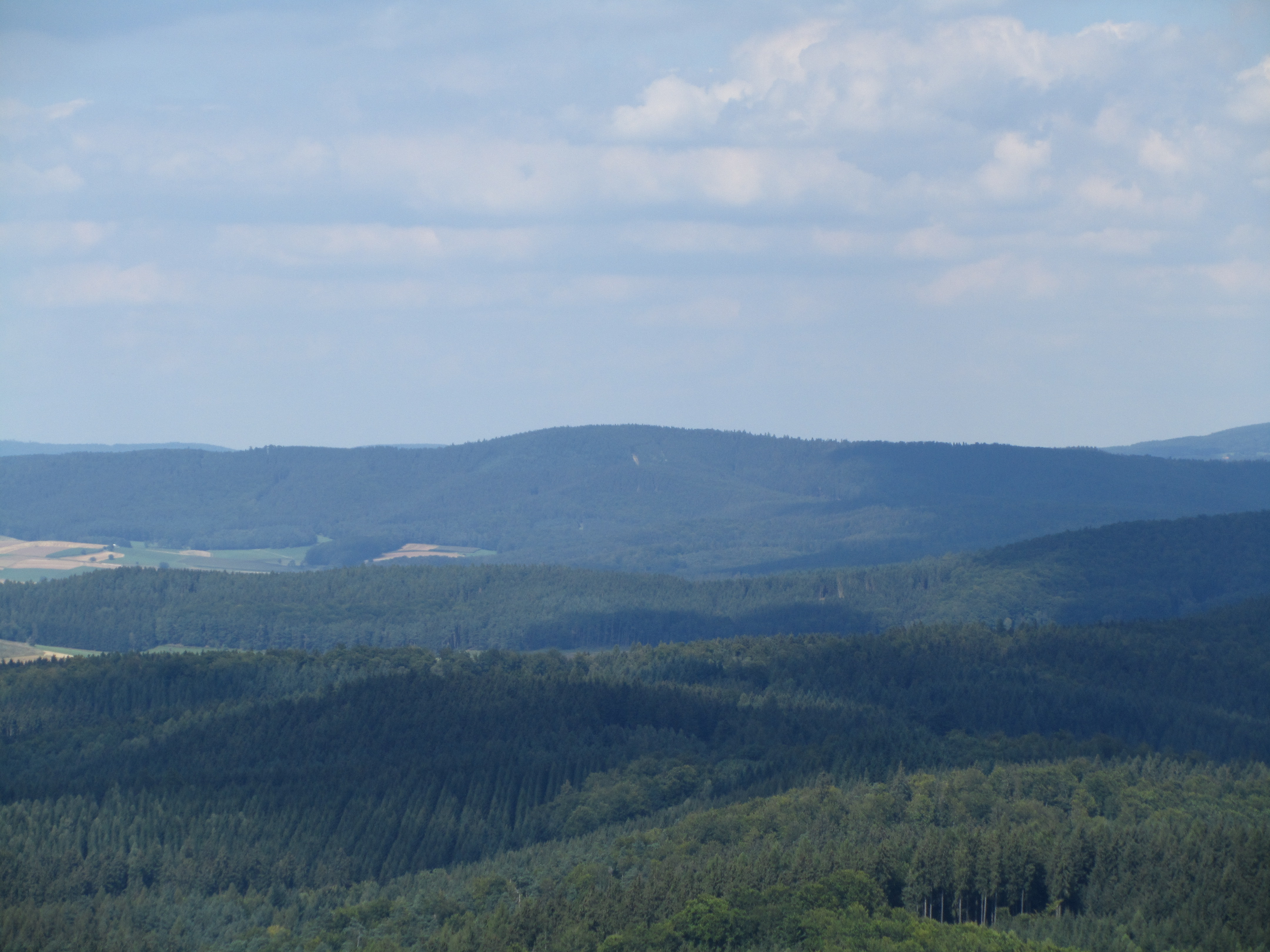
- View of Eisberg as seen from the Alheimerturm

Highest point
- Elevation: 583 m (1,913 ft)

Geography
- Location: Hesse, Germany

The Eisberg is a hill in Hesse, Germany.
