= Jean Sommeng Vorachak =

- Apostolic Vicar of Savannakhet
- Church: Catholic Church
- See: Apostolic Vicariate of Savannakhet
- In office: 21 April 1997 – 14 July 2009
- Predecessor: Jean-Baptiste Outhay Thepmany
- Successor: Jean Marie Prida Inthirath
- Other post: Titular Bishop of Muzuca in Proconsulari (1997-2009)

Orders
- Ordination: 29 June 1963
- Consecration: 19 October 1997 by Thomas Khamphan

Personal details
- Born: 24 February 1933
- Died: 14 July 2009 (aged 76)

Jean Sommeng Vorachek (February 24, 1933 – July 14, 2009) was the Roman Catholic bishop of the Vicariate Apostolic of Savannakhet, Laos.

Ordained a Roman Catholic priest on June 29, 1963, Pope John Paul II appointed Vorachek bishop of the Vicariate Apostolic of Savannakhet. He was ordained bishop on October 19, 1997.
