= Colin Hillman =

Welsh rugby coach

- Born: 1963 Bridgend, Wales
- Died: 2 July 2009 (age 46) Bridgend, Wales
- School: Brynteg Comprehensive School

Rugby union career
- Position: Hooker
Amateur team(s)
Years	Team	Apps	(Points)
- Bridgend RFC
–	Swansea RFC		
–	South Wales Police RFC		
–	Merthyr rugby clubs		
International career
Years	Team	Apps	(Points)
- Barbarians
National sevens team
Years	Team		Comps
–	Wales 7s		
Coaching career
- Years: Team
- Bridgend RFC
- –: Wales 7s

Colin Hillman (1963 – 2 July 2009) was a Welsh rugby player and coach, known for his time with the Wales sevens team.

== Rugby career ==
=== Playing career ===
During his senior playing career, Hillman was a hooker for Bridgend RFC but also played for the Barbarians, Wales Sevens, Swansea RFC, South Wales Police RFC, Bridgend Sports and Merthyr rugby clubs.

On 31 May 1980, Hillman played with the Wales Youth team who defeated South Africa Youth in the match before the British & Irish Lions played the Springboks. The game was the first Welsh international win against a South African international team on South African soil until the senior team's tour of the country in 2022. While he never played for the Wales senior XV, he did play for Wales 7s.

=== Coaching career ===
After his playing days, Hillman turned to coaching, first at Nantymoel RFC and later at the Bridgend Ravens. He also was the coach for the Wales national rugby sevens team.

== Police career ==
Hillman worked for South Wales Police as an Armed Response Officer.

== Personal life ==
Hillman was married with two children. He died on 2 July 2009 after a two-year battle with pancreatic cancer.
