= Aygyl Tajiyeva =

Turkmen activist and politician (1944–2009)

Aygyl Tajiyeva (27 August 1944 – 22 July 2009) was a Turkmen activist and politician.

Born in Mary, in 1990 she became a member of the Supreme Soviet of the Turkmen SSR for a district of Daşoguz Province.

Tajiyeva was a member of the Assembly of Turkmenistan during the early 1990s following the independence of Turkmenistan from the Soviet Union. She became an opposition critic of the President of Turkmenistan Niyazov and his government's increasingly repressive policies.

Tajiyeva and her family were forced to leave Turkmenistan in 2002. She settled as an exile in Sweden.

She became a contributor to Radio Free Europe's Turkmen Service while in exile. She gave her last interview to Radio Free Europe on 21 July 2009, but ended the session early because she did not feel well.

Aygyl Tajiyeva died of a stroke on 22 July 2009 in Sweden at the age of 64. She was buried on 24 July 2009 near Stockholm, Sweden.
