= Frank Mickens =

American educator

Frank Mickens (22 June 1946 – 9 July 2009), was a New York City educator and principal of Boys and Girls High School in Brooklyn.

The seventeenth largest high school in the United States, Boys and Girls High School has a student population of over four thousand students. Boys and Girls High School was built in the 1970s as a model 'education option' school, and Mickens successfully embraced this initiative as an administrator in the New York City Department of Education. His cigar-chomping tough no-nonsense 'take charge' clawhammer approach earned Mickens 'tough love' comparisons to Joe Louis Clark and the controversial nickname 'The Chancellor of Fulton Street'.

== Early life ==
Mickens' mother was a teacher. He was a graduate of Erasmus Hall High School in Brooklyn. He earned a B.A. in History from SUNY Potsdam, and a Master's degree from New York University. In 1968, he began teaching at Boys High School, and served as boys baseball and basketball coach 1969–1979, leading the Kangaroos to the 1979 PSAL boys basketball championship, and also served as academic dean of students. He completed postgraduate work at Columbia University, and later attended the Principal's Center at Harvard University. In 1982, he became principal of a Junior High School 324 in Bedford-Stuyvesant, and later was principal of Martin Luther King High School (New York) in Manhattan. In 1980, he became men's basketball coach at Borough of Manhattan Community College.

== Later achievements ==
In 1986, Mickens became principal of Boys and Girls High School, which had a graduation rate of 24.4 percent. By 2004, the year he retired, the high school graduation rate had risen to 47.7 percent with 85% of graduates headed to college. For eighteen years, Mickens worked twelve-hour days, seven days a week, and frequently patrolled the perimeter of the high school with a clawhammer, and patrolled the hallways with a walkie-talkie, clipboard and a bullhorn. His aim was to create a college preparatory environment of excellence, self-esteem and safety for his students.

In 2001–2002, Mickens was a Charles Revson Fellow at Columbia University. Medgar Evers College awarded him an honorary degree of letters. Mickens also lectured in the Graduate School of Education at Long Island University.

He also served simultaneously as an Assistant Superintendent in the Brooklyn High Schools, helping to set curriculum and policy standards, and plan future academics.

== Controversy and lawsuits ==
Mickens unorthodox administrative style attracted controversy, as well as lawsuits, by instituting codes of conduct, a blouse skirt/shirt and tie dress code that he called dress for success and long suspensions for infractions of the rules.

He had teachers posted outside school every morning to discourage trouble, as well as having various MTA buses waiting after school so students wouldn't have to wait in this rough neighborhood. His disciplinary code included no hats, no listening to a Walkman, no gold teeth caps, no excessive jewellery, and no sneakers with lights. He also had inspirational banners all over the school to remind the students to always do their best.

The lawsuits against Mickens stemmed from his moving troublesome students into programs from which they did not graduate, and were not settled until four years after his retirement.

== Death ==
Mickens, who was divorced and lost his only son in a car accident at a young age, was found dead at age 63 at his home in Bedford-Stuyvesant Brooklyn of natural causes on July 9, 2009. Eulogies at his funeral were given by the Rev. Al Sharpton, City Controller Bill Thompson (New York) and Brooklyn Borough President Marty Markowitz. Mickens was buried wearing his trademark suit and bowtie and holding his trademark cigar.

== Books by Frank Mickens ==
- It Doesn't Have To Be That Way: A Positive Environment in Our Schools by Frank Mickens
- My Way: The Leadership Style of an Urban High School Principal by Frank Mickens
