= Steve Brennan (American reporter) =

Steve Brennan (c. 1952 – July 2, 2009) was an Irish-born American reporter, journalist and editor of The Hollywood Reporter, a major entertainment industry trade publication.

Brennan's career began far from Hollywood and the entertainment industry. His career began as a reporter for Independent Newspapers, now called Independent News & Media, based in Dublin, Ireland. He initially covered a broad range of the news beats, ranging from entertainment to the violence which plagued Northern Ireland at the time. Brennan received a National Press Award for investigative reporting while at the newspaper. He later became involved primarily in entertainment news both in Ireland and abroad. Brennan began working as a consultant with the Irish government and the Irish film industry concerning the global film and television industries. He consulted while continuing to report for Independent Newspapers.

Brennan became working as the Irish correspondent for The Hollywood Reporter while still living in Ireland. He would ultimately spend more than 20 years at The Hollywood Reporter.

He moved to Los Angeles in 1989 to join the newspaper's main headquarters. Brennan was first hired at The Hollywood Reporter as a freelance reporter. He was later promoted as a full reporter and covered international television and U.S. domestic syndication news. Brennan became the international editor of The Hollywood Reporter during his last years with the publication.

In 2007, Brennan published his book, Emeralds in Tinseltown: The Irish in Hollywood, which he co-published with his wife, Bernadette.

Brennan died of cancer on July 2, 2009, at Cedars Sinai Hospital in Los Angeles at the age of 57. He was survived by his wife, Bernadette O'Neill.
