= Armando del Moral =

Spanish journalist and publicist

- Armando del Moral Vizcaíno
- Born: June 15, 1916; Albacete, Spain
- Died: July 22, 2009 (aged 93); North Hollywood, California, United States
- Occupation: Journalist • publicist
- Known for: Golden Globe Awards

Armando del Moral Vizcaíno (June 15, 1916 – July 22, 2009) was a Spanish-born American film journalist and publicist. Del Moral helped to establish the Golden Globe Awards while working as a Hollywood Foreign Correspondents Association officer. The organization is now known as the Hollywood Foreign Press Association.

== Biography ==
Armando del Moral Vizcaíno was born in Albacete in 1916. He collaborated as a writer in the anarchist press. A member of the Catalan branch of the Libertarian Youth, he was wounded in Baena during the Civil War. He went on to serve as secretary for propaganda of Solidaridad Internacional Antifascista (SIA) in Barcelona.

Del Moral fled Spain for Mexico in 1939 as a refugee of the Spanish Civil War. He covered the fledgling Mexican film industry, before moving to the United States in 1943.

Armando del Moral became the Vice President of the Hollywood Foreign Correspondents Association and helped to found the Golden Globe Awards. As Vice President, Del Moral also became both host and presenter for several Golden Globe Award ceremonies. He remained active with the Mexican film industry as well. Del Moral oversaw contract negotiations for Mexican actors who took roles in Hollywood. He also served as the Hollywood representative of the Mexican film actors union, Asociación Nacional de Actores (ANDA).

Del Moral also worked as a Spanish-language publicist for several Hollywood film campaigns and releases. In particular, Del Moral worked as a Spanish publicist for the 1960 George Sidney film, Pepe. He also worked as an advisor on The Magnificent Seven and wrote Spanish-language publicity pieces for Walt Disney. In October 1962, del Moral interviewed US singer Elvis Presley, whose then impending travel to Mexico to do the location shoot for Paramount's¨Fun in Acapulco" had been banned by the Mexican authorities following a series of anti-Presley incidents starting in 1957. The article, headlined "Baffled by Mexican boycott" was published in "Ësto¨, a quite popular entertainment magazine based in Mexico and for which Del Moral provided numerorus articles.

Del Moral wrote and edited the Cine-Grafica magazine, which covers the Hispanic entertainment industry in Los Angeles, for more than 30 years. Additionally, Del Moral hosted programs on KXLA and KMEX and wrote and produced a 1950s Spanish-language soap opera, Maria Elena.

Armando del Moral died of natural causes on July 21, 2009, in North Hollywood, California, at the age of 93. He was survived by his daughter and two sons. Del Moral was buried in Forest Lawn Memorial Park in Glendale, California.
