= American City Business Journals =

American newspaper chain

American City Business Journals, Inc.
- Type: Subsidiary
- Industry: Publishing
- Founded: 1982; 44 years ago
- Founder: Mike Russell
- Headquarters: Charlotte, North Carolina, U.S.
- Area served: United States
- Key people: Whitney Shaw (chairman & CEO)
- Products: Magazines; newspapers; mass media
- Number of employees: 1,400 (2021)
- Parent: Advance Publications (1995–present)
- Website: acbj.com

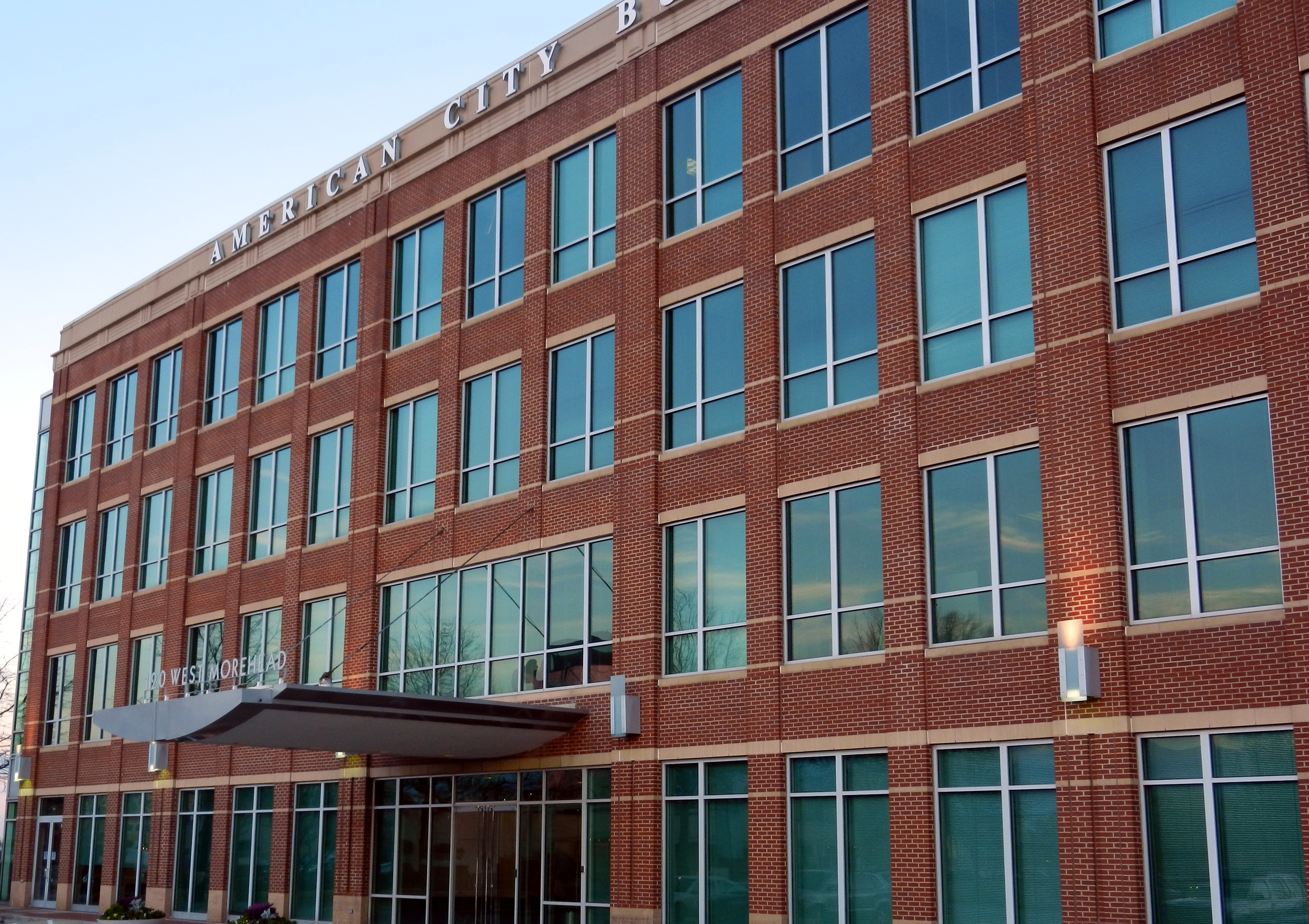
The company's corporate headquarters in Charlotte, North Carolina

American City Business Journals, Inc. (ACBJ) is an American newspaper publisher based in Charlotte, North Carolina. ACBJ publishes The Business Journals, which contain local business news for 44 markets in the United States, with each edition named after its respective market. The company also publishes Hemmings Motor News and Inside Lacrosse. Owned by Advance Publications, ACBJ receives revenue from weekly print display and classified advertisements, digital advertising, and a subscription business model.

The bizjournals.com website, using the overarching online title The Business Journal, contains local business news from various cities in the United States, along with an archive that contains more than 5 million business news articles published since 1996. As of August 2021, it received over 3.6 million readers each week.

== History ==
American City Business Journals, Inc. was founded in 1982 by Mike K. Russell with the launch of the Kansas City Business Journal. Three years later the business became a public company via an initial public offering and was traded as an over the counter stock. Starting 1985, ACBJ set out to acquire as many as fifty business newspapers across the United States. The goal was to establish a network of newspapers selling national advertising packages.

In 1986, ABJC acquired all the publications owned by Mark Vittert and his company, Business Journal Publications Corp, for $40 million. The sale included business journals in Cincinnati, Baltimore, Pittsburgh, Philadelphia and St. Louis. Later that year American City merged with Scripps Howard Business Journals. At the time the division of Scripps-Howard Newspapers operated publications in 10 cities: Los Angeles, Seattle, San Diego, San Francisco, Dallas-Fort Worth, Houston, Phoenix, Atlanta, Washington, D.C and Miami/Fort Lauderdale.

After expanding to 35 weeklies, ABJC faced mounting debts and losses reaching $13.5 million in the first nine months of 1987. This resulted from sales of national advertising packages falling short of goals amid the 1987 stock market crash. The company began divesting in 1988. ACBJ sold eight publications to various unnamed buyers, including five business newspapers in Westchester, Rochester, Richmond, Hartford and Southern Connecticut; St. Louis Magazine and partial-ownership of two legal papers: St. Louis Daily Record and St. Louis Countian. Two weeks later ACBJ sold another six of its business newspapers in Philadelphia, Pittsburgh, Milwaukee, Indianapolis and San Jose and Sacramento to Metro Collegiate Publications for $46.3 million. Then Russell sold his controlling stake in the company.

In 1989, Shaw Publishing, Inc., owned by Ray Shaw and The Oklahoma Publish Co., purchased a million shares of common stock in ACBJ for $22.75 million. Shaw was then elected as the company's chairman and chief executive officer. Previously he retired earlier in the year from working as president of Dow Jones & Company. Shaw served as ABJC's chairman for two decades. Under his leadership, the company moved its headquarters from Kansas City, Missouri, to Charlotte, North Carolina, and greatly increased the number of its publications. In 1995, ACBJ was acquired by Advance Publications for US$258.8 million (equivalent to $498.7 million in 2025). A year later ACBJ acquired CityMedia Inc., which published six business journals in Boston, Philadelphia, Pittsburgh, Milwaukee, Minneapolis and Sacramento.

In 2001, the company partnered with Microsoft to provide content for bcentral.com.

In 2007, the company acquired Inside Lacrosse.

In 2012, sister company Condé Nast redirected Portfolio.com to the startups page of ACBJ.

In 2020, the company launched a book publishing partnership.

== Annual awards ==
The publication publishes the following annual awards for each city:

- The Business Journal's Forty Under 40 lists the 40 most successful entrepreneurs under the age of 40. It has been published since 1992.

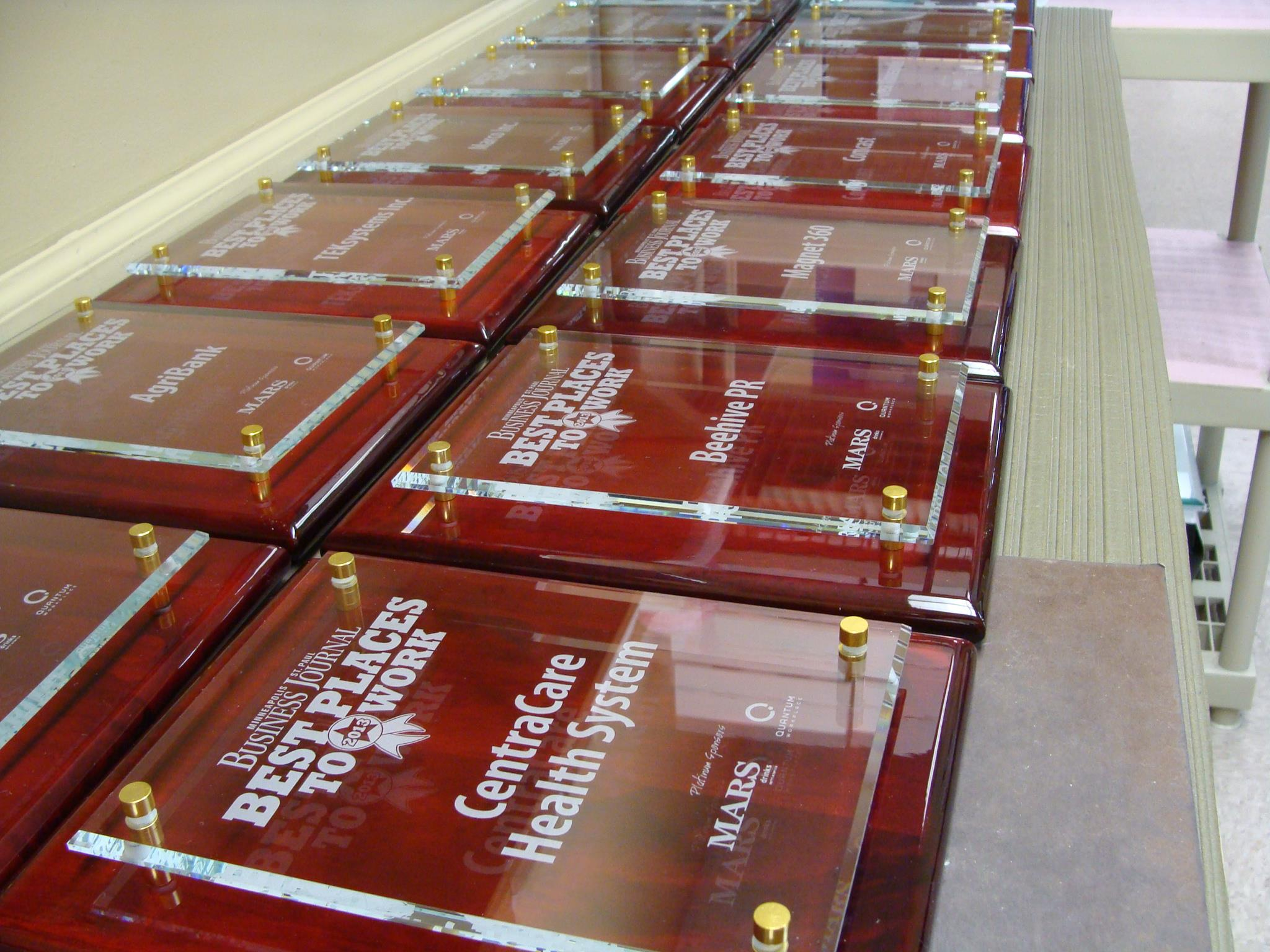
The Minneapolis/St. Paul Business Journal's Best Places to Work awards

- The Business Journal's Best Places to Work ranks top businesses in local areas for best employee experience. Rankings are determined based on surveys on leadership, corporate culture, and communications. Different cities can use different methodologies and rank a different number of employers.

== List of publications ==
=== City business publications ===
As of 2023, American City Business Journals (ACBJ) publishes print copies of 44 different newspapers, addressing business news in 44 different cities, generally under the names City or Region name + Business + Journal (33 cities) or First (5) or Times (2) or Chronicle (1) or Courier (1) or News (1) or Review (1).

Title	City	Note
Albany Business Review	Albany, New York	Founded in 1974 as Capital District Business Review. Also previously known as Capital District Business Review and The Business Review.
Albuquerque Business First	Albuquerque, New Mexico	Formerly known as New Mexico Business Weekly until the name was changed in December 2012.
Atlanta Business Chronicle	Atlanta, Georgia	Acquired in 1986 from merger with Scripps Howard Business Journals.
Austin Business Journal	Austin, Texas	
Baltimore Business Journal	Baltimore, Maryland	Acquired in 1986 from Business Journal Publications Corp.
Birmingham Business Journal	Birmingham, Alabama	Founded in 1983 by Michael C. Randle and Tina Verciglio-Savas. Acquired in 1999.
Boston Business Journal	Boston, Massachusetts	Founded by Robert Bergenheim and launched on March 2, 1981. The newspaper was originally named "P&L The Boston Business Journal" ("P&L" stood for profit and loss). However, "P&L" was later dropped from the name. Acquired in 1996 with purchase of CityMedia Inc.
Buffalo Business First	Buffalo, New York	
Charlotte Business Journal	Charlotte, North Carolina	
Cincinnati Business Courier	Cincinnati, Ohio	Acquired in 1986 from Business Journal Publications Corp.
Cleveland Business Journal	Cleveland, Ohio	
Columbus Business First	Columbus, Ohio	
Dallas Business Journal	Dallas, Texas	Acquired in 1986 from merger with Scripps Howard Business Journals.
Dayton Business Journal	Dayton, Ohio	
Denver Business Journal	Denver, Colorado	Acquired by ACBJ in 1989
Houston Business Journal	Houston, Texas	Acquired in 1986 from merger with Scripps Howard Business Journals.
Jacksonville Business Journal	Jacksonville, Florida	
Kansas City Business Journal	Kansas City, Missouri	The first publication of the eventual ACBJ, co-founded by Michael K. Russell and William Worley in August 1982.
Louisville Business First	Louisville, Kentucky	Founded on August 13, 1984, by publisher Mike Kallay.
Memphis Business Journal	Memphis, Tennessee	Founded by Ward Archer as Mid-South Business in 1979.
Milwaukee Business Journal	Milwaukee, Wisconsin	Acquired in 1996 from CityMedia Inc.
Minneapolis/St. Paul Business Journal	Minneapolis, Minnesota	Acquired in 1996 from CityMedia Inc.
Nashville Business Journal	Nashville, Tennessee	
Orlando Business Journal	Orlando, Florida	Founded in 1984.
Pacific Business News	Honolulu, Hawaii	Started by entrepreneur George Mason and former Honolulu Star-Bulletin editor John Ramsey. In 1983, Mason sold the newspaper to ACBJ.
Philadelphia Business Journal	Philadelphia, Pennsylvania	Founded in 1982, acquired in 1996 with purchase of CityMedia Inc.
Phoenix Business Journal	Phoenix, Arizona	Founded in 1980. Acquired in 1986 from merger with Scripps Howard Business Journals.
Pittsburgh Business Times	Pittsburgh, Pennsylvania	Founded in 1981, acquired in 1986 from Business Journal Publications Corp. Sold in 1988. Reacquired in 1996 with purchase of CityMedia Inc.
Portland Business Journal	Portland, Oregon	
Puget Sound Business Journal	Seattle, Washington	Acquired in 1986 from merger with Scripps Howard Business Journals. In 2010, the newspaper was a finalist for a Pulitzer Prize.
Sacramento Business Journal	Sacramento, California	Acquired in 1996 with purchase of CityMedia Inc.
St. Louis Business Journal	St. Louis, Missouri	Established in 1980 with Dan Keough at the helm; acquired in 1986 with purchase of Business Journal Publications by ACBJ.
San Antonio Business Journal	San Antonio, Texas	
San Francisco Business Times	San Francisco, California	Acquired in 1986 with purchase of Scripps Howard Business Journals. In 2008, East Bay Business Times was merged into the San Francisco Business Times.
Silicon Valley Business Journal	San Jose, California	Founded as San Jose Business Journal
South Florida Business Journal	Miami, Florida	Founded in 1980 as Miami Business, it changed its name in 1983. Acquired in 1986 from merger with Scripps Howard Business Journals.
Tampa Bay Business Journal	Tampa, Florida	Founded as Tampa Bay Business in 1981, renamed for a period starting in late 1990s as The Business Journal Serving Tampa Bay.
Triad Business Journal	Greensboro, North Carolina	Founded by ACBJ in 1998.
Triangle Business Journal	Raleigh, North Carolina	
Washington Business Journal	Washington, D.C.	Acquired in 1986 from merger with Scripps Howard Business Journals.
Wichita Business Journal	Wichita, Kansas	

=== Other publications ===
- Hemmings Classic Car - Launched in 1970 as Special Interest Autos, which was acquired by ACBJ in April 2002 with the purchase of Hemmings Motor News Publishing, renamed in 2004
- Hemmings Motor News - Launched in 1954, acquired by ACBJ in April 2002 with the purchase of Hemmings Motor News Publishing
- Hemmings Muscle Machines - Launched in 2003 by ACBJ
- Inside Lacrosse - Launched in 1996, acquired by ACBJ in 2007

=== Online only ===
- L.A. Business First
- Chicago Business Journal
- Cleveland Business Journal – Launched in May 2020
- New York Business Journal
- Providence Business First
- The Business Journals - in addition to links to the websites of the individual city business publications, this main page curates an assortment of direct links to some of the current week's stories from across the company's websites
