= Eisberg (Moosbach) =

Mountain in Germany

Coordinates: 49°32′26″N 12°24′10″E

Eisenberg (Moosbach) is a 771 meters above sea level mountain, located south of the village of Rückersrieth and belongs to the municipality of Moosbach in the eastern part of the district of Neustadt an der Waldnaab. It is the highest elevation in the municipality. In records of the surveying office and old documents, the mountain is also known as Eisberg, Ameisenberg, Romersberg or Radmannsberg. The name Eisberg is common among the population. In 2013, at the request of the responsible surveying office, the name Eisenberg was established as the official name.

In the Middle Ages, ores were mined in the area of the hill to extract iron.

During the Cold War, a permanent deployment position (DEST) of the Bundeswehr 's low-level aircraft reporting service TMLD was set up there. Permanent facilities, accommodation and storage facilities for technical equipment were built. With the end of the Cold War, the need for such air surveillance was eliminated and the position on the Eisenberg was abandoned.

The fenced area and the now privately used barracks are still evidence of this past.

The exact name of the position on the Eisenberg was Naila, 16./Fernmelderegiment 32 ( Frankenwald-Kaserne )(Honey Pot), in short 16./FmRgt 32 Naila; Echo 4: Moosbach-Rückersrieth / Eisberg.

There is a 6 km long cross-country ski trail on the Eisenberg. The municipality decided that using the former military area for tourism was not feasible.

== See also ==
- List of mountains of Bavaria
