= Annagul Annakuliyeva =

Turkmen soprano opera singer and film actress (1924–2009)

Annagul Annakuliyeva Annagül Annagulyýewa
- Born: December 31, 1924; Gasan-Kuliysky rayon, Turkmen SSR, Soviet Union (now Esenguly District, Turkmenistan)
- Died: July 18, 2009 (aged 84) Ashgabat, Turkmenistan
- Occupations: Opera singer, actress

Annagul Annamyradovna Annaguliyeva (Note: Turkmen: Annagül Annamyradowna Annagulyýewa; Russian: Аннагуль Аннамурадовна Аннакулиева, romanized: Annagul Annamuradovna Annakuliyeva; Sometimes given as Annagul Annamuratovna Annakuliyeva) (31 December 1924 – 18 July 2009) was a Turkmen soprano opera singer and film actress of the Soviet era. Annakuliyeva was the first internationally known opera singer to emerge from Turkmenistan.

Annakuliyeva first began singing at the Turkmen Opera and Ballet Theater in Ashkhabad, Turkmen Soviet Socialist Republic of the Soviet Union in 1941. She starred as the lead role in the opera, Zohre and Tahyr, at the theater.

Annakuliyeva performed throughout the Soviet Union during her theater and opera career. She also appeared in a number of Soviet films, some of which were directed by her husband, director Alty Garliyev. Annakuliyeva was named a People's Artist of the USSR by the Soviet government in recognition of her professional accomplishments in the arts, especially opera.

The President of Turkmenistan Saparmurat Niyazov officially banned opera in the country in 2001. However, Niyazov's successor, Gurbanguly Berdimuhamedow, lifted the ban in 2008, making opera legal in Turkmenistan again.

Annagul Annakuliyeva died on 18 July 2009, in Ashgabat, Turkmenistan, at the age of 84 after a long illness.
