= Robert E. L. Taylor =

American publisher

Robert E. Lee Taylor Jr. (June 8, 1913 – July 2, 2009) was an American publisher and chairman of the Philadelphia Bulletin in the years leading up to the paper's demise. He was jailed in 1963 for his refusal to testify before a grand jury about his paper's reporting, and was released after the Pennsylvania Supreme Court ruled that his actions were protected under the state's shield law.

== Early life and education ==
Taylor was born in Norfolk, Virginia, and grew up in Baltimore, Maryland. He attended Princeton University, graduating in 1935. Taylor started work at the Philadelphia Bulletin after graduating from college — where his uncle Robert McLean was publisher, and owned the paper together with his brothers and sisters — and worked at the paper for nearly 40 years, other than during World War II, when he served in the United States Navy.

== Philadelphia Bulletin ==
As the paper's president in 1963, he and other staff members at the Bulletin were ordered to testify before a grand jury investigating municipal corruption and were required to furnish details of the sources for the paper's stories. Upon refusing, Taylor and city editor Earl Selby were held in jail for contempt of court. By a 6–1 vote, the Supreme Court of Pennsylvania overturned the sentences to five days in jail and a fine of $1,000, ruling that the state's 1937 shield law covered documents and individuals. In his majority opinion, Chief Justice John C. Bell Jr. stated that in cases where there is a doubt, "the statute must be liberally construed in favor of the newspaper and the media".

In March 1964, McClean stepped down as publisher, having served in that position since 1961, with Taylor succeeding him as publisher and keeping his post as the paper's president. At the time, the Bulletin's daily circulation of 700,000 made it the city's largest and one of the largest of all afternoon papers nationwide. The ascendancy of The Philadelphia Inquirer combined with the loss of popularity of afternoon papers led to a significant drop in both advertisers and readership. McLean stepped down as chairman after 61 years at the paper in April 1975, and Taylor was named as his successor as chairman and chief executive officer, with William L. McLean 3rd named editor and publisher to succeed Taylor. In his role as chairman, he oversaw the paper's sale in 1981. The paper ceased publication as of January 29, 1982, after 135 years in business, having dominated its market for most of its life.

== Personal life ==
Taylor died at age 96 on July 2, 2009, at his home in Bryn Mawr, Pennsylvania. He was survived by two daughters, a son, six grandchildren and one great-grandchild. His two marriages, to Leonore McAlpin Shiland and Jane Matthews Jackson, both ended with the death of his spouse.
