= Stelios Georgousopoulos =

Greek sailor

Personal information
- Full name: Stylianos "Stelios" Georgosopulos
- Nationality: Greece
- Born: 28 July 1965; Greece
- Died: 28 April 2009 (aged 43)
- Resting place: Anastaseos Cemetery
- Height: 1.85 m (6 ft 1 in)
- Weight: 68 kg (150 lb)

Sport
- Sport: Windsurfing

Stelios Georgousopoulos (28 July 1965 - 28 April 2009) was a Greek windsurfer. He competed in the 1984 Summer Olympics and the 1988 Summer Olympics.
