= Eisberg (Eastern Upper Lusatia) =

Coordinates: 50°59′30″N 14°47′00″E

Highest point
- Elevation: 330.8 m (1,085 ft)

Geography
- Location: Saxony, Germany

Eisberg (Upper Sorbian: Lodowc) is a mountain of Saxony, southeastern Germany.
