= John Marshall (American sculptor) =

American sculptor

John "Jack" Marshall was an American artist best known for his sculptures.

== Biography ==
Marshall was born in Quincy, Massachusetts, on February 27, 1932, son of Francis J. and Josephine (Ghigli) Marshall. He enlisted in the U.S. Army for three years as a linguistic specialist and was honorably discharged June 5, 1951.

He received a Bachelor of Arts degree in design from the Massachusetts College of Art. He obtained a graduate degree from Boston University in studio arts and one from the Yale School of Architecture in environmental design and installation art on a full scholarship.

He died on July 7, 2009, at his home in Keene, New Hampshire, at the age of 77.

== Achievements ==
Marshall held patents for the “Foam Method of Cementitious Casting” and “A Fiber-Optic Perception Device.”

His awards include: first place award in sculpture: New Haven and Providence Arts Festivals, four prizes for sculpture at The New England Annuals Arts and Crafts Festival at Silvermine Guild Arts Center in New Canaan, Connecticut, the Olivetti Award for Contemporary Sculpture and a Ford Foundation Purchase Award. He also received grants from: Blanche Coleman Foundation, Whiting Foundation, Spaulding-Potter Foundation, Thorne-Sagendorph Trust, DuPont Corp., Union Carbide Corp., the American Society of Plastics Engineers and the Comune di Santa Croce sull’Arno for a traveling exhibit throughout Tuscany.

Marshall's works have been shown regionally at the Fuller Museum in Brockton, Massachusetts, DeCordova Museum in Lincoln, Massachusetts, Baak Gallery in Cambridge, and Carl Siembab, Sunne Savage and Ellie Reiglehaupt Galleries on Newbury Street in Boston; in New York City at the Whitney Biennial, the Awards Exhibit of the American Academy and Institute of Arts and Letters, the American Institute of Architecture, Lever House, The New School, Allan Stone Gallery and most recently in a solo show at Ward Nasse Gallery in SoHo, Manhattan. In Europe he has had shows in Milan, Pisa, Florence, Copenhagen, Geneva and Zurich. His work is in numerous collections, many of which are monumental commissions: public and private in this country and internationally. He recently retired professor emeritus from teaching after almost 30 years as director of 3-D Studies at Keene State College, prior to which he had taught at the schools of Art and Architecture at Yale, the New School for Social Research and Manhattanville College. He had studios in Keene, New Hampshire, and Carrara, Italy.
