= Eisberg (Reiter Alpe) =

Mountain in the Berchtesgaden Alps, Bavaria, Germany

Coordinates: 47°37′33″N 12°50′50″E

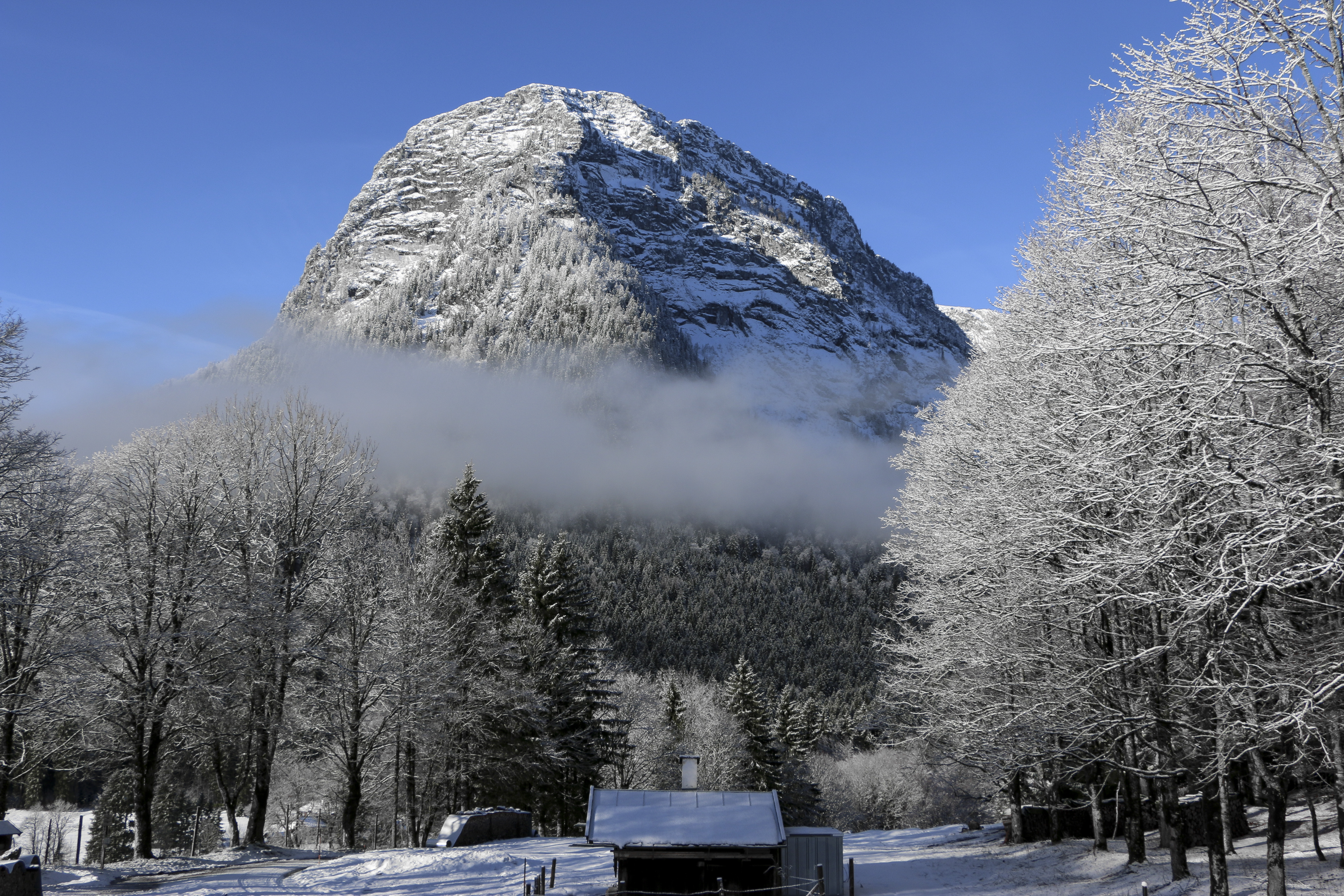
- Eisberg, north face

Highest point
- Elevation: 1,799 m (5,902 ft)

Geography
- Location: Bavaria, Germany

Eisberg (also known as Eisberg (Reiter Alpe)) is a mountain with an elevation of 1,799 metres (5,902 ft) in the Reiter Alpe (Reiter Alm) massif of the Berchtesgaden Alps. It is located in the municipality of Ramsau bei Berchtesgaden, Bavaria, Germany, near the border with Austria.

The mountain forms part of a high karst plateau and lies within the scenic area of the Berchtesgaden National Park region. Its steep north face is a notable landmark visible from the valley.

== Geography ==
Eisberg is the 29th highest summit in the Reiter Alpe range. It has a prominence of approximately 456 m and its key col is at 1,343 m. The summit offers panoramic views over the surrounding Berchtesgaden Alps and the Austrian mountains to the south.

== Hiking and access ==
A demanding mountain trail classified as T3 (difficult mountain hike) on the SAC hiking scale leads to the summit. The route requires sure-footedness, a good head for heights and involves some exposed sections.

The most common approach starts from trails on the Reiter Alm plateau and can be combined with a visit to the nearby Neue Traunsteiner Hütte mountain hut. The hike is popular with experienced hikers but is not recommended for beginners.
