= Apostolic Vicariate of Savannakhet =

Catholic missionary jurisdiction in Laos

Apostolic Vicariate of Savannakhet Vicariatus Apostolicus Savannakhetensis ອັກຄະສາວົກແທນຂອງສະຫວັນນະເຂດ

Location
- Country: Laos
- Metropolitan: Immediately subject to the Holy See
- Coordinates: 17°23′39″N 104°48′30″E

Statistics
- Area: 48,100 km^{2} (18,600 sq mi)
- Population: Total; Catholics: (as of 2010); 1,325,966; 13,565 (1%)

Information
- Denomination: Roman Catholic
- Rite: Latin Rite
- Cathedral: Cathedral of St Louis in Thakhek

Current leadership
- Pope: Leo XIV
- Apostolic Vicar: Jean Marie Vianney Prida Inthirath
- Bishops emeritus: Pierre-Antonio-Jean Bach Vicar Apostolic Emeritus (1971–1975)

Map
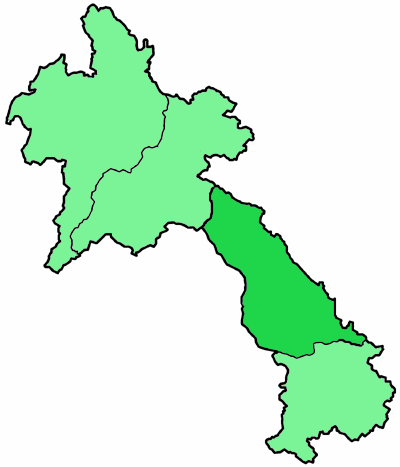

The Apostolic Vicariate of Savannakhet (Latin: Vicariatus Apostolicus Savannakhetensis) is a territorial jurisdiction of the Catholic Church in Laos. As an apostolic vicariate, it is a pre-diocesan jurisdiction, entitled to a titular bishop. It is located in central Laos.

It is exempt, i.e., not part of any ecclesiastical province and directly dependent on the Holy See and its missionary Dicastery for Evangelization.

The vicariate covers an area of 48,100 km^{2} in central Laos, including the provinces of Savannakhet, Khammouan and part of Bolikhamxai. By land area, it is the largest of the apostolic vicariates in Laos. Approximately 12,500 of the 2.7 million people living within the vicariate are members of the Catholic Church. The vicariate has 54 parishes, and only 6 priests.

== History ==
The Apostolic Vicariate of Savannakhet was originally established as the Prefecture Apostolic of Thakhek on 21 December 1950, when the Vicariate Apostolic of Laos was split into two parts. The western part in Thailand was renamed the Vicariate Apostolic of Thare, while the Laotian part was formed into a new prefecture. On 24 February 1958 it was elevated to an Apostolic Vicariate. In 1963 the name was changed to Savannakhet, even though its see remained in Thakhek, Khammouan province. In 1967 the southern part of the vicariate was erected as the independent Vicariate Apostolic of Paksé.

== Ordinaries ==
=== Apostolic Vicars of Savannakhet ===
- Jean-Rosière-Eugène Arnaud, M.E.P. (1950-1969)
- Pierre-Antonio-Jean Bach, M.E.P. (1971-1975)
- Jean-Baptiste Outhay Thepmany (1975-1997)
- Jean Sommeng Vorachak (1997-2009)
- Jean Marie Vianney Prida Inthirath (2010–present)
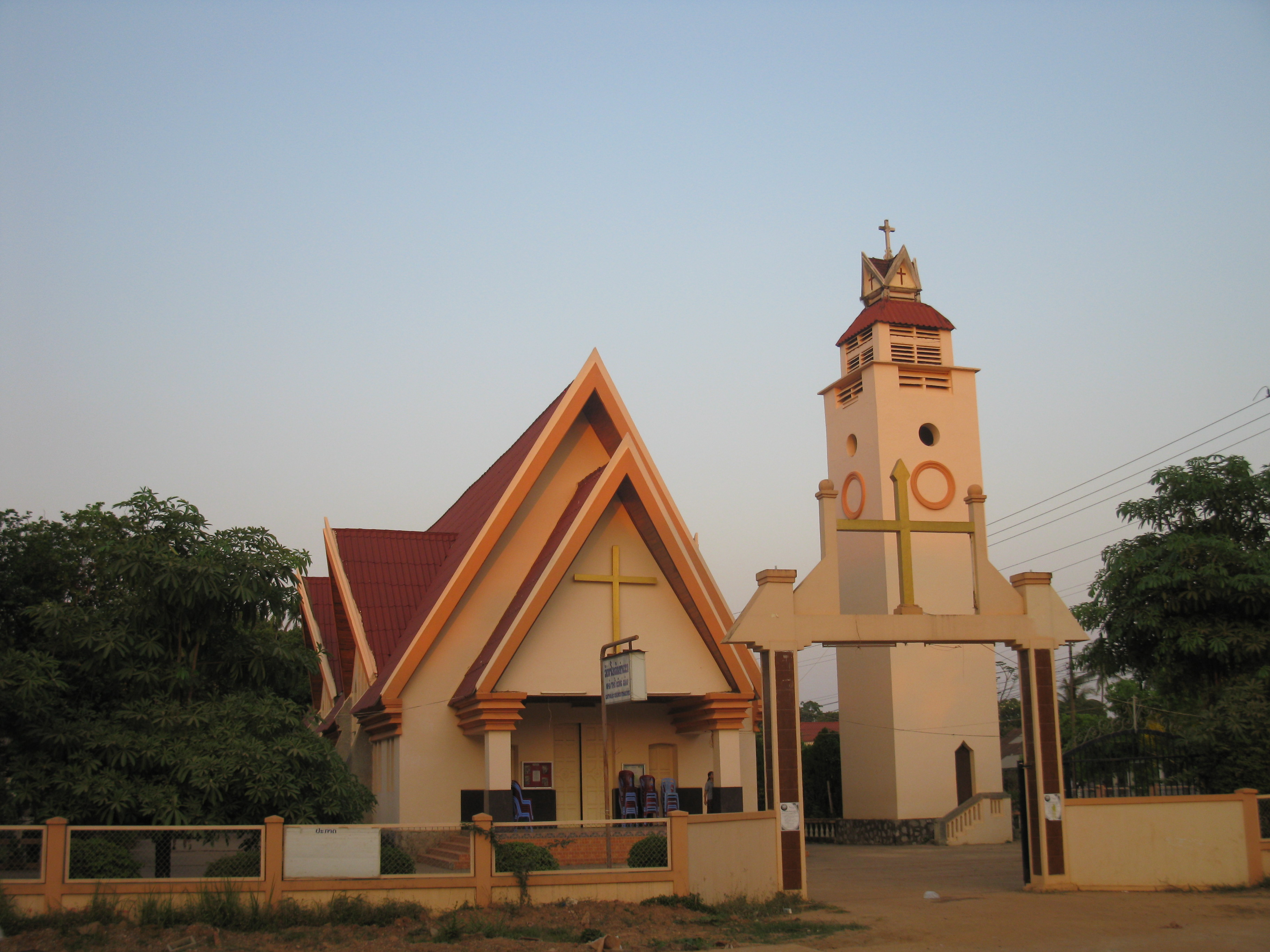
Catholic Church in Thakhek.

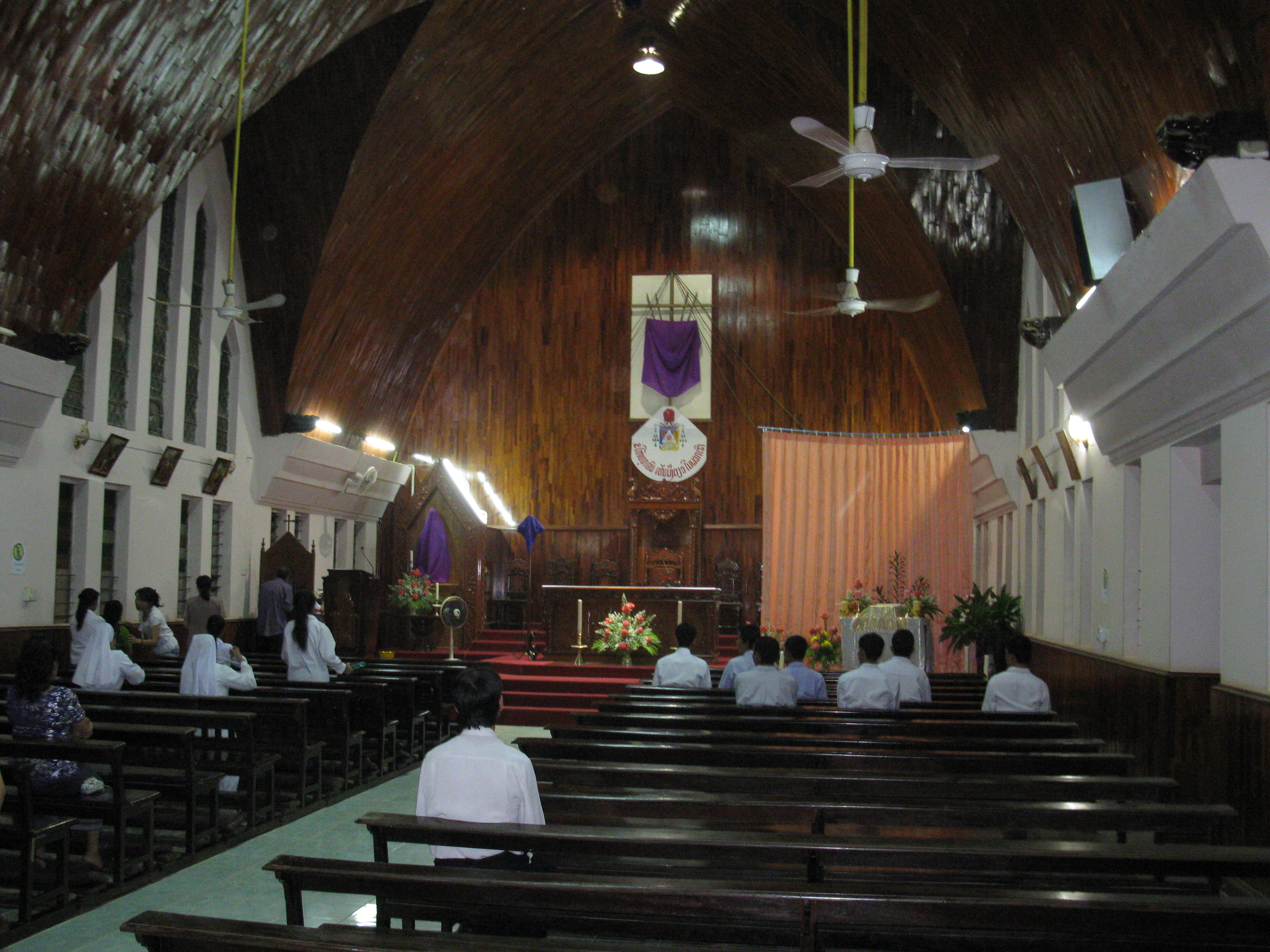
Catholic Church in Thakhek.

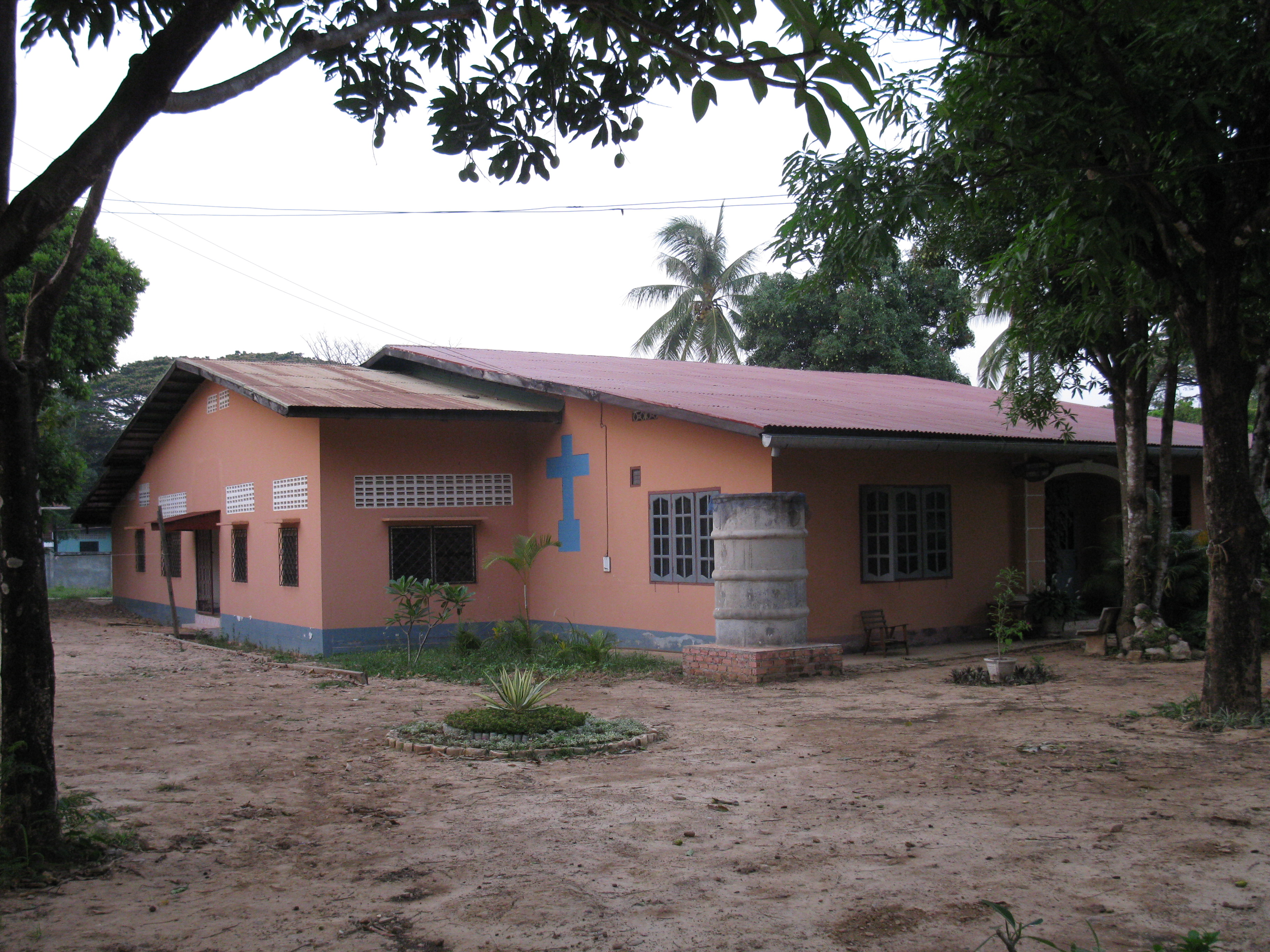
Catholic Minor Seminary in Thakhek.

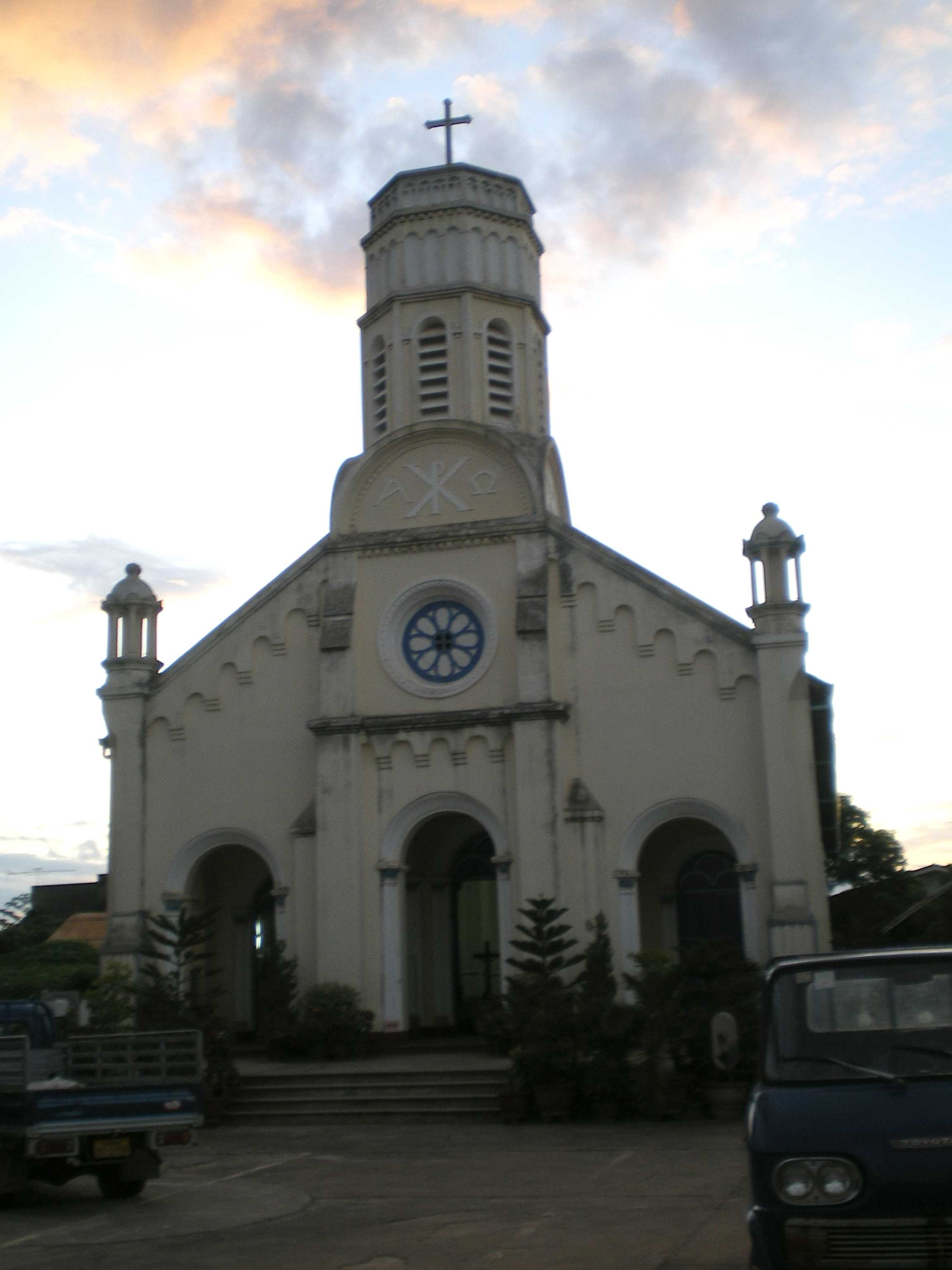
Catholic Church in Savannakhet
