= Joseph C. Muren =

Second Quorum of the Seventy
- April 6, 1991 (aged 55) – October 5, 1996 (aged 60)
- Called by: Ezra Taft Benson
- End reason: Honorably released

Personal details
- Born: Joseph Carl Muren; February 5, 1936; Richmond, California, United States
- Died: July 27, 2009 (aged 73); Layton, Utah, United States

Joseph Carl Muren (February 5, 1936 – July 27, 2009) was a general authority of the Church of Jesus Christ of Latter-day Saints (LDS Church) from 1991 to 1996. He also taught institute classes at Weber State College. He authored a soft bound book titled "Causes and affects of inactivity in the Church."

== Early life ==
Muren was born in Richmond, California. His father was of Slovenian descent and his mother was of Italian descent. He was raised as a Roman Catholic.

As a student at San José State University, Muren had a Latter-day Saint roommate, and from this he learned about the LDS Church and got baptized. This ended Muren's chances of inheriting the family business.

== LDS Church service ==
Muren then served as a Mormon missionary in Argentina. Afterwards, he was a high school mathematics teacher while he earned his master's degree from San José State. In 1963, Muren married Gladys Smith in the Los Angeles California Temple. Muren then got his doctorate degree from the University of Southern California.

Muren was an institute instructor for the LDS Church. He first taught at the institute adjacent to El Camino College. After teaching at several institutes, Muren served as president of the Costa Rica San José Mission of the church from 1977 to 1980. This mission covered Nicaragua and Muren was involved in both pulling out missionaries and sending them back in amidst war during the fall of 1978. After this mission Muren served as director of temporal affairs for the church in Peru. Later he held the same position in Argentina and Australia and in 1989, he assumed the same position in England.

Muren was called as member of the church's Second Quorum of the Seventy in April 1991. In 1993, Muren was serving in the presidency of the Europe Mediterranean Area of the church. Muren also served for a time as president of the Central America Area of the church.

In October 1996, Muren was released as a member of the Second Quorum of the Seventy and as a general authority of the LDS Church. He died in 2009 in Layton, Utah.
