= Steven Miessner =

American administrator (1960–2009)

Steven Paul Miessner (September 26, 1960 – July 29, 2009) was an American administrator of the Academy Awards for the Academy of Motion Picture Arts and Sciences. Miessner was nicknamed the "Keeper of the Oscars" for his dedication to the administration of the golden statuette awarded during the film industry's most important award ceremony.

Miessner joined the staff of the Academy of Motion Picture Arts and Sciences in 2002. He became responsible for the upkeep, administration and security of the Oscar statues for the Academy Awards. His position was a year-round responsibility. Miessner would take responsibility of the Oscar statuettes upon their arrival at the Academy from the R.S. Owens & Company in Chicago, which manufactures the awards. Following their arrival, Miessner would enter each individual Oscar into a computer file to keep a record for the Academy. He was then responsible for the Oscars' safety and security until the awards ceremony. Miessner could be seen each Oscar night polishing and inspecting each statue with white gloves before they were handed out to recipients.

Additionally, Miessner created a database and record of each Oscar that has ever been awarded by the Academy. He functioned as a liaison between the Academy and R.S. Owens & Company, the foundry which makes the statues, when an older Oscar needed repair or refurbishment. Miessner also worked as the executive assistant for both Academy President Sid Ganis and the organization's executive director Bruce Davis. A spokesperson for the Academy described Miessner as "central to the day-to-day operations of the organization" in 2009.

Steven Miessner died of a heart attack at his home in Los Angeles on July 29, 2009, at the age of 48. He was survived by his mother, Virginia, his sister and his brother. He remained with the Academy until his death.
