= Ray Shaw (journalist) =

American journalist

Coy Ray Shaw (March 28, 1934 - July 19, 2009) was an American journalist for the Associated Press in the 1950s in Oklahoma City, Louisville (Kentucky) and New York City.

Shaw became president and chief operating officer of Wall Street Journal publisher Dow Jones & Company and later owned, with a partner, a controlling interest in American City Business Journals (ACBJ) in 1989, selling that company in 1995 to Advance Publications and continuing as chairman.

As Shaw described it, he left Dow Jones on Friday and flew to Kansas City, Missouri, on Wednesday to buy a few business journals. Mike Russell, who started ACBJ, suggested selling him the company. During Shaw's tenure, ACBJ moved its headquarters from Kansas City to Charlotte, North Carolina, and increased its total number of employees from 850 to over 1900. The company added a number of magazines and other media under Shaw. Included among ACBJ's publications are more than 40 weekly business journals.

The Society of American Business Editors and Writers gave Shaw its Lifetime Achievement Award.

Shaw died on July 19, 2009, at age 75 after sustaining a wasp sting. He is survived by wife Kay, sons Whitney and Kirk (whose publishing business he had planned to help with), daughter Beth, and seven grandchildren. At the time of his death, Shaw was chairman of American City Business Journals.
