= Barbara Barlow =

American pediatric surgeon

Barbara Barlow is an American pediatric surgeon who was the first woman to train in that specialty at Babies Hospital, present-day Morgan Stanley Children's Hospital. She has also reduced the amount of injuries for inner-city children through her research and efforts to educate the public on prevention of accidents.

== Early life and education ==
Barlow was born in a rural town in Pennsylvania in 1938. Her mother returned to school and obtained a degree in psychology in 1954 after her father's death in order to become a guidance counselor and assistant professor and support Barlow and her sister. From her mother, Barlow learned the importance of and found the inspiration to work hard in life. Barlow went on to study psychology at Vassar College in New York and then attended the Albert Einstein College of Medicine in New York City and earned her M.D. degree in 1967. She then received a training fellowship at Babies Hospital Columbia University Medical Center, where she was the first woman to ever train in pediatric surgery there.

== Career ==
While completing her residency in the Bronx, Barlow noticed the severe lack of quality pediatric care in the area. She was inspired to provide children living in lower socioeconomic areas with the same care that middle- and upper-class children received. One thing she particularly noticed was the number of preventable accidents the children in the area suffered from. Upon researching, she found that the injury rate for the Bronx and surrounding area was twice the national average. She also found that the most severe accidents were caused by falls from windows. She was one of the key figures in a New York City ordinance that required landlords to install window guards and participated in the educational campaign "Children Can't Fly," which warned parents about the risk of children falling from high-rise building windows. The campaign, which was created in the early 1970s, created a law that stated in apartments where small children live, there must be window guards. Also, the campaign employed nurses to go and check on children who were reported to have fallen. The nurses also are able to help the parents in dealing with the situation and provide advice to prevent it from happening again. Within the Bronx district, the reported number of falls has decreased by 50%. Injuries due to children falling out of windows in the Washington Heights neighborhood decreased by 96 percent by 1981.

The conditions of community spaces, such as school playgrounds in the Harlem neighborhood and streets where young children frequently played after school, were also a concern of Barlow. In 1988 she began work on improving Harlem's playgrounds with the help of a grant from the Robert Wood Johnson Foundation by working with an architect to design low-cost playground equipment. Also in 1988, she helped create the Injury Prevention Program at Harlem Hospital Center. This program helped to decrease the occurrence of injuries in children. The program was able to help lower the rate of injuries in children by improving education, building better playgrounds, and also providing supervised mentors to watch the children. She has continued her work on injury prevention in children for the past 15 years. Since 1991, Harlem has gotten 40 plus new playgrounds and numerous new after-school activities are offered through community organizations.

Barlow also founded "Injury Free Coalition for Kids," through which she has been able to ensure that similar programs are operating in cities across the nation, such as Los Angeles, Atlanta, Philadelphia. The "Injury Free Coalition for Kids" has implemented Injury Prevention Programs in 42 different trauma centers. This program helps promote safe ways for children when playing outside. The program also brings more medical professionals into an area where injury is prone in order to reduce the rates of injury. She continues her work through the National Association of Children's Hospitals.

Barlow is now retired. Her last position was a professor in epidemiology at Columbia University Mailman School of Public Health in New York.

== Honors and awards ==
Barlow has received multiple awards for her "Injury Free Coalition for Kids" Program. In 2001, Barlow was awarded the Alma Dea Morani, MD Renaissance Woman Award by the Women in Medicine Legacy Foundation. This prestigious award is given to notable female physicians who have furthered medical practice and challenged traditional stereotypes of women in medicine. She was also the recipient of the CDC Foundation Hero Award in 2011. She has also been recognized and given awards from many different organizations such as the American Hospital Association, the American Academy of Pediatrics, the National Highway Traffic Safety Administration, the National Safety Council, the American Trauma Society, and the American Public Health Association.

== Publications ==
The following is a list of publications Barbara Barlow has contributed to during her medical career.

- "A brief history of Forging New Frontiers, the annual conference of the Injury Free Coalition for Kids."
- "Epidemiology of bone fracture across the age span in blacks and whites."
- "A comparative analysis of serious injury and illness among homeless and housed low income residents of New York City."
- "Motor vehicle injury, mortality, and hospital charges by strength of graduated driver licensing laws in 36 States."
- "Race and ethnic differences in a multicenter study of home safety with vouchers redeemable for free safety devices."
- "Motor vehicle occupant injury and related hospital expenditures in children aged 3 years to 8 years covered versus uncovered by booster seat legislation."
- "Forging new frontiers."
- "National injury-related hospitalizations in children: public versus private expenditures across preventable injury mechanisms."
- "Twenty-year trends in fatal injuries to very young children: the persistence of racial disparities."
- "Improving access to comprehensive injury risk assessment and risk factor reduction in older adult populations."
- "A national program for injury prevention in children and adolescents: the injury free coalition for kids."
- "Preventing injury and injury-related disability in children and adolescents."
- "Community childhood injury surveillance: an emergency department-based model."
- "A benefit-cost analysis of the Harlem hospital injury prevention program."
- "Impact of a cancer screening program on breast cancer stage at diagnosis in a medically underserved urban community."
