= 2026 in Laos =

- Decades: 2000s; 2010s; 2020s
- See also: Other events of 2026; List of years in Laos

Events in the year 2026 in Laos.

== Incumbents ==
- General Secretary of the Lao People's Revolutionary Party: Thongloun Sisoulith
- President: Thongloun Sisoulith
- Prime Minister: Sonexay Siphandone

== Events ==
- 3 January – A massive sinkhole emerges in the village of Thongmang in Xaythany district, Vientiane Prefecture, leaving four people missing and presumed dead.
- 16 February – Longstanding MP Valy Vetsaphong announces her withdrawal from the 2026 Laotian parliamentary election.
- 22 February – 2026 Laotian parliamentary election
- 6 March – Bokeo International Airport is officially opened.
- 19 May – Seven people are reported trapped inside a cave in Xaisomboun province following flash floods.
- 1 October – A drug smuggling case is thwarted by police at Luang Prabang International Airport involving a private jet from Malaysia planning to transport methamphetamine to the Philippines. This leads to a joint investigation by authorities in Malaysia and the Philippines after a Filipino politician is suspected to have been involved.

== Holidays ==
- 1 January – New Year's Day
- 20 January – Armed Forces Day
- 10 February – Vietnamese New Year
- 8 March – International Women's Day
- 13–16 April – Lao New Year
- 1 May – Labour Day
- 5 May – Visakha Bucha Day
- 24 July – Boun Khao Phansa
- 15 October – Boun Suang Huea
- 5 November – That Luang Festival
- 2 December – Lao National Day

== Deaths ==
- 8 August – Xaysomphone Phomvihane, 70, minister of finance (1995–1998) and president of the National Assembly (since 2021).
- 4 November – Alessandro Staccioli, 95, Italian-born Roman Catholic prelate, vicar apostolic of Luang Prabang (1968–1975).
