= Public holidays in Laos =

Public holidays in Laos are days when workers get the day off work. The Lao word for "holiday" or "festival" is boun (ບຸນ, also spelled bun).

== Public holidays ==
Date	English name	Local name	Remarks
1 January	New Year's Day	ວັນປີໃໝ່ສາກົນ	
8 March	International Women's Day	ວັນແມ່ຍິງສາກົນ	
14–16 April	Lao New Year	ບຸນປີໃໝ່ລາວ	The celebration lasts 3 days.
1 May	Labour Day	ວັນກຳມະກອນສາກົນ	
20 July	Lao Women's Union	ສະຫະພັນແມ່ຍິງລາວ	
2 December	Lao National Day	ວັນຊາດ	The establishment of the Lao People's Democratic Republic in 1975. Parades and dancing at That Luang temple.

== Lunisolar public holidays ==
Date	English name	Local name	Remarks
Late January - Early February		Boun Khoun Khao	This holiday is celebrated after the rice harvest. A ceremony takes place to give thanks to the spirits of the land and make good luck for the next harvest.
February	Chinese and Vietnamese New Year	Kud Chin and Kud Viet	Fireworks and celebrations take place at Chinese and Vietnamese temples.
February		Boun Makha Bousa	Takes place on the full moon to commemorate the speech given by the Buddha to 1,250 enlightened monks who had gathered with no organization or prior warning. In the evening, people visit the temple and circle the wat three times with candles in a ceremony known as vien tian.
Late February		Boun Khao Chi	Special offerings of sticky rice coated with eggs are made to monks. It is associated with Mahka Bousa.
Late March		Boun Pha Vet	Lasting 3 days and 3 nights, this religious festival celebrates Buddha's previous incarnation before being born as Prince Siddhartha.
Mid May	Rocket Festival	Boun Bang Fai	A festival of fertility and rainmaking. Held just before the start of the rainy season. Huge homemade rockets are fired into the air to prompt the gods to create rain for the upcoming rice-growing season. There are music, dancing, performances, and processions.
15th day of 6th lunar month (Late May)		Boun Visakha Bousa	The birth, enlightenment, and death of the Buddha. Candlelit processions take place in the evening.
Mid July		Boun Khao Phansa	At local temples, worshipers in brightly colored silks greet the dawn on Buddhist Lent by offering gifts to the monks and pouring water into the ground as a gesture of offering to their ancestors. Lent begins in July and lasts 3 months. Monks are required to stay within their wat during this time, to meditate and focus on dharma studies. Lao men are traditionally ordained as monks during this time.
Late August or early September		Haw Khao Padap Din	Paying respect to the dead.
Mid September		Boun Khao Salak	People make offerings to the monks. These include practical items such as books, pens, sugar, and coffee. Laypeople also give wax flower candles to the monks in order to gain merit.
Mid October		Boun Ork Phansa	Buddhist Lent and the rainy season both end in this holiday. Monks are liberated to perform their normal community duties. It is celebrated with boat races and carnivals. In the evening of Van Ork Phansa, a ceremony is held throughout Laos in which people launch small, candlelit banana-leaf (heua fai) floats on the rivers, decorated with offerings of incense and small amounts of money to bring luck and prosperity.
Late summer / early fall	Dragon Boat Races	Boun Song Hua	Held at different times in late summer or early fall in every riverside town. Celebrates the end of Buddhist Lent. The Vientiane Boat Race Festival (Vientiane and Savannakhet) is held the second weekend in October. The Luang Prabang Boat Races are held in early September along the Nam Kan, with a major market day preceding the races and festivities throughout the night on race day.
Full moon in early November	That Luang Festival	Boun That Louang	Pilgrimage to That Luang Stupa in Vientiane. Before dawn, thousands join in a ceremonial offering and group prayer, followed by a procession. For days afterward, a combined trade fair and carnival offers handicrafts, flowers, games, concerts, and dance shows.
Late November / early December	Hmong New Year		Not a national holiday. Celebrated among the northern hill tribe.

== See also ==
- List of festivals in Laos
- Culture of Laos#Festivals and public holidays
