= List of festivals in Laos =

Laotian Festivals are usually based on Theravada Buddhism.

== Notable festivals and public holidays ==
- Boun Bang Fay (ງານບຸນບັ້ງໄຟ)
- Boun Fai Payanak
- Boun Haw Khao Padap Din (ງານບຸນຫໍ່ເຂົ້າປະດັບດິນ)
- Boun Khao Pansa(ງານບຸນເຂົ້າພັນສາ)
- Boun Khun Khao
- Boun Makha Busaa
- Boun Ok Pansa
- Boun Suang Huea
- Boun That Luang
- Boun That Sikhot
- Boun Wat Phu Champasak
- Chinese New Year/Tết
- Hmong New Year
- International Labor Day
- Lai Heua Fai
- Lao Children's Day
- Lao Elephant Festival
- Lao Independence Day
- Lao Issara Day
- Lao New Day
- Lao Women's Day
- Pi Mai Lao
- Ok Phansa
- Pathet Lao Day
- That In Hang Festival
- Vixakha Bouxa

== See also ==
- Public holidays in Laos
