= 2025 in Laos =

- Decades: 2000s; 2010s; 2020s
- See also: Other events of 2025; List of years in Laos

Events in the year 2025 in Laos.

== Incumbents ==
- General Secretary of the Lao People's Revolutionary Party: Thongloun Sisoulith
- President: Thongloun Sisoulith
- Prime Minister: Sonexay Siphandone

== Events ==
=== January ===
- 26 January – A bus traveling from Vientiane to Pakse crashes into a tree after the driver fell asleep, killing five people and injuring 13 others.

=== May ===
- 5 May – Two soldiers are killed in an attack by unknown gunmen on a military base in Ban Phu Pha Mon, Paktha District, Bokeo Province.

=== June ===
- 4 June – US President Donald Trump issues a proclamation imposing partial restrictions on Laotian nationals travelling to the United States.
- 10 June – The European Union adds Laos to its list of high risk jurisdictions for money laundering and terrorism financing.

=== July ===
- 26 July – Artillery shells fired during the 2025 Cambodia–Thailand clashes land in Laem Pa Paek and Laem Makham Pom, causing property damage.

=== October ===
- 15 October – Two American nationals are killed in an attack by a swarm of wasps at a camp in Luang Prabang.

=== November ===
- 17 November – Princess Aiko of Japan arrives in Vientiane as part of celebrations for the 70th anniversary of diplomatic relations between Japan and Laos.

=== December ===
- 9—20 December — Laos at the 2025 SEA Games
- 15 December – Laos–South Korea relations: Laos and South Korea upgrade their bilateral relations to a comprehensive partnership.
- 16 December – US President Donald Trump issues a proclamation barring Laotian nationals from entering the United States.
- 18 December — A ferry sinks along the Mekong River near the Pak Ou Caves, killing two people and leaving another missing.

== Holidays ==
- 1 January – New Year's Day
- 20 January – Armed Forces Day
- 10 February – Vietnamese New Year
- 8 March – International Women's Day
- 13–16 April – Lao New Year
- 1 May – Labour Day
- 5 May – Visakha Bucha Day
- 24 July – Boun Khao Phansa
- 15 October – Boun Suang Huea
- 5 November – That Luang Festival
- 2 December – Lao National Day

== Deaths ==
- 2 April – Khamtai Siphandone, 101, president (1998–2006), prime minister (1991–1998), and General Secretary of the Lao People's Revolutionary Party (1992–2006).
