= 2024 in Laos =

- Decades: 2000s; 2010s; 2020s
- See also: Other events of 2024; List of years in Laos

Events in the year 2024 in Laos.

== Incumbents ==
- General Secretary of the Lao People's Revolutionary Party: Thongloun Sisoulith
- President: Thongloun Sisoulith
- Prime Minister: Sonexay Siphandone

== Events ==
=== August ===
- 12 August - A raid by authorities on the Golden Triangle Special Economic Zone results in the arrest of 771 individuals, including nationals of 15 countries, on suspicion of engaging in an online fraud network.

=== September ===
- 2 September - A boat carrying Burmese migrant workers capsizes along the Mekong River near the Golden Triangle Special Economic Zone in Bokeo Province, with several people killed and 16 others reported missing.
- 9 September - One person is killed in flooding caused by Typhoon Yagi in Luang Namtha Province.

=== October ===
- 6 - 11 October - The 44th and 45th ASEAN summits are held in Vientiane.

=== November ===
- 12 November - At least six foreign tourists die and eight others fall ill from alcohol poisoning following a visit to Vang Vieng on that date.

=== December ===
- 3 December - The Nam Ngum Reservoir officially reopens after a three-year closure where it underwent extensive renovations.
- 20 December - The government of Oudomxay province signs a concession with Ammata Lao Lanexang, providing them with 697 hectares (1,720 acres) for bamboo operations.
- 25 December - The Korea International Cooperation Agency pledges US$8.1 million to the Ministry of Agriculture and Forestry.

== Holidays ==
- 1 January – New Year's Day
- 20 January – Armed Forces Day
- 10 February – Vietnamese New Year
- 8 March – International Women's Day
- 14–16 April – Lao New Year
- 1 May – Labour Day
- 22 May – Visakha Bucha Day
- 20 July – Boun Khao Phansa
- 15 October – Boun Suang Huea
- 1 November – That Luang Festival
- 2 December – Lao National Day
