= Buddhism in Laos =

ເທວະດາ ພຸດທະສາສະນາ Theravāda Buddha Sāsana
- ທຸງຂອງພຣະພຸດທະສາສະນາ; Flag of the Buddha Sāsana

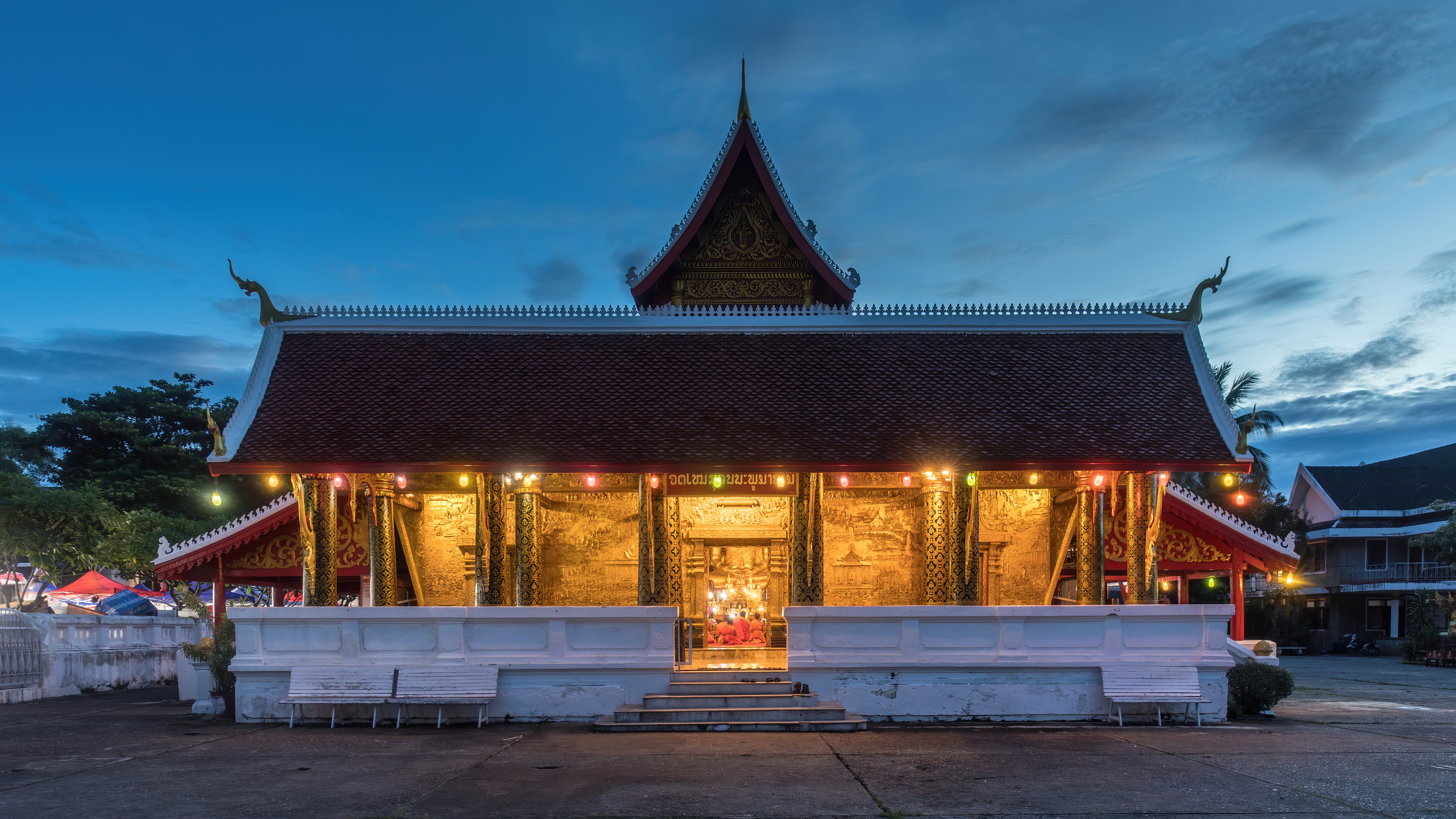
- Wat Mai Suwannaphumaham Temple in Luang Prabang, Laos

Total population
- Approximately 5.19 Million; 66% of the Laos population

Regions with significant populations
- Throughout Laos

Languages
- Lao, Pali, Khumu

Theravada Buddhism is the largest religion in Laos, which is practiced by 66% of the population. Lao Buddhism is a unique version of Theravada Buddhism and is at the basis of ethnic Lao culture. Buddhism in Laos is often closely tied to animist beliefs and belief in ancestral spirits, particularly in rural areas.

Laos is a multi-ethnic country with a large proportion of non-Buddhist groups that adhere to religions that are often subsumed under the denominator "animism", but that can also substantially overlap with Buddhism, or a least contain Buddhist elements resulting from cross-cultural contact. The percentage of the population that adheres to Buddhism in modern Laos is variously reported, the CIA World Factbook estimates 66% of the total population identify as Buddhist. Although this overall number is likely to be correct, there are large variations from province to province. Ethnic minority provinces like Sekong had only a quota of 20% of Buddhists in 2005, while provinces largely populated by ethnic Lao like Champassak reach 92% in the same year. There are also some Chinese or Vietnamese Mahayana Buddhists, primarily in urban centers.

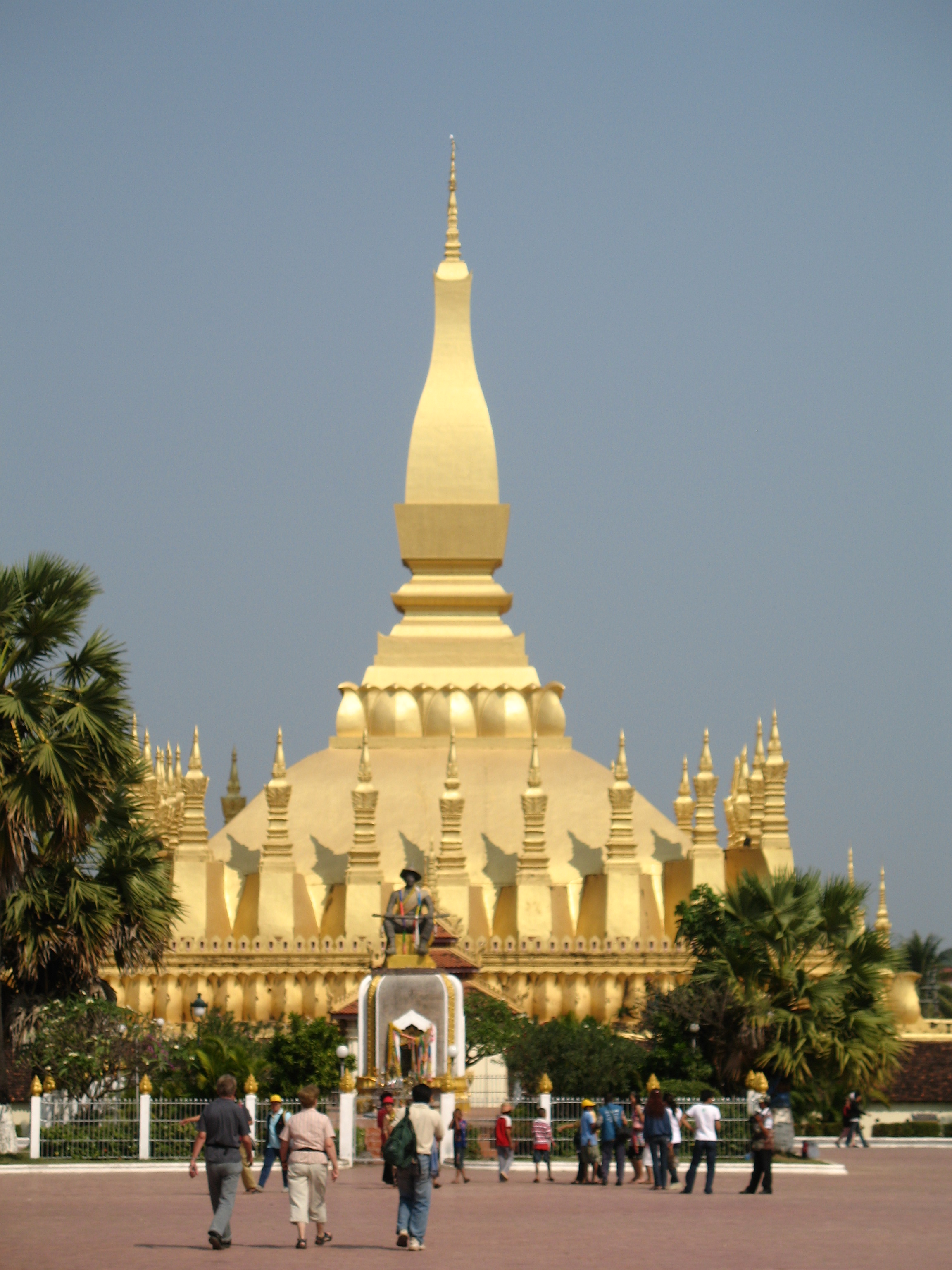
Pha That Luang stupa in Vientiane

== History ==
=== Early histories of Lao Buddhism ===
Theravada Buddhism is believed to have first reached Laos during the 7th – 8th centuries CE, via the kingdom of Dvaravati. During the 7th Century, tantric Buddhism was also introduced to Laos from the kingdom of Nan-chao, an ethnically Tai kingdom centered in modern-day Yunnan, China. The Nan-chao kingdom also likely introduced the political ideology of the king as defender and protector of Buddhism, an important ideological tie between the monarchy and the sangha in much of Southeast Asia. We also know very little about the transfer of Buddhism to the region which today is called Laos, but the current state of research suggests that Buddhism did not come in a single movement. According to Michel Lorrillard "the conditions surrounding this penetration remain very imprecise, due to the long duration of this process". From a general perspective, research on the early history of Lao Buddhism had advanced slowly, but recent studies are also signalling progress.

During the 11th & 12th Century, rulers took control of Muang Sua, the historical region of the kingdom of Luang Prabang in northern Laos. During this period, Mahayana Buddhism replaced Theravada Buddhism as the dominant religious ideology of the ruling classes. Epigraphical sources confirm that the early Lao kingdoms display the first clear signs of the Buddhicization of royal power around the middle of the fifteenth century when kings were labeled cakkavatti (Pali for king as the 'turner of the wheel of the Buddhist dharma, or Chakravarti in Sanskrit).

Historically, the Lao state is regarded as beginning in 1353 CE with the coronation of Fa Ngum at Luang Prabang. According to local historiography, Fa Ngum brought his Khmer Theravada teacher with him to act as adviser and head priest of the new kingdom. This Khmer monk named Phramaha Pasaman also brought to the kingdom a revered image of the Buddha that became known as the Phra Bang, the namesake of the city of Luang Prabang and the symbol of the Lao kingdom. However, Michel Lorrillard asserts the "complete artificial nature of this narrative" and is rather critical of the historical value of the Fa Ngum story. He instead emphasizes the influence of Buddhism from Chiang Mai. Subsequent alliances with Burma and Thailand helped cement the primacy of Theravada Buddhism in the Laotian kingdom. As attested in inscriptions, King Photisarath (1501–1547) tried to suppress the worship of spirits and further Buddhicize the population. However, the "animistic" elements of Lao Buddhism have over time survived all purification efforts and are still today of crucial importance. Local spirit cults and rituals associated with indigenous ideas of "soul substance" (khwan) are in most cases seamlessly integrated into Buddhism, and practitioners rarely see them as contradictive. Faced with rugged, isolating geography and the absence of a strong central government, Theravada Buddhism became one of the primary unifying features of Lao culture. This is also attested by the fact laws for governing the monastic order have been an important part of Buddhist statecraft in pre-modern, but also colonial Laos.

=== Lao Buddhism and Monastic Education under French Colonialism ===
The French colonial regime from early on sponsored Buddhism and its educational institutions. New curricula were set up, several monasteries were renovated and the educational system for monks was transformed so that it could serve colonial demands. During the 1920s, the administration of Buddhism in Laos was further reorganized by Prince Phetsarath and the French colonial regime. In order to subvert the dominance of Thai monastic education in the region, and use Lao and Khmer Buddhism for enhancing colonial control, the French set up institutes for the training of Buddhist monks under the auspices of EFEO. On 24 November 1914 the Ecole de Pali was founded by royal decree in Phnom Penh and renamed Ecole Supérieure de Pali in 1922. Having the aim to enhance the study of Buddhism through teaching monks "proper" Pali and Sanskrit, two Cambodian monks were in 1922 sent to EFEO Hanoi for language training.

Lao monks first went to Phnom Penh to study at the Buddhist Institute, but Lao branches were finally opened in 1931, reflecting the peripheral position of Laos in the colonial project. The French introduced new curricula based on the study of selected and appropriate texts, awarded monks with certificates and printed Buddhist books. Gregory Kourilsky and Soren Ivarsson have explored this restructuring of Buddhist education under French colonialism. They argue that the agendas behind this reorganization of Buddhism in Cambodia and Laos were similar: In order to build a national Buddhism within the context of Indochina, Siamese influence had to be curtailed. Instead of Bangkok, the Khmer and the Lao branches of the Buddhist Institute were to become centers for the higher education for monks. This sponsorship and control of Buddhism was also grounded in Buddhism's potential for anti-colonial resistance: During the early phase of French colonialism Buddhist millennial movements caused major troubles for the French regime, and parts of the Khmer sangha also opposed French influence. The influence of these colonial reforms in the field of monastic education were somewhat neutralized by the increasing political struggles during the 1950s, and finally the socialist revolution in 1975. However, during the first years of independence until 1975, signs of secularization also became visible in the domain of monastic education: While a state school system was spreading, monastic education became an increasingly specialized subfield.

=== Political Struggles and the coming of the revolution: Buddhism and the Pathet Lao ===
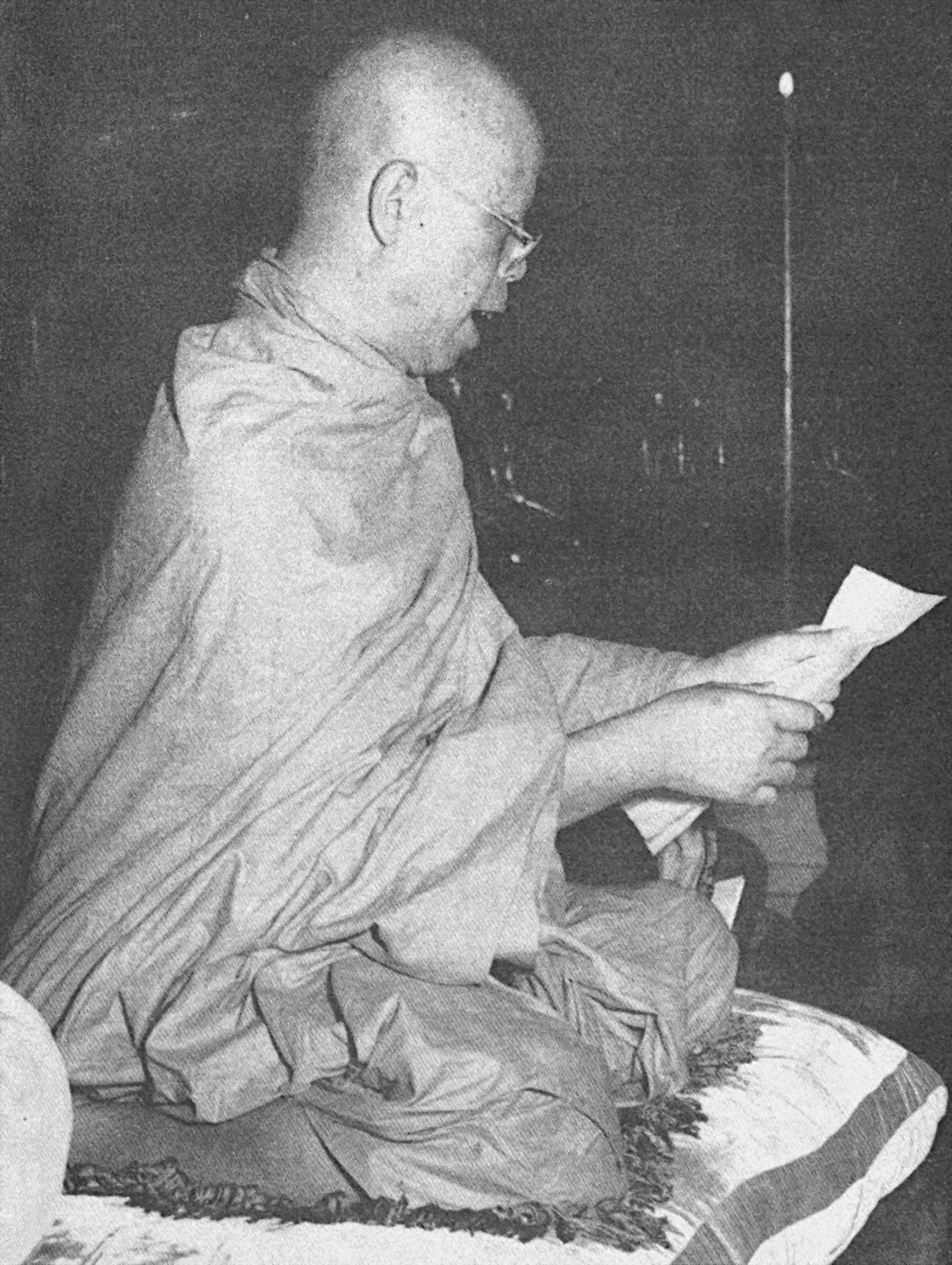
Bhaddanta Lokaratthi (Ven. Boun-Than Bouppharath Dhammañāṇo), official title Somdet Phra ฺBuddhajinros Sakalamahāsanghapāmokkha, Sangharājā of Laos reads a speech at the opening of the Laos-Cambodia session of the Buddhist Council (Chaṭṭa Sangāyanā), 1955-04-28.

The Communist treatment of religion in Laos has diverged from the experience of many other countries which have had a communist regime. Instead of repressing or banning religion outright, the Communists in Laos used the Buddhist Sangha as a vehicle to achieve political aims during the Cold War. Buddhism and monastic institutions became from the beginning of the 1950s fields where partially clandestine surveillance operations were carried out, both by Royal Lao Government forces and by more left-leaning politicians. Advocats of a middle way between socialism and capitalism such as Boun Souvannavong at the beginning gained support by prominent monks in Vientiane, but were increasingly marginalized when the political polarizations increased. Officially, Marxist theory rejects religion because it is seen as a tool used by the ruling classes to mislead the oppressed classes and to keep them subservient. Even though the Pathet Lao saw Buddhism as an antithesis of Marxism, they were able to reconcile aspects of Buddhism with Marxism. The Pathet Lao saw Buddhism and Marxism conflicting on these principles:

- Marxism rejects all forms of religion;
- Buddhism's spiritual vision of the universe conflicts with Marxism's materialistic vision;
- Buddhism regards material attachment as the cause of suffering whereas Marxism bases its utopian vision on the material world;
- Buddhism strives for harmony whereas the Marxists see a constant class struggle between different classes; and
- Buddhism eschews the use of violence while Marxism approves the use of violence where necessary.

The Pathet Lao re-interpreted Buddhism by affirming that there was no conflict between the teaching of the Gautama Buddha and revolutionary aims. They focused on the life story of the Gautama Buddha. Gautama's rejection of royal status and his choice of becoming a mendicant could be considered revolutionary as he rejected the trappings of wealth and the privilege of the ruling elite. People were not accorded status based on caste or wealth but were accepted as long as they accepted the Dhamma. The Pathet Lao claimed that Buddha had already envisioned a classless society because of his rejection of class distinction. The Pathet Lao also pointed out Buddhism had a strong dimension of social justice as the Gautama Buddha was interested in the material welfare of people and he wanted to relieve the lot of the poor. Poverty was seen as a root of evil and as a cause of crime. A minimal level of material well-being was necessary before the Dhamma could be practised. This was not too different from the Pathet Lao's aim of redistributing wealth. The Pathet Lao also pointed out both Buddhism and Marxism were interested in the ultimate happiness of people; they both aimed to help people escape from suffering; the only difference was in their method of achieving happiness. Both Buddhism and Marxism rejects the capitalist system.

According to the Pathet Lao, Buddhism and Marxism advocated different solutions because they were the evolutionary product of societies at different stages of development. Buddhism was a historical product of a pre-industrial age while Marxism was the scientific ideology of the industrial age. Buddhism was acceptable and it was useful as a tool of the revolution if it was purged of superstitious practices which had accrued over time.

==== Politicisation of the Sangha ====
The Pathet Lao's choice to co-opt Buddhism into its revolutionary struggle had a historical basis. Traditionally, the monarchy and the Sangha had a reciprocal relationship. The Sangha aimed to remain on good terms with the state. The king's right to rule was based on his submission to the Dhamma. He only ruled through the power of the Three Jewels of Buddhism: Buddha, the Dhamma and the Sangha. In return for the Sangha's support and legitimation of his rule, the king had to support the upkeep of the Sangha and promote the Dhamma in the kingdom. This was a relationship based on mutual benefits. The role of the king was to run the secular affairs of the country while the Sangha also derived its moral authority by being detached and aloof from mundane affairs.

French colonial rule resulted in the marginalization of the Sangha. It was during the Japanese occupation of French Indochina that a nascent Lao nationalist movement began to pay attention to traditional Lao culture. The nationalist movement focused on the role of Buddhism in Lao society and on the Sangha as a repository of traditional Lao values. Many young monks became involved in this resurgence of nationalism. It also meant that the traditional role of the Sangha was changing. The Sangha was no longer purely occupied with the spiritual realm; it had crossed into the secular realm. With the exile of the Lao Issara government in Thailand after the resumption of French control in 1946, the Sangha played a significant role in fanning nationalist sentiment in Laos. They also provided financial support by using Buddhist festivals as fundraisers. In 1950, the Lao Issara movement split into two factions. The moderate faction supported independence within the French Union while the radical faction supported the armed struggle of the Viet Minh. Some monks actually joined the Pathet Lao, while other monks used Buddhist teachings to bolster the liberation struggle. This was effective because of the great moral impact of the Sangha on Lao society. As a result, both the government in Vientiane and the Pathet Lao sought to use the Sangha as a vehicle for their political aims.

In the First Coalition government of 1957, the Pathet Lao held religious affairs as one of their two portfolios. The Minister for Religious Affairs, Phoumi Vongvichit was a communist and there was a tactical reason for the Pathet Lao to take this portfolio. The Ministry of Religious Affairs supervised the Sangha directly, a function it inherited from its colonial predecessor. Information and instructions could be transmitted via the Sangha ranks without recourse to the civil administration. This meant that the communists were now in control of a communication network which fanned out from Vientiane to the most inaccessible villages. The ministry funds were also used to pay for monastic meetings where pro-communist ideas could be promulgated. This technique was so effective that even though the Coalition government collapsed in a matter of months, many monks had already been won to the side of the Pathet Lao. Communist propaganda was also incorporated into Buddhism sermons: the right wing forces were equated with evil and the Communists were seen as the forces of good.

==== Rightist Attempt to Co-Opt the Sangha ====
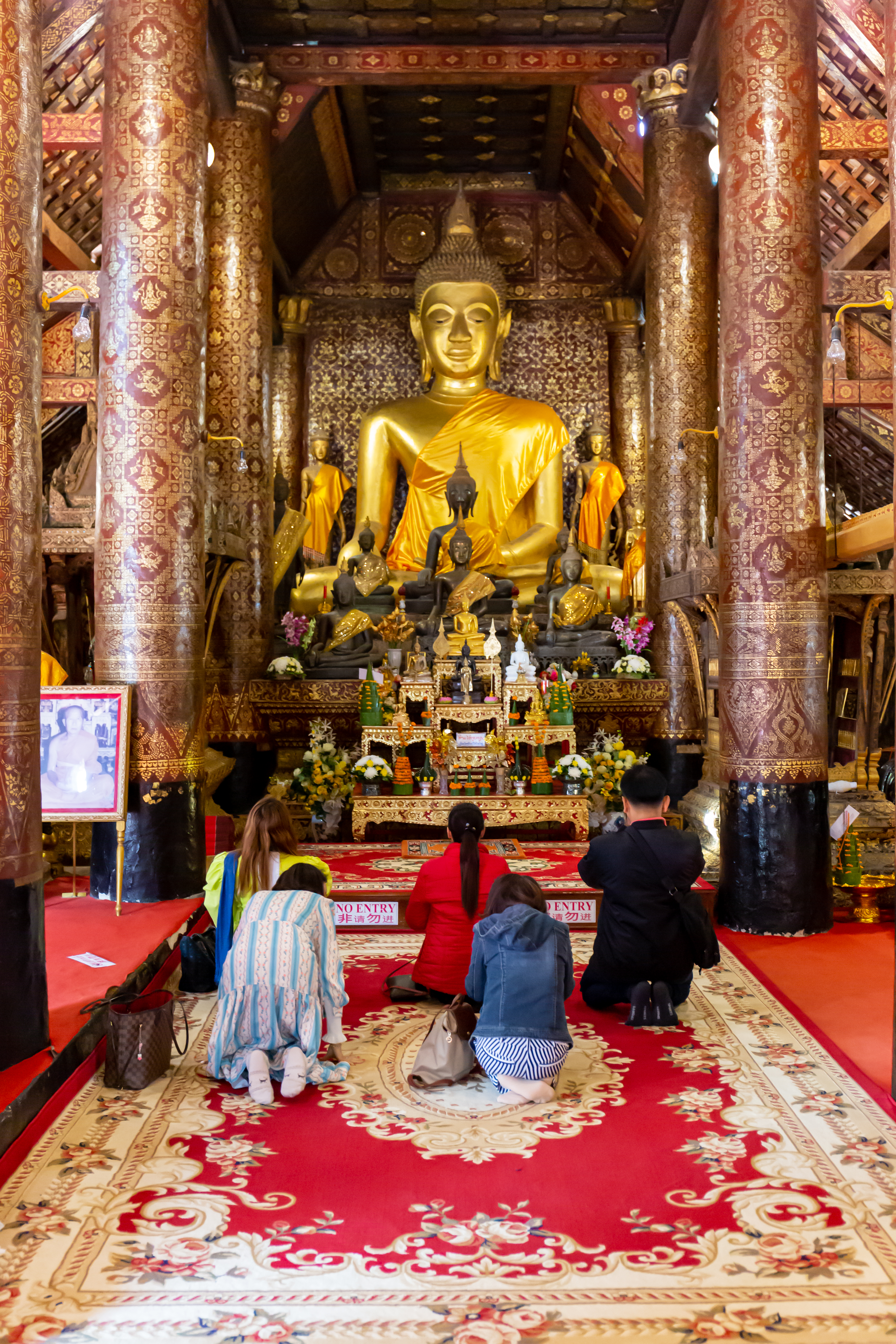
Wat Xieng Thong temple in Luang Prabang, Laos

The success of the Pathet Lao in using the Sangha for their political aims goaded the government in Vientiane and their American supporters into action by trying to bring the Sangha firmly under their control. The rightist government of Phoui Sananikone, which took power after the failure of the First Coalition government, tried to control the Sangha by passing legislation in the form of Royal Ordinance number 160 on 25 May 1959. It defined government control of the internal affairs of the Sangha. Government officials could veto elections of abbots and elders and candidates for higher positions in the Sangha required Cabinet consent. Correspondence between the various administrative divisions of the Sangha had to go via the civil administration. This was an attempt to turn the Sangha into another branch of the executive. This resulted in tension between the Sangha and the government and led to unrest in the Sangha. This proved to be opportune for the Pathet Lao who were quick to exploit these tensions to their own interests. The Americans trained some of the monks, who were then expected to speak against the Communists. Lao-speaking monks from Thailand were also sent to Laos to join the ideological battle against the Communists. These monks were from the Thammanyut-nikay sect, a reform sect which had been founded in Thailand. The Thammanyut-nikay sect was a minority sect in Laos, as opposed to the majority Maha-nikay sect. The immediate consequences of all these actions led to further tensions between the government and the Sangha. This was quickly exploited by the Pathet Lao. Two underground movements, with Pathet Lao support was founded to fight against American and government influence in the affairs of the Sangha. They were the "Movement of Young Monks against the Thai Thammanyut monks" and the "Movement of Novices to Demand their Rights".

In addition, many members of the Sangha were already pre-disposed to anti-government propaganda of the Communists due to the "inverse class structure" of the Sangha. Under the French administration, the Lao elite was educated in secular schools. The poor could only be educated in the monasteries. Jobs in the government were offered to the French-educated elite; those who were educated in monasteries were denied jobs in the government on the grounds that their religious education was irrelevant for government jobs. Many of those students who were educated in the monasteries had to remain as monks and they harboured grudges against the government. This was aggravated by the fact that many members of the Sangha, especially those in rural areas only received a rudimentary education and were ill-disciplined. They only had a flimsy knowledge of the Dhamma and were susceptible to Marxist manipulations of Buddhism.

==== Sangha as an organ of propaganda ====
During the Lao Civil War, the Pathet Lao actively used members of the Sangha in their propaganda campaign. For example, a seized Pathet Lao document dated 14 January 1968 reports how the Pathet Lao had sent out thirty-three monks "to preach revolutionary ethics….to protect Buddhism, to revive the real morality, to explain the revolutionary tasks to the people, and to resist the psychological warfare of the American imperialists and their reactionary lackeys". According to the Pathet Lao, members of the Sangha could be transformed into revolutionaries. This is because the monk has renounced material possessions and is no longer motivated by selfish personal interests. The monk was seeking the betterment of humanity. As such, the monk could not stand idly by and allow the oppression of the common people. To allow such injustice was a betrayal of Buddhism. The Pathet Lao also officially accepted Buddhism in the zones under their control.

With the proclamation of the Lao People's Democratic Republic on 2 December 1975, the Pathet Lao needed to establish their legitimacy to rule, especially in zones that used to be controlled by the rightists. They actively promoted an eighteen-point political programme with the slogan "Laos: Peaceful, Independent, Neutral, Democratic, United and Prosperous". The liberal democratic tone of the document appealed to most people. These included unity and equality of all Lao nationals of all ethnic groups, free elections, freedom of speech and the right to free enterprise and property ownership. The fifth point included a call to respect and protect all religions, especially Buddhism. Naturally, the Sangha supported these eighteen points. They recruited as many monks as possible to preach these eighteen points in the rural areas. The Pathet Lao message benefited from the goodwill felt by the people towards the Sangha as this message was promoted via the monks. The monks were accompanied by armed Pathet Lao cadres on their preaching tours, supposedly for their protection. Their sermons were also tape-recorded to ensure that they kept to the official party line. Monks who did not support the eighteen point political programme were criticised.

The Sangharaja or the Supreme Patriarch of Buddhism in Laos also urged the monks to work with the revolutionaries for the good of the nation. A booklet entitled "Action Plan for the Lao Sangha" was prepared. It noted the importance of the Sangha and emphasised the importance of the Sangha as mediators in Lao society. This indicated how the Pathet Lao intended to use the ecclesiastical weight of the Sangha to settle disputes they may face in their transition to power. Monks were to serve as a channel of communication between the Party and the people.

=== The Sangha under Communist Rule – 1975 to 1979 ===
==== Communist interpretation of Buddhism ====
Monks were the first to attend Pathet Lao political seminars. At first, they attended voluntarily but as these seminars became protracted re-education classes, monks had to be forced to attend. In these seminars, the monks were taught the Pathet Lao interpretation of Buddhism. Monks were taught Marxism-Leninism in Buddhist institutes. Both Marxism and Buddhism taught the equality of all men. The Sangha, as a community of men who lived and worked together without individual ownership of property, was similar to a Marxist collective. Both Marxism and Buddhism at an abstract level, aimed to liberate mankind from suffering and to attain happiness. The Pathet Lao tried to purge Buddhism of such superstition as belief in the existence of demons, or of life after death in one of the Buddhist heavens or hells. The accumulation of merit was downplayed; and karma was denounced as leading to fatalism and pacifism.

While proclaiming that Buddhism and Marxism was compatible, the Pathet Lao also sought actively to replace the Dhamma with Marxism-Leninism. They also sought to discourage merit making, as it was seen as a diversion of scarce resources. To the Pathet Lao, religion still conflicted with the formation of an orthodox Marxist-Leninist state. Ironically, the Pathet Lao's attack on the popular aspects of Lao Buddhist practice such as spirit worship and use of special amulets may have actually led to an increased orthodoxy in Lao Buddhism as it is reverting closer to Buddha's original teachings. Thai followers of Buddhadasa are of the opinion that Lao Buddhism has freed itself from false beliefs and local accretions. They point out that spirit worship and the blessing of amulets, which were not part of Buddha's teachings, have been prohibited.

==== Lao United Buddhists Association ====
Laotian Buddhist flag

More importantly, the Sangha remained as an alternative route to social advancement outside the Lao People's Revolutionary Party or LPRP, the political wing of the Pathet Lao. The Pathet Lao sought to make the Sangha an instrument of party policy. It was also important to control the Sangha as it was one of the few organisations that had penetrated every village in Laos. The sectarian divisions between Maha-nikay and Thammayut-nikay was abolished and the Sangha was restructured as the Lao United Buddhists Association. This association was placed under the auspices of the Department of Religious Affairs in the Ministry of Education. The traditional Sangha hierarchy, including the Sangharaja was abolished and their elaborate fans which were the symbols of their ranks, were smashed. Executive positions in the Lao United Buddhists Association were filled by Party appointees. All high ranking monks had to attend month long political indoctrination classes. Theravada monks have to attend a fortnightly recitation of the Pāṭimokkha or the 227 verses of monastic discipline in Pali. This became transformed as a forum to criticise monks who had strayed from the Party line. Monks began to leave the Sangha or flee to Thailand.

==== Attacks mounted against Buddhism ====
At the beginning of 1976, a number of attacks were mounted against Buddhism. The teaching of religion and Buddhist morality was prohibited in primary schools. Buddhist monks were harassed by local cadres. These attacks did not last as it led to great public opposition. The Pathet Lao also realised that they still needed the monks for their propaganda objectives. By the end of 1976, these pressures on the Sangha ceased. These pressures also ceased at the same time that the Pathet Lao completed the reorganisation of the Sangha. Monks are still invited to attend all secular state occasions, such as National Day. Official government delegations have attended major Buddhist festivals such as the That Luang Festival. (Trankell 2000, p. 198). Although monks are not harassed, they have to use their sermons to encourage the people to support the Party and its policies. This also had the effect of reducing the prestige of the Sangha in the eyes of the laity. Traditionally, the independence of the Sangha acted as the foundation of its moral authority; it was aloof and detached from mundane affairs. By using the monks as a vehicle of political indoctrination, the moral authority of the Sangha was weakened.

Refugee Lao monks and anti-communist informants have reported that the situation in Laos was much more serious. Pressure against the Sangha increased between 1976 and 1979. One monk who left Vientiane in December 1976 said that pressure was only subtle and indirect. Monks who did not toe the party line were disciplined by the Sangha and monks were sent on re-education courses but none had been executed. By 1979, 1000 monks were reported to have been confined to re-education camps. Another monk who fled Southern Laos in May 1978 reported more heavy-handed methods. There were unverified reports that monks had been arrested and shot. In March 1979, the eighty-seven-year-old Sangharaja of Laos, Venerable Thammayano, fled to Thailand by floating across the Mekong on a raft of inflated car inner tubes. He had been confined to his monastery and was not allowed to preach (Zago 1978). He stated that youths were dissuaded from joining the Sangha and that monastic teachings had to adhere to government guidelines. There was a serious decrease in the number of monks in the Lao Sangha during this period. Some monks left the Sangha, many fled and some were sent to labour camps. Young novices were persuaded by the government to leave the Sangha with offers of secular training and education and special vocational schools were set up for them. This was not aided by the loss of prestige of the Lao Sangha, which was being seen as a tool of government policy. The significant number of monks who had escaped to Thailand and monks who aided the anti-communist insurgents demonstrates that the regime's attempt to co-opt the Sangha was not completely successful.

=== The Situation of Buddhism after 1979 ===
The official attitudes towards Buddhism began to liberalise, in tandem with economic liberalization in the late 1980s. The Buddhist Sangha has expanded their traditional roles. Previously, they focused on teaching Buddhism but they also assist in adult literacy programs after the formation of the Lao People's Democratic Republic. They teach the Lao language and other subjects in places where schools are not available or where teachers are not available. They play a prominent role in education, especially early education. They continue their role as traditional healers in a country where doctors are scarce. However, they are prohibited from issuing cures of a spiritualist nature. They can dispense traditional herbal cures and Western medicines. In this sense, the Buddhist Sangha have had to re-invent themselves by emphasising their utilitarian roles in Lao society. The Sangha has become seen as a preserver of national culture, especially in the maintenance of wats and monasteries. Buddhism has survived because it remains central to the cultural identity of Laos, and Buddhism is inextricably interwoven with Lao culture.

=== Contemporary Lao Buddhism and the Current Situation ===
By the early 1990s, Buddhism was on the resurgence. The wat still remained as an important focus of social life. Lines of monks could accept morning offerings from the faithful without interference and attendance at Buddhist ceremonies increased again. At the annual Pha That Luang Festival, most members of the Politburo could be seen making offerings to monks. (Trenkell 2000, p. 198). Now party officials also engage more visibly in the worship of the relics enshrined in this monument and thereby reaffirm the relationship between Buddhism and the state – a long-standing feature of Buddhism, its cosmology and the political sphere. Moreover, in 2003 and 2010 the Ministry of Information and Culture inaugurated statues of King Fa Ngum and King Anouvong. The rituals surrounding the worship of relics and statues have become displays of the patronage power of the Lao government that thereby is intending to connect itself to a glorious Buddhist past in order to increase its legitimacy in the present. However, many state rituals have also been carefully re-engineered since 1975.

While government policy towards religion has liberalized, the Sangha remains under Party control and monks have to study official government policy. Since the 1990s, the Sangha has been re-oriented as a primarily religious organisation. With Buddhist institutions being still firmly integrated into the Party State, Buddhism and the language, moral values and lifestyles associated with it, are now again promoted as "national culture". Vatthana Pholsena describes this as "a secularized image of Buddhism in order to reconcile the official ideology and the religion." A process of the Buddhification of the political sphere, but also everyday culture and is observable, at least in regions with a high proportion of ethnic Lao. Although the ethnic and religious conversion of animist ethnic minorities has been a long-standing feature of the region, it seems that the increasing reach of the nation-state accelerates this process. 'Laotification' and 'Buddhification' very often go hand-in-hand, at least in some southern regions of Laos where Mon-Khmer minorities and ethnic Lao live in close proximity to each other. Like in the past, Buddhism offers social upward mobility to poorer segments of society and ethnic minorities.

Buddhist institutes for the training of monks like Champasak Sangha College have been devoting more time to the teaching of religious disciplines such as the foundation of the Dhamma, the disciplinary code, Pali, the life of the Buddha and the Buddhist canon. Monks appear to give talks on television and radio and they are allowed to give talks in schools and have access to patients in hospitals. Lately, a kind of socially engaged Buddhism has also developed in Laos. Monks are now actively involved in HIV-and drug-prevention programs and expand into other areas that mix social work, environmental protection and education. The UNESCO world heritage status of Luang Prabang has also led to more global engagements of its Buddhist institutions: The highest ranking monk of Luang Prabang Maha Khamchan Virachitto (1920–2007) kept his transnational networks even during the time of socialism active, and has had a major impact on the resurgence of Buddhism in Laos. The large collection of photos he left after his death, and those of other laypeople and monks taken over the last hundred years, are now being transformed into an archive that will be of great value for documenting the past of the religious culture of the city.

== Buddhism in Laotian Culture ==
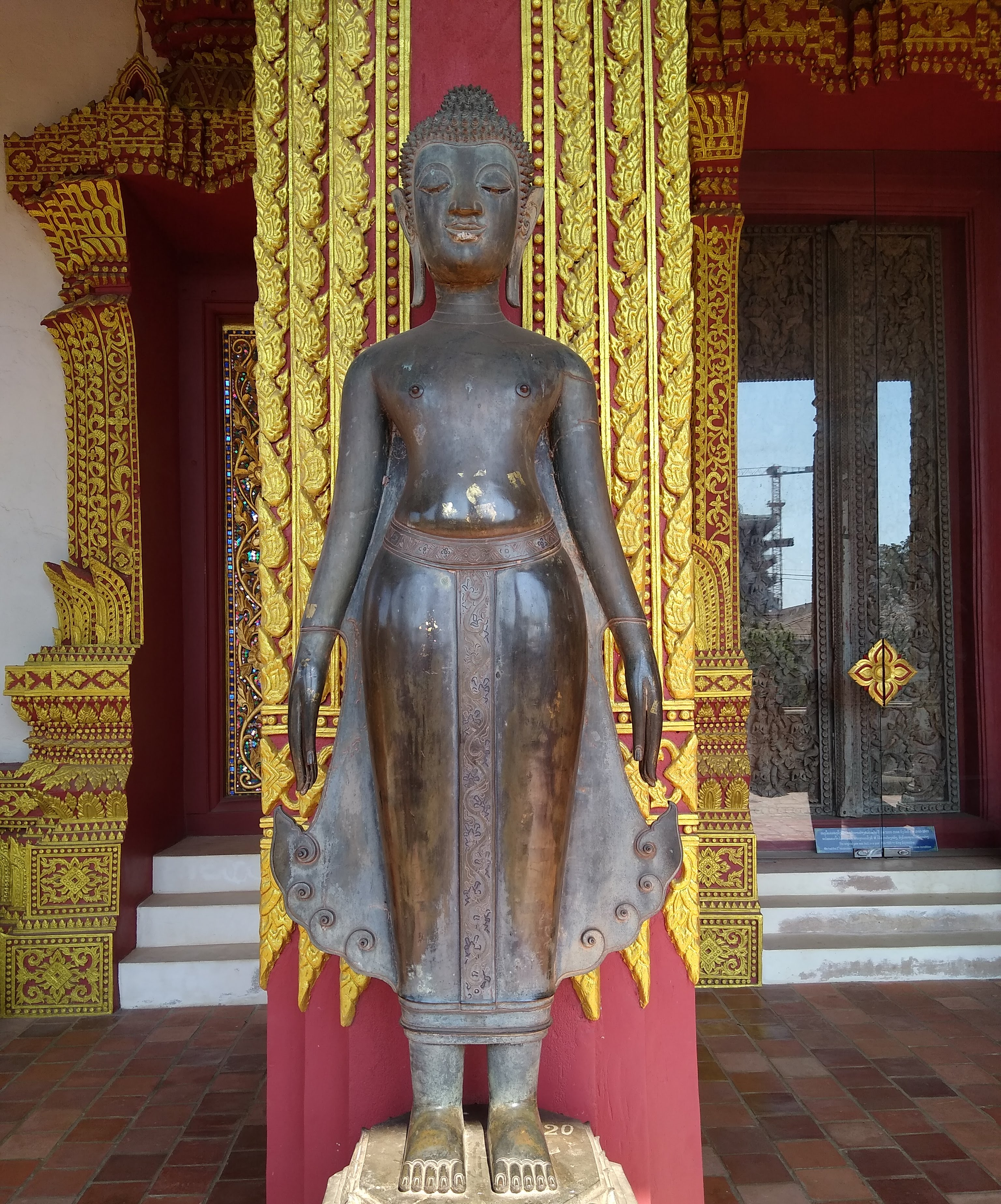
An 18th-century Buddha statue in the "calling for rain" posture at Haw Phra Kaew

Laotian Buddhists are very devout, and in the past almost every Laotian man joined a monastery, or temple, for at least a short period of time. Some men eventually become monks for the rest of their lives. Due to the demands of modern life, this practice is currently undergoing changes. Most people donate food to the monks as an act of generosity to gain merit and accumulate positive karma. The temples of Laos were once seen as "Universities" for monks. Buddhist monks are highly respected and revered in Laotian communities. Based on traditional beliefs, the women were taught that they can only attain Nibbāna or fully enlightenment after they have been reborn as men.

=== Art and Architecture ===
The Pha That Luang, Wat Sisakhet, Wat Xieng Thong, and That Dam are all Buddhist structures in Laos. Lao Buddhism is also famous for images of the Buddha performing uniquely Lao mudras, or gestures, such as calling for rain, and striking uniquely Lao poses such as showing the Buddha lying down and welcoming death, after which he would achieve Nirvana. During the colonial era, Henri Parmentier undertook a massive survey of Lao arts and architecture that remains of crucial value for the general documentation of this field before the destruction that took place in the 1960s and 1970s (Parmentier 1988).

=== Literature ===
In the Pra Lak Pra Lam, the Lao Ramayana, instead of having Rama portrayed as an incarnation of Vishnu, Rama is an incarnation of the Buddha. Lao people have also written many versions of the Jataka Tales. See the study by Sahai (1973) and Ladwig (2016) for more specific accounts of these narratives and their associated rituals, and especially Peltier (1987) for an excellent overview of the rich literary tradition of Laos. Louis Finot's extensive overview of Lao Buddhist manuscripts is somewhat dated, but remains one of the most in-depth studies ever undertaken on this subject.

== Bibliography ==
- Baird, Ian G. (August 2012). "Lao Buddhist Monks' Involvement in Political and Military Resistance to the Lao People's Democratic Republic Government since 1975". The Journal of Asian Studies. 71 (3): 655–677. doi:10.1017/S0021911812000642. S2CID 154222249.
- Baird, Ian G. (2013). "Millenarian movements in southern Laos and North Eastern Siam (Thailand) at the turn of the twentieth century: Reconsidering the involvement of the Champassak Royal House". South East Asia Research. 21 (2): 257–279. doi:10.5367/sear.2013.0147. ISSN 0967-828X. JSTOR 23752551. S2CID 147417749.
- Boulyaphonh, Khamvone (2014). "International Connections of Lao Buddhism as Reflected in Personal Letters Found at Pha Khamchan Virachitta Maha Thela's Abode (Kuti) in Vat Saen Sukharam, Luang Prabang". DORISEAS Working Paper.
- Brown, MacAlister; Zasloff, Joseph Jermiah (1986). Apprentice Revolutionaries: The Communist Movement in Laos, 1930-1985. Stanford: Hoover Institution Press. ISBN 978-0-8179-8122-8.
- Evans, Grant (1998). The Politics of Ritual and Remembrance: Laos Since 1975. Honolulu: University of Hawaii Press. ISBN 978-0-8248-2054-1.
- Finot, Louis (1917). "Recherches sur la littérature laotienne". Bulletin de l'École Française d'Extrême-Orient. 17 (5): 1–219. doi:10.3406/befeo.1917.5323. hdl:2027/mdp.39015040557293.
- Grabowsky, V. (2007). "Buddhism, Power and Political Order in Laos". In Harris, I. (ed.). Buddhism, Power and Political Order. Abingdon: Routledge. pp. 121–142.
- Holt, John (2009). Spirits of the place : Buddhism and Lao religious culture. Honolulu: University of Hawai'i Press. ISBN 978-0-8248-3327-5.
- Ivarsson, Søren (2008). Creating Laos: The Making of a Lao Space Between Indochina and Siam, 1860-1945. Copenhagen: NIAS Press. ISBN 978-87-7694-023-2.
- Kourilsky, Gregory (2006). Recherches sur l'institute bouddique au Laos (1930–1949). Les circonstances de sa création, son action, son échec (Masters). Paris: EPHE.
- Ladwig, Patrice (2006). Applying the Dhamma to contemporary society: Socially engaged Buddhism and development work in Lao PDR, Juth Pakai – UNDP Development Journal 7, 16–27
- Ladwig, Patrice (2008). "Between cultural preservation and this-worldly commitment: Modernization, social activism and the Lao Buddhist sangha". In Goudineau, Yves; Michel Lorillard (eds.). Nouvelles recherches sur le Laos. Paris: EFEO.
- Ladwig, Patrice (2009). "Prediger der Revolution: Der buddhistische Klerus und seine Verbindungen zur Kommunistischen Bewegung in Laos (1957–1975)". In Mählert, Ulrich (ed.). Jahrbuch für Historische Kommunismus-forschung. Berlin: Aufbau. pp. 181–197. ISBN 978-3-351-02689-9.
- Ladwig, Patrice (2011). "The Genesis and Demarcation of the Religious Field: Monasteries, State Schools, and the Secular Sphere in Lao Buddhism (1893-1975)". Sojourn: Journal of Social Issues in Southeast Asia. 26 (2): 196–223. doi:10.1355/sj26-2c. ISSN 0217-9520. JSTOR 41308375. S2CID 145597864.
- Ladwig, Patrice (3 April 2014). "Millennialism, Charisma and Utopia: Revolutionary Potentialities in Pre-modern Lao and Thai Theravāda Buddhism". Politics, Religion & Ideology. 15 (2): 308–329. doi:10.1080/21567689.2014.899067. S2CID 145712928.
- Ladwig, Patrice (November 2015). "Worshipping Relics and Animating Statues. Transformations of Buddhist statecraft in contemporary Laos" (PDF). Modern Asian Studies. 49 (6): 1875–1902. doi:10.1017/S0026749X13000486. S2CID 145208558.
- Ladwig, Patrice (2016). Emotions and narrative: Excessive giving and ethical ambivalence in the Lao Vessantara-Jātaka. In Collins, Steven (ed.). Readings of the Vessantara Jātaka. New York: Columbia University Press, pp. 53–80
- Lafont, P-B. (1982). "Buddhism in Contemporary Laos". In Stuart-Fox, M. (ed.). Contemporary Laos: Studies in the Politics and Society of the Lao People's Democratic Republic. St Lucia: University of Queensland Press. pp. 148–162.
- Lorrillard, Michel (2006). "Insights on the Diffusion of Lao Buddhism". In Lagirarde, François (ed.). Buddhist Legacies in Mainland Southeast Asia. Études thématiques. Vol. 19. Paris: EFEO.
- Lorrillard, Michel (2008). Pour une géographie historique du bouddhisme au Laos. in Goudineau, Yves & Michel Lorrillard (eds.). Recherches nouvelles sur le Laos. Bangkok: EFEO.
- McDaniel, Justin (2008). Gathering leaves and lifting words: histories of Buddhist Monastic education in Laos and Thailand. University of Washington Press. ISBN 978-0-295-98849-8.
- Moppert, François (1978). Mouvement de résistance au pouvoir colonial français de la minorité proto indochinoise du plateau des Bolovens au Sud-Laos 1901–1931 (PhD). Université de Paris VII.
- Morev, Lev (March 1998). "Religion, state and society in contemporary Laos 1". Religion, State and Society. 26 (1): 31–38. doi:10.1080/09637499808431803.
- Morev, Lev (December 2002). "Religion in Laos Today". Religion, State and Society. 30 (4): 395–407. doi:10.1080/09637490220127602. S2CID 144185396.
- Parmentier, Henry (1988). L'art du Laos (2 vol.). Paris: EFEO.
- Peltier, Anatole (1988). Le roman classique Lao. Paris: EFEO.
- Pholsena, Vatthana (2006). Post-war Laos: The Politics of Culture, History and Identity. Institute of Southeast Asian Studies. ISBN 978-981-230-356-1.
- Sahai, Sachchidanand (1973). The Ramayana in Laos: a study in the Gvay Dvorahbi. Delhi: D.K. Publishers.
- Sengsoulin, Bounleuth (2014). "The Lao Sangha of Luang Prabang and its Social Role in the Post-1975 Period". DORISEA Working Paper.
- Stuart-Fox, Martin (1996). Buddhist Kingdom, Marxist State: The Making of Modern Laos. White Lotus. ISBN 978-974-8496-48-1.
- Taillard, Christian (1974). "Essai sur la bi-polarisation autour du vat et de l'école des villages Lao de la plaine de Vientiane: Le bouddhisme populaire confronte au développement économique". Asie du Sud-est et Monde Insulindien. 5 (3): 91–104.
- Trankell, I-B. (2000). Royal Relics: Ritual & Social Memory in Louang Prabang in Evans, G. (ed) Laos: Culture and Society (pp. 191–213) Singapore: Institute of Southeast Asian Studies
- Zago, Marcel (1978). Un bonze accuse. Pôles et Tropiques Vol. 4/1, pp. 132–143.
