= 2023 in Laos =

- Decades: 2000s; 2010s; 2020s
- See also: Other events of 2023; List of years in Laos

Events in the year 2023 in Laos.

== Incumbents ==
Photo	Post	Name
	General Secretary of the Lao People's Revolutionary Party	Thongloun Sisoulith
	President of Laos	Thongloun Sisoulith
133px133px	Prime Minister of Laos	Sonexay Siphandone

== Events ==
Ongoing — COVID-19 pandemic in Laos

- 8 February – Inflation in Laos reaches 40.3%, the highest since 2000.

== Sports ==
- 5 – 17 May: Laos will participate in the 2023 Southeast Asian Games.
