= 2026 Laos private jet drug smuggling case =

- Learjet 55 (N73GP) at the Juan Santamaría International Airport in Costa Rica in 2012, the exact aircraft linked to the 2026 Laos drug smuggling case.
- Date: October 1, 2026 (interception)
- Venue: Luang Prabang International Airport
- Location: Luang Prabang, Laos; 19°54′06.6″N 102°10′04.6″E
- Type: Drug smuggling attempt
- Motive: Delivery of methamphetamine to Manila, Philippines
- Perpetrator: Under investigation
- Arrests: 13 (Luang Prabang), 4 (Malaysia)

On October 1, 2026, Laotian police intercepted a suspected drug-smuggling operation at Luang Prabang International Airport in Luang Prabang, Laos involving a private jet from Malaysia. The shipment was reportedly bound for Manila, Philippines. Malaysian and Philippine authorities are jointly investigating the case.

Former Bangsamoro Parliament member Edrieza Rimbang was accused of financing the operation, an allegation he denied.

== Background ==
=== Illegal drug trade ===
Methamphetamine forms a significant part of the illicit drug industry in Southeast Asia either in crystallised or pill form with Myanmar being the primary producer of the drug in the region. Laos is both a transit point and a noted producer of precursor chemicals for methamphetamine.

Transport of the drug from Golden Triangle in mainland Southeast Asia to the Philippines is often conducted via the sea. Shipment via airplanes are rare.

Drug trafficking is punishable by death in Laos.

=== Smuggling attempt and intervention ===
The provincial police of Luang Prabang received a tip on September 21, 2026 that a group is planning to smuggle narcotics via a private aircraft reportedly flying directly from the Sultan Abdul Aziz Shah Airport in Selangor, Malaysia to the Luang Prabang International Airport. Authorities subsequently learned that the aircraft's scheduled arrival had been postponed to October 1. The drugs were learned to be destined for Manila in the Philippines.

Police monitoring the airport observed two vehicles stop outside the terminal, after which airport personnel unloaded 23 suitcases from the vehicles, screened them using an X-ray machine, and transferred them onto the aircraft. The vehicles departed once the luggage had been loaded. Police subsequently examined the suitcases and found blue bags marked with a golden fish symbol. Methamphetamine was discovered in 21 of the 23 suitcases.

Police detained 13 people for questioning in connection with the incident, including the aircraft's pilot and co-pilot, a foreign tourist, three employees of a company, and seven employees of the airport. The aircraft, which was seized was a Learjet 55 with tail code N73GP.

Separately on October 7, the owner of private aviation company linked to the case and three other individuals were arrested by Malaysian authorities in the Selangor airport for questioning and was released after giving statements.

=== Drugs involved ===
The perpetrators attempted to ship 521 kilograms (1,149 lb) of methamphetamine which is colloquially known as syabu in Malaysia and shabu in the Philippines. Philippine authorities estimate that the drugs worth around ₱3.5 billion peso (over US$55.4 million).

== Aftermath ==
=== Investigation ===
The Royal Malaysia Police and the Philippine Drug Enforcement Agency are conducting a joint investigation on the Laos drug smuggling case. The joint probe claimed that they were uncover a major drug syndicate with links to a Filipino politician.

=== Suspects ===
Philippine authorities identified eleven "persons of interests" in relation to the Laos drug smuggling case. This include one individual already arrested in Laos and a former member of the Bangsamoro Parliament, Edrieza Rimbang noted to be an ally of President Rodrigo Duterte. Interior Secretary Jonvic Remulla alleged Rimbang is the financier of the whole operation, though added that there is no evidence linking the Duterte family to the case. Rimbang denied involvement, rejecting the allegations and arguing that his defeat in the 2026 regional parliamentary election reflected his lack of funds to mount a successful campaign.

According to the Philippine investigation, the pilots refused to load the luggage leading to the cancellation of the flight of the plane to the Philippines. A Filipino national allegedly financed the charter plane. The Philippines stated its intention to appeal to the Laotian government to commute any possible death sentence imposed on its nationals detained in Laos.
