= Boun Khun Khao =

Festival in Laos

Boun Khun Khao is an agricultural festival held in rural parts of Laos at the end of January and beginning of February. The festival celebrates the new harvest. Rice farmers often store the unhusked rice in local temples as part of the celebrations.
