= Lao National Day =

Public holiday on December 2

National Day
- Observed by: Laos
- Type: National holiday
- Significance: Anniversary of the establishment of the Lao PDR
- Celebrations: Parades and dancing at That Luang temple
- Date: 2 December
- Frequency: Annual

Lao National Day (Lao: ວັນຊາດ) is a public holiday in Laos held on December 2 to mark the end of the monarchy and the establishment of the Lao People's Democratic Republic in 1975.

Celebrations often include flying the flags of Laos and the Lao People's Revolutionary Party, military parades, and speeches by government officials.
