= Pha That Luang =

Buddhist stupa in Vientiane, Laos

- Lao: ທາດຫຼວງ or ພຣະທາດຫລວງ
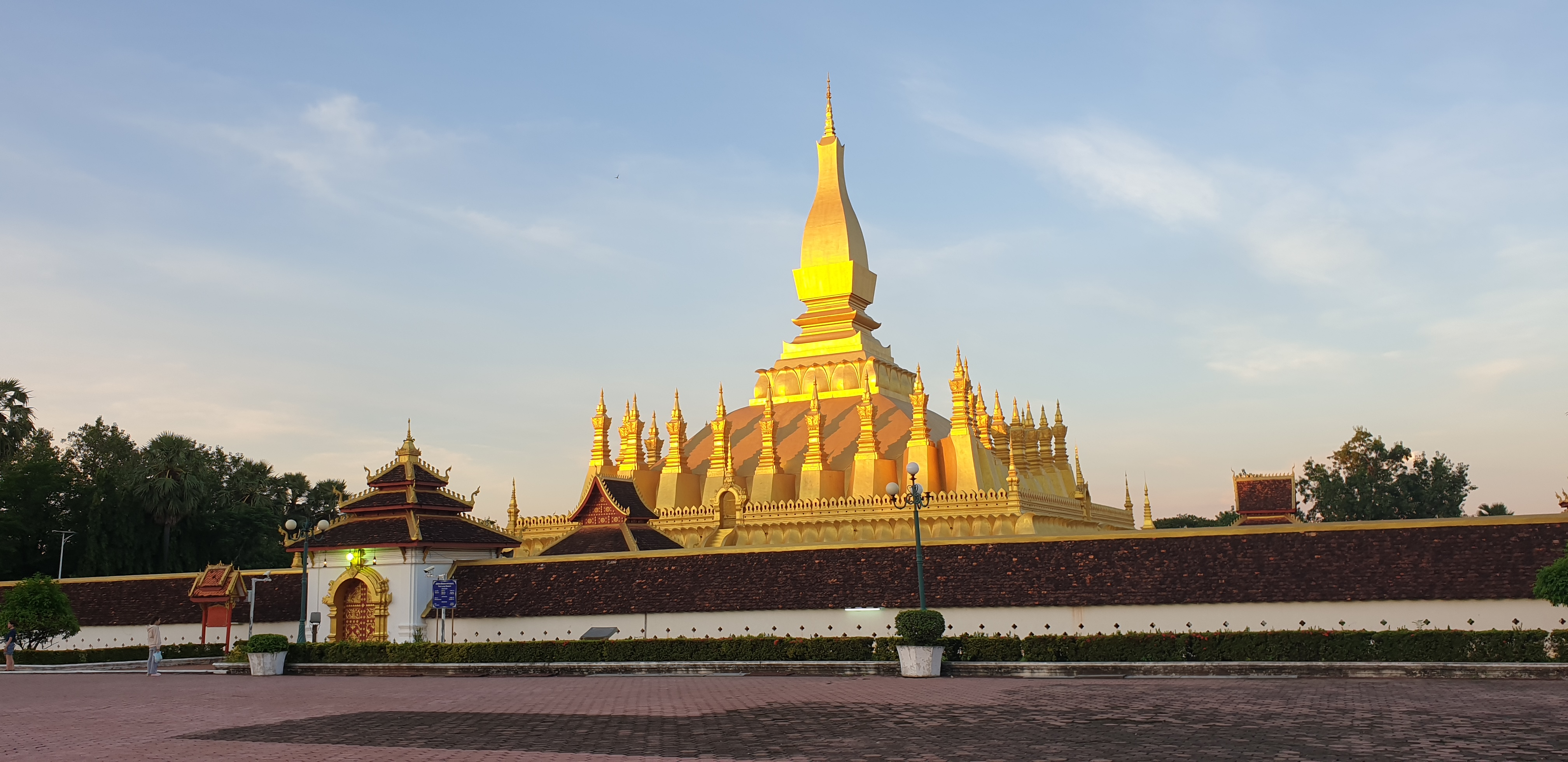
- Pha That Luang

- Location within Laos

Religion
- Affiliation: Buddhism

Location
- Location: Vientiane
- Country: Laos
- Coordinates: 17°58′34.20″N 102°38′03.30″E

Map

Pha That Luang (Lao: ທາດຫຼວງ or ພຣະທາດຫລວງ; pronounced [pʰā.tʰâːt lǔa̯ŋ] "Great Stupa") is a gold-covered Buddhist stupa in Vientiane, the capital city of Laos. Since its initial establishment, suggested to be in the 3rd century AD, the stupa has undergone reconstructions, including in the 1930s, due to invasions of the area.

== History ==
Buddhist missionaries from the Mauryan Empire are believed to have been sent by Emperor Ashoka, including Bury Chan or Praya Chanthabury Pasithisak and five Arahanta monks, who brought a sacred relic (believed to be the breastbone) of the Buddha and enshrined it into the stupa in the 3rd century BC.

In the 16th century, King Setthathirat relocated his capital from Luang Prabang to Vientiane and ordered the construction of the temple in 1566. It was constructed about 4 km from the centre of Vientiane, at the end of Pha That Luang Road, and named accordingly. The bases had a length of 69 metres each, and the stupa was 45 metres high, surrounded by 30 smaller stupas.

In 1641, a Dutch envoy of the Dutch East India Company, Gerrit van Wuysthoff, visited Vientiane and was ceremonially received by King Sourigna Vongsa at the temple. He wrote that he was particularly impressed by the "enormous pyramid ... and the top was covered with gold leaf weighing about a thousand pounds". The stupa was repeatedly plundered by the Burmese, Siamese, and Chinese.

Pha That Luang was destroyed by the Thai invasion in 1828. It was not until 1900 that the French restored it to its original design, based on detailed drawings from 1867 by the French architect and explorer Louis Delaporte. The first attempt to restore it was unsuccessful, and it had to be redesigned and then reconstructed in the 1930s.

== Architecture ==
The first level is 223 by 226 feet (68 by 69 metres); the second is 157 feet (48 metres) along each side; and the third level is 98 feet (30 metres) along each side. From ground to pinnacle, Pha That Luang is 147.6 feet (45.0 metres) high.

The area around the stupa is gated, to keep out traffic. Previously, visitors could drive around the whole complex. The encircling walls are roughly 279 feet (85 metres) long on each side and contain Lao and Khmer sculptures, including one of Jayavarman VII.

== Gallery ==
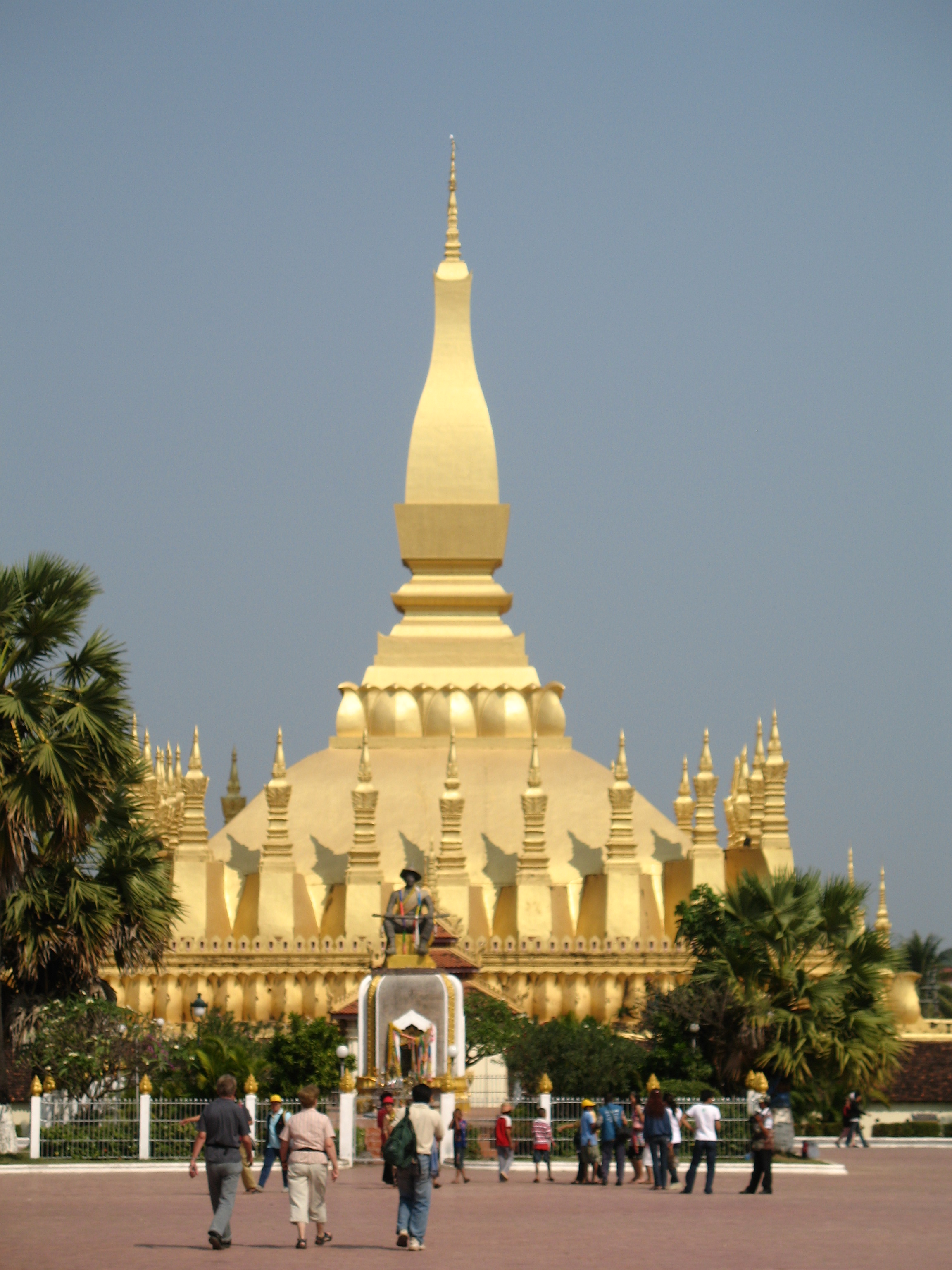
Pha That Luang stupa

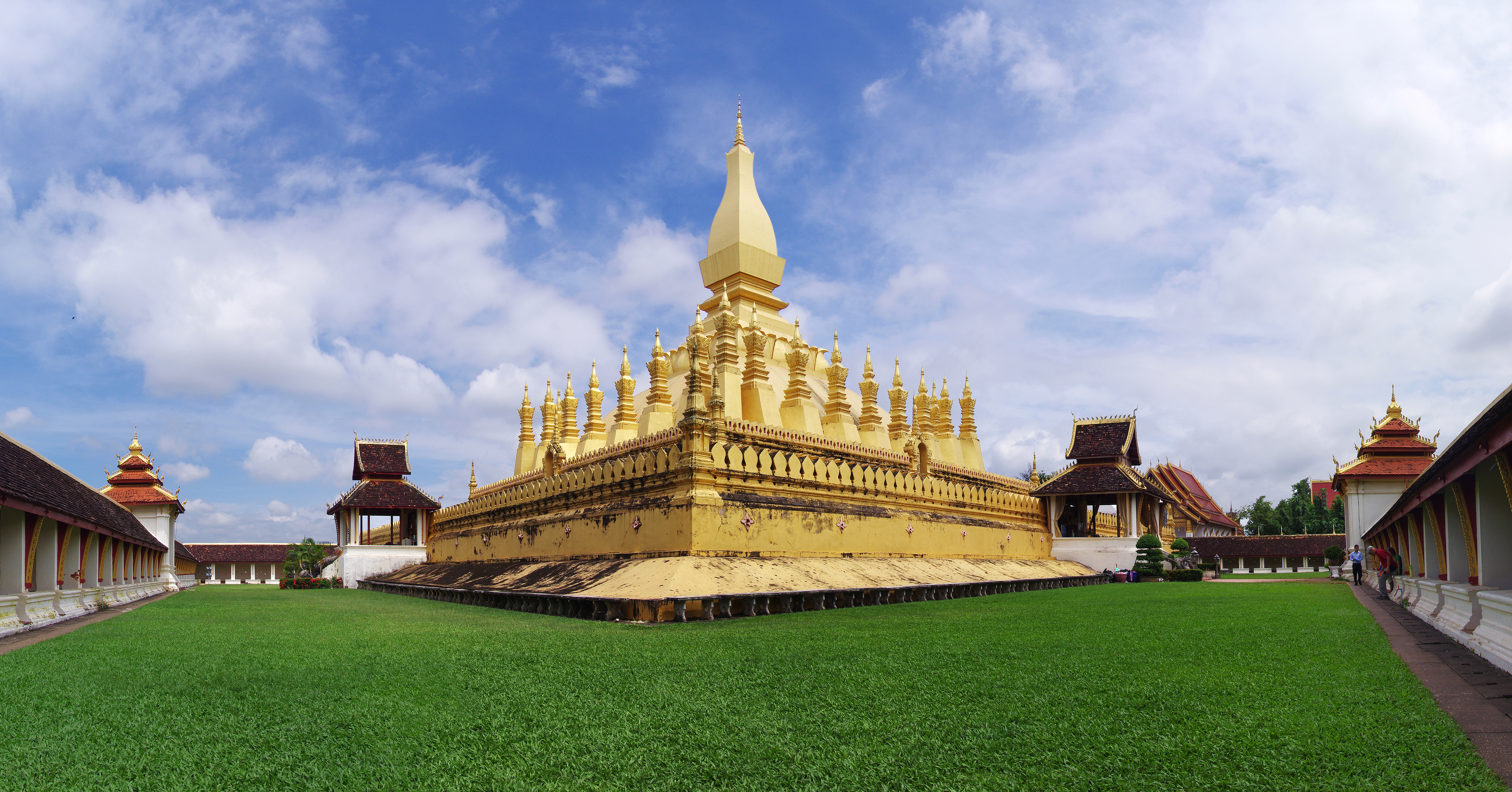
View of the stupa from inside the temple

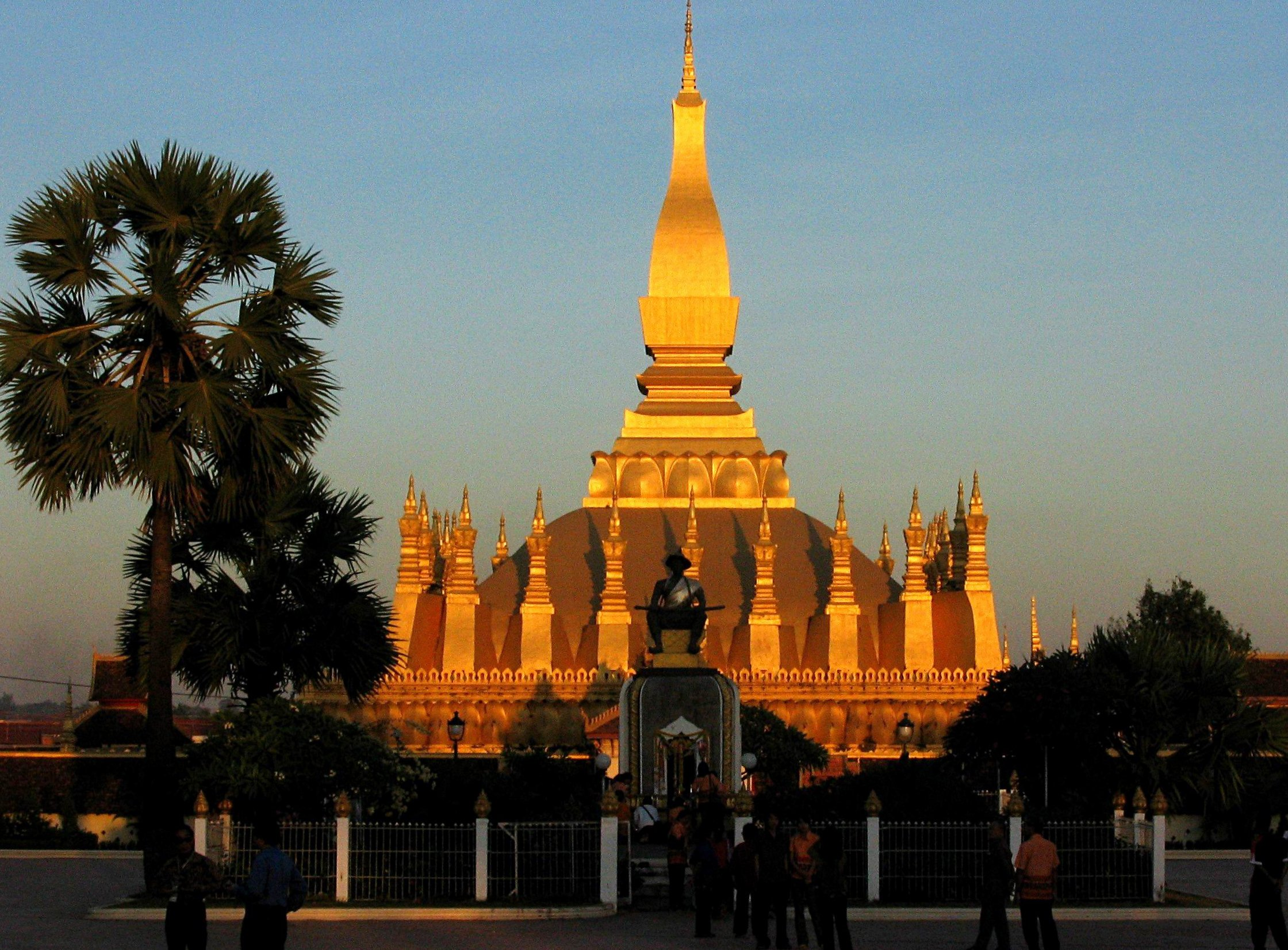
Pha That Luang at sunset

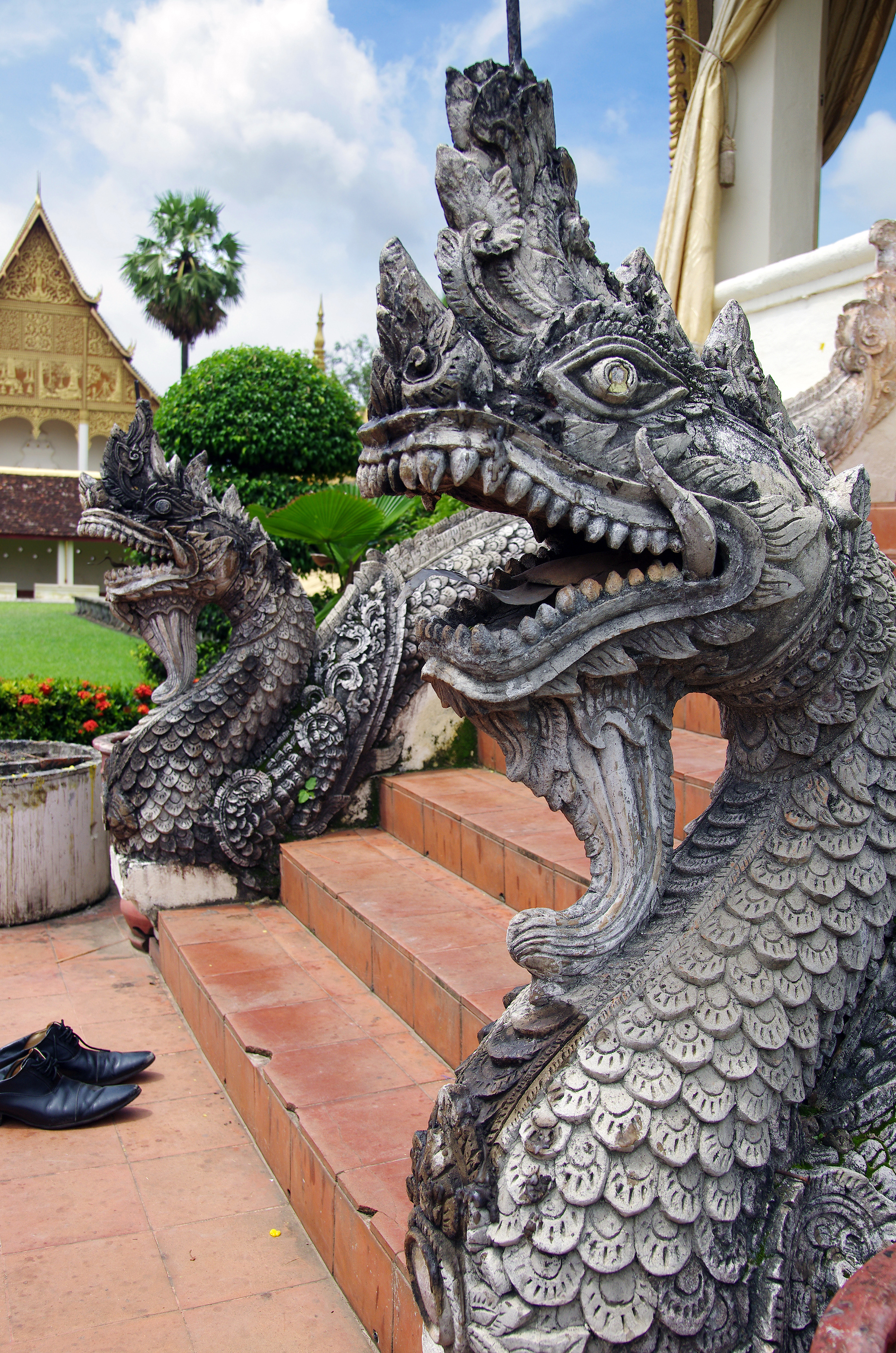
Nāga inside the temple

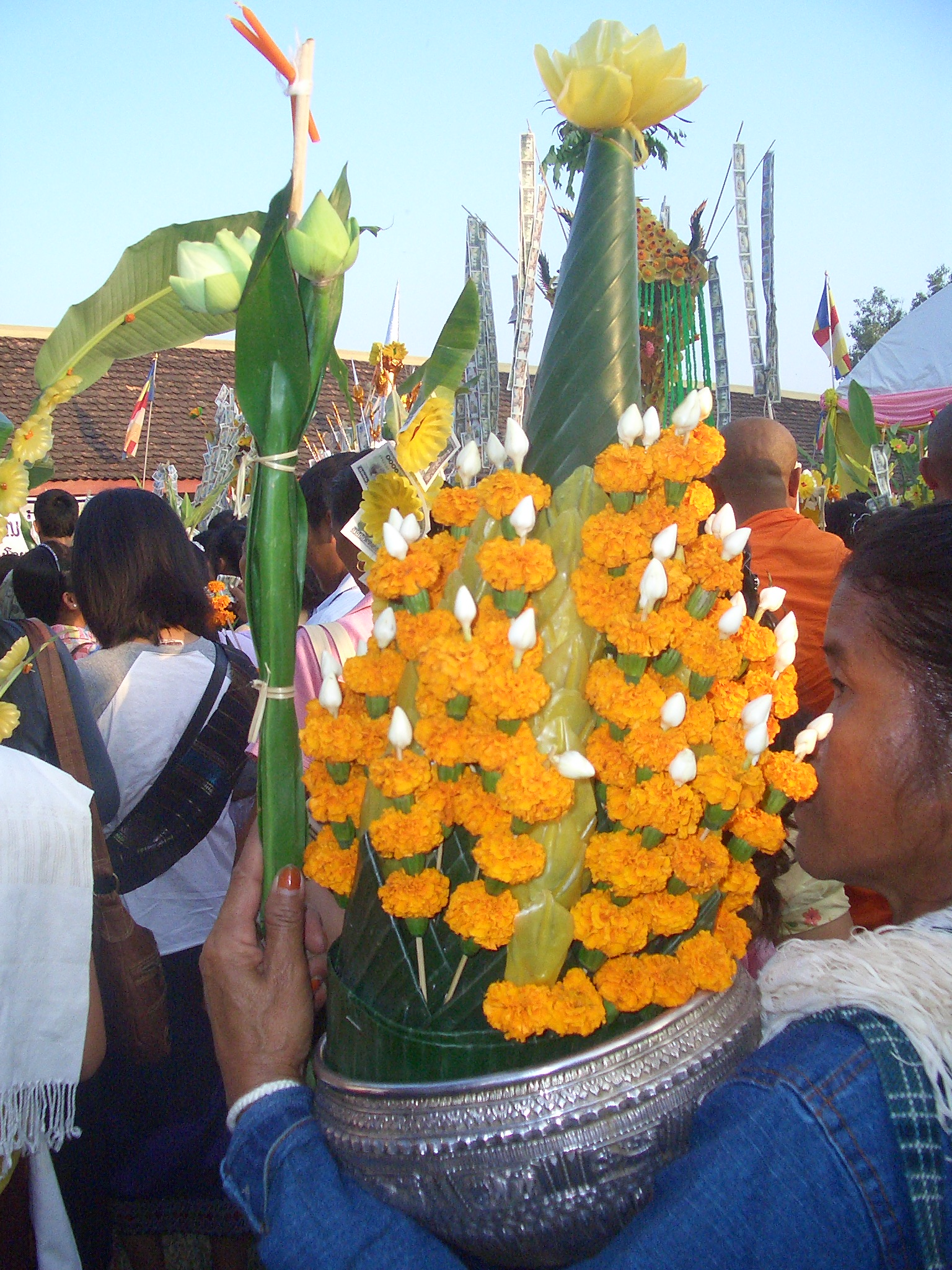
That Luang Festival (2010)

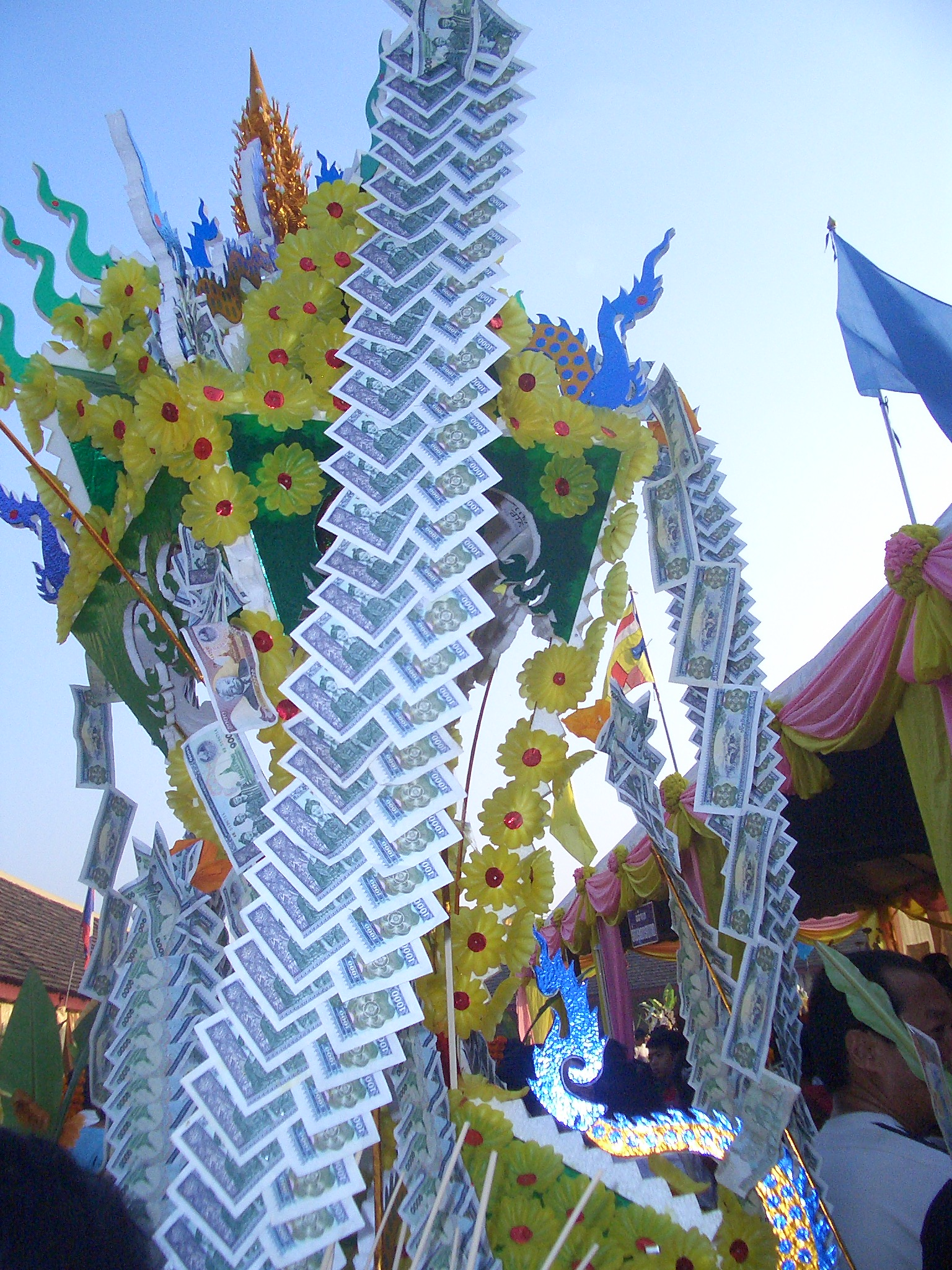
Thatluang Festival (2010)

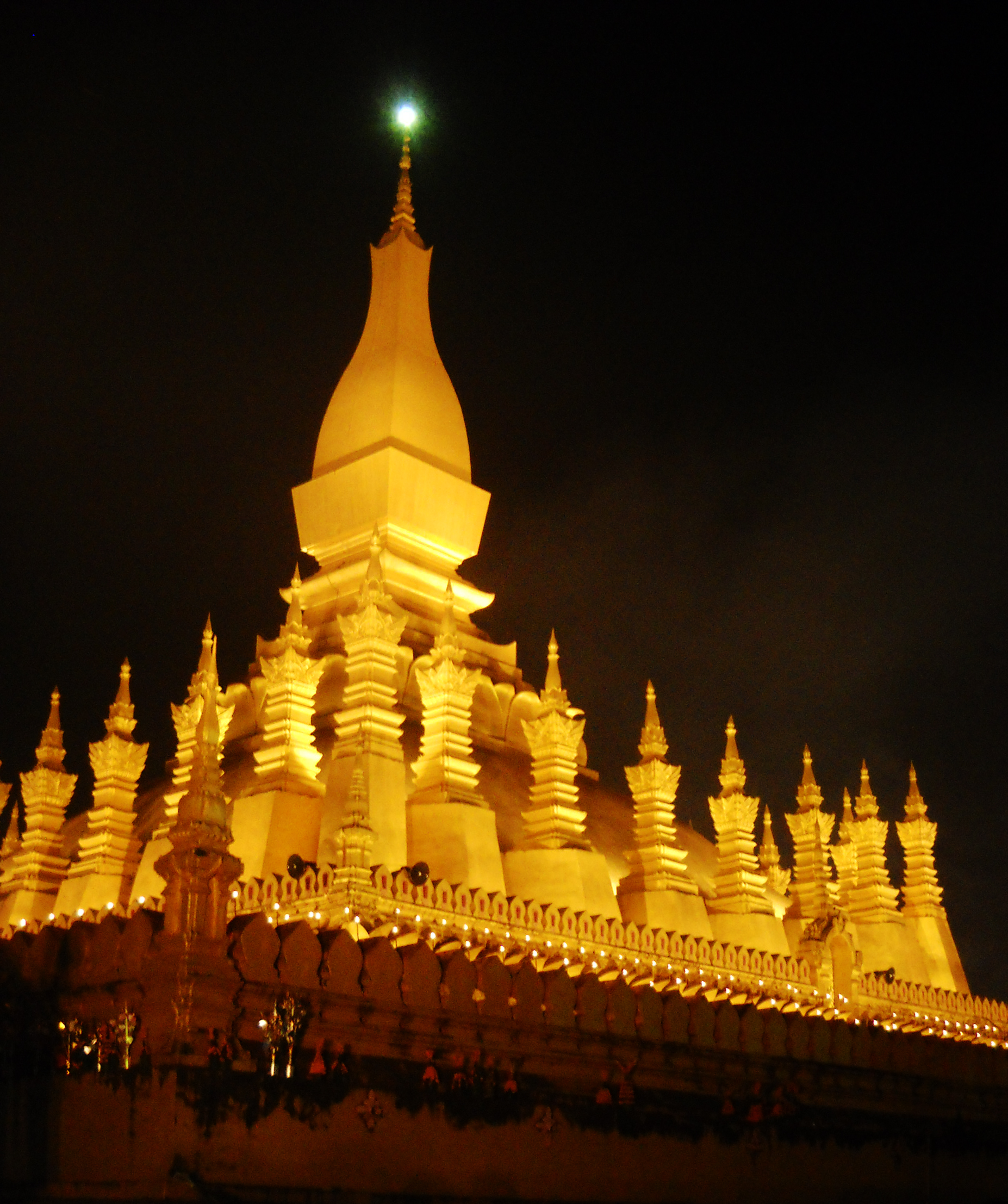
That Luang stupa at night

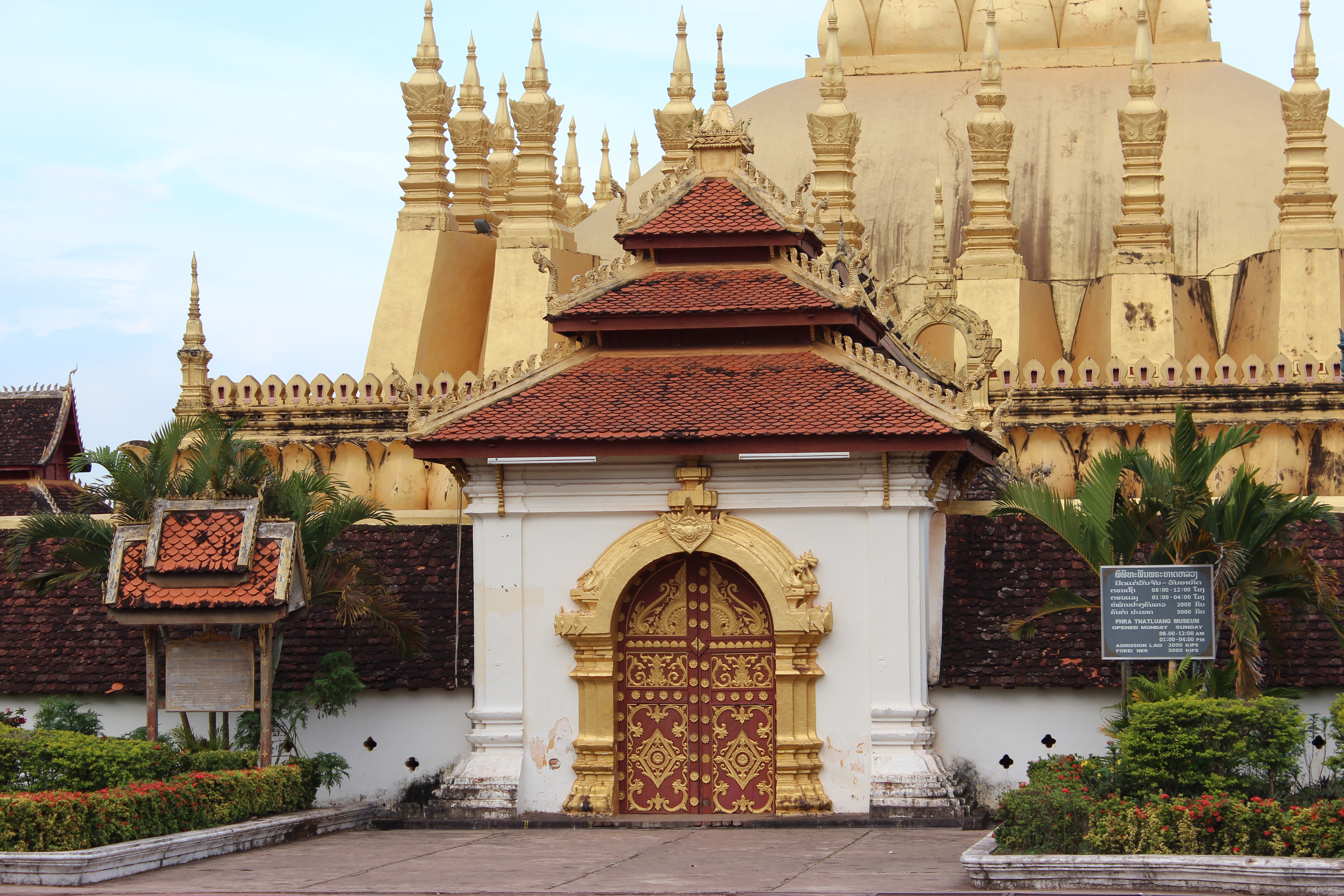
That Luang

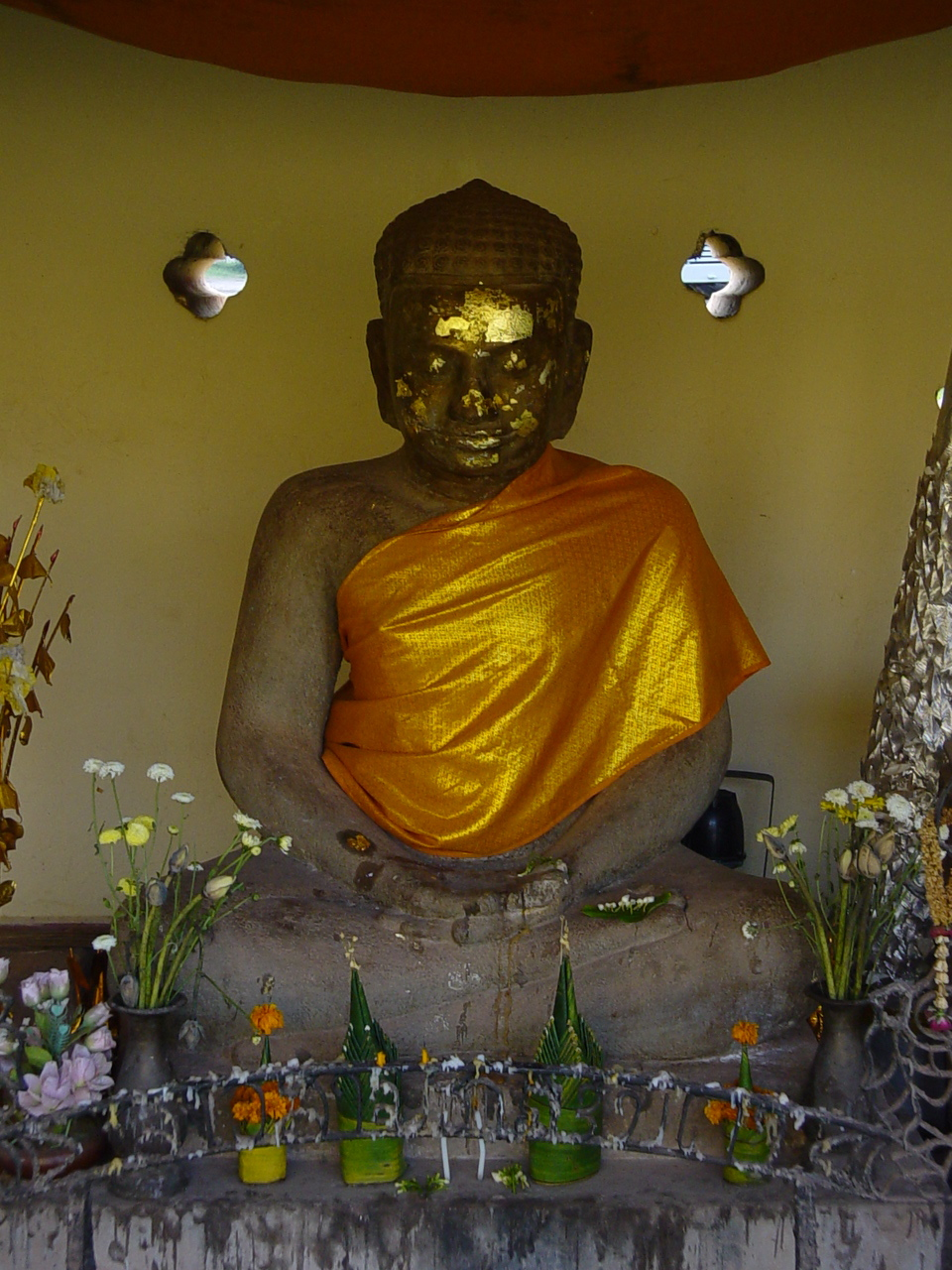
King Jayavarman VII of the Khmer Empire

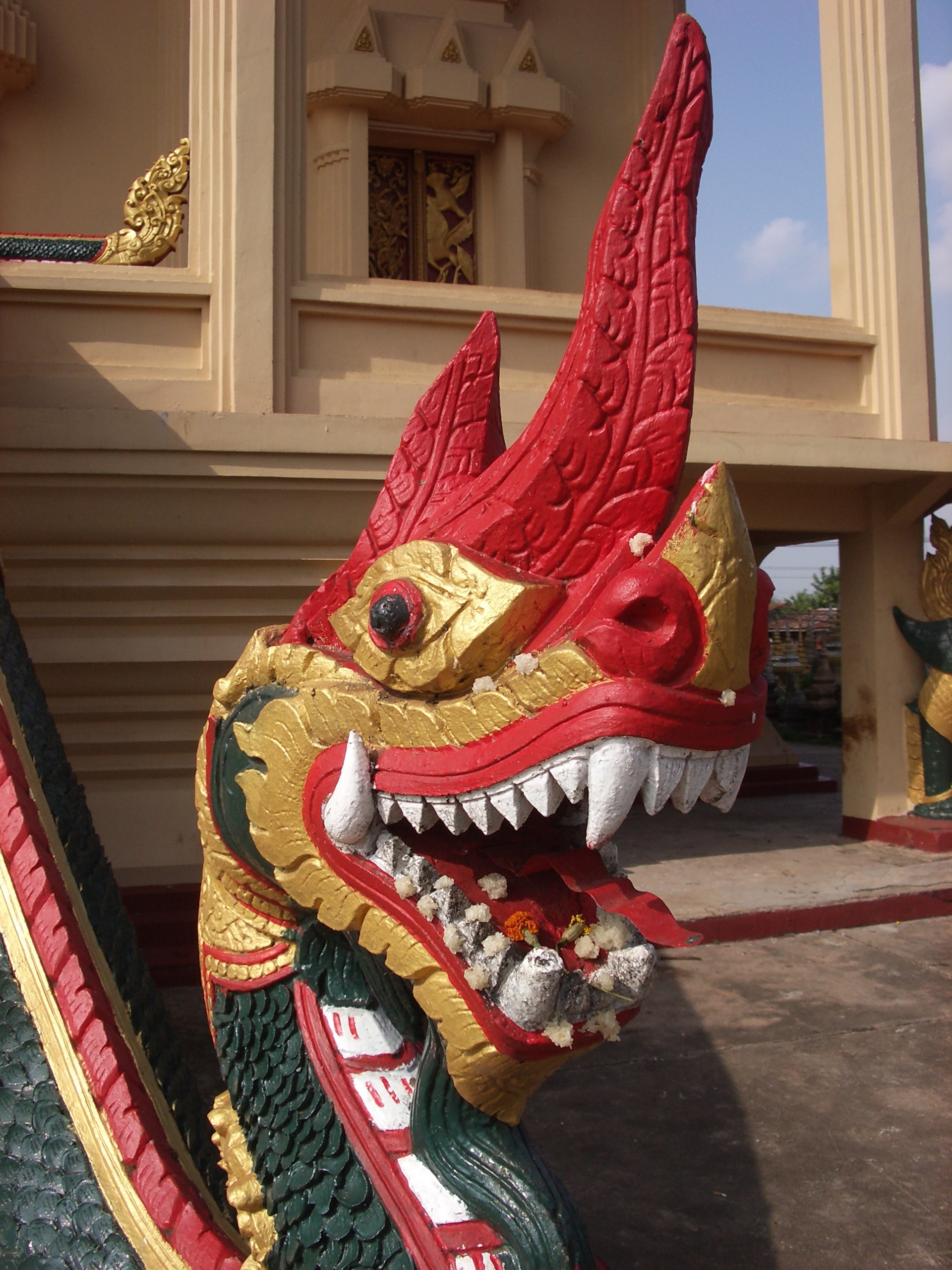
Naga Pagoda of west Pha That Luang, October 2006
