= Boun Suang Huea =

Lotian boat racing festival

Boun Suang Huea (ບຸນຊ່ວງເຮືອ)
- Observed by: Laos
- Type: Buddhist
- Date: October 15
- Related to: Vap Full Moon Poya (in Sri Lanka); Wan Ok Phansa (in Thailand); Thadingyut (in Myanmar); Lhabab Duchen (in Tibet and Bhutan)

The boat racing festival called Boun Suang Heua or Boun Xuang Heua (Lao: ບຸນຊ່ວງເຮືອ [bùn sūa̯ŋ.hɯ́a̯]) or Loy Krathong (Lao: ລອຍກະໂທງ [lóːj kā.tʰóːŋ]) is celebrated every year, particularly in Laos, usually in October, at the end of Buddhist Lent.

There are spectacular canoe races organized in the cities (mainly Vientiane, Luang Prabang, Savannakhet, and Champassak province) and villages along the Mekong.

Boats are decorated with flowers and candles. Also, small rafts made of bamboo and decorated with candles are launched down the streams and river.

== Origin of the tradition ==
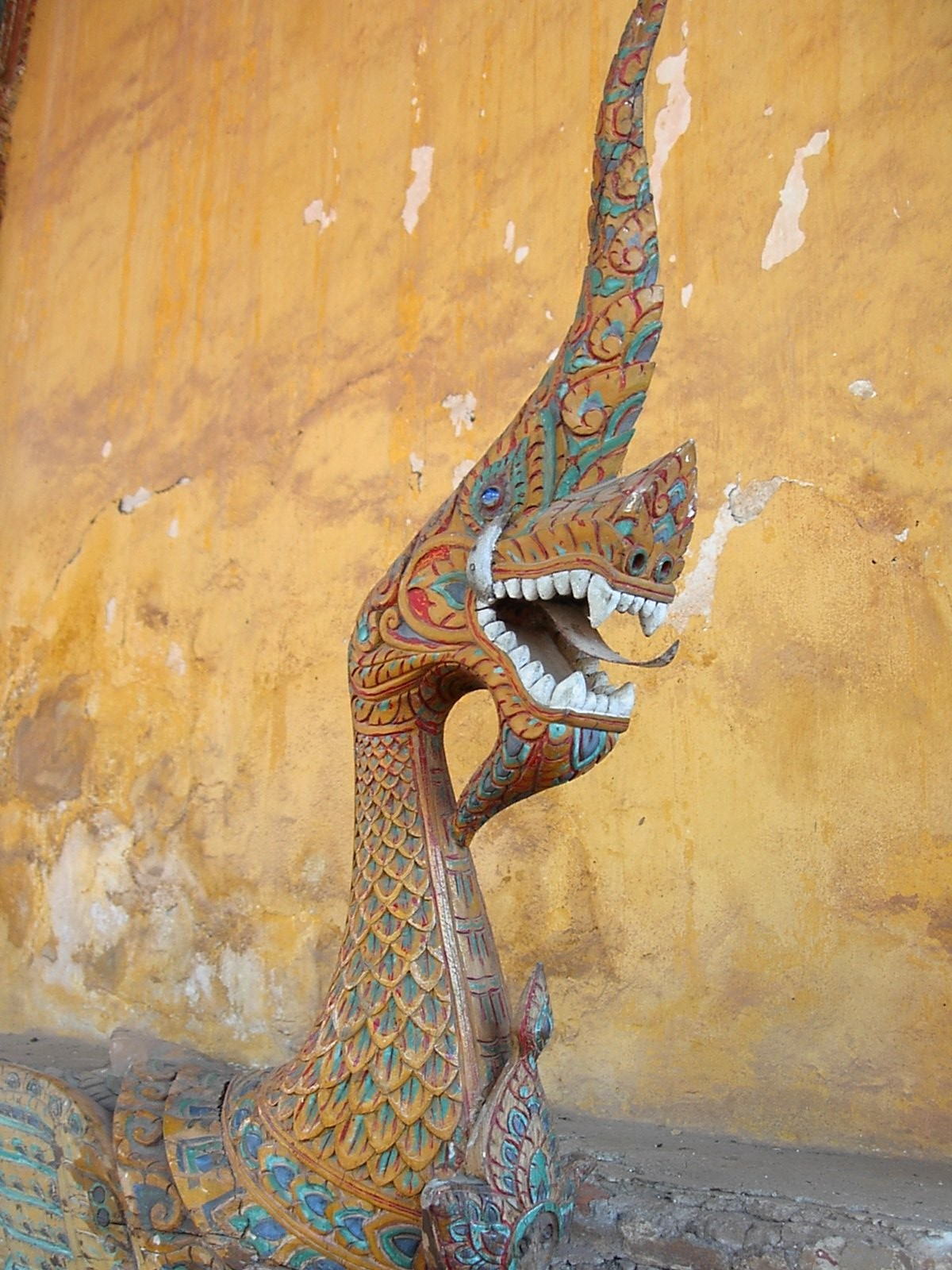
A naga, protector of Vientiane.

The canoe race has existed for thousands of years. Daily life is greatly organized around the Mekong River and its numerous tributaries. Indeed, it was both a major means of transport and communication, but also a food source thanks to the fish.

Although today's canoe race is essentially a social, sporting and commercial event, it still remains associated with the naga, the protective river spirits of Vientiane, which, according to Lao beliefs, carry away the rice paddies and return them back to the water.
