= That Luang Festival =

Annual Buddhist celebration in Laos

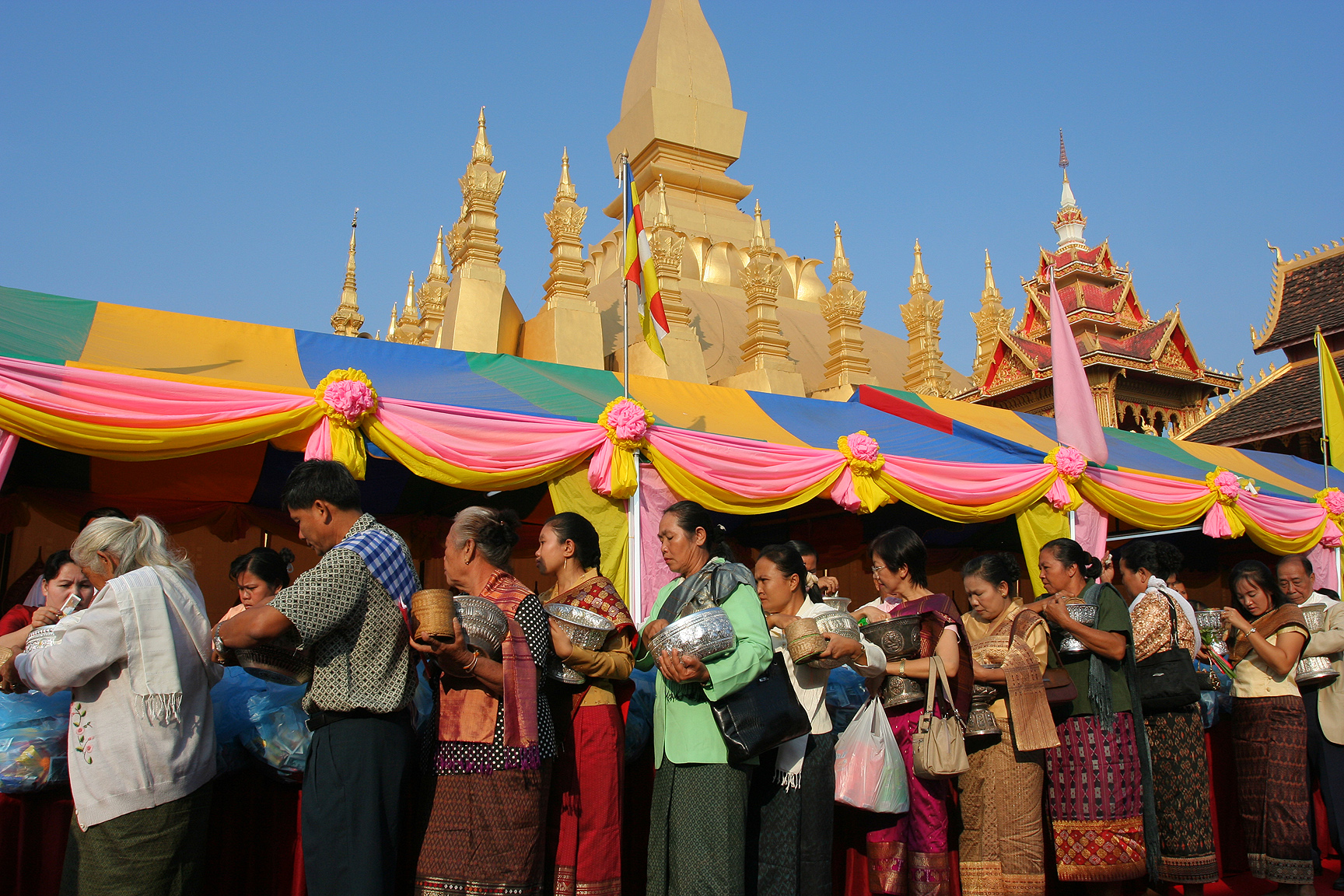

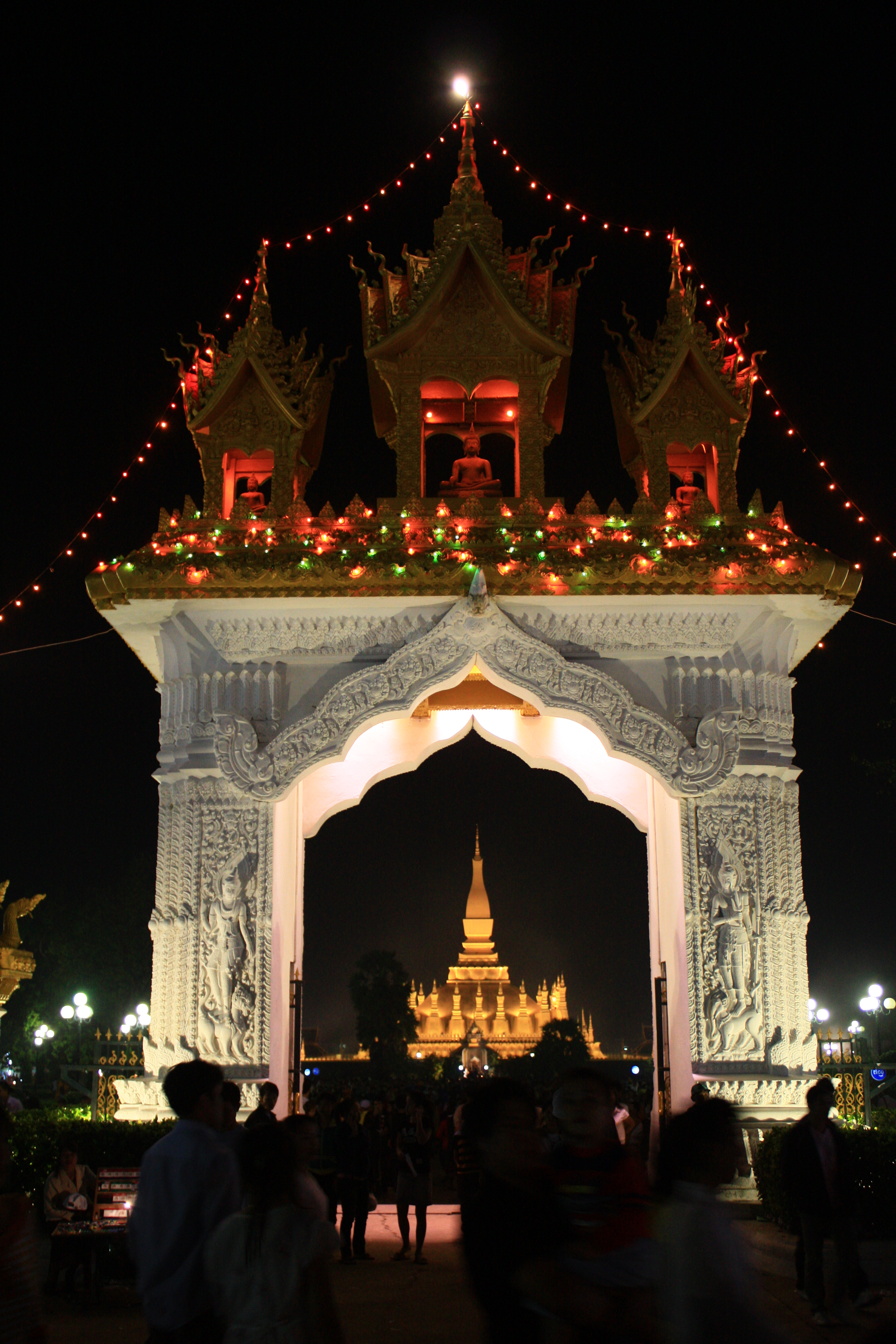
That Luang Festival

That Luang is the national symbol and most important religious monument of Laos. Vientiane's most important Theravada Buddhist festival, "Boun That Luang", is held here for three days during the full moon of the twelfth lunar month (November).

== The monument ==
The That Luang dates from 1566. It has been destroyed and ransacked and renovated numerous times. The site is sacred as the Lao believe that the stupa enshrines a relic of Buddha.

== Festivities ==
Monks and laypeople from all over Laos congregate to celebrate the occasion with three days of religious ceremony followed by a week of festivities, day and night. The procession of laypeople begins at Wat Si Muang in the city center and proceeds to That Luang to make offerings to the monks in order to accumulate merit for rebirth into a better life. The religious part concludes as laypeople, carrying incense and candles as offerings, circulate That Luang three times in honor of Buddha. Folk and popular music troupes and drama performances provide entertainment at the festival.
