= List of airports in Laos =

This is a list of airports in Laos (the Lao People's Democratic Republic), sorted by location.

== Airports ==
Airport name written in bold indicates availability of commercial flights.

**Location**	**ICAO**	**IATA**	**Airport name**
Attopeu	VLAP	AOU	Attapeu International Airport
Ban Hat Tai	VLHS	HOE	Ban Huoeisay Airport (Ban Houei Sai/Ban Houay Xay)
Ton Pheung	VLBK	BOR	**Bokeo International Airport**
Khong Island	VLKG	KOG	Khong Island Airport
Luang Namtha	VLLN	LXG	**Luang Namtha Airport**
Luang Prabang	VLLB	LPQ	**Luang Prabang International Airport**
Muang Xay	VLOS	ODY	**Oudomsay Airport**
Pakse	VLPS	PKZ	**Pakse International Airport**
Phonsavan	VLXK	XKH	**Xieng Khouang Airport**
Saravane	VLSV	VNA	Saravane Airport
Sam Neua	VLSN	NEU	**Nong Khang Airport**
Savannakhet	VLSK	ZVK	**Savannakhet Airport**
Sayaboury	VLSB	ZBY	**Sayaboury Airport**
Thakhek	VLTK	THK	Thakhek Airport
Vientiane	VLVT	VTE	**Wattay International Airport**
Phongsaly	VLFL	PCQ	**Phongsaly Boun Neua Airport**

== See also ==
- Transport in Laos
- List of airports by ICAO code: V#VL - Laos
