= Royal Air Lao =

Laotian airline, 1962–1976

IATA	ICAO	Call sign
LS / RY	LAO	LAO
- Founded: 1962
- Ceased operations: 1976
- Destinations: See destinations
- Parent company: Royal Lao Government
- Headquarters: Vientiane, Laos

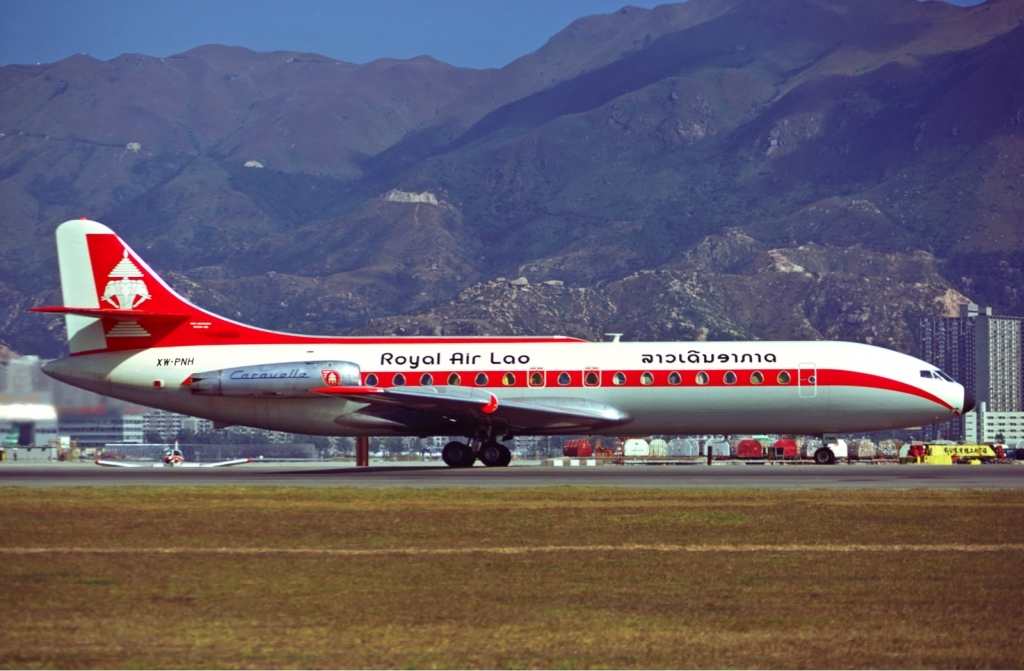
Royal Air Lao Sud Aviation Caravelle III (XW-PNH) at Hong Kong's Kai Tak Airport in 1974

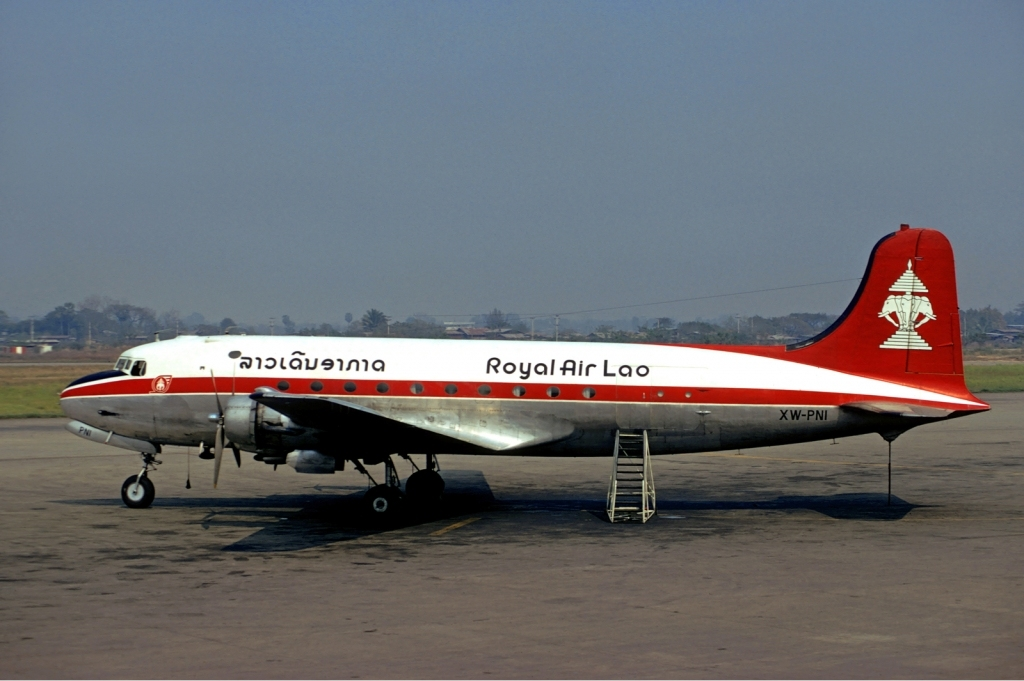
Royal Air Lao Douglas C-54A-10-DC Skymaster in 1975

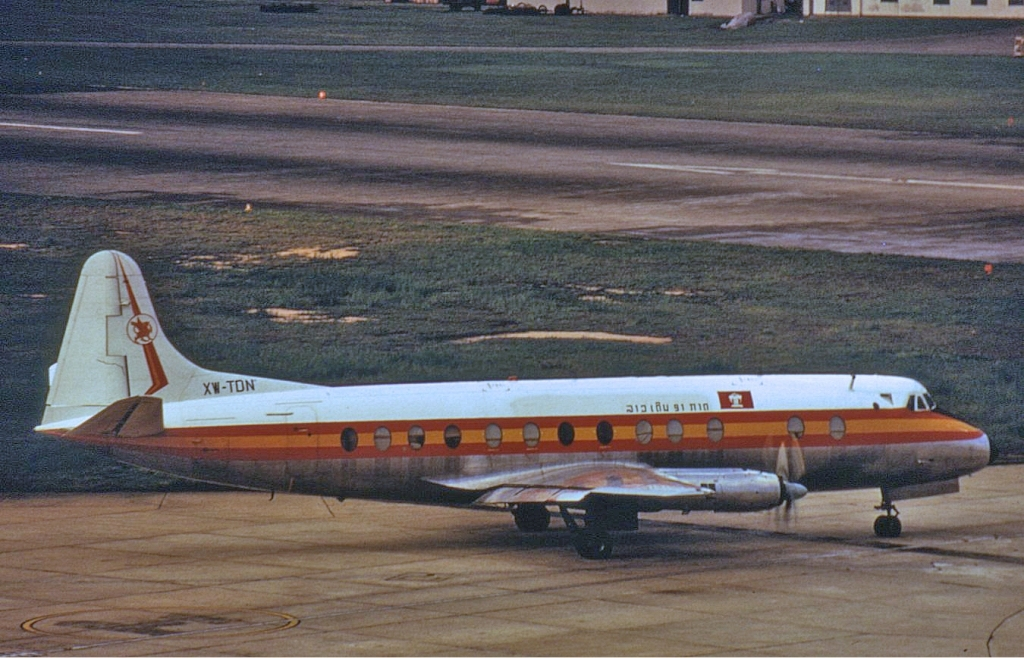
Royal Air Lao Vickers Viscount in 1968

Royal Air Lao was the national air carrier of the Kingdom of Laos that operated from 1962 to until the Communist takeover of the country in 1975.

== History ==
The company was founded in 1962. In September 1976 the Civil Aviation Company was formed from the merger of Royal Air Lao and Lao Air Lines. Today the successor is Lao Airlines.

== Destinations ==
- British Hong Kong
  - Hong Kong – Kai Tak Airport
- Cambodia
  - Phnom Penh – Pochentong Airport
- China
  - Canton – Canton International Airport
- Kingdom of Laos
  - Attapeu - Attapeu Airport
  - Huay Xai – Huay Xay Airport
  - Luang Prabang – Luang Prabang International Airport
  - Pakxe – Pakxe Airport
  - Thakhek – Thakhek Airport
  - Sayaboury – Sayaboury Airport
  - Savannakhet – Savannakhet Airport
  - Vientiane – Vientiane Airport (Hub)
- Malaysia
  - Kuala Lumpur – Subang International Airport
- Vietnam
  - Hanoi – Hanoi International Airport
  - Saigon – Tan Son Nhat Air Base
- Thailand
  - Bangkok – Bangkok International Airport
  - Chiang Mai – Chiang Mai International Airport

== Fleet ==
Aircraft that were in service were:

- Douglas C-47 Skytrain
- Lockheed L-188 Electra
- Boeing 307 Stratoliner
- Sud Aviation Caravelle III (XW-PNH)
- Curtiss C-46 Commando
- Douglas DC-3
- Douglas C-54A-10-DC Skymaster
- Vickers Viscount
- Convair 440

== Codeshare partners ==
Royal Air Lao codeshared with the following airlines:

- Air France

== See also ==
- Air Vietnam
- Royal Air Cambodge
