= Nathong Airport =

Nathong Airport ສະຫນາມບິນນາທອງ
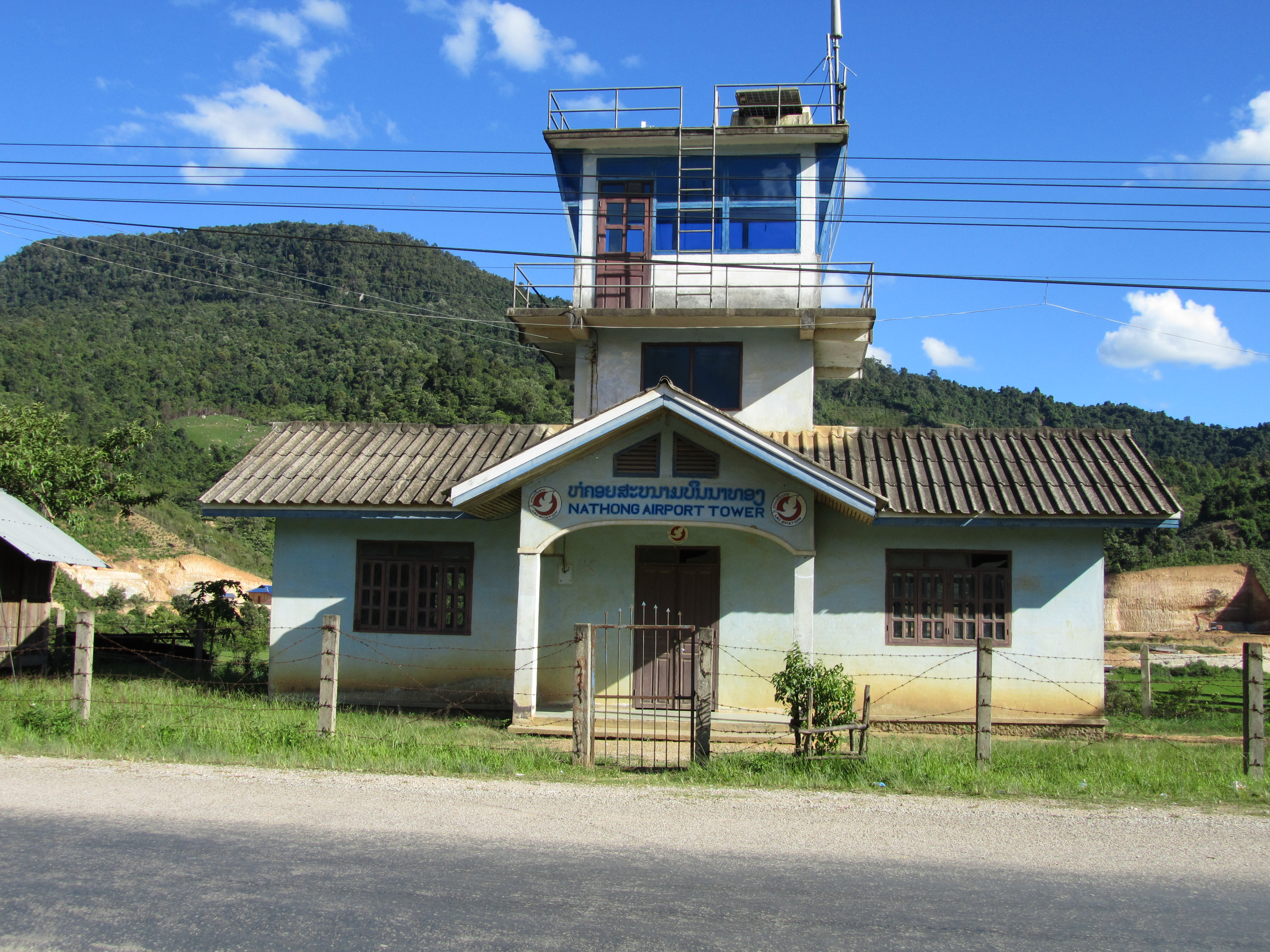
- Nathong Airport Tower in 2010.
- IATA: NEU; ICAO: VLSN

Summary
- Airport type: Public
- Location: Xam Neua, Houaphan Province, Laos
- Coordinates: 20°25′06″N 104°03′58″E

Map
- Location of airport in Laos

Runways
Direction	Length		Surface
Direction	ft	m	Surface
	3,715	1,132

Nathong Airport (IATA: NEU, ICAO: VLSN) was a domestic airport that served Xam Neua, the capital of Houaphan Province, Laos. It was closed in mid-2024 upon completion of the larger Nong Khang Airport, 35km to the north.

Airlines	Destinations
Lao Airlines	Vientiane
Lao Skyway	Vientiane

== Accidents and incidents ==
On October 19, 2000, Lao Aviation Flight 703 was crashed into the mountains near Nathong Airport. Eight passengers died while nine passengers and crew survived, but suffered injuries.

On April 21, 2013, a Lao Air (later Lao Skyway) Twin Otter crashed on take-off, coming to rest in a canal 200 metres from the end of the runway, after clipping some trees. There were no fatalities but five of the 16 passengers were taken to the Friendship Hospital in Vientiane with chest injuries.
