= Lao People's Army Air Force =

Air warfare branch of Laos' military

- ກອງທັບອາກາດປະຊາຊົນລາວ
- Emblem of Lao People's Armed Forces
- Founded: 1975; 51 years ago
- Country: Laos
- Type: Air force
- Role: Aerial warfare
- Size: 37 aircraft
- Part of: Lao People's Armed Forces
- Headquarters: Vientiane

Commanders
- Chief of Air Force: Major General Khamlek Sengphachanh

Insignia
- Roundel

- Fin flash

Aircraft flown
- Attack: Yak-130, K-8
- Helicopter: Z-9, -Ka-32, Mi-17/172
- Transport: MA600, An-26

The Lao People's Army Air Force (LPAAF) (Lao: ກອງທັບອາກາດປະຊາຊົນລາວ, romanized: Kongthap Akat Paxaxon Lao) is the air force of Laos.

== History ==
The present-day LPAAF is descended from the Aviation Laotienne, which was established by the French and later became the Royal Lao Air Force. Pathet Lao guerrilla forces began to operate a few aircraft from 1960, as did another rebel group led by Kong Le. Kong Le forces were later re-incorporated into the Royal Lao Air Force. The communist take-over in 1975 resulted in the adoption of the present title.

A military co-operation agreement with Russia in 1997 resulted in 12 Mil Mi-17 (second hand) helicopters entering service in mid-1999 to follow on from previous deliveries of Mi-8s. SAM systems also entered service such as the SA-3 'Goa'.

== Bases ==
The LPAAF operates from two main bases, Vientiane and Phonsavan, with another three bases supported by detachments from the main units. Apart from the main military air bases, there are also a number of smaller airports and airfields around the country which are frequently used by the air force and the semi-military airline Lao Airlines. In 1961 Laos had 25 airstrips capable of landing a C-47.

- Wattay International Airport
- Long Tieng
- Pakse International Airport
- Xieng Khouang Airport

== Aircraft ==
=== Current inventory ===
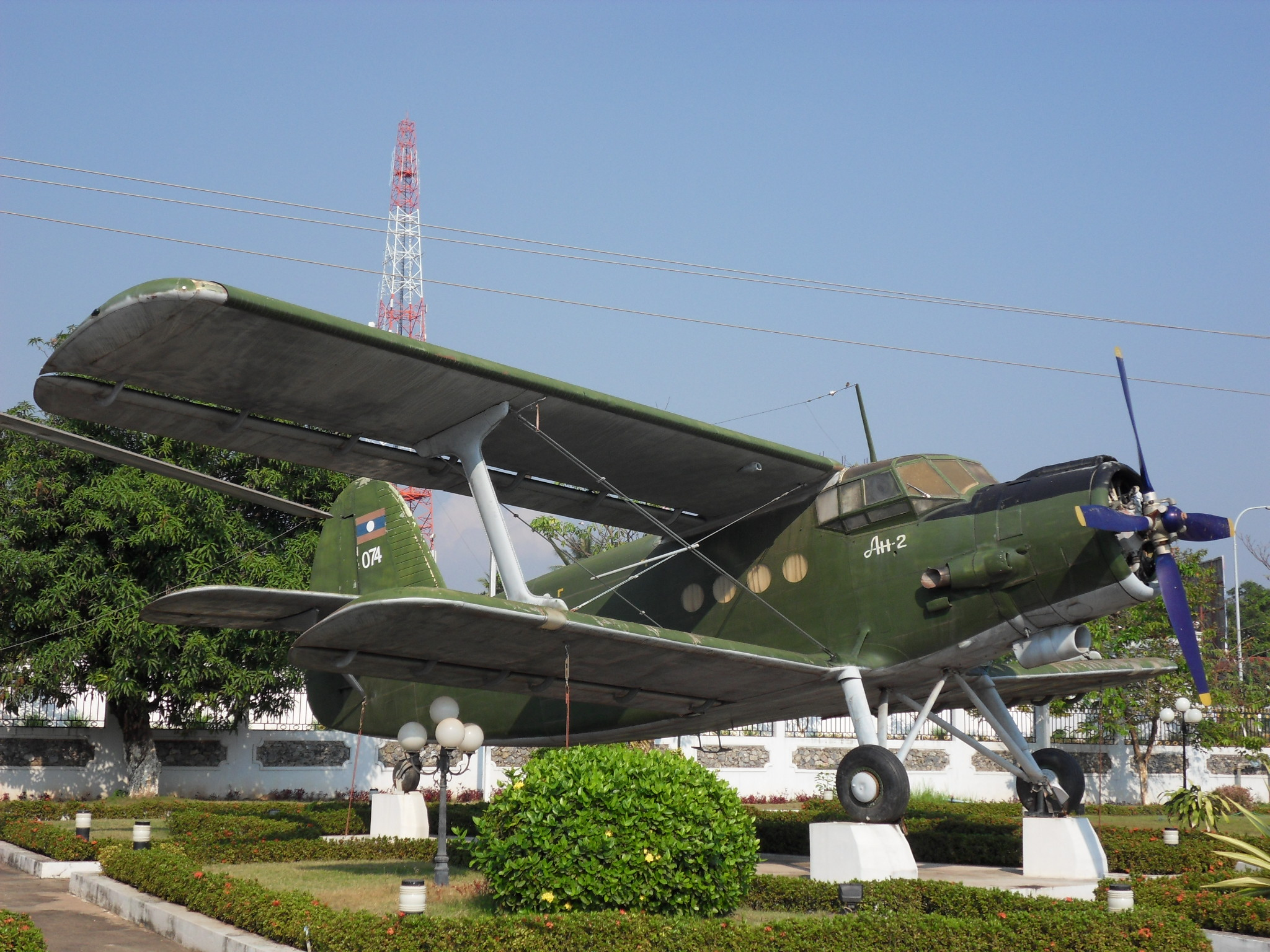
A retired Antonov An-2 on display

Aircraft	Origin	Type	Variant	In service	Notes
Transport
Xian MA600	China	Transport		1	
Antonov An-26	Soviet Union	Transport		1	
Helicopters
Mil Mi-17	Soviet Union	Transport / Utility	Mi-17/172	17	
Harbin Z-9	China	Utility		4	
Kamov Ka-27	Soviet Union	Utility	Ka-32	2	
Trainer / Light attack
Yakovlev Yak-130	Russia	Advanced trainer / Light attack		3	6 on order. 1 crashed in 2024.
Hongdu K-8	China	Jet trainer / Light attack		4	

== See also ==
- Royal Lao Air Force
- Laotian Civil War
