= Lanexang Airways International =

Full-service airline of Laos

Lanexang Airways International ສາຍການບິນ ລ້ານຊ້າງ ສາກົນ
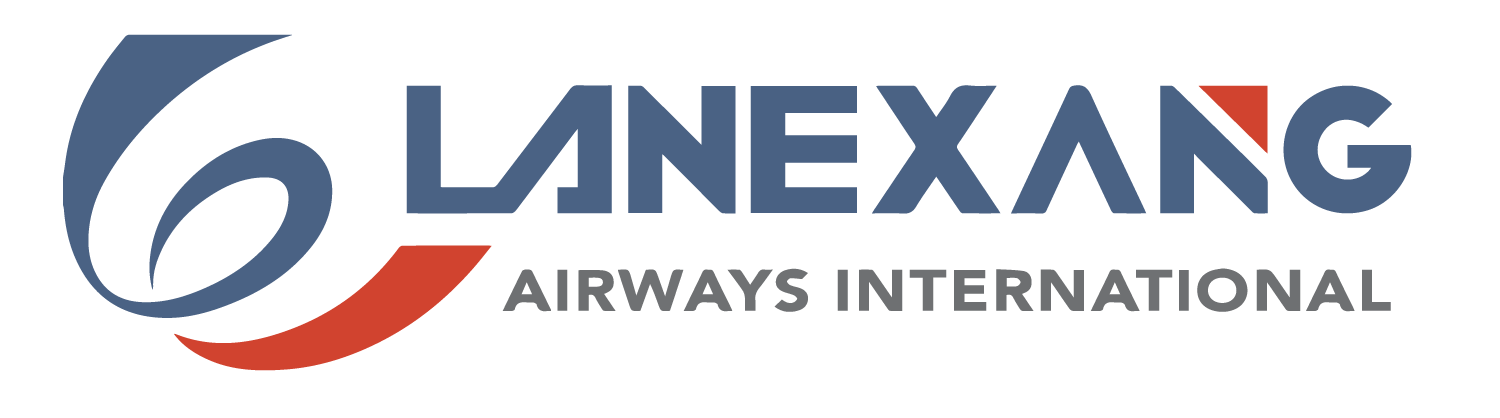
IATA	ICAO	Call sign
5A	LXW	LANEXANG
- Founded: 2021; 5 years ago
- Commenced operations: 29 December 2023; 2 years ago
- Hubs: Wattay International Airport
- Fleet size: 3
- Destinations: 4
- Headquarters: Wattay International Airport, Souphanouvong Road, WangThong Village, Sikhottabong District, Vientiane
- Key people: Bounma Chanthavongsa (Managing Director)
- Website: www.lxairways.com

Lanexang Airways International (Lao: ສາຍການບິນ ລ້ານຊ້າງ ສາກົນ) is a Vientiane–based airline fully owned by Lanexang Aviation Company Limited (Lao: ບໍລິສັດ ລ້ານຊ້າງ ການບິນສາກົນ ຈຳກັດ). It provides scheduled air service to 4 destinations in Laos, including Vientiane, Luang Prabang, Bokeo and Phonsavan. The airline's main hub is at Wattay International Airport and has an all-ATR 72 fleet. The company slogan was Fascination of Lao, later changed to Fly With Inspiration.

The head office of Lanexang Airways International is located near the Department of Civic Aviation of Ministry of Public Works and Transport, Wattay International Airport, Souphanouvong Road, Wang Thong Village, Sikhottabong District, Vientiane.

== History ==
The company was founded in 2021, and received their first aircraft in August 2023. Their inaugural flight took place on 29 December 2023. In February 2025, the airline secured US$15 million in funding from the Lao Development Bank to develop new routes and acquire new aircraft. The airline aims to grow their fleet from 2 ATR turboprop aircraft to 5 by the end of 2025, and add two Boeing aircraft.

== Destinations ==
As of September 2025, these destinations are currently served by Lanexang Airways International.

Country	City	Airport	Notes	IATA Code
Laos	Vientiane	Wattay International Airport	Hub	
Laos	Luang Prabang	Luang Prabang International Airport		
Laos	Golden Triangle	Bokeo International Airport		
Laos	Phonsavan	Xieng Khouang Airport		

== Fleet ==
=== Current fleet ===
As of July 2026, Lanexang Airways International operates the following aircraft:

Lanexang Airways International
Aircraft	In service	Orders	Passengers	Notes
ATR 72-500	3	—	68	

=== Fleet development ===
In August 2023, the airline received its first ATR 72-500 from Vietnam Airlines, with their second coming from Cambodia Angkor Air in November 2024. Both aircraft are in an all-economy seating configuration.

== See also ==
- List of airlines of Laos
- List of companies of Laos
- Transport in Laos
