= Lao Skyway =

Regional airline of Laos

Lao Skyway ລາວເດີນອາກາດ
IATA	ICAO	Call sign
LK	LLL	LAVIE
- Founded: 24 January 2002; 24 years ago
- Hubs: Wattay International Airport
- Fleet size: 13
- Destinations: 9
- Parent company: Ministry of National Defense's office
- Headquarters: Wattay International Airport, Vientiane, Laos
- Employees: 200+
- Website: www.laoskyway.com

Lao Skyway, formerly known as Lao Air (Lao: ລາວເດີນອາກາດ), is a state-owned domestic airline, headquartered at Wattay International Airport in Vientiane, Laos. It operates scheduled and charter services to airports in Laos.

== History ==
Lao Air was established on 24 January 2002, as a helicopter and aircraft charter service company. On 8 December 2003, the airline signed a lease-to-purchase agreement with Lane Xang Minerals Limited Company for the lease of a Cessna Grand Caravan to use on its charter services. The agreement signaled the start of its fixed-wing operation. On 7 October 2005, a second leased Cessna Grand Caravan was added to its fleet.

On 14 April 2007, its regular scheduled services began using the Cessna Grand Caravan. Lao Air rebranded as Lao Skyway in late 2013. In April 2014 the company began using larger passenger aircraft on its scheduled routes. As of 2023, the airline is owned by Lao Skyway Group.

== Destinations ==
As of July 2024, Lao Skyway operates scheduled flights to the following airports in Laos:

- Bokeo – Bokeo International Airport
- Luang Namtha – Louang Namtha Airport
- Luang Prabang – Luang Prabang International Airport
- Muang Xay – Oudomsay Airport
- Pakse – Pakse International Airport
- Phongsaly – Boun Neua Airport
- Hauphanh – Nongkhang Airport
- Xiang Khouang – Xieng Khouang Airport
- Savannakhet – Savannakhet Airport
- Sayaboury – Sayaboury Airport
- Vientiane – Wattay International Airport (Base)
- Viraboury – Sepon Airport

== Fleet ==
As of July 2024, Lao Skyway operates the following aircraft (6 helicopters, 7 fixed-wings):

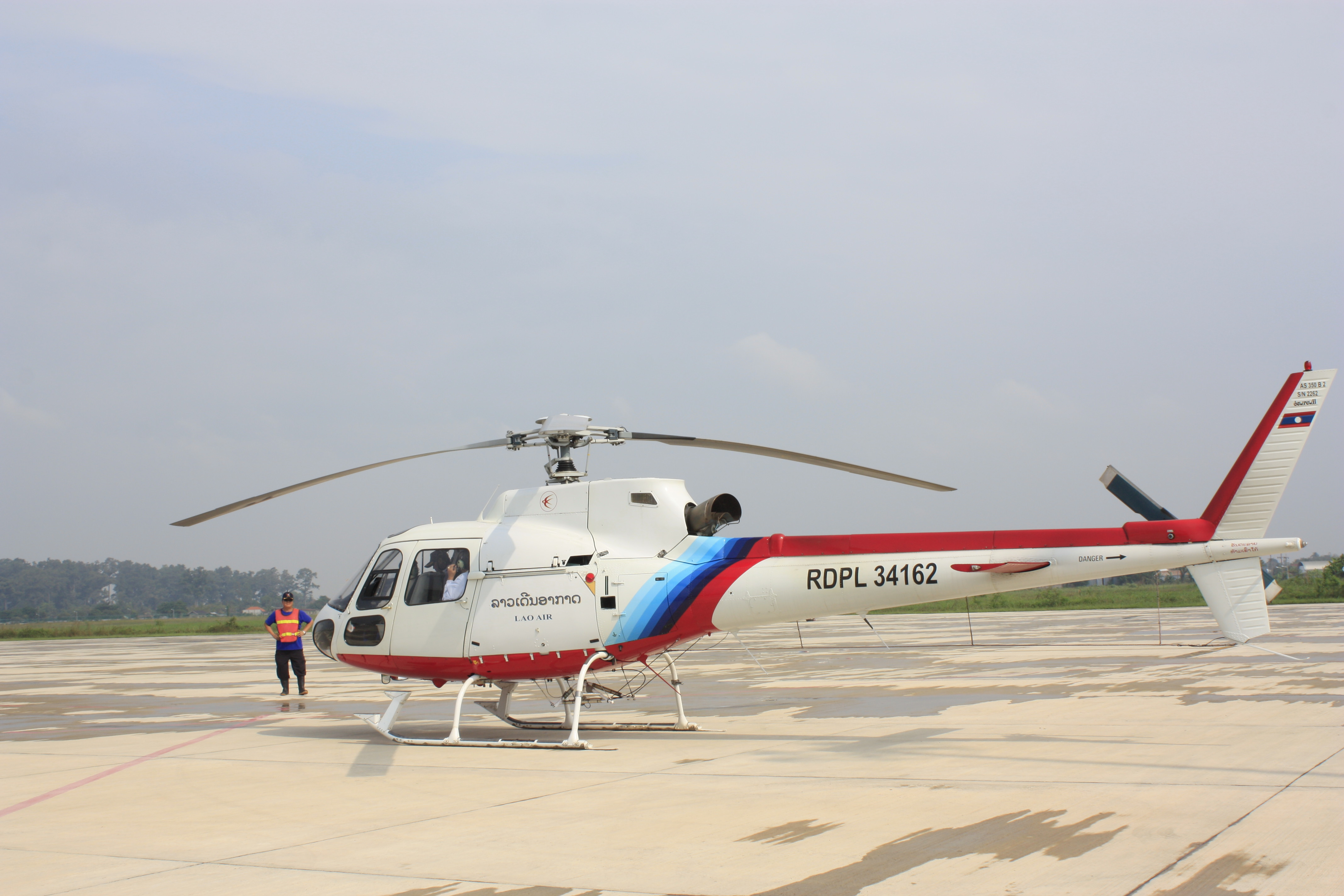
Lao Skyway AS350 b2

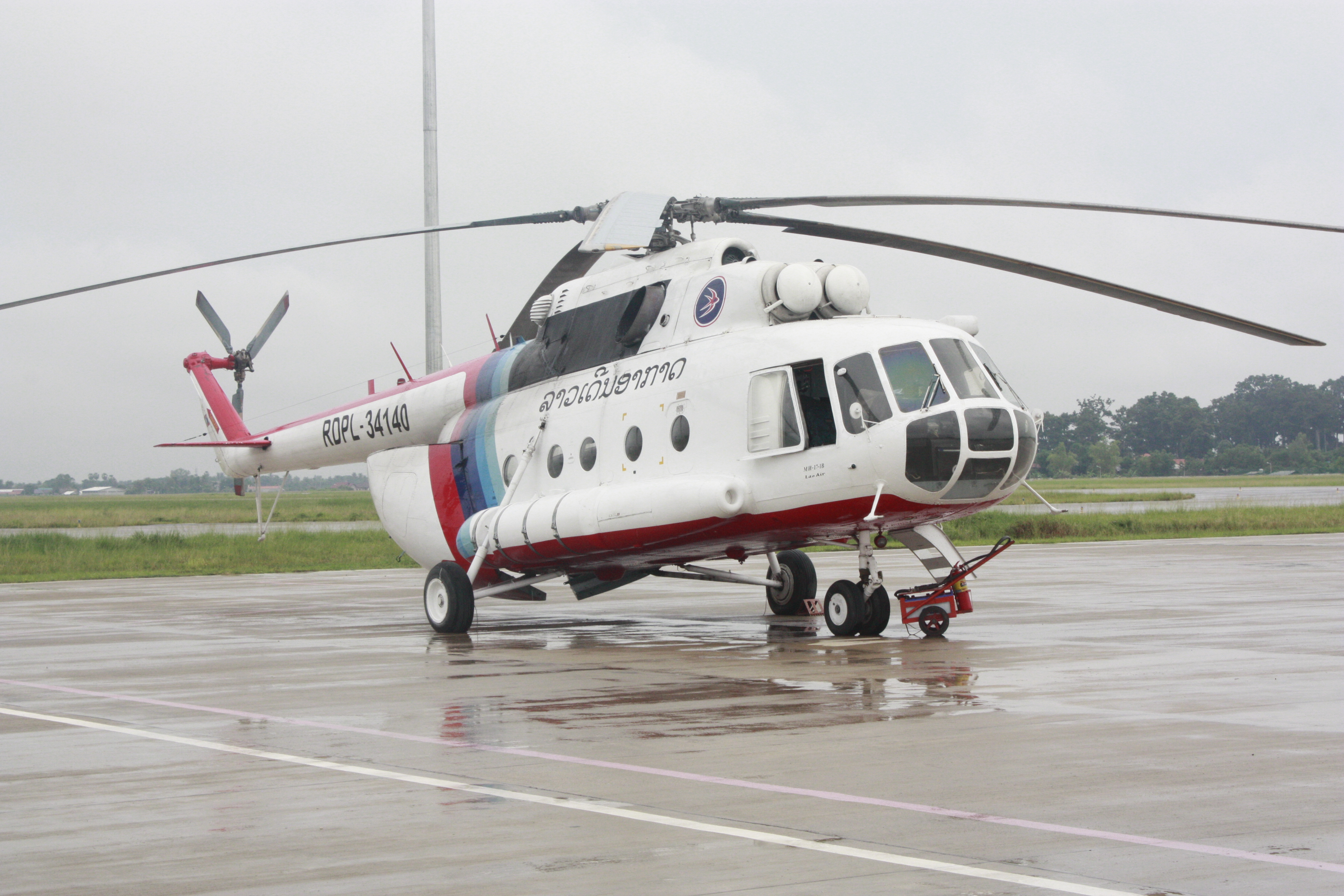
Lao Skyway Mi17

Lao Skyway Cessna C208b Grand Caravan

Lao Skyway fleet
Aircraft	In service	Orders	Notes
Airbus Eurocopter AS350 B3	1	—	Charter flights, surveying, medevac, rescue
Airbus Eurocopter AS350 B2	2	—	Charter flights, surveying, medevac, rescue
Mil Mi-17	3	—	Charter, MIA
Xian MA-60	3 (as of July 2026)	—	For scheduled passenger flights
Xi'an MA600	1 (as of July 2026)		Launch Customer
Cessna 208 Caravan	2	—	For scheduled passenger flights and medevac
Let L-410 Turbolet	2	—	Long term mining company charter
Total	13	-	

== Accidents ==
- 11 April 2009: Flight 200, a Cessna 208B Grand Caravan, engine failure emergency landing in field.
- 17 April 2013: Flight 201, a de Havilland Canada DHC-6 Twin Otter 300, crashed after hitting trees on takeoff from Nathong Airport, with five injuries.
- 13 November 2015: Flight 265, a Xian MA-60 flight from Luang Prabang to Vientiane had a runway excursion on landing due to a mechanical fault in the steering column.
- 26 April 2016: Eurocopter AS 350 Ecureuil, engine failure emergency landing.
