= Lao Airlines =

Flag carrier of Laos

Lao Airlines ການບິນລາວ

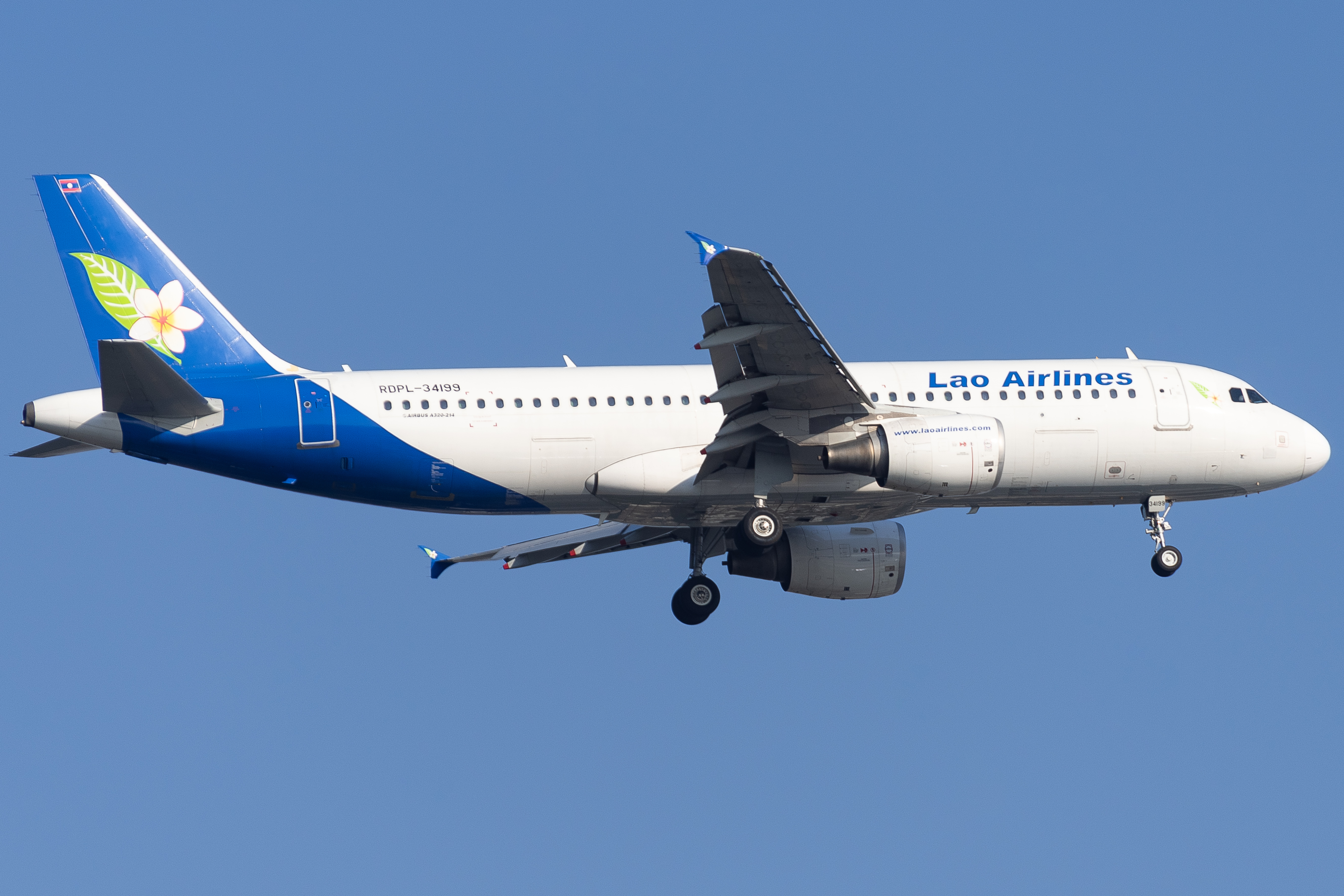
- Lao Airlines Airbus A320
IATA	ICAO	Call sign
QV	LAO	LAO
- Founded: 10 January 1976; 50 years ago (as Civil Aviation Company)
- Commenced operations: 1989; 37 years ago (as Lao Aviation since 1979)
- Hubs: Vientiane; Luang Prabang
- Focus cities: Pakse
- Frequent-flyer program: ChampaBonus
- Fleet size: 13
- Destinations: 21
- Headquarters: Vientiane, Laos
- Key people: Saleum Tayarath (acting managing director)
- Employees: 1,000
- Website: www.laoairlines.com

Lao Airlines State Enterprise (Lao: ລັດວິສາຫະກິດການບິນລາວ) is the flag carrier of Laos, headquartered in Vientiane. It operates domestic and international services to countries such as Cambodia, China, South Korea, Thailand and Vietnam. Its main operating base is Wattay International Airport in Vientiane. It is owned by the Ministry of Public Works and Transport.

== History ==
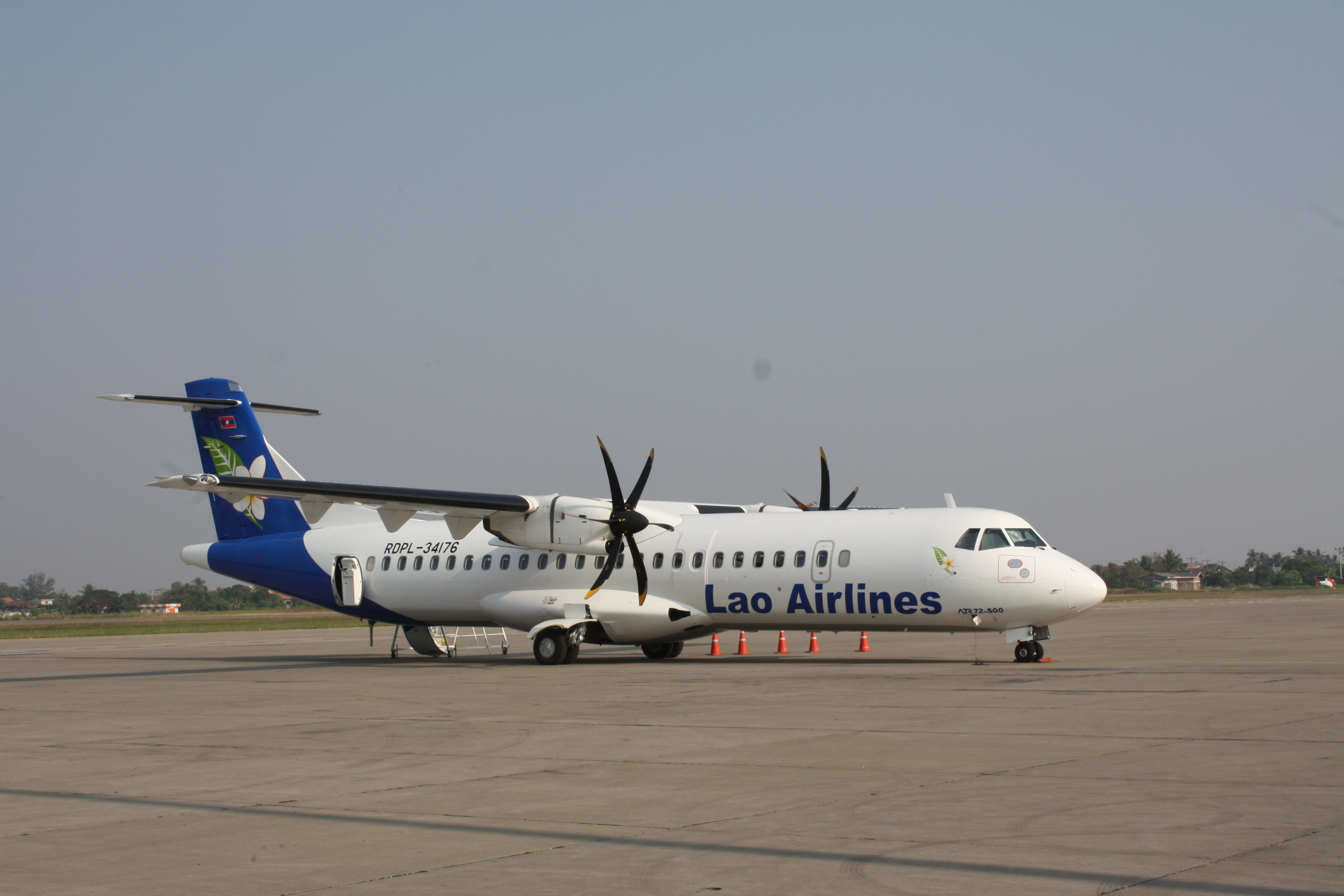
Lao Airlines ATR 72-500 at Wattay International Airport, Vientiane

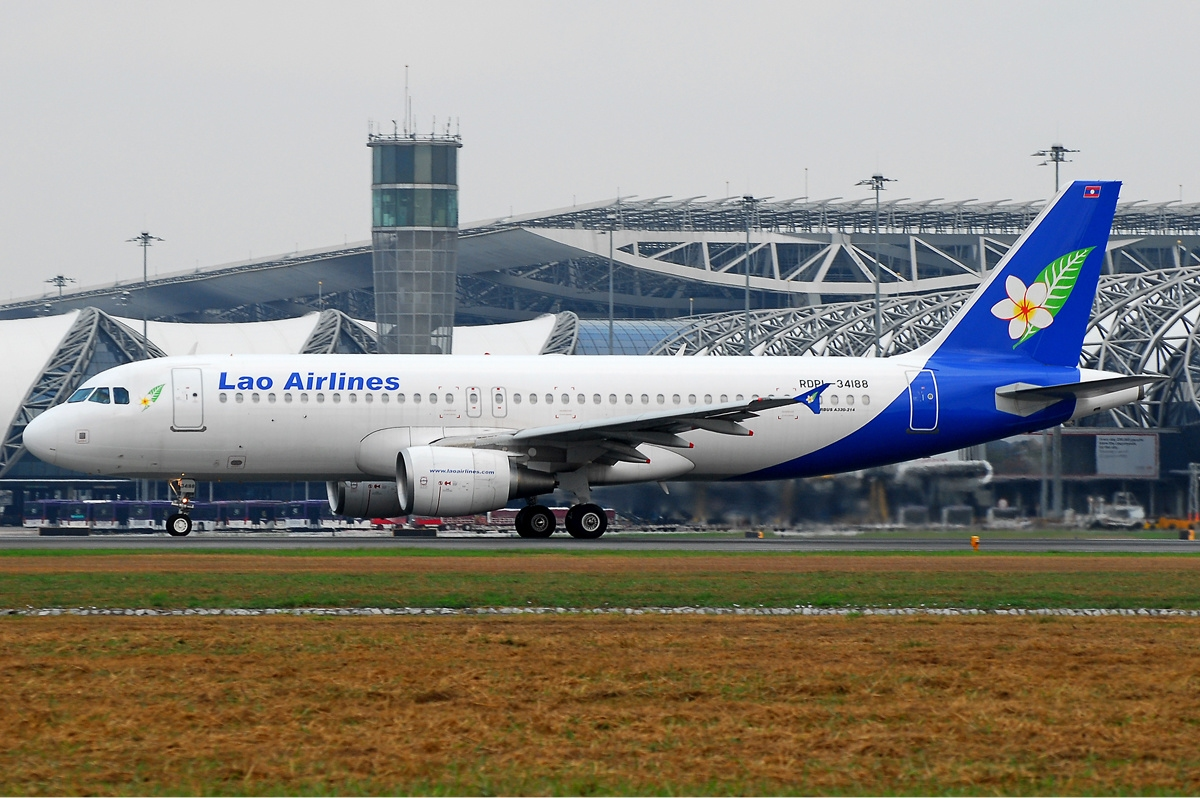
Lao Airlines Airbus A320-200 at Suvarnabhumi Airport, Samut Prakan Province, Thailand

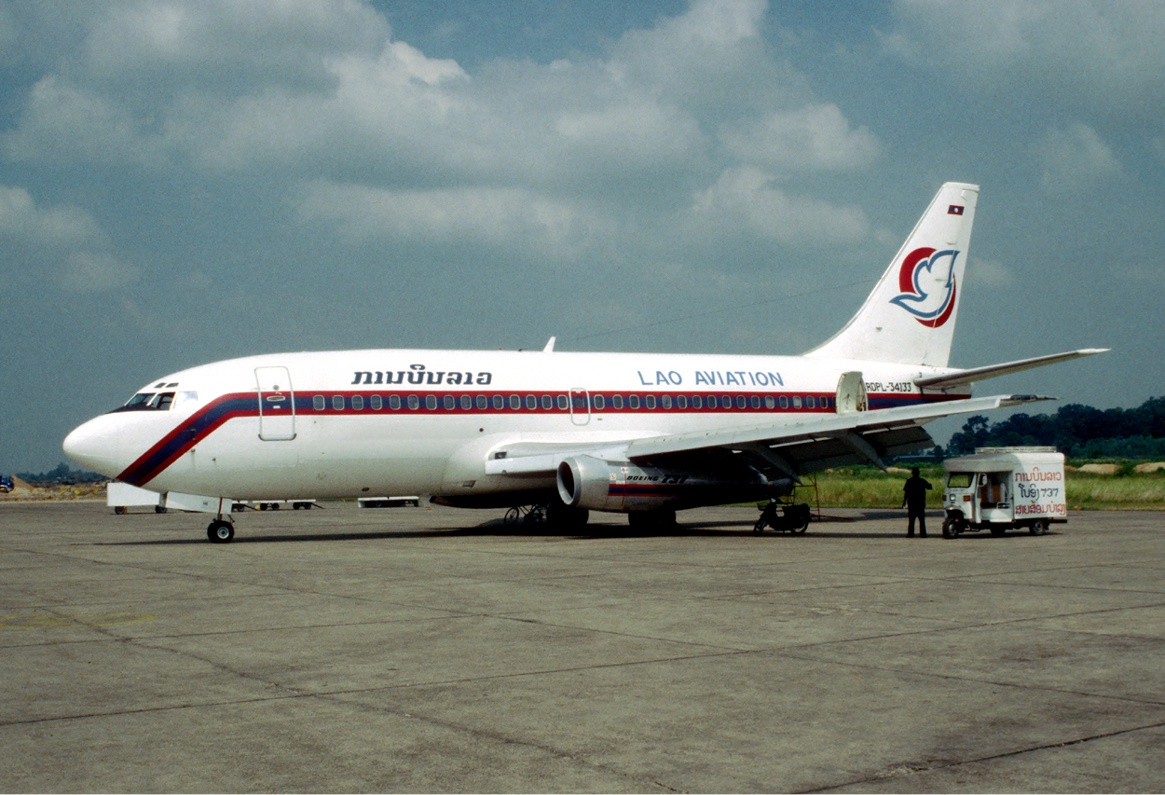
Lao Airlines (formerly: Lao Aviation, RDPL-34133) Boeing 737-200 with old livery from the early 2000s parked at Wattay International Airport

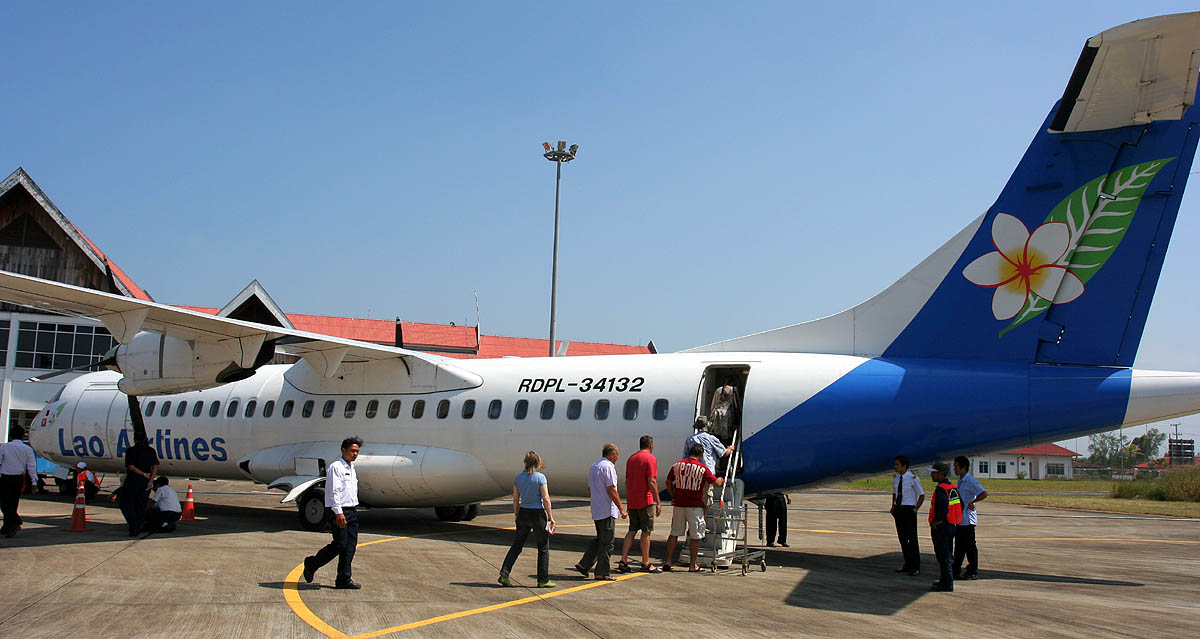
Lao Airlines ATR 72-200 (RDPL-34132) with plumeria livery at Pakse International Airport

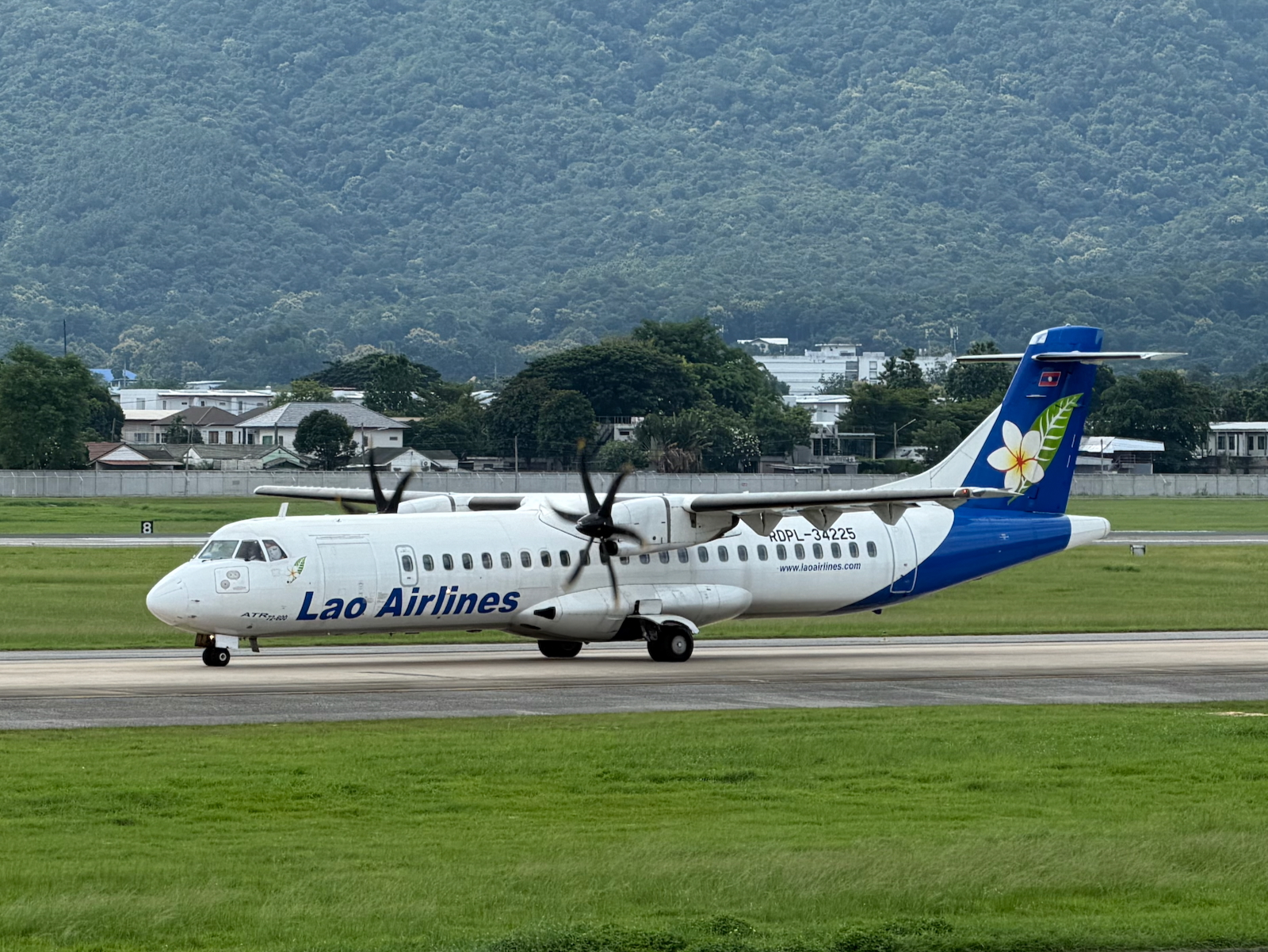
Lao Airlines ATR 72-600 at Chiang Mai International Airport

In September 1976, the company was formed from the merger of two existing airlines, Royal Air Lao and Lao Air Lines. The company became Lao Aviation in 1979. It operated a fleet of western aircraft and helicopters until re-equiping with Soviet and Chinese aircraft in the 1980s.

The airline began upgrading to ATR turboprop aircraft in the mid-1990s, and subsequently to the Airbus A320. The A320s are the first jet aircraft to be purchased by Lao Airlines and feature a two-class layout seating 126 passengers in the main cabin and 16 in Business Class, and they are powered by CFM International CFM56 engines.

In May 2025, Lao Airlines became the second airline outside China (after TransNusa of Indonesia) to commence commercial flights with the Comac C909.

== Destinations ==
As of July 2025, Lao Airlines flies (or has flown) to the following destinations:

Country	City	Airport	Notes	Refs
Cambodia	Phnom Penh	Phnom Penh International Airport	Airport closed	
Cambodia	Siem Reap	Siem Reap International Airport	Airport closed	
Cambodia	Siem Reap	Siem Reap–Angkor International Airport		
China	Changsha	Changsha Huanghua International Airport		
China	Chengdu	Chengdu Tianfu International Airport	Terminated	
China	Changzhou	Changzhou Benniu International Airport		
China	Guangzhou	Guangzhou Baiyun International Airport		
China	Hangzhou	Hangzhou Xiaoshan International Airport		
China	Kunming	Kunming Changshui International Airport		
China	Nanning	Nanning Wuxu International Airport		
China	Ningbo	Ningbo Lishe International Airport		
China	Quanzhou	Quanzhou Jinjiang International Airport		
China	Sanya	Sanya Phoenix International Airport		
China	Shanghai	Shanghai Pudong International Airport		
China	Wenzhou	Wenzhou Longwan International Airport	Terminated	
China	Zhanjiang	Zhanjiang Wuchuan International Airport		
Laos	Attapeu	Attapeu International Airport	Terminated	
Laos	Bokeo	Ban Huoeisay Airport	Terminated	
Laos	Bokeo	Bokeo International Airport		
Laos	Luang Namtha	Louang Namtha Airport		
Laos	Luang Prabang	Luang Prabang International Airport	Hub	
Laos	Muang Xay	Oudomsay Airport	Terminated	
Laos	Pakse	Pakse International Airport	Secondary hub	
Laos	Phonsavan	Xieng Khouang Airport		
Laos	Savannakhet	Savannakhet Airport		
Laos	Vientiane	Wattay International Airport	Hub	
Laos	Xam Neua	Nongkhang Airport		
South Korea	Seoul	Incheon International Airport		
Thailand	Bangkok	Don Mueang International Airport	Terminated	
Thailand	Bangkok	Suvarnabhumi Airport		
Thailand	Chiang Mai	Chiang Mai International Airport		
Vietnam	Da Nang	Da Nang International Airport		
Vietnam	Hanoi	Noi Bai International Airport		
Vietnam	Ho Chi Minh City	Tan Son Nhat International Airport		

=== Codeshare agreements ===
Lao Airlines has codeshare agreements with the following airlines:

- Bangkok Airways
- VietJet Air

=== Interline agreements ===
Lao Airlines has interline agreements with the following airlines:

- Air France
- Air Macau
- All Nippon Airways
- Asiana Airlines
- Bangkok Airways
- China Airlines
- Emirates
- Etihad Airways
- EVA Air
- Garuda Indonesia
- KLM
- Myanmar Airways International
- Qantas
- Qatar Airways
- Singapore Airlines
- SriLankan Airlines
- Thai Airways International
- Turkish Airlines
- Vietnam Airlines

== Fleet ==
As of July 2026, Lao Airlines operates the following aircraft:

Lao Airlines fleet
Aircraft	In service	Orders	Passengers			Notes
Aircraft	In service	Orders	J	Y	Total	Notes
Airbus A320-200	4	—	16	126	142	
Airbus A320-200	4	—	8	150	158	
ATR 72-500	4	—	—	70	70	
ATR 72-600	3	—	—	70	70	
Comac C909	2	—	—	90	90	
Comac C909	2	—	4	85	89	
Total	13	—				

=== Former fleet ===
As of August 2025, Lao Airlines operated 4 Airbus A320, 4 ATR 72-500, 3 ATR 72-600 and 2 Comac C909.

Lao Airlines retired fleet
Aircraft	Fleet	Introduced	Retired	Notes
Airbus A320-200	1	2003	2005	Leased
ATR 42-300	1	1994	1996	Leased
ATR 72-200	2	1996	2011	Leased
Boeing 737-200	1	1996	1998	
Xi'an MA60	4	Unknown	Unknown	Transferred to Lao Skyway.

== Livery ==
Lao Airlines aircraft feature a frangipani insignia on their vertical stabilisers. The frangipani is the official national flower of the Lao People's Democratic Republic. The words "Lao Airlines" are colored in blue.

== Accidents and incidents ==
- On 1 September 1979, a Lao Aviation Antonov An-26 (registration RDPL-34037) force-landed in a corn field at Ban Mai, Thailand, due to fuel exhaustion after the pilot became disorientated in heavy rain; all 74 passengers and crew survived, but the aircraft was substantially damaged; the aircraft was repaired and flown back to Vientiane on 31 January 1980, where it was written off after crashing on landing.
- On 22 April 1990, a Lao Aviation Antonov An-24RV (registration RDPL-34008) overshot the runway at Luang Namtha Airport after an aborted takeoff; the aircraft collided with a building, killing one; all three on the aircraft survived.
- On 13 December 1993, a Lao Aviation Harbin Y-12-II (registration RDPL-34117) crashed on approach to Phonesavanh Airport after clipping trees in fog, killing all 18 on board.
- On 25 May 1998, a Lao Aviation Yakovlev Yak-40 (registration RDPL-34001) crashed in the jungle in heavy rain near Long Tieng, Xiangkhouang Province, killing all 26 on board. The aircraft was carrying a Vietnamese military delegation from Vientiane to Xiangkhouang.
- On 19 October 2000, Lao Aviation Flight 703, a Harbin Y-12-II (registration RDPL-34130), crashed into mountainous terrain in bad weather while on approach to Sam Neua Airport en route from Vientiane; eight of 17 on board died.
- On 14 February 2002, Flight 702, a Harbin Y-12-II (registration RDPL-34118) crashed on the runway while taking off from Sam Neua Airport due to a wind gust; all 15 on board survived, but the aircraft was written off; the engines were sent to Singapore to be rebuilt, the fuselage was cut up and sent to Vietnam for scrap metal.
- On 16 October 2013, Flight 301, an ATR 72-600 (registration RDPL-34233) twin turboprop carrying 44 passengers and five crew, crashed into the Mekong River, at about 16:00 local time; all 49 on board died. The aircraft was flying from Vientiane to Pakse in Champasak Province in southern Laos, and was attempting to land in bad weather associated with Typhoon Nari.
