= Xiangkhoang =

Xiangkhouang may refer to:

- Xiangkhouang Province, Laos
- Xiangkhoang Plateau, Laos
- Xieng Khouang Airport
