= Flight 703 =

Flight 703 may refer to:

- LOT Polish Airlines Flight 703, crash-landed on 2 November 1988
- Ansett New Zealand Flight 703, crashed on 9 June 1995
- Lao Aviation Flight 703, crashed on 19 October 2000
- Saratov Airlines Flight 703, crashed on 11 February 2018
