= Nong Khang Airport =

- IATA: NEU; ICAO: VLNK

Summary
- Owner: Department of Civil Aviation (Laos)
- Location: Nong Khang, Xam Neua district, Houaphanh province
- Opened: May 2023
- Elevation AMSL: 3,566 ft / 1,087 m
- Coordinates: 20.61116°N 104.069833°E
- Interactive map of Nong Khang Airport

Runways
Direction	Length		Surface
Direction	ft	m	Surface
04/22		2,400
- https://laotiantimes.com/2023/04/20/nong-khang-airport-sees-its-first-successful-aircraft-landing/

Nong Khang is a domestic airport in Houaphanh province, Laos. Construction began in 2013 but stalled for many years due to lack of funds. Construction was completed in 2023.

35km from the provincial capital of Xam Neua, the airport is served by Lao Airlines and Lao Skyway with flights to Vientiane. It can accommodate aircraft such as the ATR 72 and Xi'an MA-60.

This airport replaces the older, smaller Nathong Airport, which was constrained in its size and liable to flight cancellations due to fog.

== Airlines and destinations ==
Airlines	Destinations
Lanexang Airways International	Vientiane
Lao Airlines	Vientiane; Charter: Luang Prabang
Lao Skyway	Vientiane
