= Lao Aviation Flight 703 =

2000 aviation accident in Laos

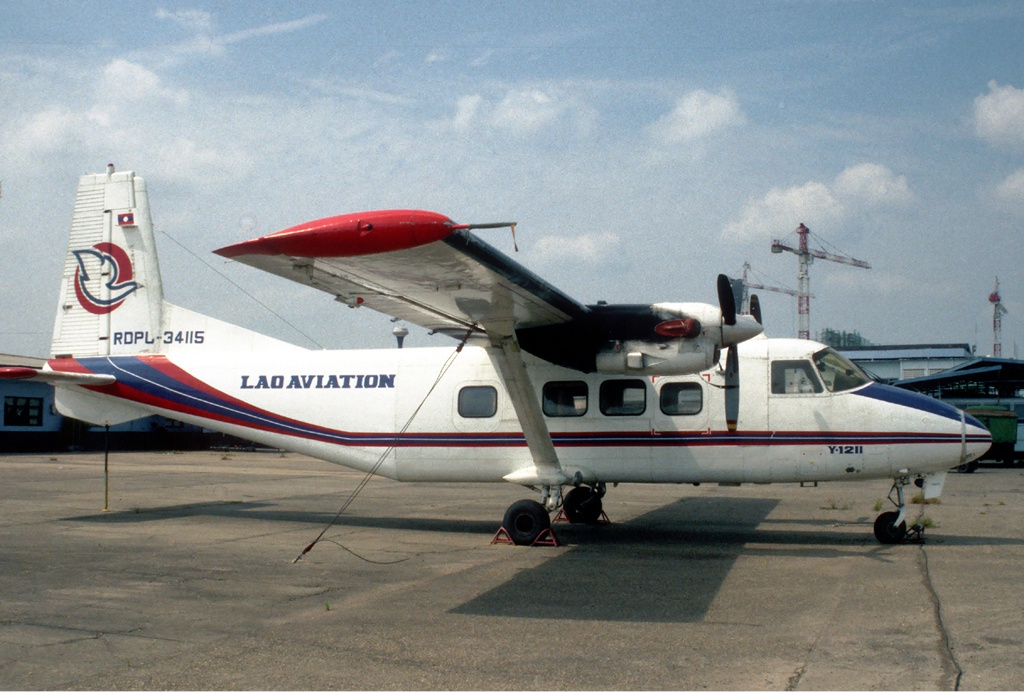
- A Lao Aviation Harbin Y-12 similar to the aircraft involved

Accident
- Date: 19 October 2000
- Summary: Controlled flight into terrain due to pilot error
- Site: 12 km from Nathong Airport, Laos

Aircraft
- Aircraft type: Harbin Y-12
- Operator: Lao Airlines
- IATA flight No.: QV703
- ICAO flight No.: LAO703
- Call sign: LAO 703
- Registration: RDPL-34130
- Flight origin: Wattay International Airport, Vientiane, Laos
- Destination: Nathong Airport, Xam Neua, Houaphan Province, Laos
- Occupants: 17
- Passengers: 15
- Crew: 2
- Fatalities: 8
- Injuries: 9
- Survivors: 9

Lao Aviation Flight 703 was a scheduled domestic passenger flight from Vientiane to Xam Neua, Laos. On 19 October 2000, the Harbin Y-12 II crashed into a mountain 12 kilometres (7.5 mi) from the airport due to pilot error. At least eight passengers died, including citizens from Germany, Singapore, and South Africa, while seven passengers and two crew members survived but were injured. The crash was the fourth fatal crash involving the airline in the previous ten years, and the second in four months.

The search for the crash site was made difficult by low cloud cover and dense smoke in the area. One group of survivors walked from the crash site to a village nearby.
