= Chom Ong =

Cave system in Laos

Coordinates: 20.682°N 101.865°E

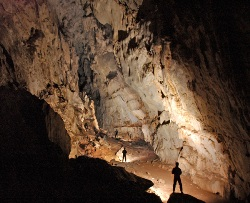
Passage in Chom Ong Cave, about 35 meters high

Chom Ong Cave is a cave system located in Oudomxay Province, in the north of Laos. Featuring a length of more of 16 km, it ranks now as the longest cave in Northern Laos and is one of the top 10 in all Laos.

== Naming ==
The villagers of Ban Chom Ong call the cave „Tam Chia“ (Lao: Bat Cave), as they traditionally hunt bats in the cave as food and exploit guano, which can be used as fertilizer, explosive agent or gunpowder. For better distinction from other caves in Laos which are called "Tham Chia". Scientist groups choose to call it by the village name, "Chom Ong".

== Location and Infrastructure ==
The cave is located about 45 km from Muang Xay, capital of Oudomxay Province, at the border of Xay District with Nam Or District. It is accessible starting from the nearby village Ban Chom Ong, which is inhabited by people of the ethnic group Khmu. The road leading from Muang Xay to Ban Chom Ong is a hilly dirt road, which makes access to the village difficult during the rainy season. During the dry season it is possible to reach the village by motorcycle or car in about two and a half hours. Starting from the village, the cave is accessible by a 45-minute walk.

== Geology ==
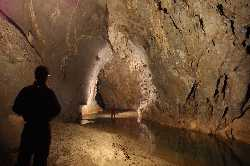
Lower level of Chom Ong Cave with Nam Khaang river flowing through it

The system stretches along a 4 km long mountain ridge and has a parallel running and interconnecting fossil and river passage. In two explorations (2009 and 2010) it was explored to a length of 16.4 km (preliminary) with several wide open side passages remaining.

The typical passage dimension is 20–25 m width and 20–30 m height. Two huge overlaying halls mark the connection of river and fossil passage with each 100 m length, 30 m width and ceiling heights of 30–50 m. The cave is a trough cave and could be entered with exploration equipment near the stream inlet in the north and left at the outflow in the south. The full traverse would take about 5 hours with additional 1 and 3 hours respectively return walking time to Chom Ong village. The cave was pushed at the last day in a 15-hour trip to its current length.

The upper level of the cave leads to several about 15 meter high "balconies", from where it is possible to look down to a lower level, where the Nam Kaang river flows. Chom Ong Cave features especially impressive stalagmites and stalactites, as well as large sparkling sinter formations.

== History ==
In 2006, the Tourism Department of Oudomxay found out about the existence of the cave, while looking for potential touristic interesting sights in the Province. However, villagers of Ban Chom Ong knew about it since generations before, using its most accessible areas for hunting bats, fishing and exploiting guano.

Since then, measures were taken to prepare the village for a creation of value of the cave, in line with ecotourism. In order to reduce poverty, the village was thought to be involved in a large scale to benefit from the revenue. Supported by German Development Service, workshops as tour-guiding and cooking trainings were arranged and a tourist guesthouse for overnight stays was built.

In January 2009, an international group of scientists of the Northern Lao - European Cave Project measured the first part of the cave and calculated a preliminary length of 13,5 km. Supported by the Schmitz Foundation, toilet and bathroom facilities for the villagers were installed, as well as ceramic filters supplying clean drinking water. The first 450 m of the cave were equipped with illumination. In January 2010, research on Chom Ong cave continued. After completion of the measurements the cave, its length is assumed to be about 16,4 km. In the same month, an information board was installed in front of the cave entrance and the cave was opened for tourists for the first time.
