= Bokeo International Airport =

Airport in Laos

Bokeo International Airport ສະໜາມບິນສາກົນບໍ່ແກ້ວ 博胶国际机场
- IATA: BOR; ICAO: VLBK

Summary
- Airport type: Public
- Operator: Greater Bay Area Homeland Investments Limited
- Serves: Bokeo Province
- Location: Golden Triangle Special Economic Zone
- Opened: February 2024; 2 years ago
- Elevation AMSL: 1,175 ft (358 m)
- Coordinates: 20°19′26″N 100°09′56″E

Map
- Location of airport in Laos

Runways
Direction	Length		Surface
Direction	ft	m	Surface
03/21	8,858	2,700	Asphalt

Bokeo International Airport (IATA: BOR, ICAO: VLBK) is a domestic airport (despite its name) in Laos. The airport is located in the Ton Pheung district, Golden Triangle Special Economic Zone of Bokeo Province in Northern Laos and was opened in February 2024 after three years of construction.

== Description ==
Construction of the airport began in September 2020 and finished in February 2024. Its terminal can accommodate 600 people and is anticipated to handle up to 2 million passengers each year when fully operational. The airport officially opened in a ceremony led by deputy prime minister Saleumxay Kommasith.

With an area of 314 hectares and 5,478 square meters, the airport is the third largest airport in Laos after Wattay International Airport and Luang Prabang International Airport and has a 2,700 meter runway which can be extended up to 3,000 meters.

== Airlines and destinations ==
=== Passenger ===
Airlines	Destinations
Lao Airlines	Vientiane
