= Sikhottabong district =

Sikhottabong district ສີໂຄດຕະບອງ Sikhottabong
- District
- Wattay Airport in 2009

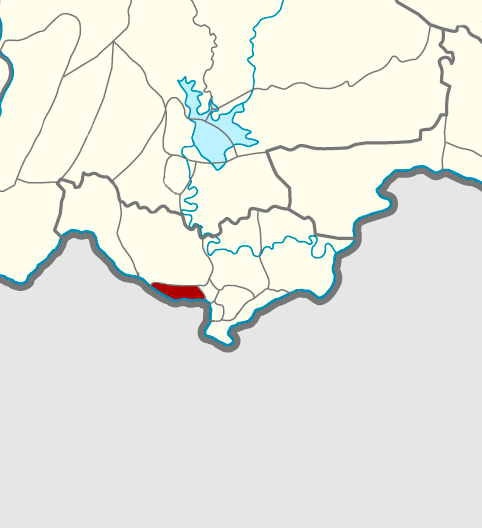
- District location in Vientiane Prefecture
- Coordinates: 17°58′13″N 102°34′25″E
- Country: Laos
- Province: Vientiane Prefecture
- District: Sikhottabong

Government
  - District Governor: Thavixay Maosomphou

Population (2020)
  - Total: 138,655
- Time zone: UTC+7 (ICT)

Sikhottabong (Lao: ເມືອງສີໂຄດຕະບອງ, pronounced [mɯ́aŋ sǐː kʰôːt.tā.bɔ̀ːŋ]) is a district of Vientiane Prefecture, Laos. With the population of 138,655 in 2020, the district contains Wattay International Airport, the busiest airport in Laos which began its operations in 1999. The area has also seen significant investment from Japan as a result of the airport.

== History ==
Wattay International Airport began operations in the district in 1999. The airport would see further expansions in 2005, 2011-2012, and 2015-2018 funded in part by the Japanese Government.

During an attempted robbery in the district, a Chinese citizen was shot and killed. Lao authorities were then urged by the Embassy of China in Vientiane to arrest the couple who shot him. From 6-7 August 2022, areas of the district experienced heavy rains and were subsequently flooded, affecting 25 villages and 839 families. On 10 August 2022, the mayor of Vientiane, Atsaphangthong Siphandone, and the District Governor, Thavixay Maosomphou, visited Nongniao and Nong Teng which were both affected by the floods.

== Villages ==
Sikhottabong consisted of 54 villages as follow:

- Ban Na Kham
- Ban Oop Moong
- Ban Nong Pla Nai
- Ban Wattay Noi Tha
- Ban Wattay Noi Toong
- Ban Nong Sano Kham
- Ban Wattay Yai Tha
- Ban Awakat
- Ban Mueang Wa Thung
- Ban Si Kai Tha
- Ban Si Kai Thung Tai
- Ban Si Kai Thung Nuea
- Ban Ya Pha
- Ban Si Bun Rueang Tha
- Ban Si Bun RUeang Thung
- Ban Si Chom Chuen
- Ban Non Sawang
- Ban Ao Leao
- Ban Dan Kham
- Ban Non Ki Hek
- Ban Non Keaw
- Ban Phon Sawat Nuea
- Ban Phon Sombun
- Ban That Thong
- Ban Nong Da
- Ban Mai
- Ban Huai Hom
- Ban Ang
- Ban Pho Si
- Ban Na Rae
- Ban Vieng Sawan
- Ban Thung Pong
- Ban Na Lao
- Ban Nong Neao
- Ban Nong Taeng Tai
- Ban Nong Taeng Nuea
- Ban Pak Tang
- Ban Dong Na Thong
- Ban Lak Hin
- Ban Nong Buek Tai
- Ban Nong Buek Nuea
- Bang Da-ngok Lao
- Ban Cham Khet
- Ban Khun Ta Thung
- Ban Khun Ta Tha
- Ban Sri Tan Nuea
- Ban Nong Duang Nuea
- Ban Nong Duang Tai
- Ban Nong Duang Thung
- Ban Phon Sawat Tai
- Ban Nong Bua Thong Nuea
- Ban Phon Kham
- Ban Chan Sawang
- Ban Don Ching Chu
