= Louang Namtha Airport =

Airport in Laos

Louangnamtha Airport ສະຫນາມບິນຫລວງນໍ້າທາ
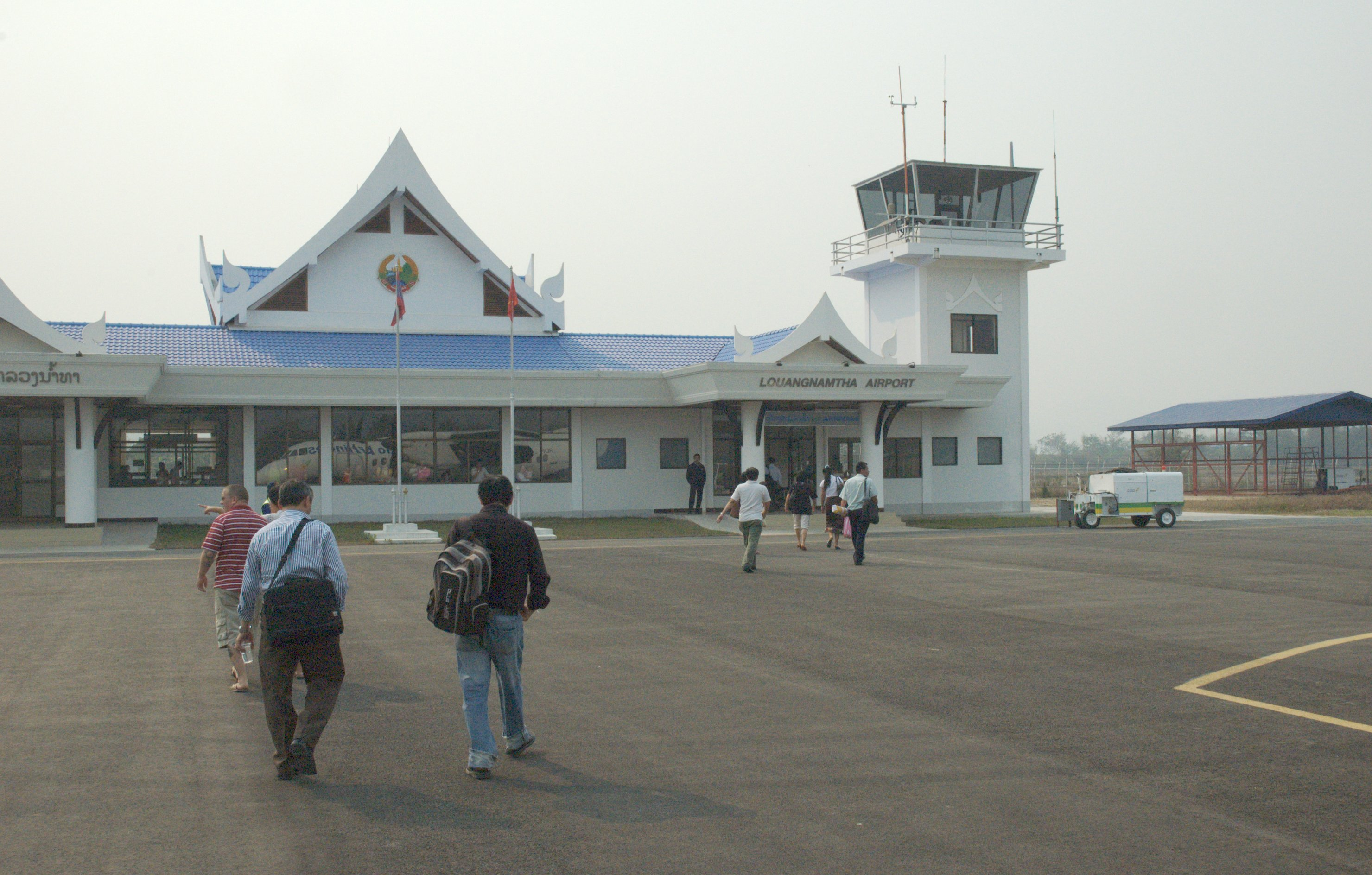
- IATA: LXG; ICAO: VLLN

Summary
- Airport type: Public/Civil Aviation Authority
- Operator: Laos Civil Aviation Authority
- Elevation AMSL: 600 m / 1,968 ft
- Coordinates: 20°57′38″N 101°24′09″E

Map
- Location of airport in Laos

Runways
| Direction | Length | | Surface |
| Direction | ft | m | Surface |
|---|---|---|---|
| 18/36 | 5,249 | 1,600 | Asphalt |

Louangnamtha Airport (IATA: LXG, ICAO: VLLN) is an airport in Laos, 6 km south of the city of Luang Namtha. The airport was closed between 2006 and 2008 for a renovation that extended the runway from 1,200 to 1,600 metres, allowing larger aircraft such as the ATR 72 to use the airport, and built a new 700 m^{2} passenger terminal.

== Airlines and destinations ==
| Airlines | Destinations |
|---|---|
| Lao Airlines | Vientiane |
| Lao Skyway | Vientiane |
