= Oudomsay Airport =

Airport in Muang Xay, Laos

Oudomsay Airport ສະຫນາມບິນອຸດົມໄຊ
- IATA: ODY; ICAO: VLOS

Summary
- Airport type: Public
- Location: Muang Xay
- Elevation AMSL: 1,804 ft / 550 m
- Coordinates: 20°40′55.2″N 101°59′35.16″E

Map
- Location of airport in Laos

Runways
Direction	Length		Surface
Direction	ft	m	Surface
02/20	5,250	1,600	Concrete

Oudomsay Airport (or Oudomxay Airport) is an airport in Muang Xay, Laos (IATA: ODY, ICAO: VLOS).

== Airlines and destinations ==
Airlines	Destinations
Lao Airlines	Vientiane
Lao Skyway	Vientiane
