= Pakse International Airport =

Airport in Pakse, Laos

Pakse International Airport ສະຫນາມບິນສາກົນປາກເຊ
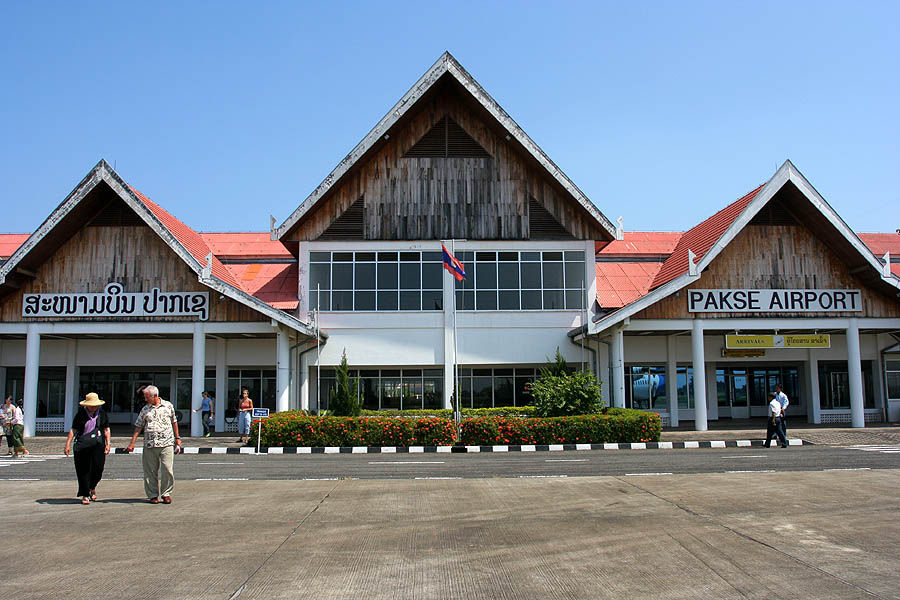
- IATA: PKZ; ICAO: VLPS

Summary
- Airport type: Public / Military
- Owner: Civil Aviation Authority
- Operator: Military of Laos
- Location: Pakse, Champasak
- Opened: 1959; 67 years ago
- Focus city for: Lao Airlines
- Elevation AMSL: 351 ft (107 m)
- Coordinates: 15°08′02″N 105°46′55″E

Map
- Location of airport in Laos

Runways
Direction	Length		Surface
Direction	ft	m	Surface
15/33	7,874	2,400	Asphalt

Pakse International Airport (IATA: PKZ, ICAO: VLPS) is one of the three international airports in Laos. Pakse is the former southern capital city of the Kingdom of Champasak.

== Facilities ==
The airport has been in use since 1959 and re-opened after renovations in 2001. A new control tower next to the terminal replaced a short one to provide ATC at the airport. The terminal is designed to mimic the Lan Xang-style architecture used for Buddhist temples in Laos.

Though civilian, the airfield is also used by the military. Lao People's Army barracks and the headquarters of Military Region 4 are next to the airport. The airport is a military airfield for Lao People's Liberation Army Air Force aircraft as a detachment base.

== Airlines and destinations ==
Airlines	Destinations
Lao Airlines	Guangzhou, Ho Chi Minh City, Luang Prabang, Siem Reap, Vientiane
Lao Skyway	Vientiane

== Accidents and incidents ==
- On 16 October 2013, Lao Airlines Flight 301, operated by an ATR 72–600 crashed into the Mekong River shortly after an aborted landing at Pakse, killing all 49 people on board. It was later determined that the causes of the crash included pilot error and poor weather caused by the remnants of Typhoon Nari that were affecting Southern Laos.
