= Ton Pheung district =

Ton Pheung district ເມືອງຕົ້ນເຜິ້ງ
- District
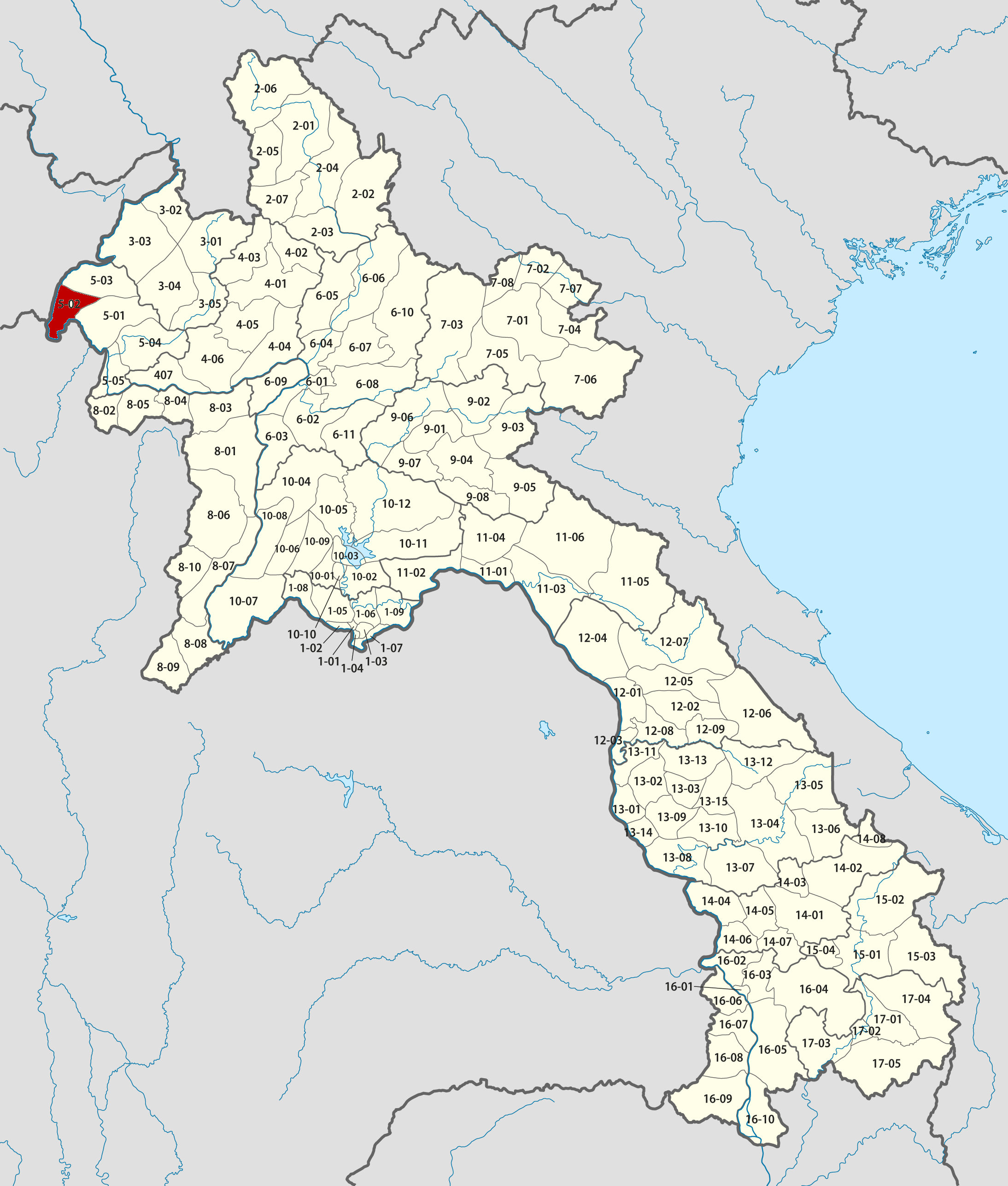
- Location in Laos
- Country: Laos
- Province: Bokeo province

Population (2015)
  - District: 34,476
  - Urban: 15,023
- Time zone: UTC+7 (ICT)

Ton Pheung (Lao: ຕົ້ນເຜິ້ງ, pronounced [tôn pɤ̏ŋ]; Thai and Northeastern Thai: ต้นผึ้ง) is a district (muang) of Bokeo province in northwestern Laos. The district lies in northwest Laos and borders Tachileik district of Burma and Chiang Saen district and Chiang Khong district of Chiang Rai province, Thailand. In addition, The district is the location of the Golden Triangle Special Economic Zone.

== History ==
Given its location, the district has been the center of much conflict in the past. A dispute broke out in 1999 over Thai farmers cultivating on district lands and on 25 February 2008 an attack broke out on the Burmese border involving Burmese drug lords.

== Economy ==
The district economy and also that of Bokeo Province is now dominated by the Golden Triangle Special Economic Zone (GT SEZ) in Ton Pheung District. In 2007, Kings Romans Group, owned by well-connected Chinese husband and wife Zhao Wei and Su Guiqin, entered into a 99-year lease for 10,000 hectares on the banks of the Mekong. The company was granted 3,000 of these hectares as a duty-free zone, now the SEZ. As gambling is illegal in China, and the SEZ is only a two-hour journey by road from China, casinos and hotels catering to a Chinese clientele were built. A robust industry involving trafficking in endangered animals has grown up around the Chinese tourist trade. In January 2018, the US Treasury Department announced sanctions against what it called Zhao's transnational criminal organisation, engaging in illicit activities, including human trafficking and child prostitution, drug trafficking and wildlife trafficking.

== Settlements ==
- Ban Aychai
- Ban Ayseng
- Ban Bo-Mai
- Ban Chaboti
- Ban Chacho
- Ban Chado
- Ban Chaibo
- Ban Chakham
- Ban Chakhu
- Ban Chalo
- Ban Chap
- Ban Chauva
- Ban Ghapa
- Ban Hali Tia
- Ban Ho
- Ban Houapo
- Ban Houayboulao
- Ban Houaynamnga
- Ban Kang
- Ban Kokka
- Ban Koung
- Ban Kouy
- Ban Kouychakhu
- Ban Lohi
- Ban Mai
- Ban Mai-Muangkhon
- Ban Meo Noua Nam Lave
- Ban Meung
- Ban Meung Hong
- Ban Muanghoung
- Ban Muangkang-Nua
- Ban Namhoy

- Ban Namkhali
- Ban Namkhayao
- Ban Namlem
- Ban Nong Kha
- Ban Oko
- Ban Pan Po Boung
- Ban Paxot
- Ban Pbangoua
- Ban Phagnalouaogkhamping
- Ban Phangoua
- Ban Phoulao
- Ban Sen
- Ban Senphonuang
- Ban Sen Po Meung
- Ban Ta Hou
- Ban Taxoum-Mai
- Ban Thakate
- Ban Tolo
- Ban Tongpalang
- Ban Tongpot
- Ban Xang
- Ban Xiang
- Ban Xiangkheng
- Khas Khouis
- Mugne

== Transport ==
=== Air ===
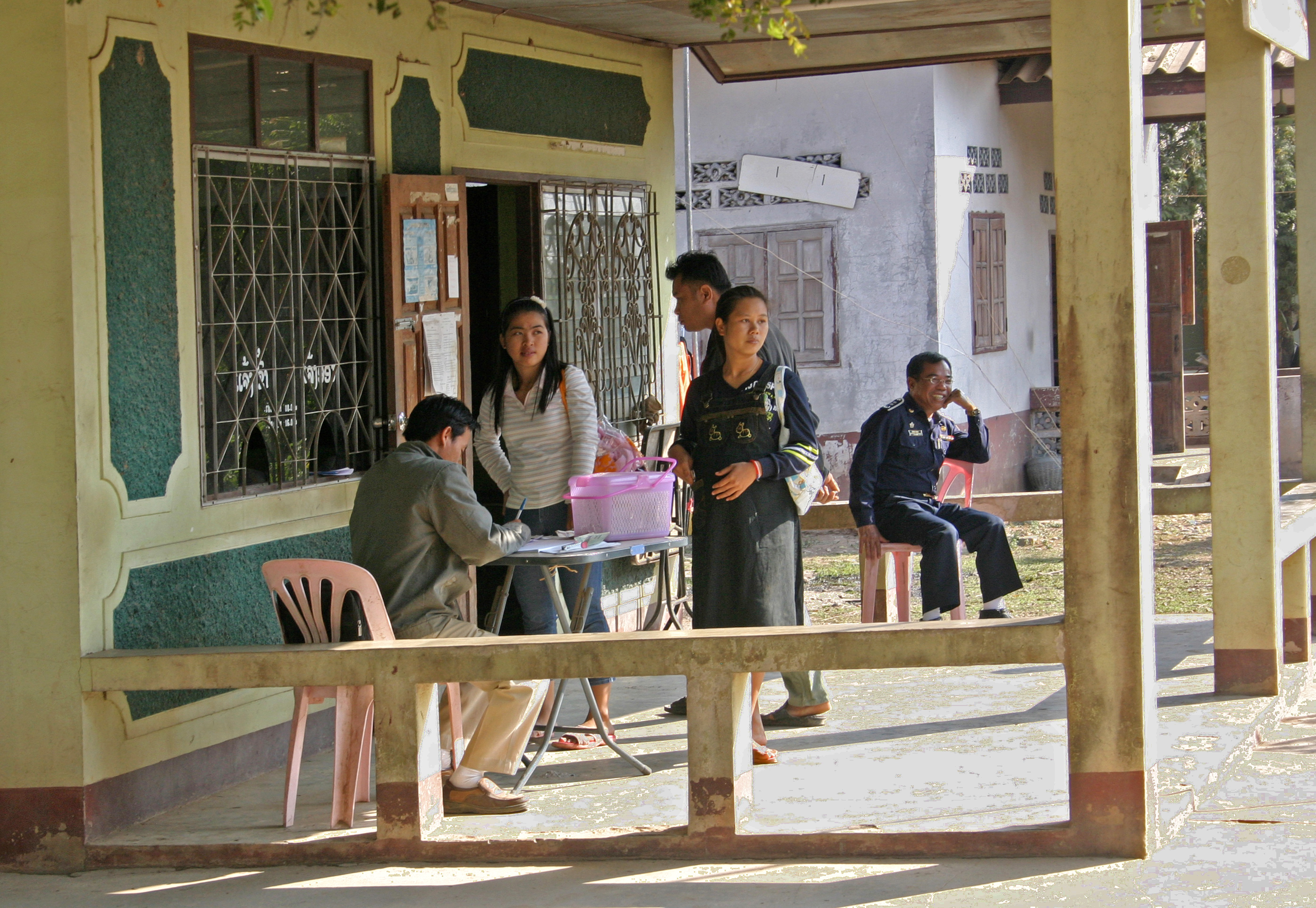
Border checkpoint

Bokeo International Airport

Bokeo International Airport, which serves international flights in Bokeo province, opened on February 5, 2024
