= Attapeu International Airport =

Military airport in Laos

Attapeu International Airport ສະຫນາມບິນສາກົນອັດຕະປື
- IATA: AOU; ICAO: VLAP

Summary
- Airport type: Military
- Owner: Lao Air Force
- Serves: Attapeu
- Location: Saysetha District, Laos
- Opened: 30 May 2015; 11 years ago
- Closed: January 2017; 9 years ago
- Passenger services ceased: October 2016; 9 years ago
- Elevation AMSL: 105 m (344 ft)
- Coordinates: 14°47′35″N 107°02′43″E

Map
- Location in Laos

Runways
Direction	Length		Surface
Direction	m	ft	Surface
11/29	1,850	6,070	Asphalt
- Source: Great Circle Mapper

Attapeu International Airport (IATA: AOU, ICAO: VLAP) was an international airport that served Attapeu in Laos. It opened in May 2015 following two years of construction. Lao Airlines provided flights from Vientiane via Pakse three times a week; however, it stopped them in October 2016 because of low passenger demand. The airport was officially closed in 2017. Attapeu Province has a small population (140,000) and does not receive much tourism, which have been cited as factors in the airport's closure. In 2022, the airport was handed over to the Lao People's Liberation Air Force.

== History ==
On 11 February 2012, officials of the Lao and Vietnamese governments attended the groundbreaking ceremony for the airport, which is located near the Lao–Vietnamese border. Construction began in May 2013 and ended in April 2015. Vietnam's Hoang Anh Gia Lai Group provided a loan of almost 300 billion kip (more than US$36.1 million) for the construction of the airport. The Attapeu airport officially opened on 30 May 2015 as the first international facility in the province.

In June 2015, TTR Weekly reported that neither of the two airlines providing domestic flights in Laos, Lao Airlines and Lao Skyway, had shown interest in serving Attapeu. Lao Airlines had conducted a year-long survey but found little interest. Although Attapeu Province has seen increased economic activity in the sectors of power production, mining, and timber, because of its proximity to Vietnam, however has few tourist attractions.

Nevertheless, Lao Airlines introduced twice-weekly flights from Vientiane via Pakse on 9 April 2016. The frequency was increased to thrice-weekly in July. However, Lao Airlines ended the route in October 2016 because of low passenger numbers. The following January, authorities closed down the airport.

== Infrastructure ==
The Attapeu airport has one runway that measures 1,850 by 30 metres (6,070 ft × 98 ft). The 4,300-square-metre (46,000 sq ft) terminal was built to handle 300 passengers per day.

== Access ==
The airport is located along Route 18B in Saysetha District, roughly 28 kilometres (17 mi) from Attapeu.
