= Savannakhet Airport =

Airport in Savannakhet, Laos

Savannakhet Airport ສະຫນາມບິນສະຫວັນນະເຂດ
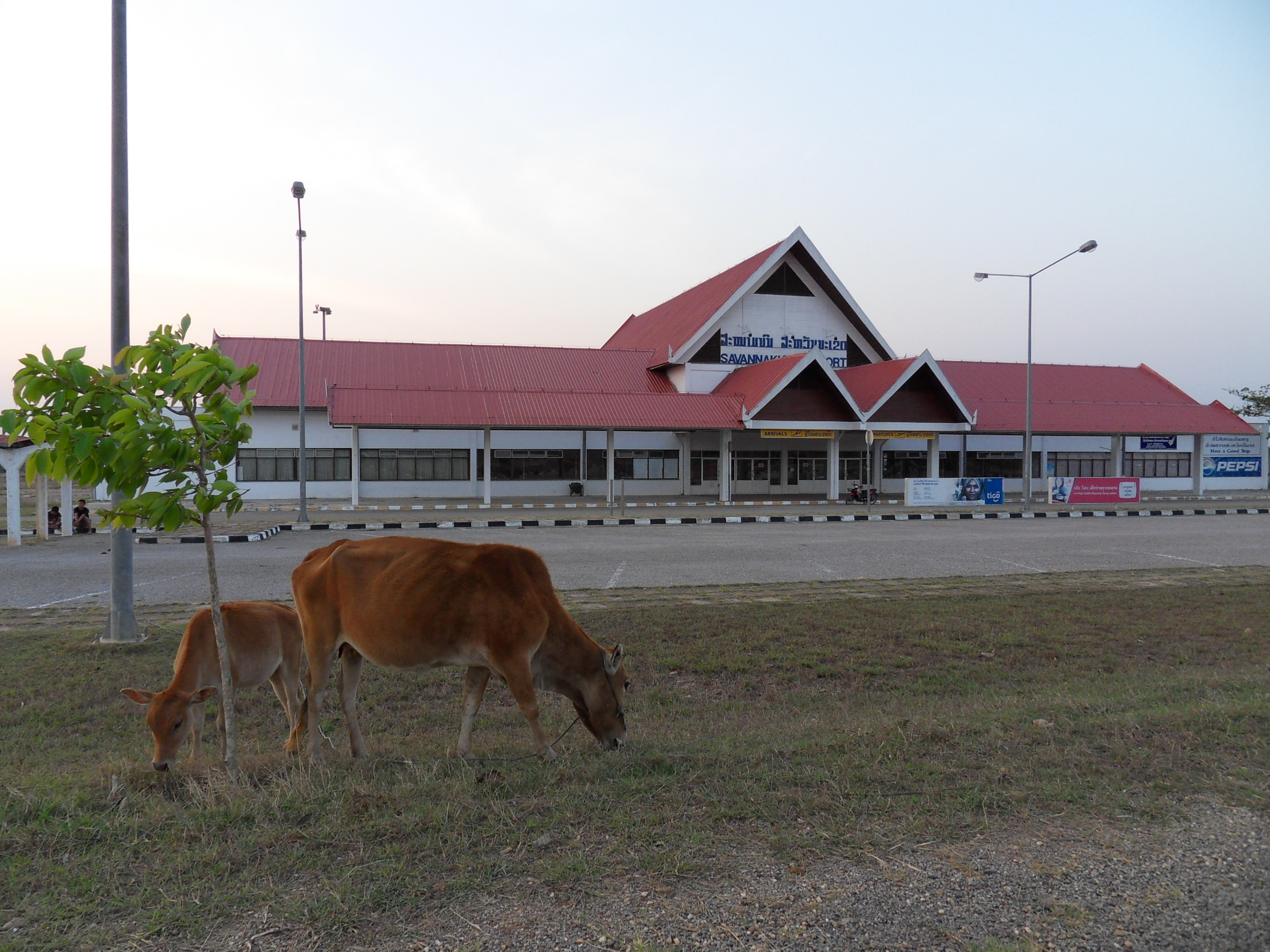
- Savannakhet Airport (2010)
- IATA: ZVK; ICAO: VLSK

Summary
- Airport type: Public
- Location: Savannakhet
- Elevation AMSL: 509 ft / 155 m
- Coordinates: 16°33′24″N 104°45′34″E

Map
- Location of airport in Laos

Runways
Direction	Length		Surface
Direction	ft	m	Surface
04/22	5,358	1,633	Concrete

Savannakhet Airport (IATA: ZVK, ICAO: VLSK) is an international airport near Savannakhet, Laos.

== Overview ==
The US military has also been known to use this airport with C-130 Hercules airplanes supporting teams engaged in searching for remains of servicemen declared MIA in the Vietnam War.

== Airlines and destinations ==
Airlines	Destinations
Lao Airlines	Vientiane
Lao Skyway	Vientiane
