= Ban Huoeisay Airport =

Ban Huoeisay Airport ສະໜາມບິນຫ້ວຍຊາຍ
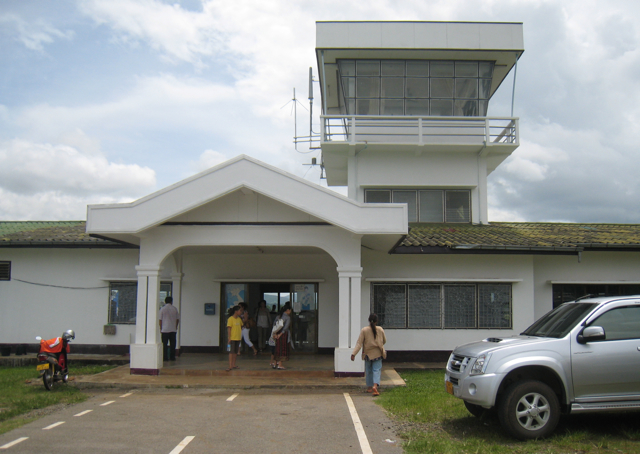
- IATA: HOE; ICAO: VLHS

Summary
- Operator: Civil Government
- Location: Ban Houayxay, Laos
- Elevation AMSL: 1,380 ft / 421 m
- Coordinates: 20°15′28″N 100°26′13″E

Map
- Location of airport in Laos

Runways
| Direction | Length | | Surface |
| Direction | ft | m | Surface |
|---|---|---|---|
| 16/34 | 4,830 | 1,472 | Asphalt |
- Sources: World Aero Data (WAD); Great Circle Mapper (GCM); Aviation Safety Network (ASN)

Ban Huoeisay Airport (Lao: ສະໜາມບິນຫ້ວຍຊາຍ) (IATA: HOE, ICAO: VLHS) is an airport in Ban Houayxay, Laos. Alternative spellings are Ban Houayxay Airport, Ban Houei Sai Airport and Ban Huay Xai Airport.

== Airlines and destinations ==
There are no scheduled flights to Ban Huoeisay Airport due to a runway upgrade.

== Accidents and incidents ==
- On 30 June 1971, Douglas C-47B XW-TDI of Royal Air Lao was written off in an accident at Ban Huoeisay Airport.
