= Sayaboury Airport =

- IATA: ZBY; ICAO: VLSB

Summary
- Airport type: Public/Civil Aviation Authority
- Location: Sainyabuli, Laos
- Coordinates: 19°14′37″N 101°42′34″E

Map
- Location of airport in Laos

Runways
| Direction | Length | | Surface |
| Direction | ft | m | Surface |
|---|---|---|---|
| 16/34 | 3,254 | 992 | Asphalt |

Sayaboury Airport (IATA: ZBY, ICAO: VLSB) is an airport in Sainyabuli, the capital of Sainyabuli Province of Laos.

It is the closest airport to Wattay International Airport in the Laotian capital of Vientiane.

== Airlines and destinations ==
| Airlines | Destinations |
|---|---|
| Lao Skyway | Vientiane |
