= Wattay International Airport =

Airport serving Vientiane, Laos

Wattay International Airport ສະໜາມບິນສາກົນວັດໄຕ
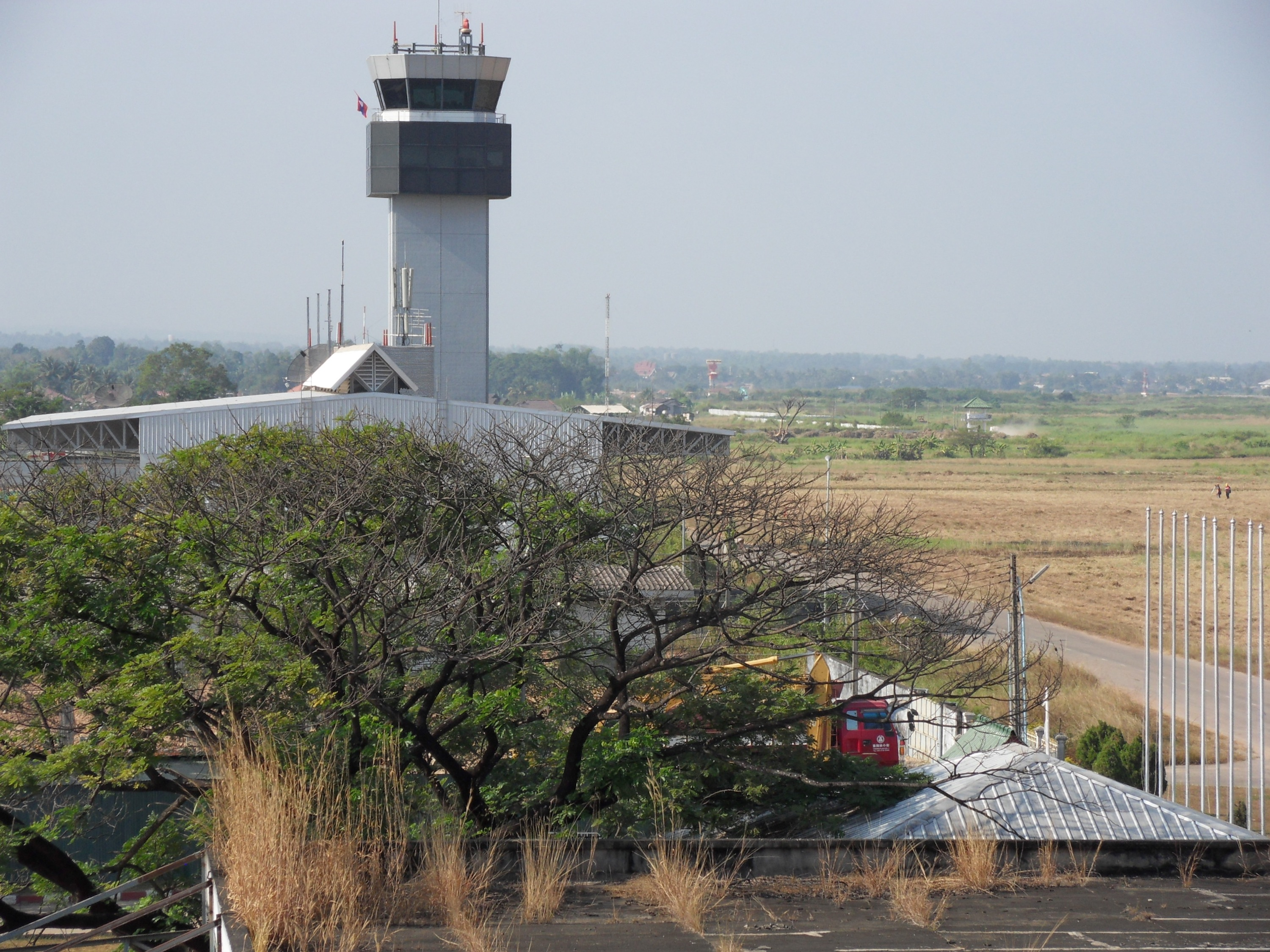
- IATA: VTE; ICAO: VLVT

Summary
- Airport type: Public / military
- Operator: Lao People's Armed Forces
- Serves: Vientiane
- Location: Sikhottabong district, Vientiane Prefecture, Laos
- Opened: 1930; 96 years ago
- Hub for: Lanexang Airways International; Lao Airlines; Lao Skyway
- Elevation AMSL: 564 ft (172 m)
- Coordinates: 17°59′18″N 102°33′48″E

Map
- Location of airport in Laos

Runways
Direction	Length		Surface
Direction	ft	m	Surface
13/31	9,843	3,000	Asphalt

Statistics (2012)
- Passenger movements: ?
- Airfreight movements in tonnes: ?
- Aircraft movements: ?

Wattay International Airport (Lao: ສະໜາມບິນສາກົນວັດໄຕ) (IATA: VTE, ICAO: VLVT) is an international airport in Laos, the country's main international gateway, serving the capital Vientiane, located 3 km (1.9 mi) outside of the city centre in Sikhottabong district, Vientiane Prefecture. The airport is operated by the Lao Airport Authority (LAA) and serves as a hub for Lao Skyway, Lanexang Airways International, and Lao Airlines. The Lao Air Force also operates an installation at one end of the airport.

The head offices of the Department of Civil Aviation and Lao Air are on the airport property. The 45 metre wide and 3000 metre long single runway is capable of handling aircraft as large as the Boeing 747-400.

== History ==
Wattay International Airport terminal building

Wattay International Airport began operations in 1999. Using grant money from the Japanese government, the airport renovated its international terminal in 2005. The cargo terminal was built in 2011 by the Lao-Japan Airport Terminal Building Service with ₭9.6 billion of funding from the Bank of Japan.

In July 2011, the Ministry of Public Works and Transport initiated a new expansion project in association with China CAMC Engineering Company. The project saw the elongation of the single asphalt runway by 260 meters to 3,000 metres; development of parking lots; renovation of its road and drainage system; expansion of two aprons to accommodate larger aircraft; and the construction of new offices for the LAA and Lao Civil Aviation Department. Japan provided ¥1.9 billion in funding to the project through the Japan International Cooperation Agency, making up two-thirds of the total cost of ₭302 billion. The project began in December 2011 and was completed in November 2012. In February 2012, $3 million was provided by the Bouathip Lao Company to expand the domestic terminal.

In December 2015, the airport launched another expansion project, completed in August 2018. The project saw the expansion of the international terminal, the construction of a new domestic terminal, and the improvement of several facilities. The project was again funded by the Japan International Cooperation Agency, contributing a ¥9 billion loan.

== Airlines and destinations ==
Airlines	Destinations
9 Air	Guangzhou, Haikou, Wuxi, Wenzhou, Xi'an
Air Busan	Busan, Seoul–Incheon
AirAsia	Kuala Lumpur–International
Cambodia Airways	Phnom Penh
China Eastern Airlines	Kunming, Shanghai–Pudong, Wuhan
China Express Airlines	Chongqing
China Southern Airlines	Guangzhou
China United Airlines	Beijing–Daxing, Ordos, Wenzhou
GX Airlines	Jinan, Nanning
Hainan Airlines	Haikou
Hong Kong Airlines	Hong Kong
Jeju Air	Seoul−Incheon; Seasonal: Muan
Jin Air	Seasonal: Seoul–Incheon
Juneyao Air	Lanzhou, Xi'an
Lanexang Airways International	Bokeo, Luang Prabang, Xiangkhoang
Lao Airlines	Bangkok–Suvarnabhumi, Bokeo, Changsha, Changzhou, Chengdu–Tianfu, Cheongju, Guangzhou, Da Nang, Hangzhou, Hanoi, Ho Chi Minh City, Kunming, Luang Namtha, Luang Prabang, Nanning, Ningbo, Oudomxay, Pakse, Quanzhou, Sanya, Savannakhet, Seoul–Incheon, Shanghai–Pudong, Wenzhou, Xam Neua, Xiangkhoang
Lao Skyway	Bokeo, Luang Namtha, Luang Prabang, Oudomxay, Pakse, Phongsali, Savannakhet, Sayaboury, Xam Neua, Xepon, Xiangkhoang
Lucky Air	Kunming
Myanmar Airways International	Yangon
Qingdao Airlines	Xishuangbanna
Scoot	Singapore
Sichuan Airlines	Chengdu–Tianfu, Kunming
Thai AirAsia	Bangkok–Don Mueang
Thai Airways International	Bangkok–Suvarnabhumi
Trinity Airways	Busan, Seoul–Incheon; Seasonal: Daegu
VietJet Air	Ho Chi Minh City
Vietnam Airlines	Hanoi, Ho Chi Minh City, Phnom Penh
West Air	Changsha, Chongqing
XiamenAir	Beijing–Daxing, Fuzhou

== Facilities ==
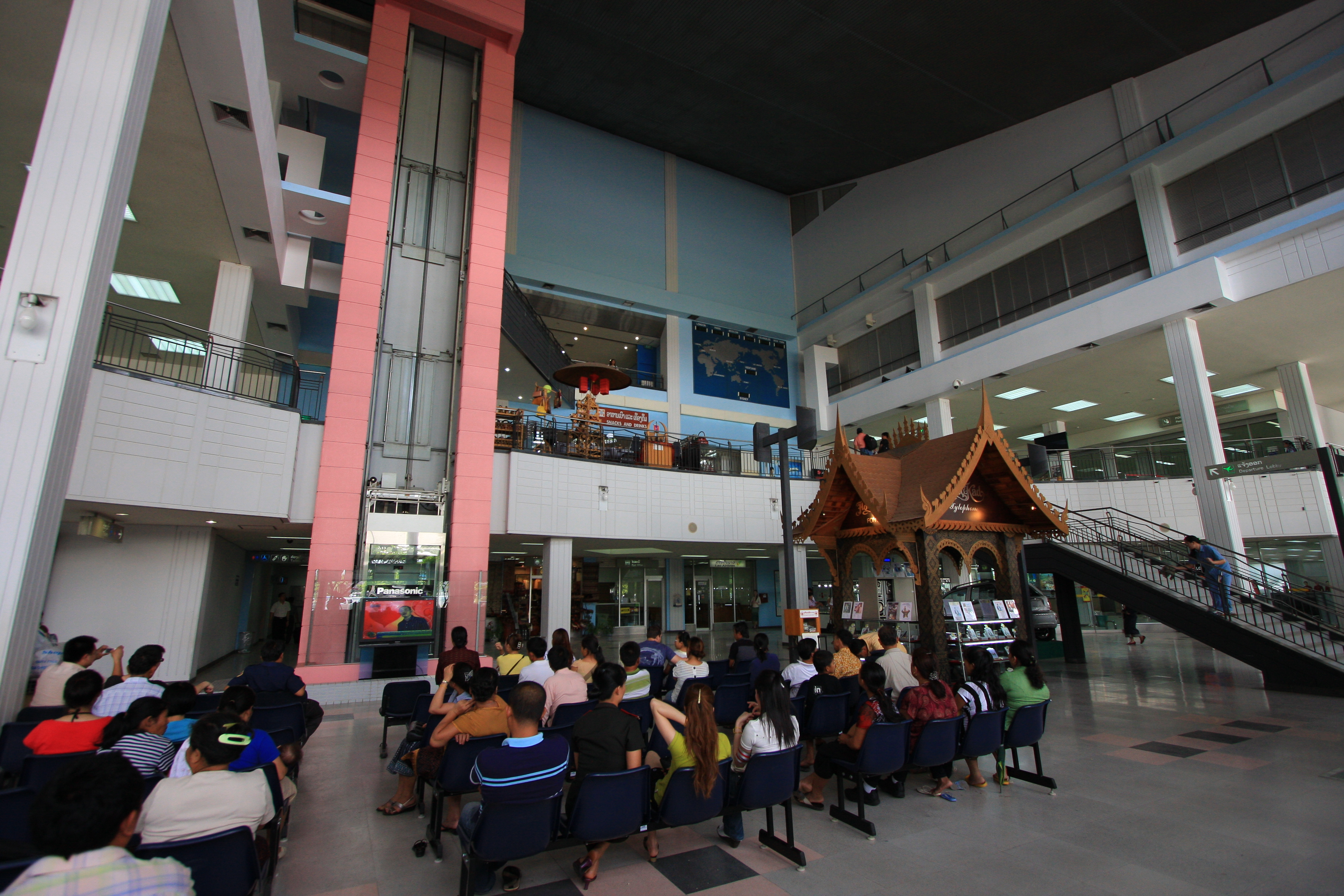
The interior of Wattay Airport in Vientiane

The airport has a bonded warehouse building for air cargo passing through the airport. The facility is operated by Lao-Japan Airport Terminal Building Service Co. Ltd.

== Ground transportation ==
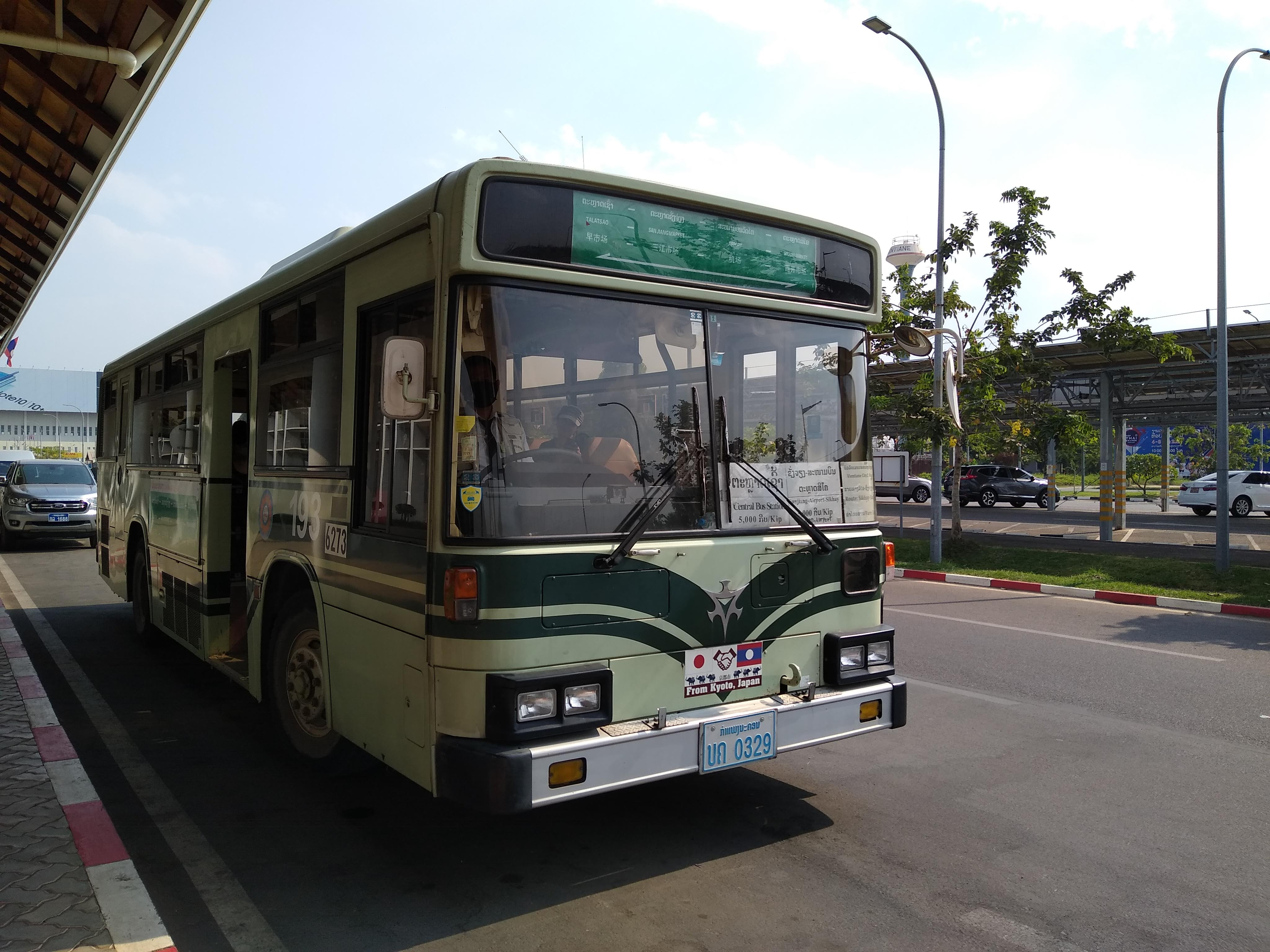
An airport shuttle bus

The airport can be accessed by shuttle bus, taxi, car, tuk-tuk and on foot. The shuttle bus stop is located outside the international terminal.
