= Xieng Khouang Airport =

Xieng Khouang Airport ສະຫນາມບິນຊຽງຂວາງ
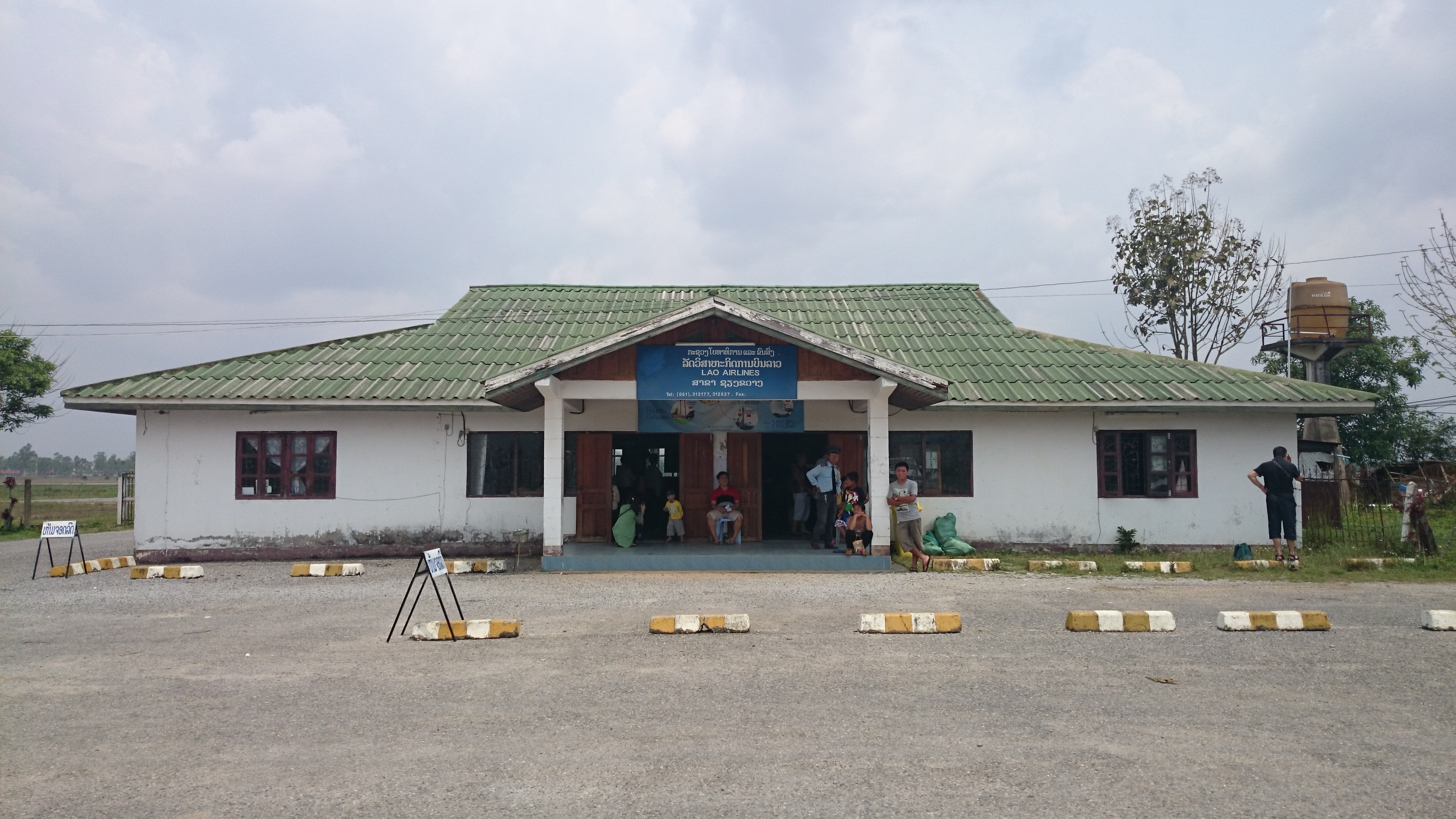
- IATA: XKH; ICAO: VLXK

Summary
- Operator: Civil Government
- Location: Phonsavan, Laos
- Coordinates: 19°26′24.54″N 103°10′6.24″E

Map
- Location of airport in Laos

Runways
Direction	Length		Surface
Direction	ft	m	Surface
07/25	(8,100)	(2,480)	Asphalt
- Source: World Aero Data

Xieng Khouang Airport is an airport in Phonsavan, Laos (IATA: XKH, ICAO: VLXK).

Its name is derived from the Xiangkhoang Plateau, which gives name to the Xiangkhouang Province on which it is located. It is the main access gateway for tourists visiting the nearby Plain of Jars.

== Airlines and destinations ==
Airlines	Destinations
Lao Airlines	Vientiane
Lao Skyway	Vientiane
Lanexang Airways International	Vientiane
