= Sainyabuli =

Sainyabuli ເມືອງໄຊຍະບູລີ
- District & municipality
- Sainyabuli District
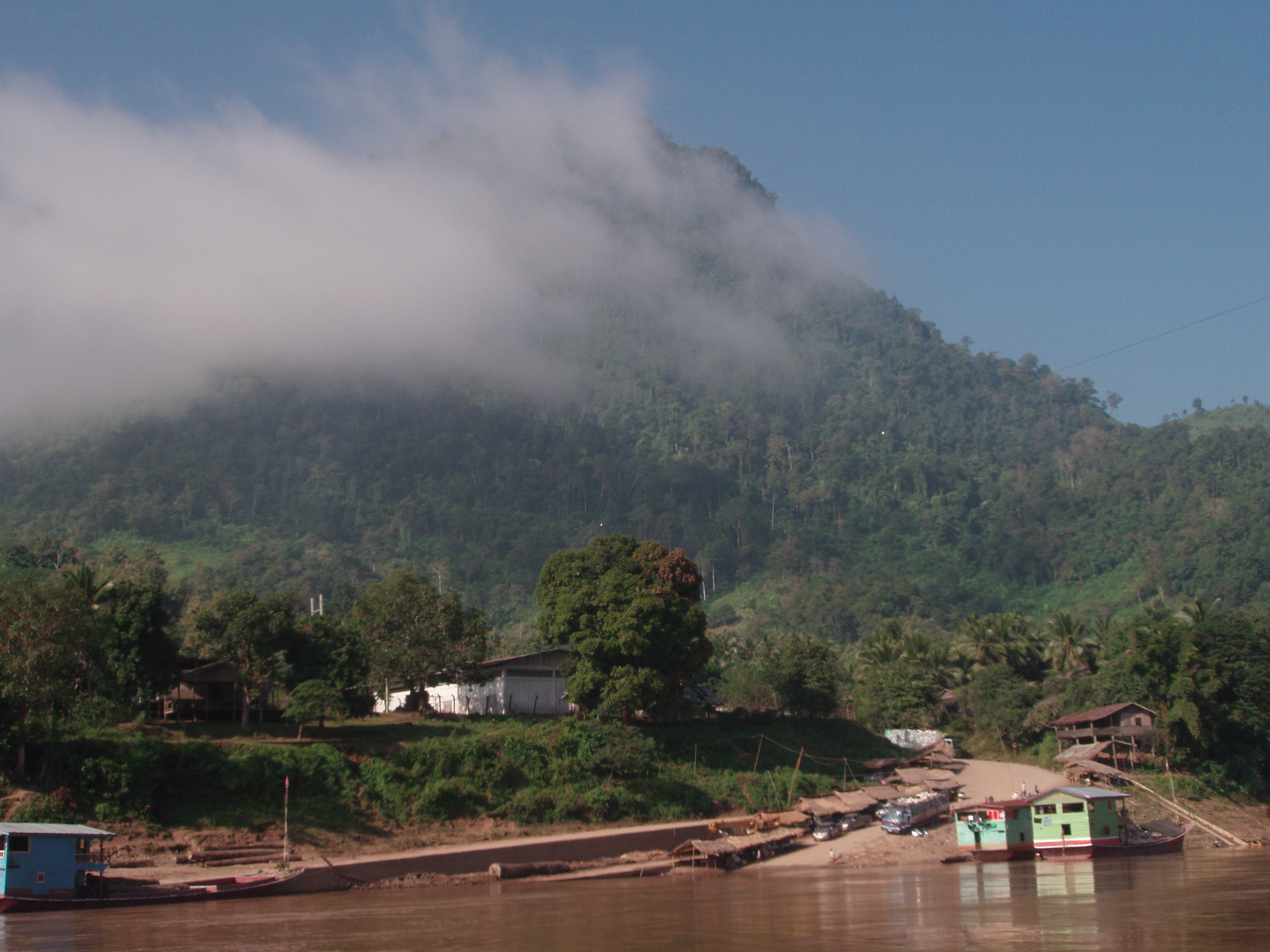
- Ferry berth, Sainyabuli

- Location in Laos
- Coordinates: 19°15′N 101°45′E
- Country: Laos
- Province: Sainyabuli

Population (2015)
  - Total: 75,700
- Time zone: UTC+7 (ICT)

Sainyabuli, (Lao: ໄຊຍະບູລີ; alternatively spelled Sayaboury, Xaignabouli, Xayaburi, or Xayaboury) is the capital of Sainyabuli Province, Laos. It lies on Route 4 which along with Route 13 connects it to Luang Prabang, roughly 80 kilometres northeast by road and to the Thai border across the Luang Prabang Range in the southwest. Sainyabuli Airport lies southwest of the town.

The capital stands on the banks of the Nam Hung, a tributary of the Mekong River towards the northern end of the province. The area is allegedly a heartland for military involvement in illegal timber trade.

== Landmarks ==
Wat Si Bun Huang, a Buddhist temple of over 500 years vintage lies in the southern part of the town. Also of note is Wat Si Phan Don, noted for its diamond-shaped stupa and Wat Sisavang Vong, erected by King Sisavang Vong himself on the site of a former temple. The town contains a museum and library and 2 bus terminals each of which are about 2 kilometres north and south of the town respectively.

== Climate ==
Climate data for Sainyabuli (1991–2020)
Month	Jan	Feb	Mar	Apr	May	Jun	Jul	Aug	Sep	Oct	Nov	Dec	Year
Record high °C (°F)	35.0 (95.0)	38.0 (100.4)	39.6 (103.3)	42.9 (109.2)	42.0 (107.6)	38.8 (101.8)	37.0 (98.6)	36.0 (96.8)	36.2 (97.2)	35.0 (95.0)	35.5 (95.9)	33.8 (92.8)	42.9 (109.2)
Mean daily maximum °C (°F)	27.9 (82.2)	30.1 (86.2)	32.6 (90.7)	33.9 (93.0)	33.1 (91.6)	32.3 (90.1)	31.3 (88.3)	30.8 (87.4)	30.8 (87.4)	30.6 (87.1)	29.4 (84.9)	28.1 (82.6)	30.9 (87.6)
Daily mean °C (°F)	20.5 (68.9)	21.9 (71.4)	24.6 (76.3)	26.9 (80.4)	27.4 (81.3)	27.7 (81.9)	27.3 (81.1)	26.9 (80.4)	26.6 (79.9)	25.9 (78.6)	23.5 (74.3)	21.4 (70.5)	25.0 (77.0)
Mean daily minimum °C (°F)	14.8 (58.6)	15.2 (59.4)	18.4 (65.1)	21.8 (71.2)	23.6 (74.5)	24.5 (76.1)	24.3 (75.7)	24.1 (75.4)	23.5 (74.3)	21.9 (71.4)	18.6 (65.5)	15.5 (59.9)	20.5 (68.9)
Record low °C (°F)	6.6 (43.9)	8.0 (46.4)	10.5 (50.9)	15.1 (59.2)	16.8 (62.2)	20.0 (68.0)	21.5 (70.7)	20.5 (68.9)	18.4 (65.1)	14.5 (58.1)	10.8 (51.4)	4.8 (40.6)	4.8 (40.6)
Average precipitation mm (inches)	13.3 (0.52)	11.9 (0.47)	45.8 (1.80)	110.5 (4.35)	172.8 (6.80)	152.4 (6.00)	222.4 (8.76)	258.5 (10.18)	249.1 (9.81)	91.0 (3.58)	30.3 (1.19)	17.7 (0.70)	1,375.7 (54.16)
Average precipitation days (≥ 1.0 mm)	2	2	5	10	15	16	19	21	18	9	4	2	121
Mean monthly sunshine hours	180.8	193.7	174.3	178.3	170.6	131.5	107.6	106.4	138.2	161.6	171.2	172.6	1,886.8
Source 1: World Meteorological Organization
Source 2: NOAA (extremes)
