= Muang Xay =

Xay ເມືອງໄຊ Udomxai, Muang Xay
- District & municipality
- Xay District
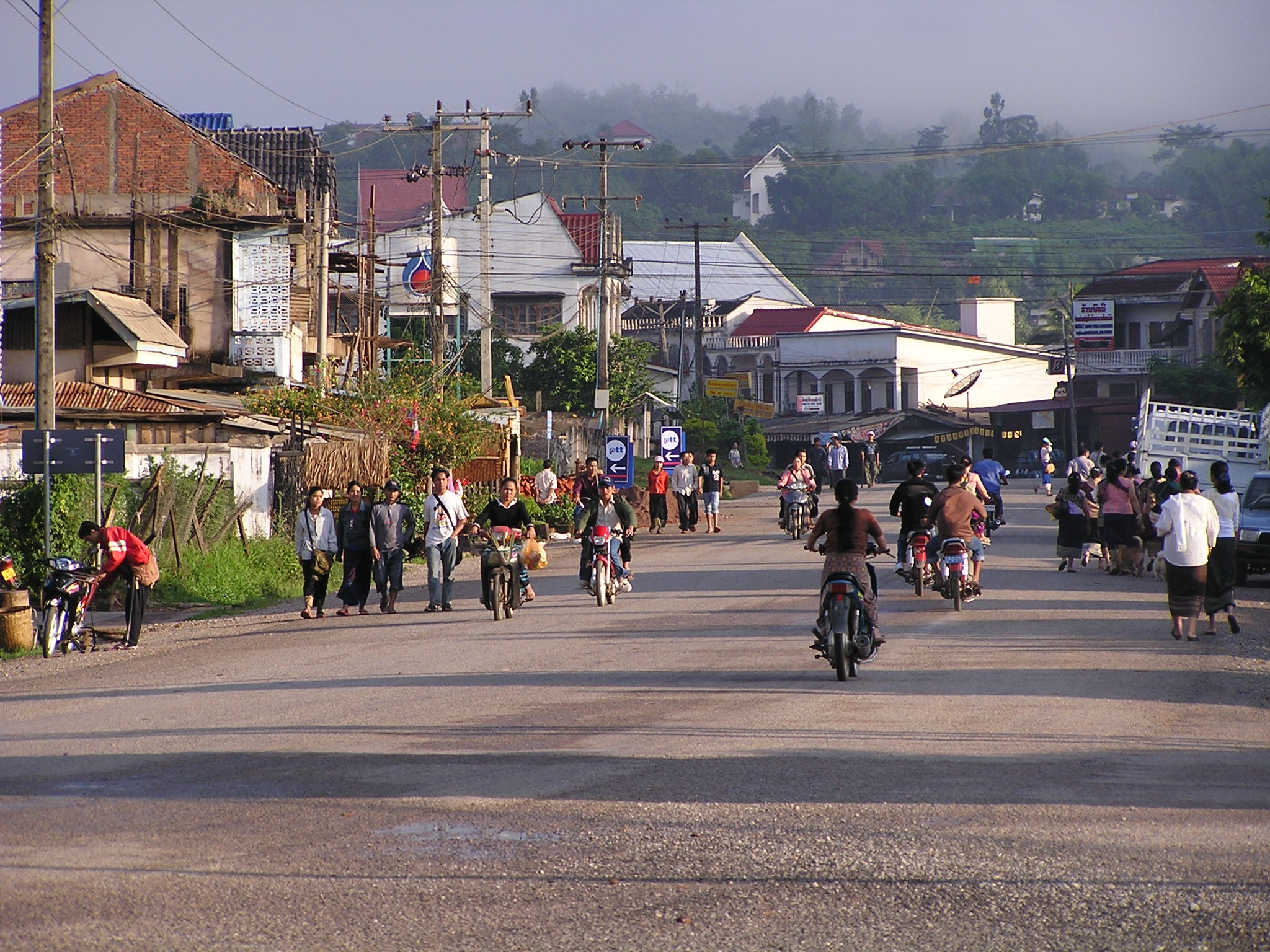

- Location in Laos
- Coordinates: 20°41′29″N 101°59′10″E
- Country: Laos
- Province: Oudomxai

Population (2015)
  - Total: 79,500
  - Religions: Buddhism
- Time zone: UTC+7 (ICT)
- Website: www.oudomxay.info

Muang Xay (Lao: ເມືອງໄຊ, pronounced [mɯ́a̯ŋ sáj]), also referred to as Oudomxai or Oudomxay, is the capital city of Oudomxai Province, Laos.

== Naming ==
Legend has it that in the year 1323, the inhabitants of the village Ban Luang Cheng in "Takka Sila" town were in the forest to cut bamboo. While they were making some bamboo fishing utensils, they saw a monk coming from the forest walking towards them. He had gone to the forest before to meditate. The monk asked the villagers what they were doing and they replied that they were making a fishing basket. They offered him food. Because of that experience, the villagers changed the town's name from "Takka Sila" to "Muang Xay", as the monk's name was "Paxay".

== Infrastructure ==
The town is served by Oudomsay Airport, about a 10 minute walk from town center.

It has a station on the Boten–Vientiane railway.

== Demography ==
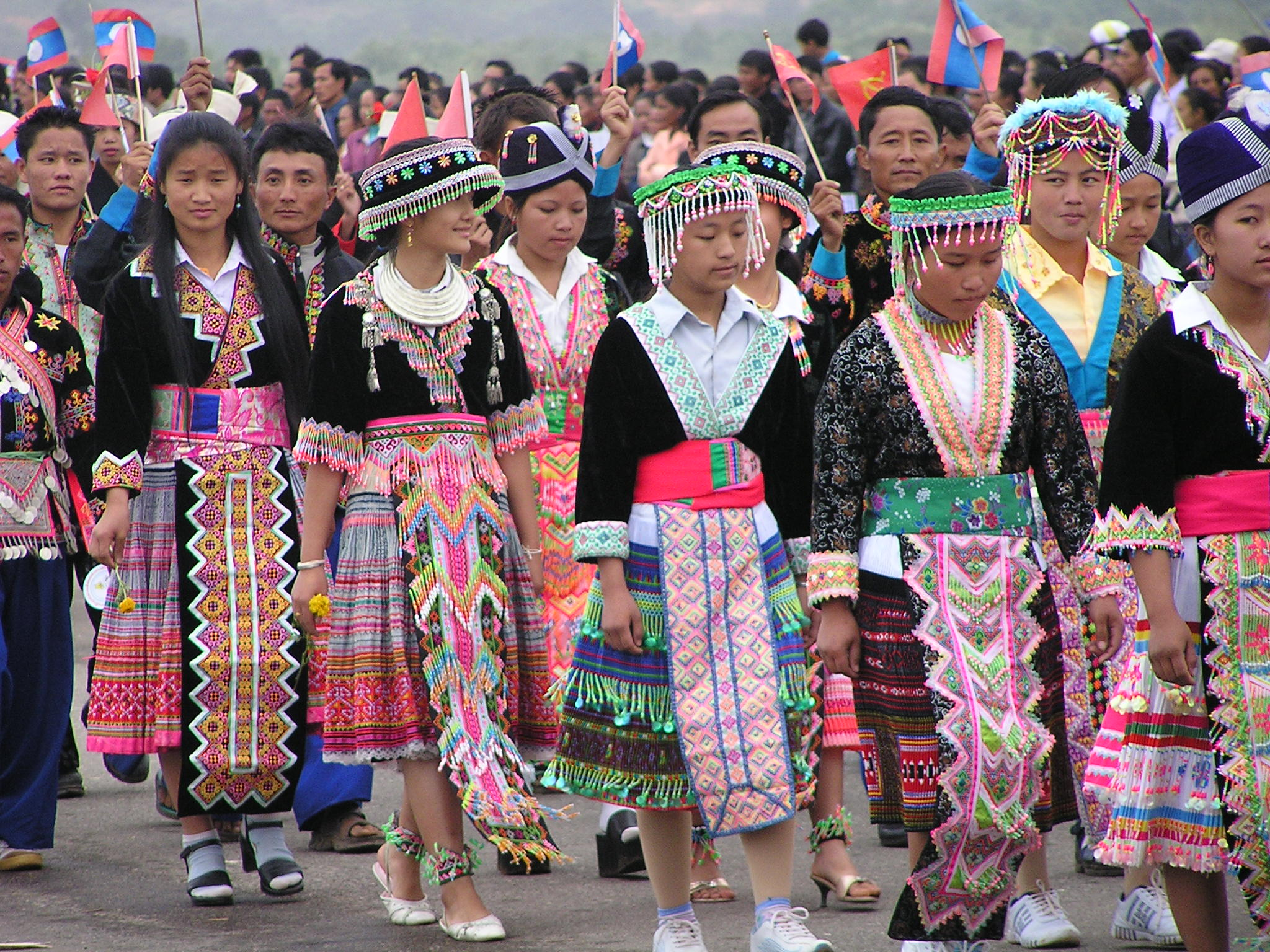
Hmong women, Muang Xay

The residents of the town are mainly Lao Loum, along with the presence of the ethnic group Khmu, 60% of the province's population.

== Geography and climate ==
Oudomxay Province has a moderate monsoon climate. Due to its higher elevation, there are more variations in temperature during the year and a colder dry season in northern Laos than in the rest of the country.

Yearly precipitation is about 1,900–2,600 mm. Temperatures in February and March average between 18 and 19 °C, from April to May temperatures climb over 31 °C.

Climate data for Muang Xay, elevation 636 m (2,087 ft), (2006–2020)
Month	Jan	Feb	Mar	Apr	May	Jun	Jul	Aug	Sep	Oct	Nov	Dec	Year
Mean daily maximum °C (°F)	24.7 (76.5)	27.8 (82.0)	30.1 (86.2)	31.7 (89.1)	31.5 (88.7)	30.4 (86.7)	29.4 (84.9)	29.7 (85.5)	29.9 (85.8)	29.2 (84.6)	27.2 (81.0)	24.9 (76.8)	28.9 (84.0)
Daily mean °C (°F)	18.1 (64.6)	19.9 (67.8)	22.4 (72.3)	25.1 (77.2)	26.1 (79.0)	26.3 (79.3)	25.8 (78.4)	25.8 (78.4)	25.6 (78.1)	24.0 (75.2)	21.4 (70.5)	18.6 (65.5)	23.3 (73.9)
Mean daily minimum °C (°F)	11.6 (52.9)	11.9 (53.4)	14.6 (58.3)	18.6 (65.5)	20.6 (69.1)	22.3 (72.1)	22.2 (72.0)	21.9 (71.4)	21.2 (70.2)	18.8 (65.8)	15.5 (59.9)	12.3 (54.1)	17.6 (63.7)
Average precipitation mm (inches)	36.2 (1.43)	12.3 (0.48)	45.9 (1.81)	130.1 (5.12)	135.6 (5.34)	152.6 (6.01)	294.7 (11.60)	303.9 (11.96)	150.5 (5.93)	56.2 (2.21)	38.5 (1.52)	28.5 (1.12)	1,385 (54.53)
Average precipitation days	2.6	1.7	3.9	8.9	11.5	12.8	20.3	19.9	11.4	5.8	3.8	1.5	104.1
Average relative humidity (%)	74.7	66.0	62.4	65.7	69.7	76.1	79.4	81.7	78.0	76.0	76.1	74.7	73.4
Mean monthly sunshine hours	182.7	200.4	199.5	174.7	202.0	130.8	126.1	121.0	157.5	181.3	179.0	189.5	2,044.5
Source 1: Meteomanz
Source 2: SeaDelt (humidity and sun 2016–2022)

== Tourism ==
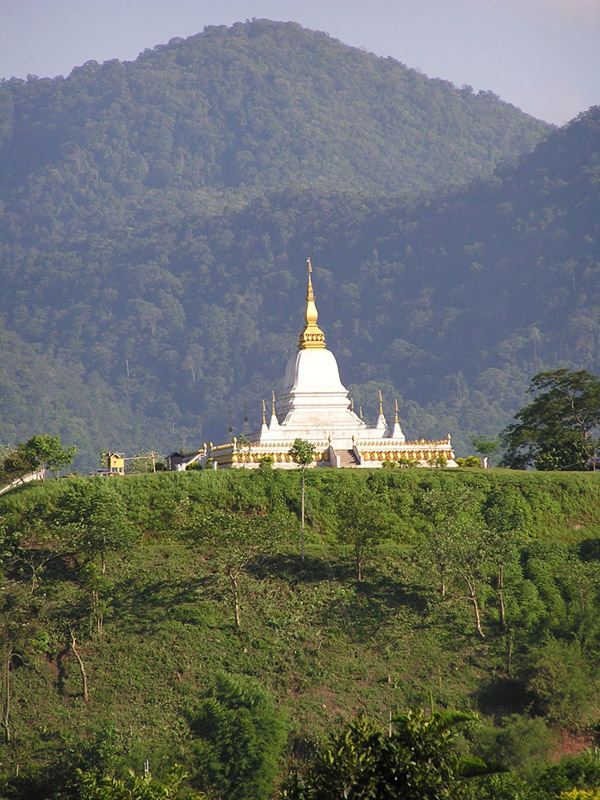
Stupa, Muang Xay, on Phou That mountain

For some years, efforts have been made to encourage tourism in Muang Xay in order to ameliorate the region's poverty. Since 1997 there has been a tourism office in Muang Xay, supported by the German Development Service (DED) since 2005. The support of DED aims to raise the incomes of the rural population and small-scale enterprises via tourism and thereby protect natural resources.

=== Development ===
Oudomxay is seen as a province in which discovering "authentic" Laos is possible, especially in terms of ecotourism. The tourism office offers guided trekking tours, a Lao cookery course, and a workshop on traditional paper making.

According to the Statistical Report on Tourism in Laos 2008 by the Lao National Tourism Administration, the number of tourists has increased from approximately 18,600 to 102,000 between 2001 and 2008. According to the statistics, approximately 17% of all 1.7 million tourists visiting Laos in 2008 came to Oudomxay. Oudomxay has eight hotels and approximately 52 guesthouses.

=== Potential ===
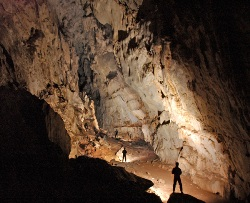
Chom Ong Cave, ceiling height 35 m

Overall, about 1,286 beds were available in Oudomxay in 2006. In 2008, their occupancy rate was approximately 60% compared to 73% in Luang Prabang.

There is a discovered Chom Ong Cave, about 45 km from Oudomxay, the largest known cave in northern Laos. It has a length of more than 16 km, ceiling heights up to 50 m, a stream course flowing in the cave and is rated "exceptional" and "the most significant find and the biggest highlight" in northern Laos by some speleological magazines.
