= Luang Prabang International Airport =

Airport in Laos

Luang Prabang International Airport ສະຫນາມບິນສາກົນຫຼວງພະບາງ
- IATA: LPQ; ICAO: VLLB

Summary
- Airport type: Public
- Operator: Government
- Location: Luang Prabang Luang Prabang Province
- Hub for: Lao Airlines
- Elevation AMSL: 955 ft (291 m)
- Coordinates: 19°53′50″N 102°09′39″E
- Website: https://www.luangprabangairport.com/

Map
- Location of airport in Laos

Runways
Direction	Length		Surface
Direction	ft	m	Surface
05/23	8,202	2,500	Asphalt

Luang Prabang International Airport (Lao: ສະຫນາມບິນສາກົນຫຼວງພະບາງ) (IATA: LPQ, ICAO: VLLB) is an international airport in Laos. The airport is located about 4 kilometres (2.5 mi) from the centre of Luang Prabang. The second busiest airport in the country, it is a regional hub for international flights to Bangkok and Chiang Mai in Thailand, and Siem Reap in Cambodia as well as domestically to Vientiane. The airport underwent significant expansion work in 2012–13, when it was upgraded and expanded, and the runway enlarged.

== Airlines and destinations ==
=== Passenger ===
Airlines	Destinations
Bangkok Airways	Bangkok–Suvarnabhumi
China Eastern Airways	Kunming
Lao Airlines	Chiang Mai, Hanoi, Vientiane
Thai AirAsia	Bangkok–Don Mueang
Vietnam Airlines	Hanoi, Siem Reap
