= Parklai district =

Parklai
- District
- Parklai district
- Country: Laos
- Province: Sainyabuli
- Time zone: UTC+7 (ICT)

Parklai is a district of Sainyabuli province, Laos.

== Towns ==
- Hatdai
- Muang Saiapoun
- Phon Ngam
