= Ban Napho =

- Village
- Location within Laos
- Coordinates: 18°28′26″N 101°32′55″E
- Country: Laos
- Province: Sainyabuli Province
- Time zone: UTC+7 (Laos Standard Time)

Ban Napho is a village in Sainyabuli Province, Laos. It is located to the northeast of Muang Saiapoun, and southwest of Muang Pa.
