= Hatdai =

- Town
- Location within Laos
- Coordinates: 18°26′2″N 101°29′37″E
- Country: Laos
- Province: Sainyabuli Province
- Time zone: UTC+7 (Laos Standard Time)

Hatdai is a small river town in Sainyabuli Province, Laos. It is located along the main road (Route 4, south of Phon Ngam and north of Muang Saiapoun. It contains a market. A road connects it to Ban Nata in the east.
