= Hongsa =

Hongsa ຫົງສາ
- Location within Laos
- Coordinates: 19°42′14″N 101°20′14″E
- Country: Laos
- Province: Sainyabuli
- District: Hongsa

Population
  - Total: 6,000
- Time zone: UTC+7 (ICT)
- Area code: 074

Hongsa (Lao: ຫົງສາ, pronounced [hǒŋ.sǎː]) is a town in northwestern Laos. It is in Hongsa District in Sainyabuli Province. The town is 81 kilometres (50 mi) northwest of the provincial capital Sainyabuli. Nearby Ban Viengkeo is a rotating host to a major elephant festival. The district is the site of the Hongsa coal-fired power plant that began operation in 2015.

== Economy ==
The economy is dominated by the 1,878 MW Hongsa lignite-fired power plant adjacent to Thailand's Nan Province. The Hongsa plant accounts for around a third of Lao energy production. Almost all of its power is exported to Thailand. The plant is 80% Thai-owned, backed by nine Thai banks. Thai residents have seen negative impacts on their farms, watershed, and environment from pollution that may originate at the Hongsa plant. The plant has been at the centre of land grab controversies, with thousands of residents reportedly losing land and receiving little compensation. The economy of Hongsa is being transformed by the Hongsa power plant. Plant construction is provided about 3,000 jobs and average local incomes have already risen sharply. Once the plant goes online, local officials anticipate further employment growth with the creation of factories to export to Thailand and other ASEAN nations.

== Environment ==
The Hongsa power plant is a coal-fired plant supplying the majority of its electricity to neighbouring Thailand. The project cost is estimated at US$3.7 billion with completion in 2015. The plant is 80% Thai-owned, with the remaining 20% held by the Lao government. Its capacity is 1,878 megawatts, of which 1,500 MW is exported to Thailand. The plant, and associated lignite mine, will be Laos's largest.

While project officials have highlighted the economic benefits of the plant, environmental groups have raised concerns about the impact of the project on the local people and environment. Concerns include:

- The air pollution arising from coal-fired power generation and potentially harmful effects on the health of local people
- Diminished clean water resources as streams are dammed for reservoirs to supply the plant
- Destruction of forested areas to clear land for open surface lignite mining

== Sights and attractions ==
The annual Elephant Festival, held in February each year, has attracted increasing numbers of visitors to the province. In 2008, the festival attracted more than 50,000 visitors. The venue of the festival rotates between nearby Ban Viengkeo, Pak Lay and Sainyabuli. The festival is one of a number of projects by organiser Elefantasia to conserve and raise awareness of Laos's elephant population.

One of the town's monasteries, Wat Simungkhun, contains a stone platform allegedly covering a hole "leading to the end of the world".
