= Ban Na Le =

- Village
- Location within Laos
- Coordinates: 18°42′41″N 101°31′20″E
- Country: Laos
- Province: Sainyabuli Province
- Time zone: UTC+7 (Laos Standard Time)

Ban Na Le is a village in Sainyabuli Province, Laos. It is located along the main road (Route 4, south of Ban Nakhem and Muang Phiang.
