= List of cities in Laos =

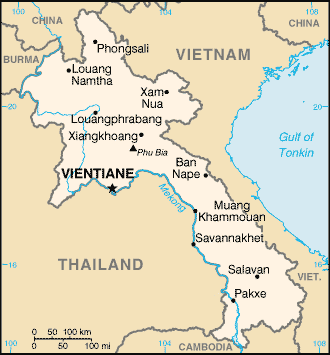
A map of Laos

This is a list of cities in Laos, a country in Asia.

== Towns and cities ==
City	Population	Coordinates	Province
Vientiane	768,743	17.97°N 102.60°E	Vientiane Prefecture
Kaysone Phomvihane City	125,760	16.57°N 104.75°E	Savannakhet province
Pakse (Pakxe)	88,332	15.12°N 105.78°E	Champasak
Luang Prabang (Louangphrabang)	47,378	19.89°N 102.14°E	Luang Prabang (Louangphrabang)
Xam Neua (Xam Nua, Sam Neua)	38,992	20.42°N 104.05°E	Houaphanh
Phonsavan (Ban Phonsavan)	37,507	19.46°N 103.18°E	Xiangkhouang
Thakhek	26,200	17.41°N 104.83°E	Khammouane (Khammouan)
Muang Xay (Oudomxai)	25,000	20.69°N 101.98°E	Oudomxay (Oudomxai)
Xaysomboun (Viengchan)	25,000	18.92°N 102.45°E	Vientiane
Vang Vieng	25,000	18°55′36″N 102°26′58″E	Vientiane
Pakxan (Muang Pakxan)	21,967	18.38°N 103.66°E	Bolikhamsai (Bolikhamxai)
Attapeu (Attopu)	19,200	14.80°N 106.83°E	Attapeu (Attopu)
Houayxay	17,687	20.26°N 100.43°E	Bokeo
Luang Namtha		20.95°N 101.40°E	Luang Namtha
Phongsali (Phongsaly)		21.68°N 102.10°E	Phongsali (Phongsaly)
Sainyabuli (Xaignabouli)	16,200	19.25°N 101.75°E	Sainyabuli (Xaignabouli)
Salavan (Saravane)		15.72°N 106.42°E	Salavan (Saravane)
Sekong (Xekong)		15.34°N 106.72°E	Sekong (Xekong)

== Gallery ==
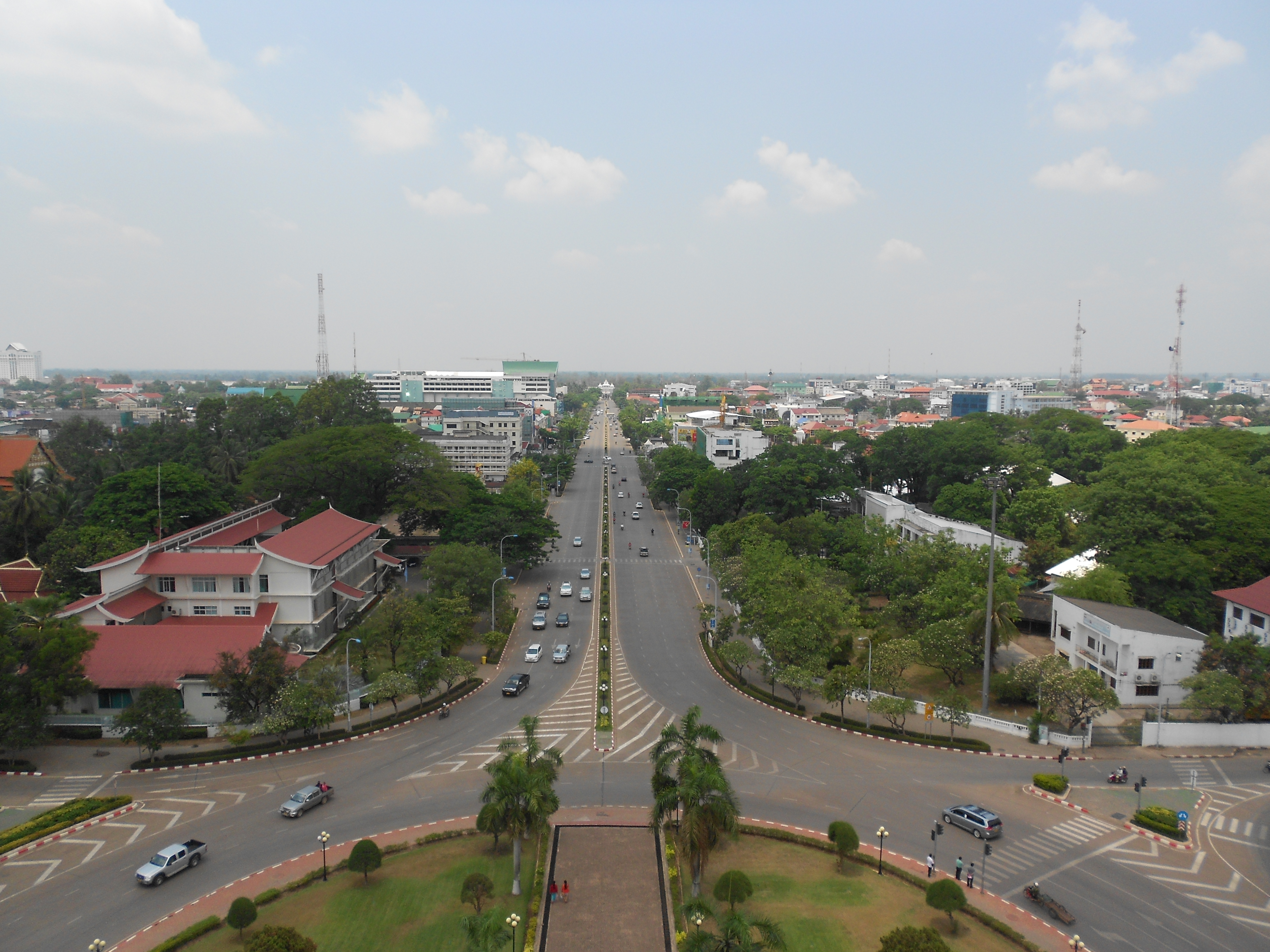
Vientiane

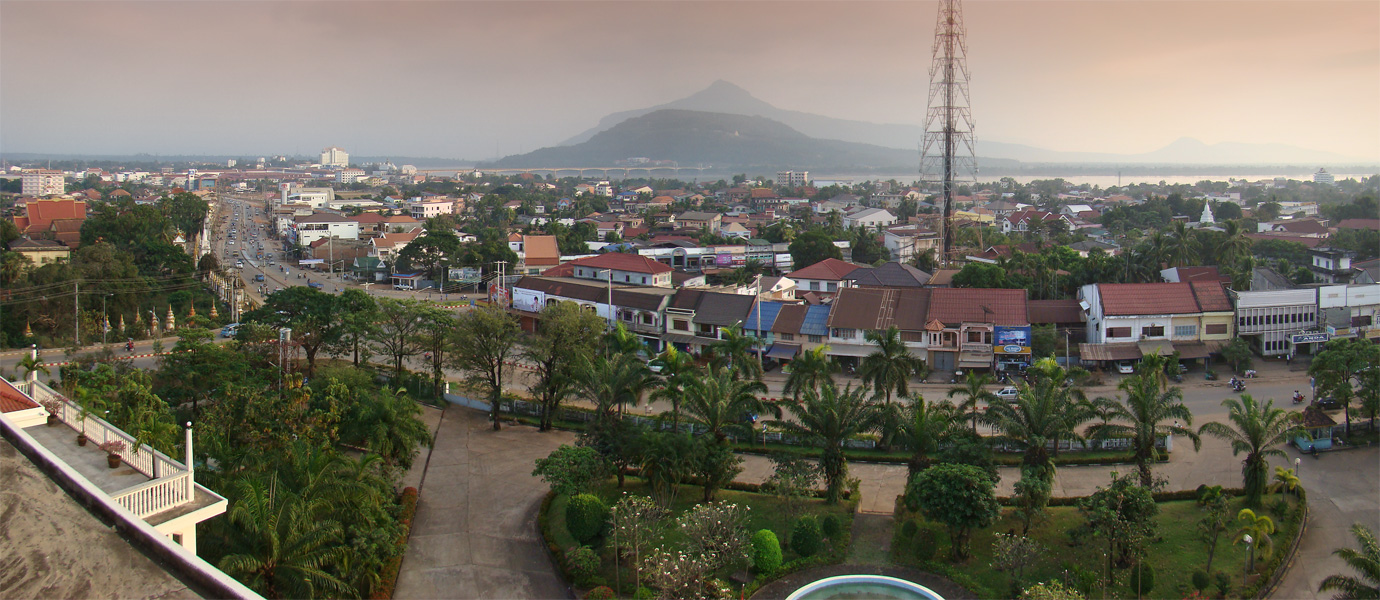
Pakse

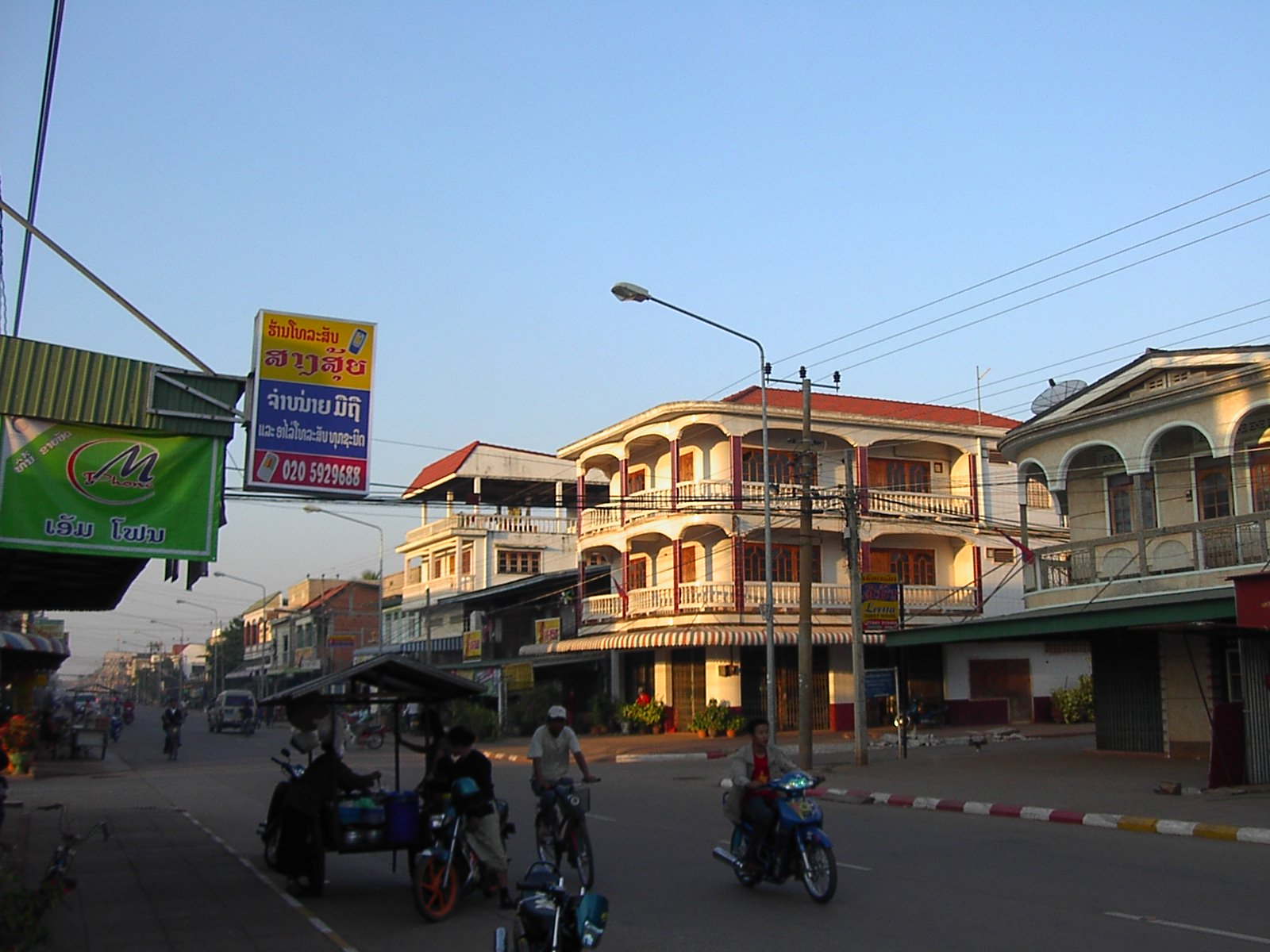
Savannakhet

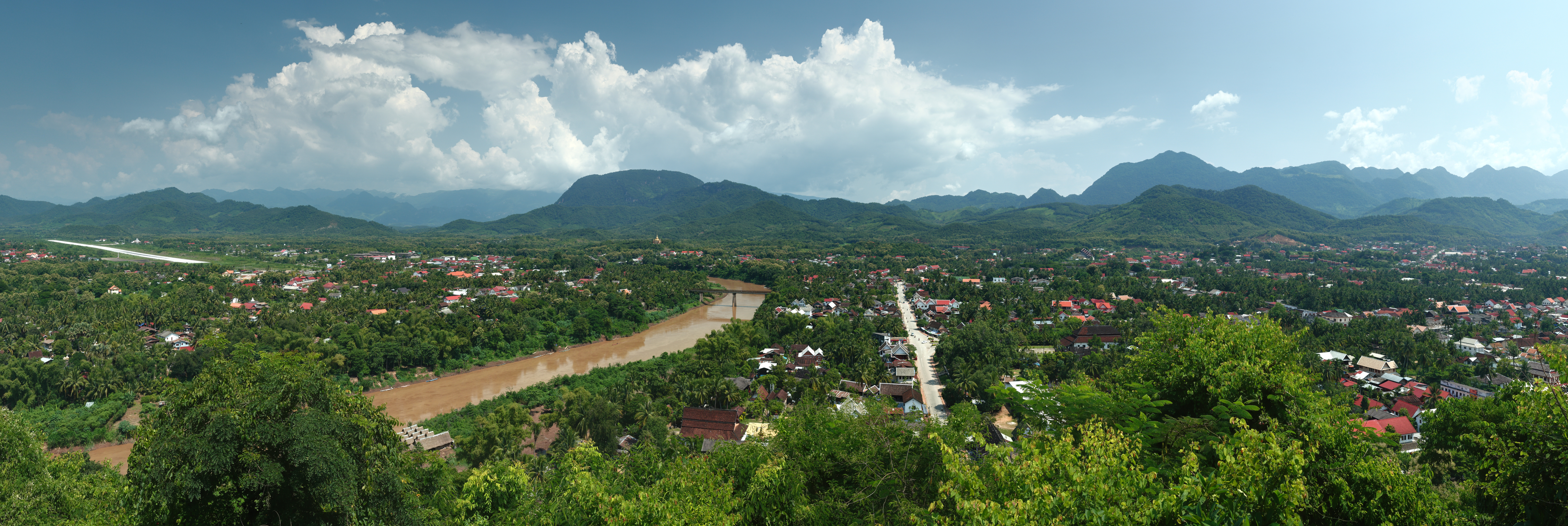
Luang Prabang

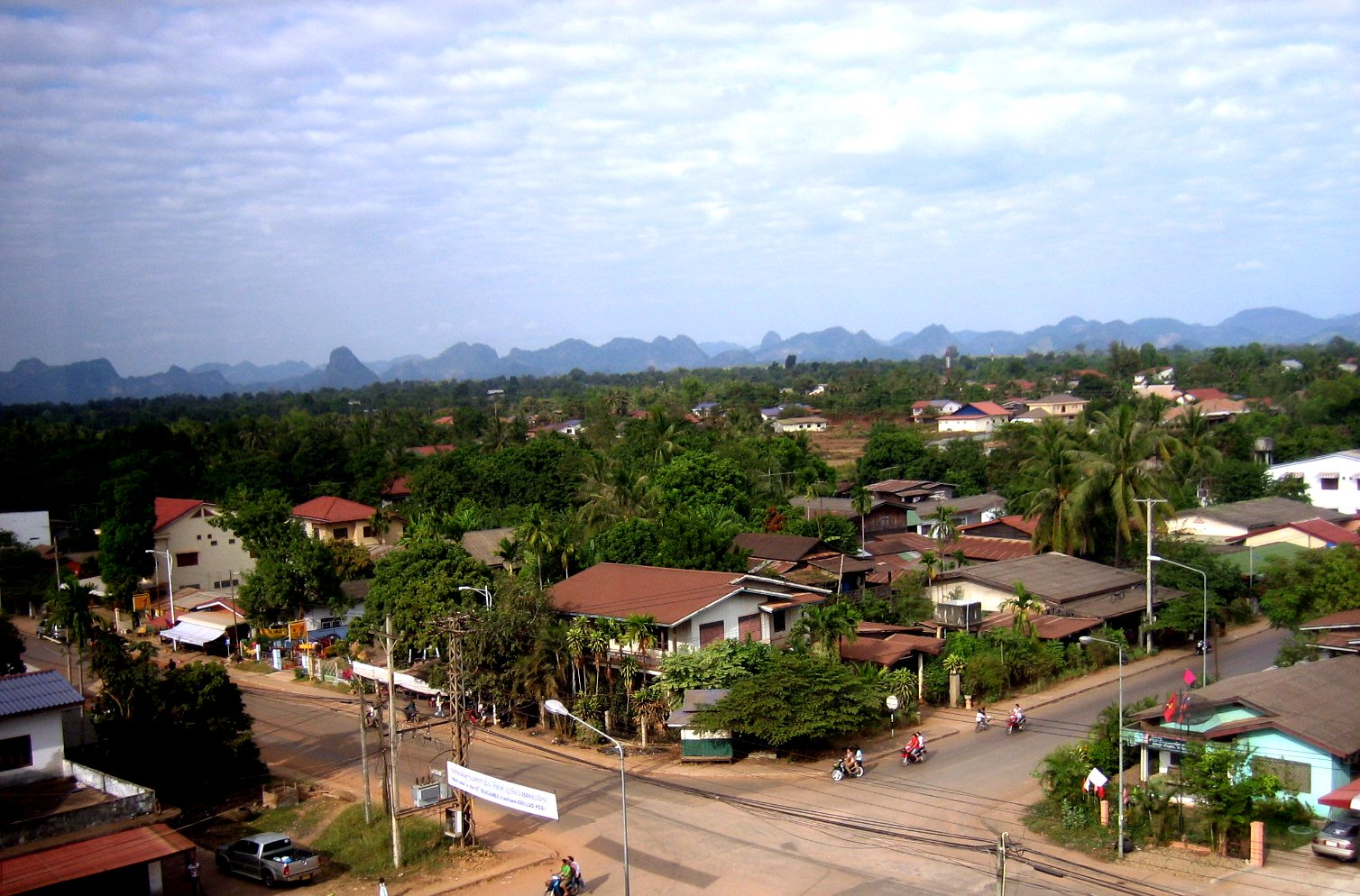
Thakhek

== See also ==
- Provinces of Laos
- Districts of Laos
