= Ban Nakhem =

- Village
- Location within Laos
- Coordinates: 18°58′N 101°31′E
- Country: Laos
- Province: Sainyabuli Province
- Time zone: UTC+7 (Laos Standard Time)

Ban Nakhem is a village in Sainyabuli Province, Laos. It is located along the main road (Route 4, south of Muang Phiang and southwest of Sainyabuli. The area and surrounding villages of Ban Fainamtan and Ban Nampoui are mainly engaged in agriculture, mainly rice farming.
