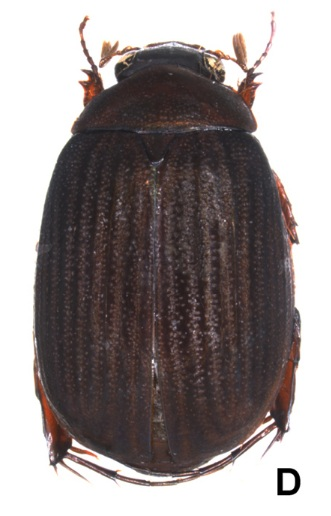

Scientific classification
- Kingdom: Animalia
- Phylum: Arthropoda
- Clade: Pancrustacea
- Class: Insecta
- Order: Coleoptera
- Suborder: Polyphaga
- Infraorder: Scarabaeiformia
- Family: Scarabaeidae
- Genus: Tetraserica
- Species: T. xiengkhouangensis

Binomial name
- Tetraserica xiengkhouangensis Fabrizi, Dalstein & Ahrens, 2019

= Tetraserica xiengkhouangensis =

Species of beetle

Tetraserica xiengkhouangensis is a species of beetle of the family Scarabaeidae. It is found in Laos.

== Description ==
Adults reach a length of about 8.6–8.7 mm. The surface of the labroclypeus and the disc of the frons are glabrous. The smooth area anterior to the eye is twice as wide as long.

== Etymology ==
The species name to refers to its occurrence in the Xiangkhouang Province.
