= Muang Pa =

- Town
- Location within Laos
- Coordinates: 18°32′48″N 101°36′11″E
- Country: Laos
- Province: Sainyabuli Province
- Time zone: UTC+7 (Laos Standard Time)

Muang Pa is a town in Sainyabuli Province, Laos. It is located to the northeast of Muang Saiapoun and northwest of Muong Liep. There is a high school to the southwest of the town.
