= Phonsavan =

Phonsavan ໂພນສະຫວັນ ເມືອງແປກ
- District & municipality
- Pek District
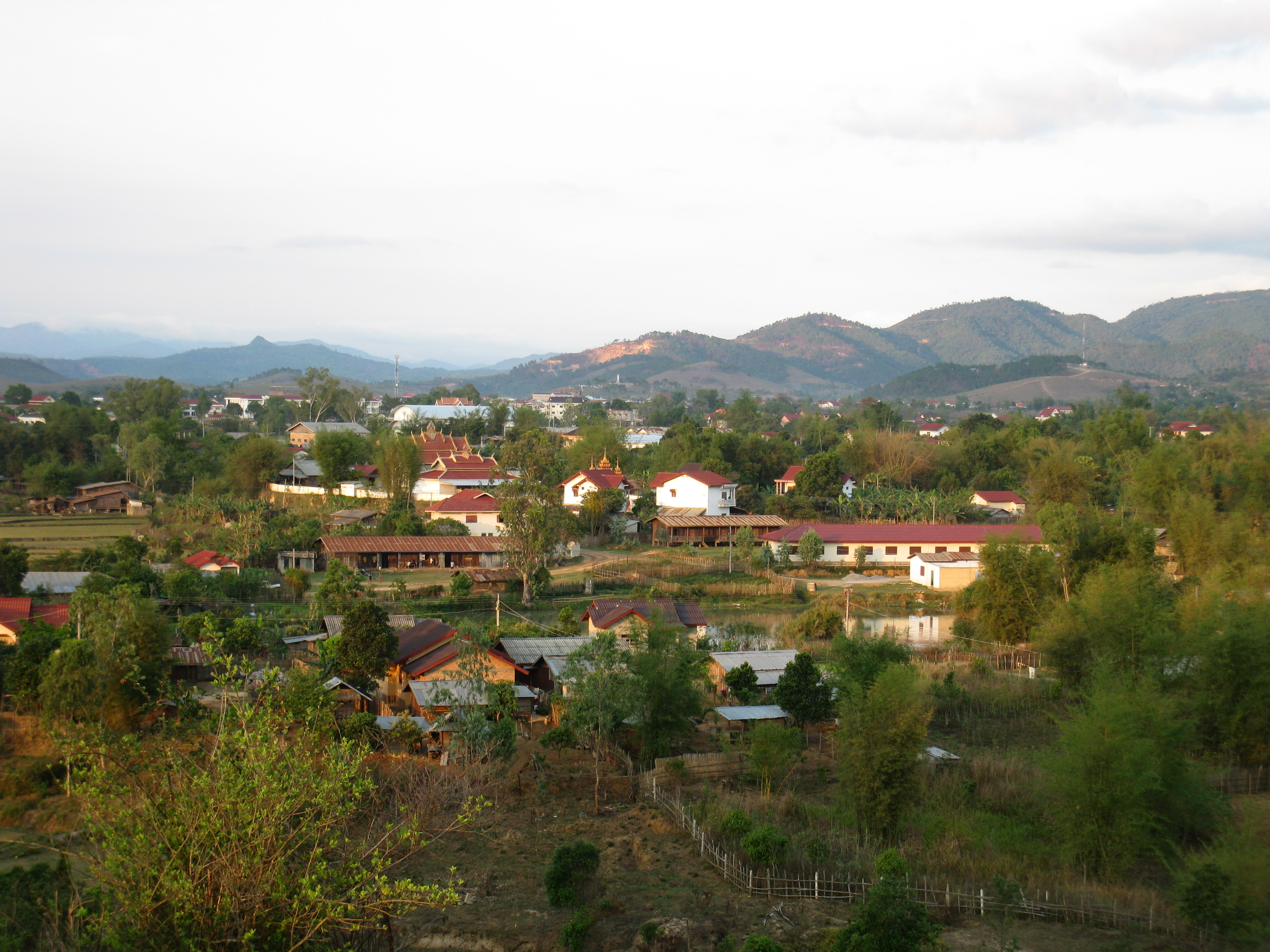
- Phonsavan

- Location in Laos
- Coordinates: 19°25′N 103°10′E
- Country: Laos
- Admin. division: Xiangkhouang Province
- Elevation: 3,600 ft (1,100 m)

Population (2015)
  - Total: 75,600
  - Religions: Buddhism
- Time zone: UTC+7 (ICT)
- Area code: 061
- Climate: Cwa

Phonsavan (also spelled Phonesavanh, Lao: ໂພນສະຫວັນ, lit. 'heaven's mound', pronounced [pʰóːn sā.wǎn]), population 37,507, is the capital of Xiangkhouang Province. Phonsavan is known for the nearby Plain of Jars, a UNESCO World Heritage Site.

== History ==
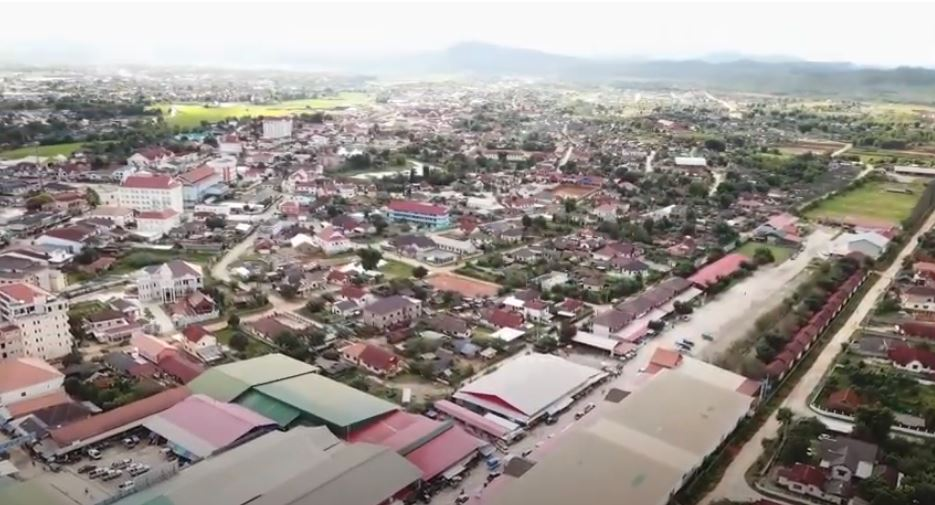
Panoramic view, c. 2020

The recorded history of Xiangkhouang is interlinked with the Tai Phuan. The Tai Phuan or Phuan people are a Buddhist Tai-Lao ethnic group that migrated to Laos from southern China and by the 13th century had formed the independent principality of Muang Phuan at the Plain of Jars, with Xiangkhouang (contemporary Muang Khoun) as the capital. In the 14th century, Muang Phuan was incorporated into the Lan Xang kingdom under King Fa Ngum.

The Phuan population were able to retain a degree of autonomy, while they had to pay tax and tribute to Lan Xang. The capital was dotted with temples in a Xiangkhouang style, with lower roofs and a characteristic "waist" at the foundation. In 1930, Le Boulanger described it as "a large and beautiful city, protected by wide moats and forts occupying the surrounding hills; and the opulence of the sixty-two pagodas and their stupas, of which the flanks concealed treasures, obtained the capital a fame that spread fear wide and far."

After the Kingdom of Siam extended control to territories east of the Mekong in the 1770s, Muang Phuan became a Siamese vassal state and maintained tributary relations with Đại Việt. To exert greater control of the lands and people of Muang Phuan, the Siamese launched three separate campaigns (1777–1779, 1834–1836, and 1875–1876) to resettle parts of the Phuan population to the south into regions under Siamese control. Subsequent invasions by Haw marauders and splinter groups of ex-Taiping Rebellion revolutionaries from southern China plundered Luang Prabang and Xiangkhouang in the 1870s, and desecrated and destroyed the temples of the Phuan region.

The Franco-Siamese treaties of the 1890s placed Xiangkhouang under colonial rule as part of French Indochina until after World War II. The French used Xiangkhouang as their provincial capital. Some ruined colonial public buildings remain, such as the governor's residence, church, and the French school.

During the Laotian Civil War, Xiangkhouang was the scene of ground battles and aerial bombardment due to its strategic importance. Houaphanh and Xiangkhouang provinces were strongholds of Pathet Lao forces and their North Vietnamese allies. There is the covert air campaign conducted by the United States Air Force to neutralize communist forces or to drop unused ordnance after returning from missions in Vietnam.

Phonsavan was built after the fighting ended in 1975 to replace the former provincial capital, Muang Khoun (old Xiang Khouang), which was destroyed by wartime bombing and partially rebuilt since.

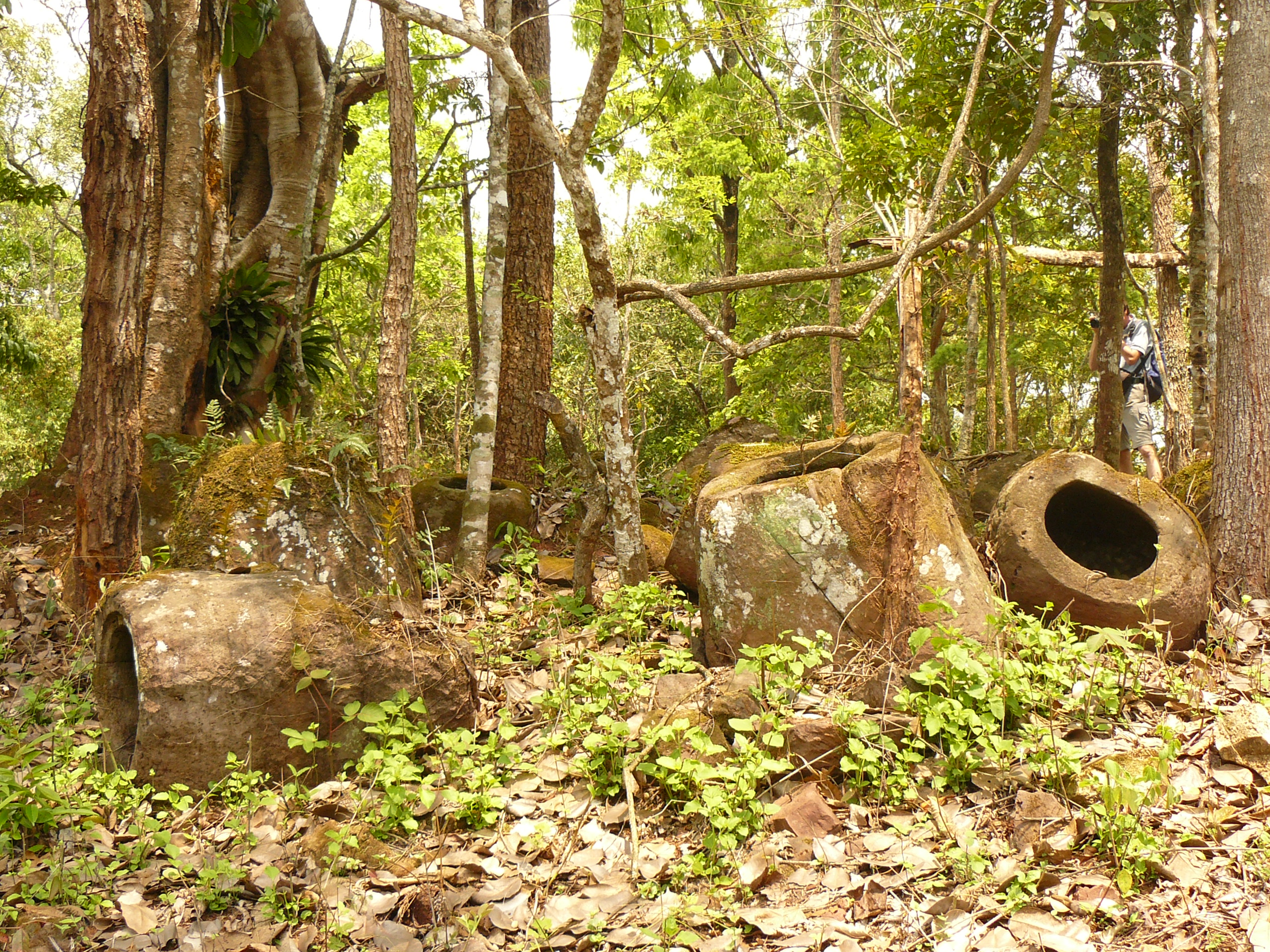
Jars, Ban Phakeo

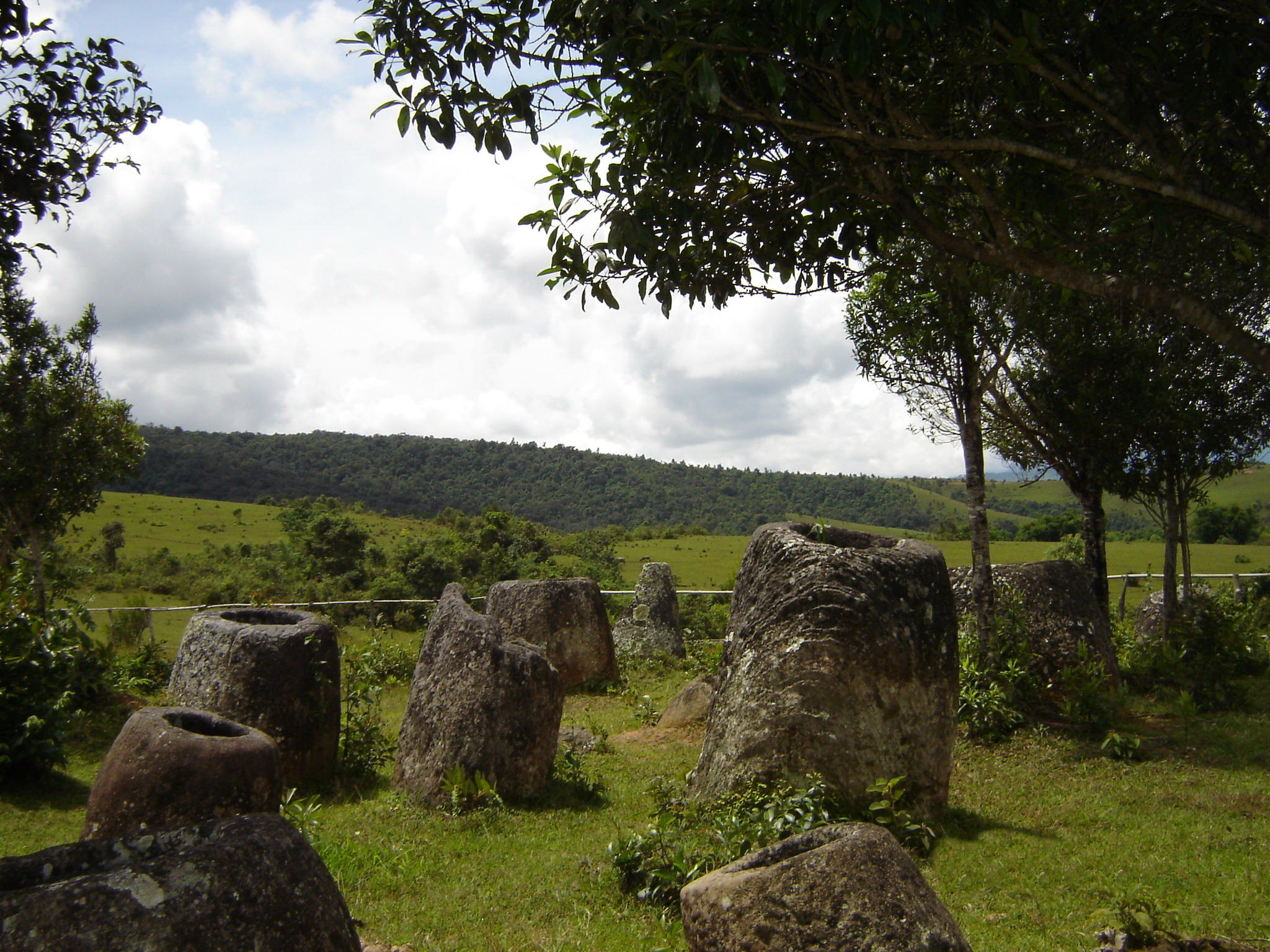
Jar Site 3

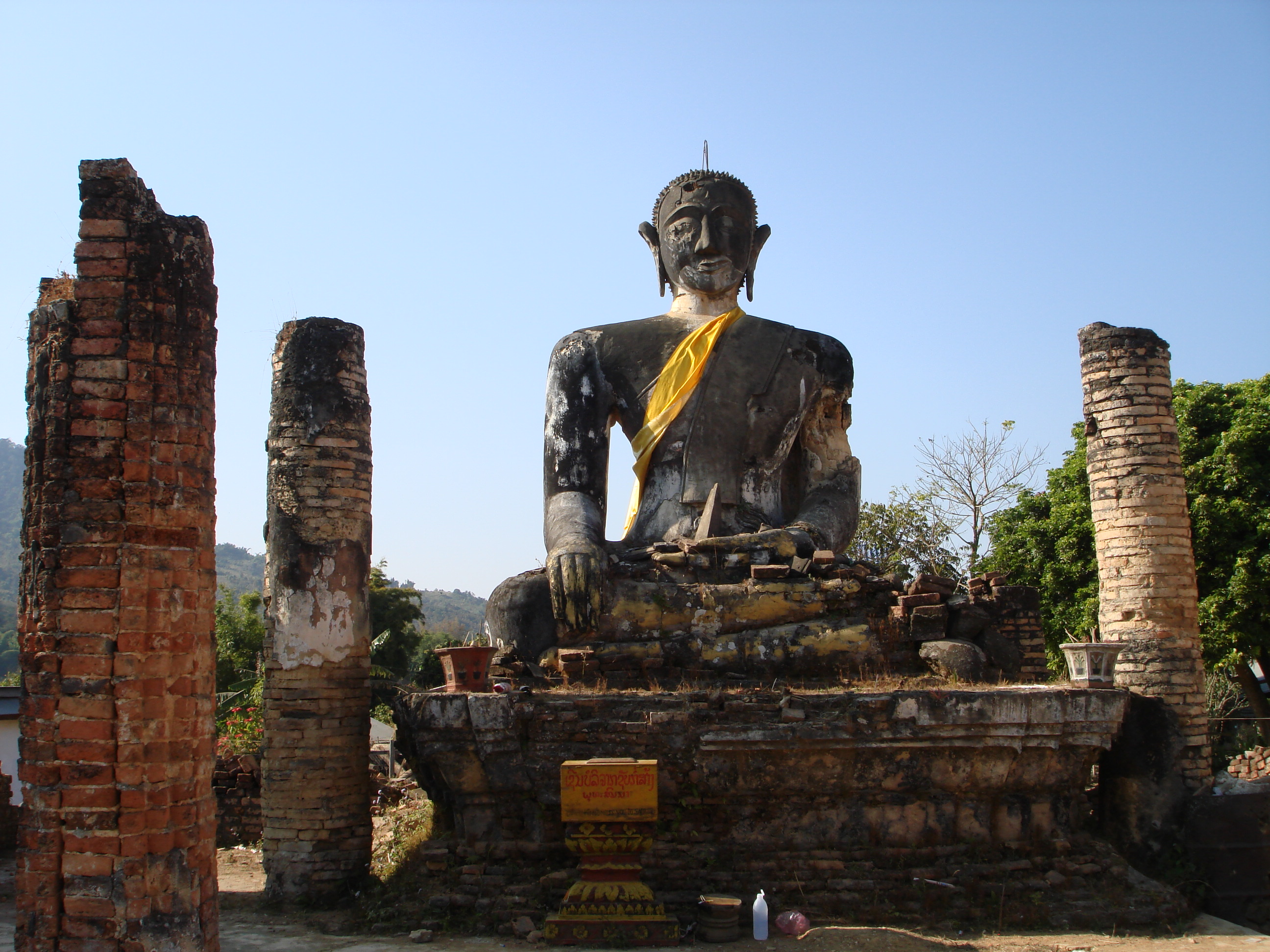
Ruins, Wat Phia Wat (16th century)

== Climate ==
Phonsavan has humid subtropical climate (Köppen Cwa) tempered by its elevation (1,100 m). Average June temperature is 23.6 °C, average December (the coldest month) temperature is 14.8 °C.

Climate data for Phonsavan, elevation 1,094 m (3,589 ft), (1996–2005)
Month	Jan	Feb	Mar	Apr	May	Jun	Jul	Aug	Sep	Oct	Nov	Dec	Year
Record high °C (°F)	30.3 (86.5)	32.2 (90.0)	33.2 (91.8)	35.0 (95.0)	34.4 (93.9)	34.3 (93.7)	32.4 (90.3)	32.1 (89.8)	32.4 (90.3)	32.0 (89.6)	32.8 (91.0)	30.0 (86.0)	35.0 (95.0)
Mean daily maximum °C (°F)	23.3 (73.9)	25.7 (78.3)	28.1 (82.6)	28.7 (83.7)	27.1 (80.8)	27.2 (81.0)	26.7 (80.1)	26.5 (79.7)	26.6 (79.9)	25.4 (77.7)	23.8 (74.8)	21.7 (71.1)	25.9 (78.6)
Daily mean °C (°F)	16.1 (61.0)	18.2 (64.8)	21.1 (70.0)	22.7 (72.9)	23.1 (73.6)	23.6 (74.5)	23.2 (73.8)	23.0 (73.4)	22.2 (72.0)	20.4 (68.7)	17.7 (63.9)	14.8 (58.6)	20.5 (68.9)
Mean daily minimum °C (°F)	8.8 (47.8)	10.7 (51.3)	14.0 (57.2)	16.6 (61.9)	19.0 (66.2)	20.0 (68.0)	19.7 (67.5)	19.4 (66.9)	17.8 (64.0)	15.4 (59.7)	11.6 (52.9)	7.8 (46.0)	15.1 (59.1)
Record low °C (°F)	−2.2 (28.0)	1.7 (35.1)	3.1 (37.6)	7.3 (45.1)	11.1 (52.0)	13.7 (56.7)	16.1 (61.0)	15.1 (59.2)	9.8 (49.6)	2.6 (36.7)	0.6 (33.1)	−1.0 (30.2)	−2.2 (28.0)
Average precipitation mm (inches)	8.7 (0.34)	15.8 (0.62)	56.9 (2.24)	145.2 (5.72)	193.6 (7.62)	193.0 (7.60)	276.8 (10.90)	300.9 (11.85)	158.2 (6.23)	63.6 (2.50)	23.1 (0.91)	8.4 (0.33)	1,444.2 (56.86)
Average rainy days	2	3	5	13	18	20	22	22	16	9	4	2	136
Average relative humidity (%)	71.0	66.7	66.0	67.9	74.3	77.3	80.1	81.9	79.0	75.3	71.9	71.4	73.6
Mean monthly sunshine hours	229.9	213.5	198.8	177.4	191.8	152.2	142.3	127.6	152.6	192.4	218.2	217.0	2,213.7
Source 1: World Meteorological OrganizationSeaDelt (humidity and sun 2016–2022)
Source 2: NOAA (extremes), The Yearbook of Indochina (1932-1940)
