= Muong Liep =

- Town
- Location within Laos
- Coordinates: 18°28′51″N 101°39′41″E
- Country: Laos
- Province: Sainyabuli Province
- Time zone: UTC+7 (Laos Standard Time)

Muong Liep is a small river town in Sainyabuli Province, Laos. It is located to the southeast of Muang Pa. There is a local legend here that Pa Kao, a limestone rock, rises straight upwards on the left bank of the river.
