= Hongsa district =

- District
- Hongsa district
- Country: Laos
- Province: Sainyabuli
- Time zone: UTC+7 (ICT)

Hongsa is a district of Sainyabuli province, Laos. The main town in the district is Hongsa town, where a coal-fired power plant is located.
