= Phon Ngam =

- Town
- Location within Laos
- Coordinates: 18°27′51″N 101°30′26″E
- Country: Laos
- Province: Sainyabuli Province
- Time zone: UTC+7 (Laos Standard Time)

Phon Ngam is a small river town in Sainyabuli Province, Laos. It is located along the main road (Route 4, south of Ban Na Le and north of Muang Saiapoun.
