= Khoune district =

Coordinates: 19°19′29″N 103°21′33″E

Khoune district ເມືອງຄູນ
- District
- Interactive map of Khoune district
- Country: Laos
- Province: Xiangkhouang

Population (2005 census)
  - Total: 31,425
- Time zone: UTC+7 (ICT)

Khoune, also known as Muang Khoun and formerly as Xiang Khouang, is a district (muang) of Xiangkhouang province in north-central Laos. The district has four main ethnic groups: Lao, Hmong, Khmu, and O Du.

Located 35 km southeast of Phonsavan, Khoune is a ghost of its former self. It was once the royal seat of the minor principality of Muang Phuan, renowned in the 16th century for its 62 opulent stupas, whose sides were said to be covered in treasure. In 1707, when the Kingdom of Lan Xang split into three separate kingdoms, Muang Phuan became a tributary state of the Kingdom of Luang Prabang.

Years of bloody invasions by Thai and Vietnamese soldiers, pillaging by Chinese bandits in the 19th century, and a monsoon of American bombs that lasted nearly a decade during the Laotian Civil War taxed this region so heavily that, by the time the air raids stopped, next to nothing was left of the kingdom's exquisite temples. Xiang Khouang itself was partially abandoned, and centuries of history were drawn to a close.

All that remains of the kingdom's former glory is an elegant Buddha image towering over ruined columns of brick at Wat Phia Wat and That Dam, both of which bear the scars of the brutal wars that ended Xieng Khuang's centuries of rich history. Although the town has since been rebuilt and renamed to Muang Khoun, its role as provincial capital has been permanently supplanted by Phonsavan.
