= Elefantasia =

ElefantAsia
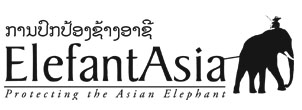
- Founded: September 2001; Paris, France
- Founder: Sebastien Duffillot; Gilles Maurer
- Type: Non-profit Organisation
- Purpose: Asian elephant conservation
- Location(s): Paris, France and Vientiane, Laos
- Region served: Xaignabouli Province; Laos
- Method: Veterinary Care, Breeding Programs, Environmental Education, Ecotourism
- Key people: Sebastien Duffillot; Gilles Maurer
- Revenue: $150,000USD/year
- Volunteers: Approx. 10
- Website: www.elefantasia.org

ElefantAsia is a nonprofit organisation protecting the Asian elephant, Elephas maximus. It operates in Laos, which it estimates to have only 1500 Asian elephants remaining, 560 of these domesticated and working with their mahouts.

== Activities ==
The group suggests that information collation, surveying and national census have proved ineffective at providing accurate data on wild and domestic elephant populations, and focusses its efforts in the areas of veterinary, educational and economical support. ElefantAsia has possessed a veterinary care unit and carries out public awareness campaigns and environmental education within Laos.

== Projects in Laos ==
=== The Elephant Festival ===
In cooperation with the National Tourism Authority, ElefantAsia organised the Elephant Festival each year since 2007. The first Elephant Festival was held in the Xaignabouli Province and attracted more than 10,000 people. In 2008 over 50,000 people attended.

=== Mobile Veterinary Unit ===
ElefantAsia created the Mobile Veterinary Unit to provide 'house calls' to domesticated elephants working in remote areas. Operating in the Xaignabouli province of Laos, the Mobile Veterinary Unit is especially designed to dispense medical care to domesticated elephants. ElefantAsia's veterinary team visits logging sites, tourist camps and villages where elephants are employed to ensure they are receiving adequate healthcare. This is necessary as vaccinations are not available, medical treatment is rare and medication dosages are hardly ever adhered to.

=== Breeding program ===
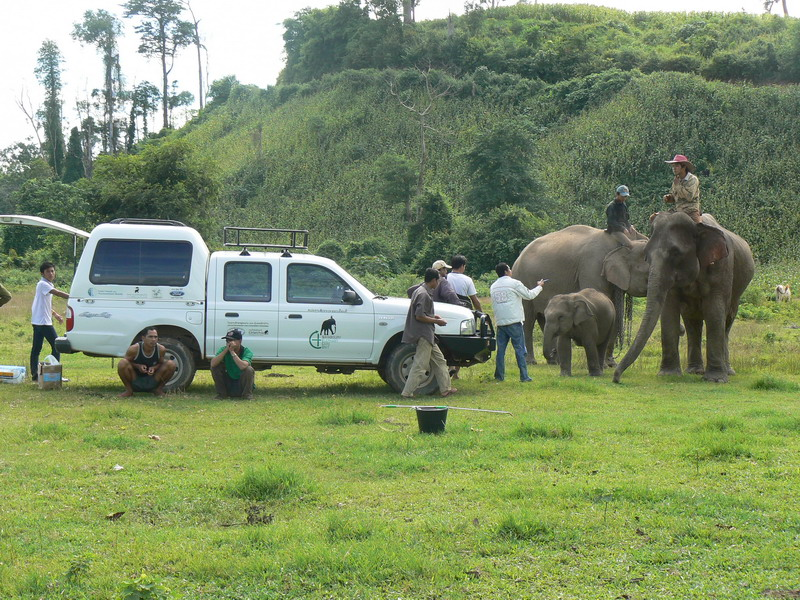
The Mobile Vet Unit working in Laos

Today in Laos the domesticated elephant population only has 2 births for every 10 deaths.

== Domesticated elephants ==
Laos is home to an approximate 560 domesticated Asian elephants. Most are engaged in timber harvesting operations and contribute to the destruction of wild elephant habitat.
