= Muang Phiang =

- Town
- Location within Laos
- Coordinates: 19°06′15″N 101°31′48″E
- Country: Laos
- Province: Sainyabuli Province
- Time zone: UTC+7 (Laos Standard Time)

Muang Phiang is a town in Sainyabuli Province, Laos. It is located along the main road (Route 4, southwest of Sainyabuli. The area surrounding it is mainly paddy fields.
