= Wat Phia Wat =

Buddhist wat in Khoune district, Laos

Coordinates: 19°19′41″N 103°22′12″E

Wat Phia Wat (Lao: ວັດເພຍວັດ, pronounced [wāt pʰía.wāt]) is a Buddhist wat in Khoune district, Laos.

== Overview ==
Wat Phiat Wat is located in Muang Khoun, the former capital of Muang Phuan in the 14th century. What Phia Wat is said to be constructed in 1322 by Chao Lan Kham Khong, in order to house the first Buddhist statue in Xiangkhouang, which was brought over from Burma. In 1375, invading Chinese forces destroyed the complex and cut off the arm of the Buddha statue, but the Wat was later rebuilt. In 1953, Wat Phia Wat was again destroyed during the First Indochina War, but it was rebuilt in 1954. Finally, the Wat was bombed by the US airforce during the Second Indochina War. Wat Phia Wat collapsed, but the Buddha statue survived, although it suffered significant damage. A new temple was created after the war.

== Gallery ==
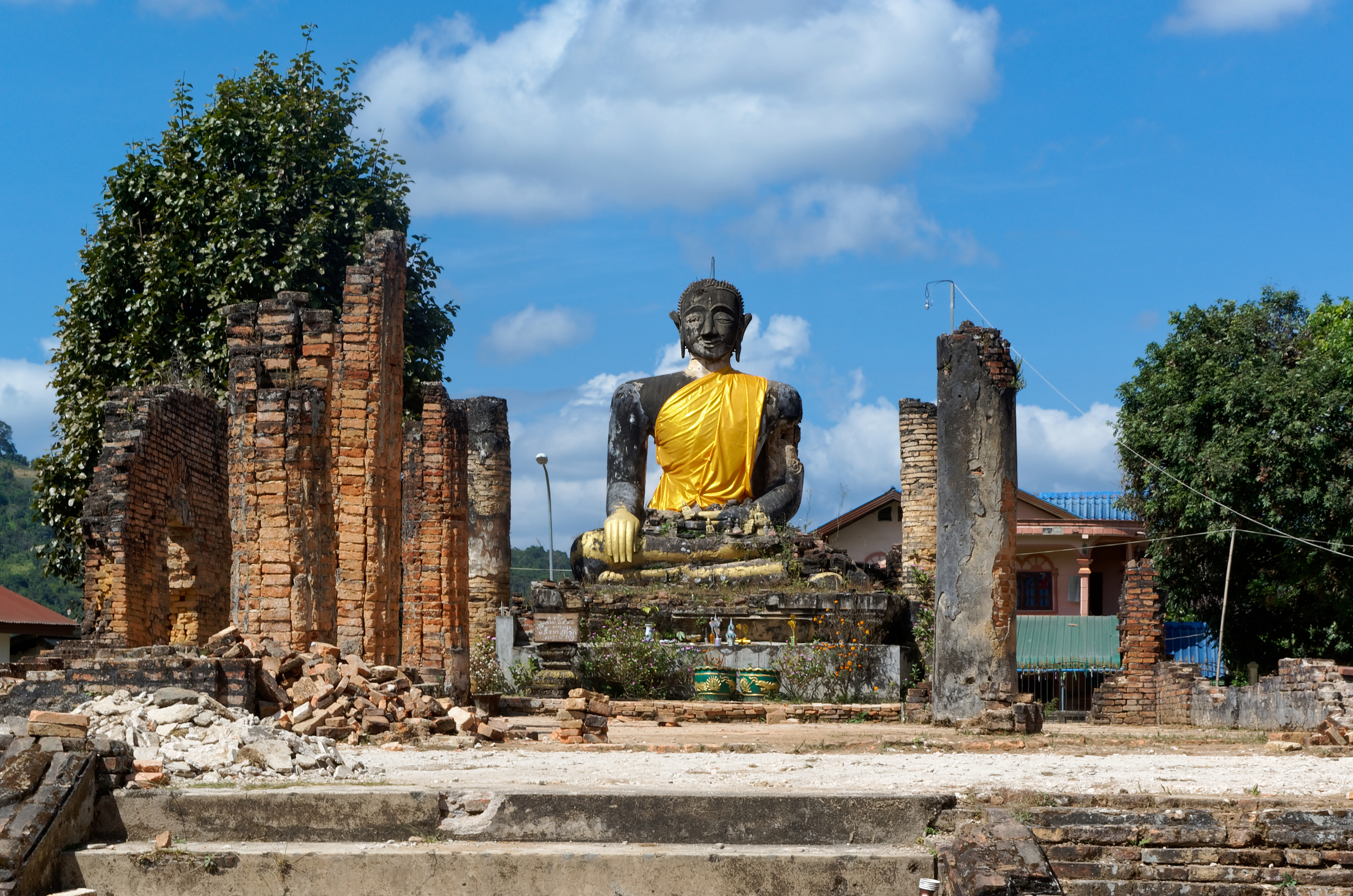

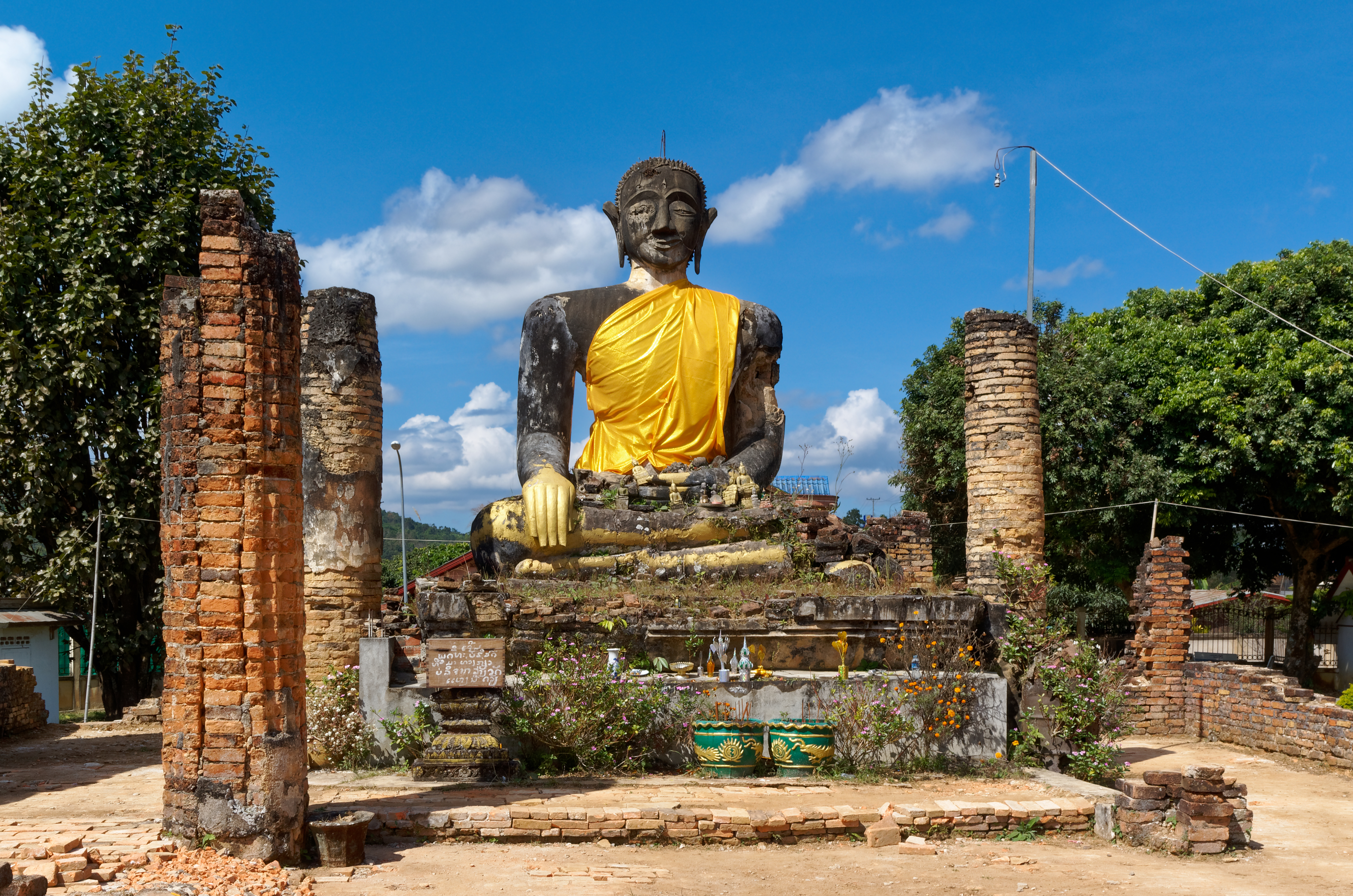

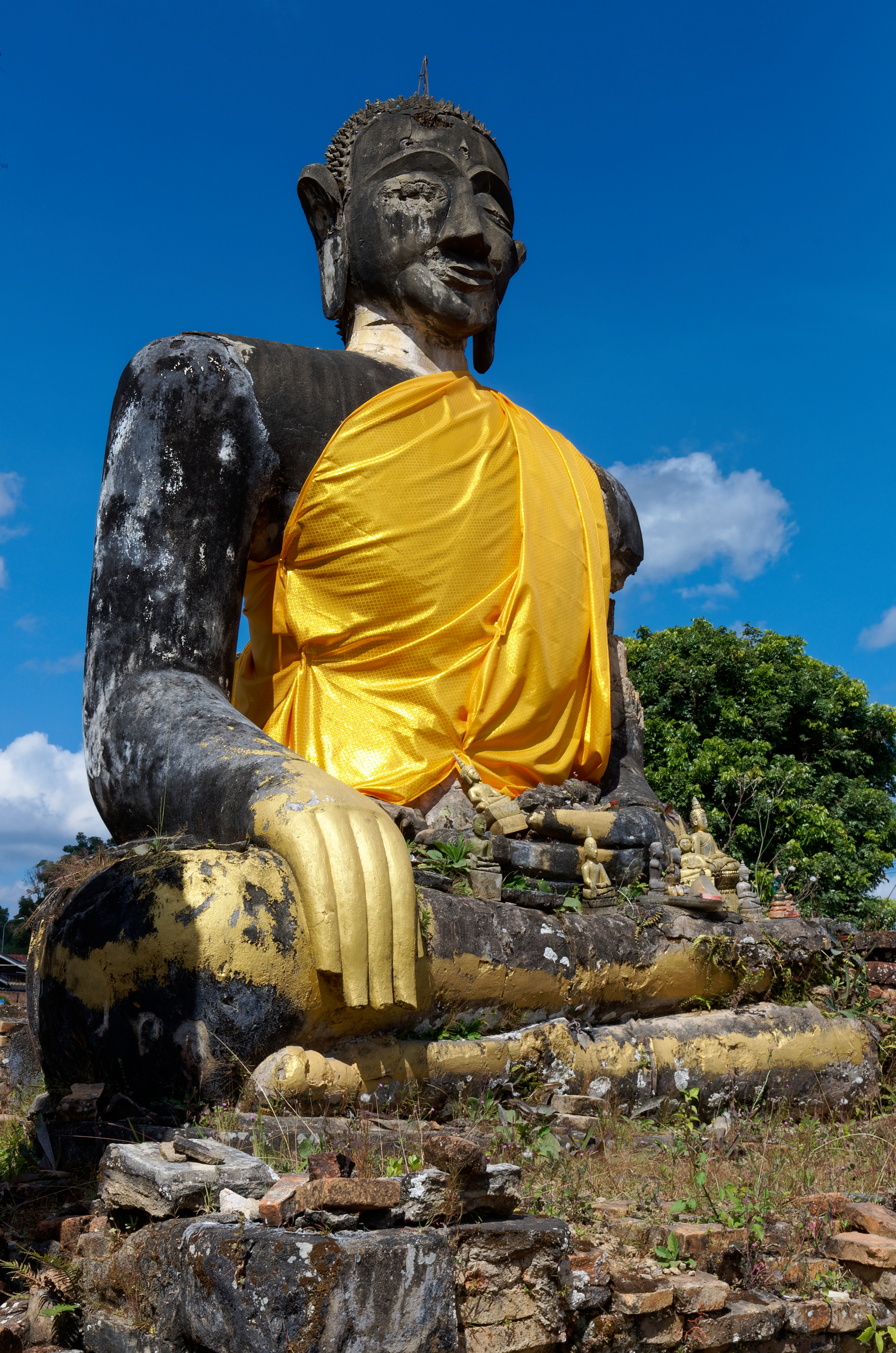

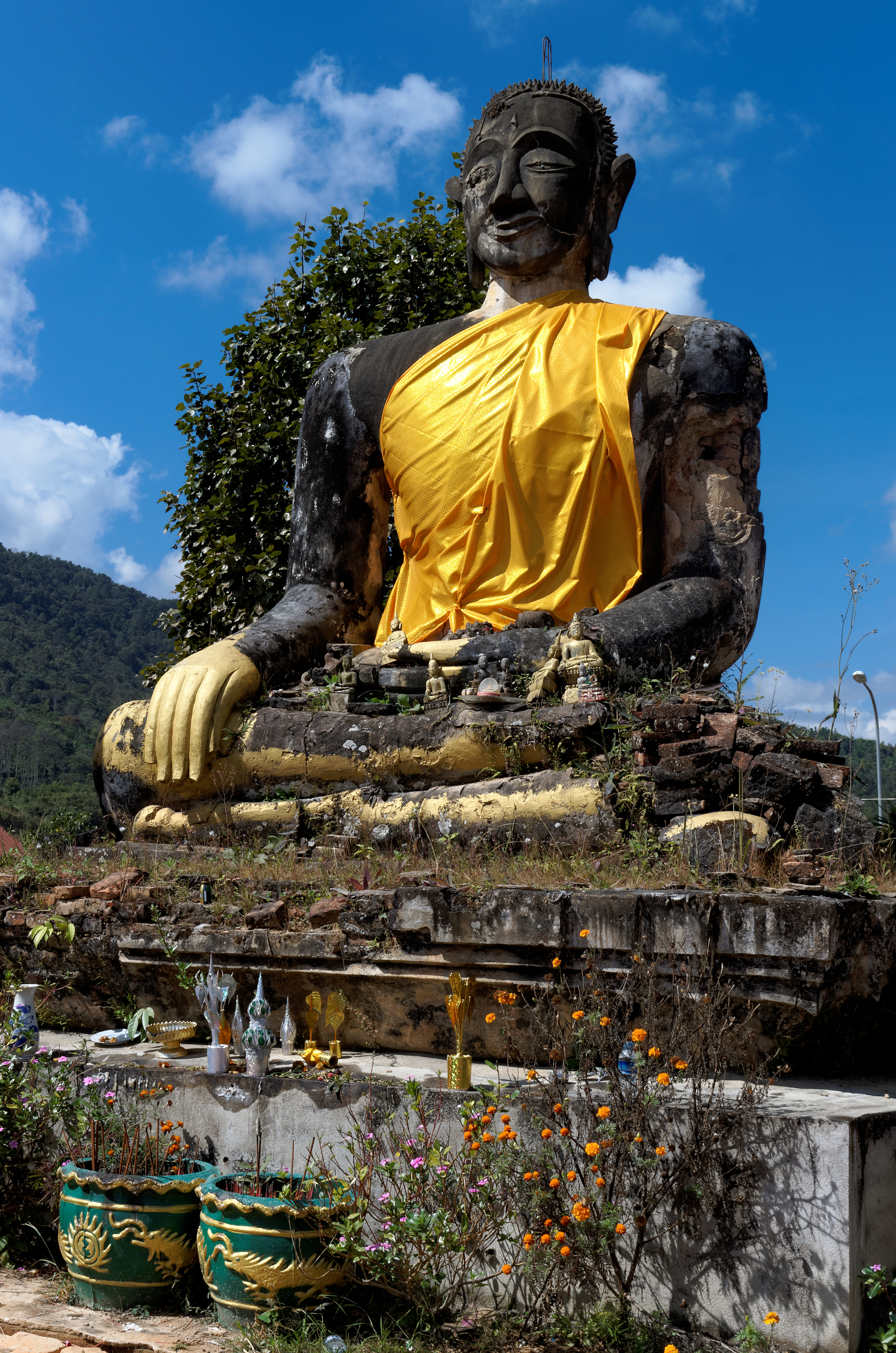

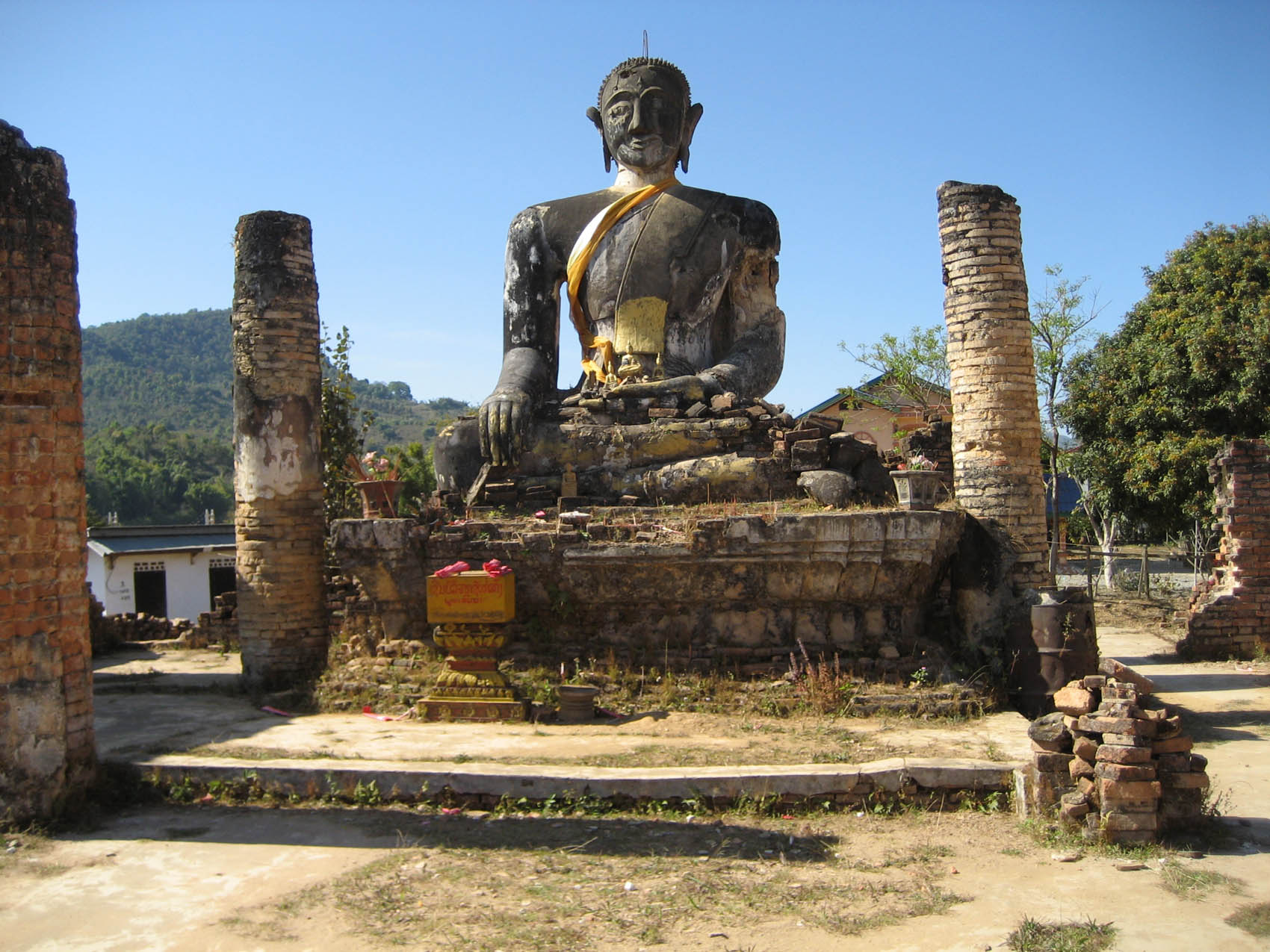

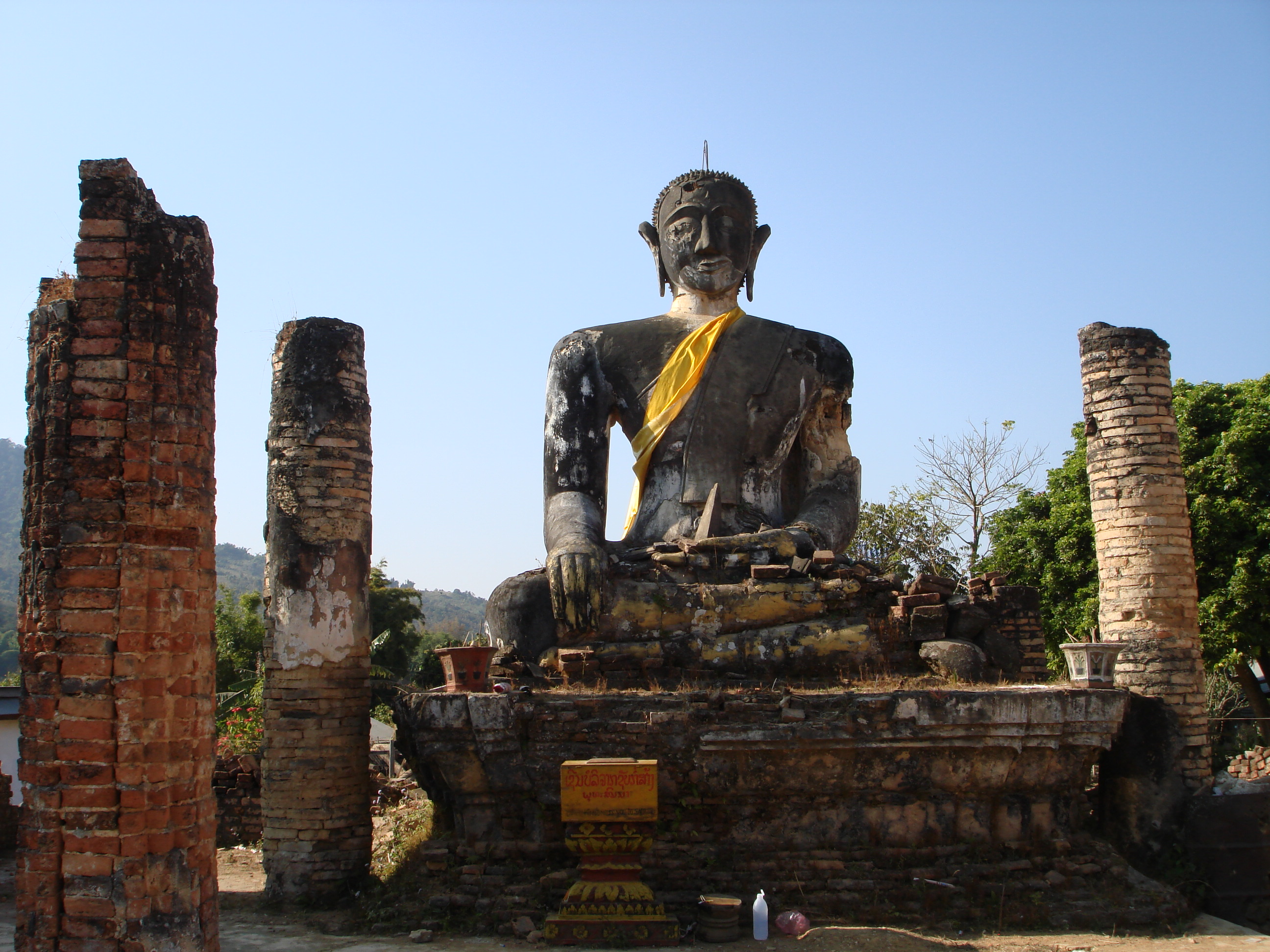
