= Pak Lay =

Town in Sainyabuli Province, Laos

Pak Lay is a town in Sainyabuli Province, in the west of Laos. It is built around a sandy road, so people can get there by bus from Vientiane or Sainyabuli. It is popular for tourists because there are opportunities of free walking through the rainforest or riding on elephants.
