= Xiangkhouang =

Province of Laos

Xiangkhouang Province ແຂວງ ຊຽງຂວາງ
- Province
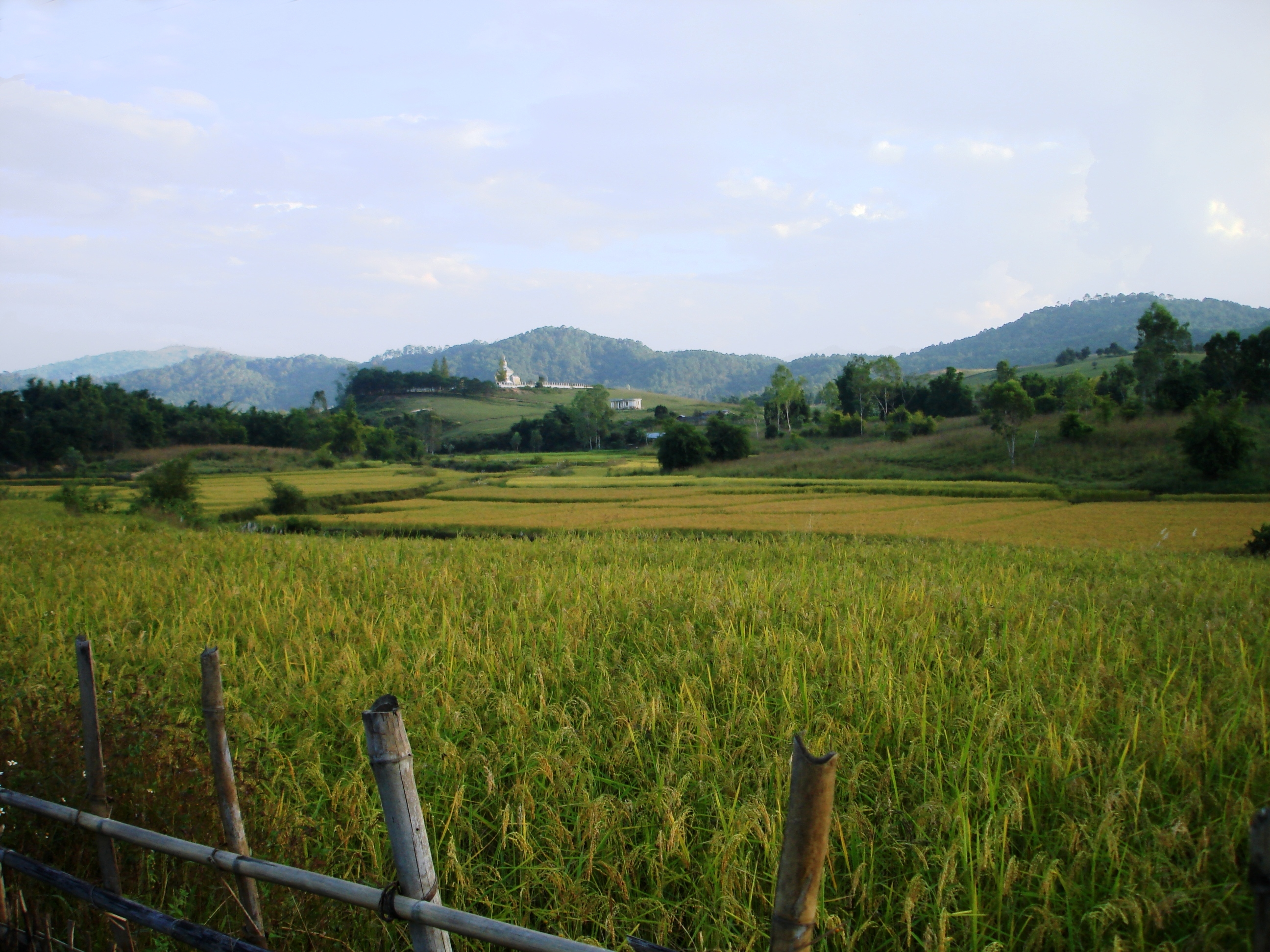
- Phonsavan Hills

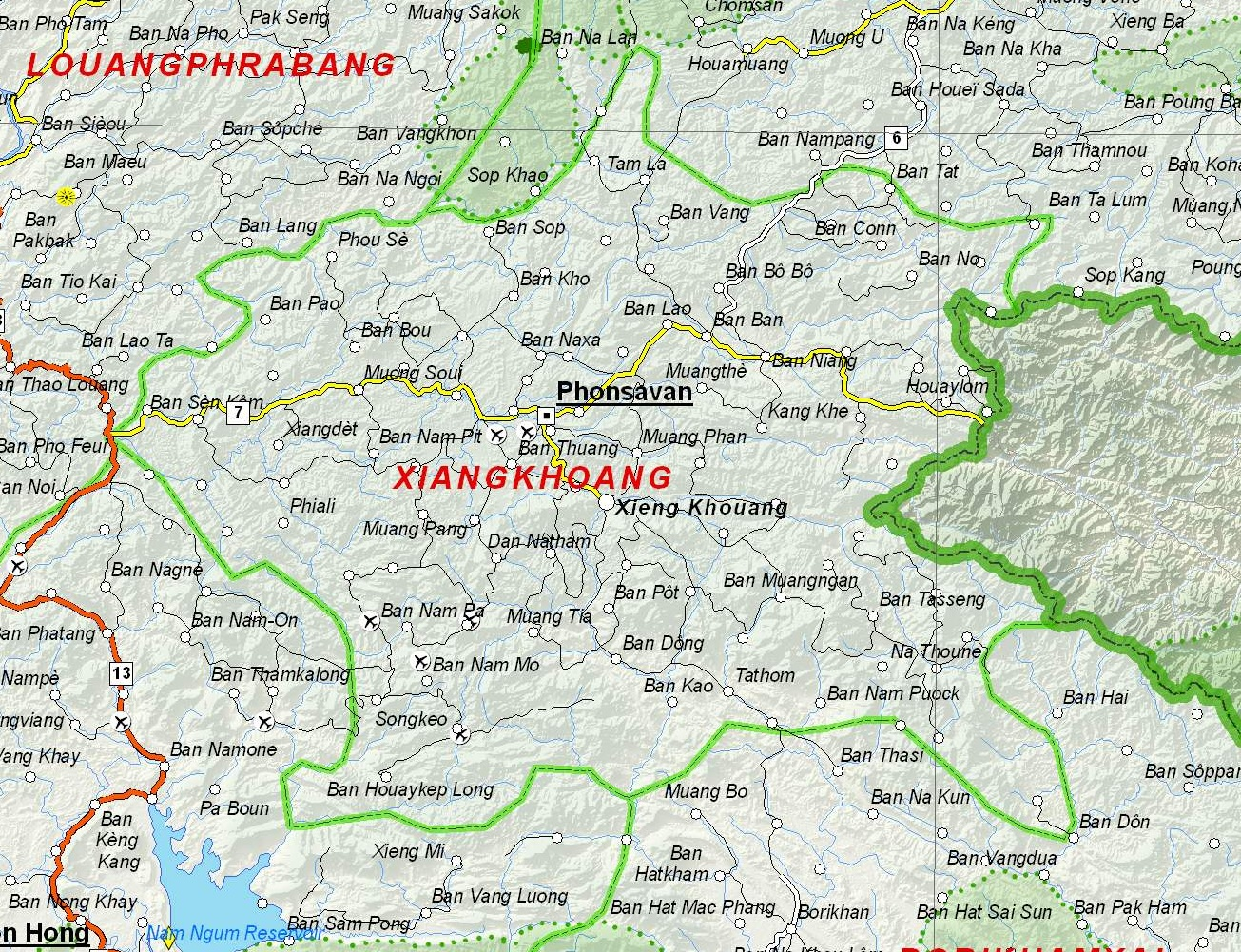
- Map of Xiangkhouang province

- Location of Xiangkhouang province in Laos
- Coordinates: 19°25′0″N 103°30′0″E
- Country: Laos
- Capital: Phonsavan

Area
  - Total: 14,751 km^{2} (5,695 sq mi)

Population (2020 census)
  - Total: 267,172
  - Density: 18.112/km^{2} (46.910/sq mi)
- Time zone: UTC+7 (ICT)
- ISO 3166 code: LA-XI
- HDI (2022): ▲0.647 medium · 4th

Xiangkhouang (Lao: ຊຽງຂວາງ, meaning 'Horizontal City'), also spelled Siang Khuang, is a province of Laos on the Xiangkhoang Plateau. It has the distinction of being the most heavily bombed place on Earth. Historically, the province was formerly the independent principality of Muang Phuan. Its later capital is Phonsavan. The population of the province as of the 2015 census was 244,684. The province's Plain of Jars was designated as a UNESCO World Heritage Site in 2019.

== History ==
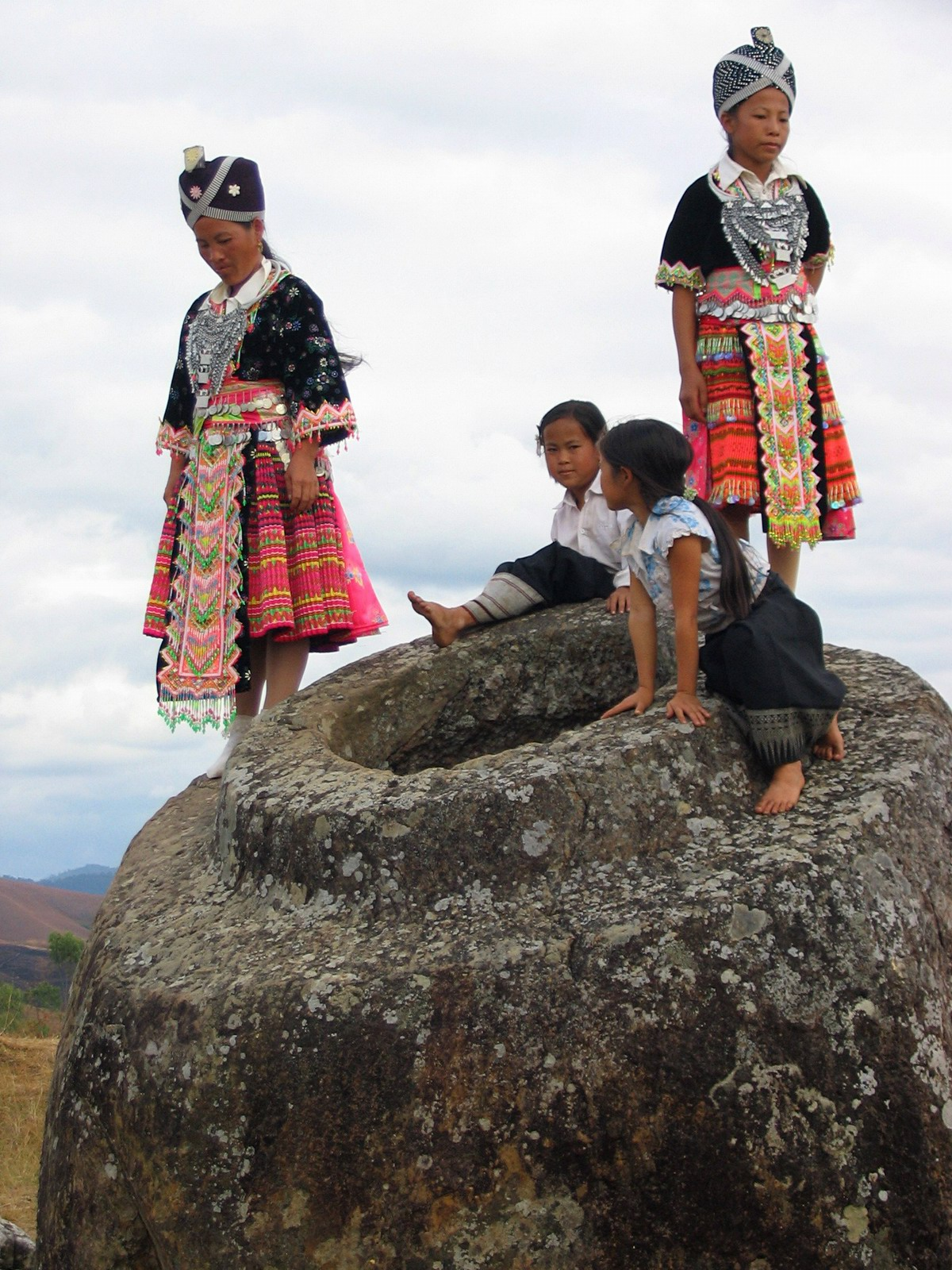
Plain of Jars, women and girls of Houang

The Tai Phuan or Phuan people are a Buddhist Tai-Lao ethnic group that migrated to Laos from southern China. According to the Pongsawadan Meuang Puan ("Muang Puan Chronicles"), they were the first people who migrated in the 13th century from China to settle this province, forming the independent principality of Muang Phuan on the Plain of Jars, with Xieng Khouang (contemporary Muang Khoun) as its capital. They established an overland trade in metals and forest products with India and China; the Xieng Khouang Plateau was the center of trade for an area of upland Southeast Asia, extending as far as Da Nang in Vietnam, Samrong Sen in Cambodia, the Khorat Plateau in northeast Thailand, and the North Cachar Hills of northeastern India. In the 14th century, Muang Phuan was subsumed into the Lan Xang kingdom under King Fa Ngum. Siamese invasions in 1777–1779, 1834–1836, and 1875–1876 sought to resettle the Phuan population into regions under firm Siamese control.

In the 1890s, the province came under French colonial rule following the 1893 Franco-Siamese crisis. During the Second Indochina War of the 1960s and 1970s, the province was a battleground in the Laotian Civil War, fought between royalist forces and the communist Pathet Lao until 1975, when the Pathet Lao emerged victorious and seized power over all of Laos. Xiangkhouang was the Laotian province most bombed by the United States Air Force in support of royalist forces led by Hmong general Vang Pao, who was born in the province. As a result of this extensive air campaign, Muong Khoun, the original capital of the province, was virtually razed to the ground, resulting in the capital being moved to Phonsavan. During the wars, most of the 16th–19th century temples were completely destroyed, with only Wat Phia Wat temple having partially survived.

== Geography ==
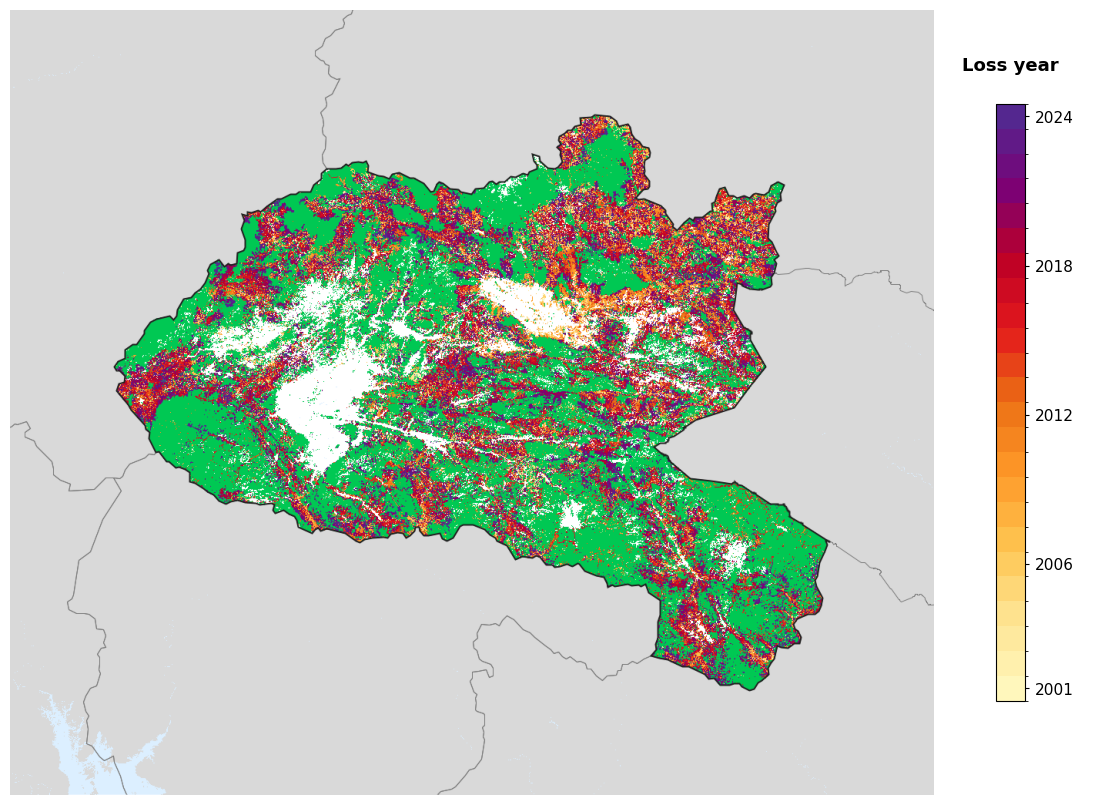
Tree-cover loss year in Xiangkhouang, 2001-2024, from the Global Forest Change dataset.

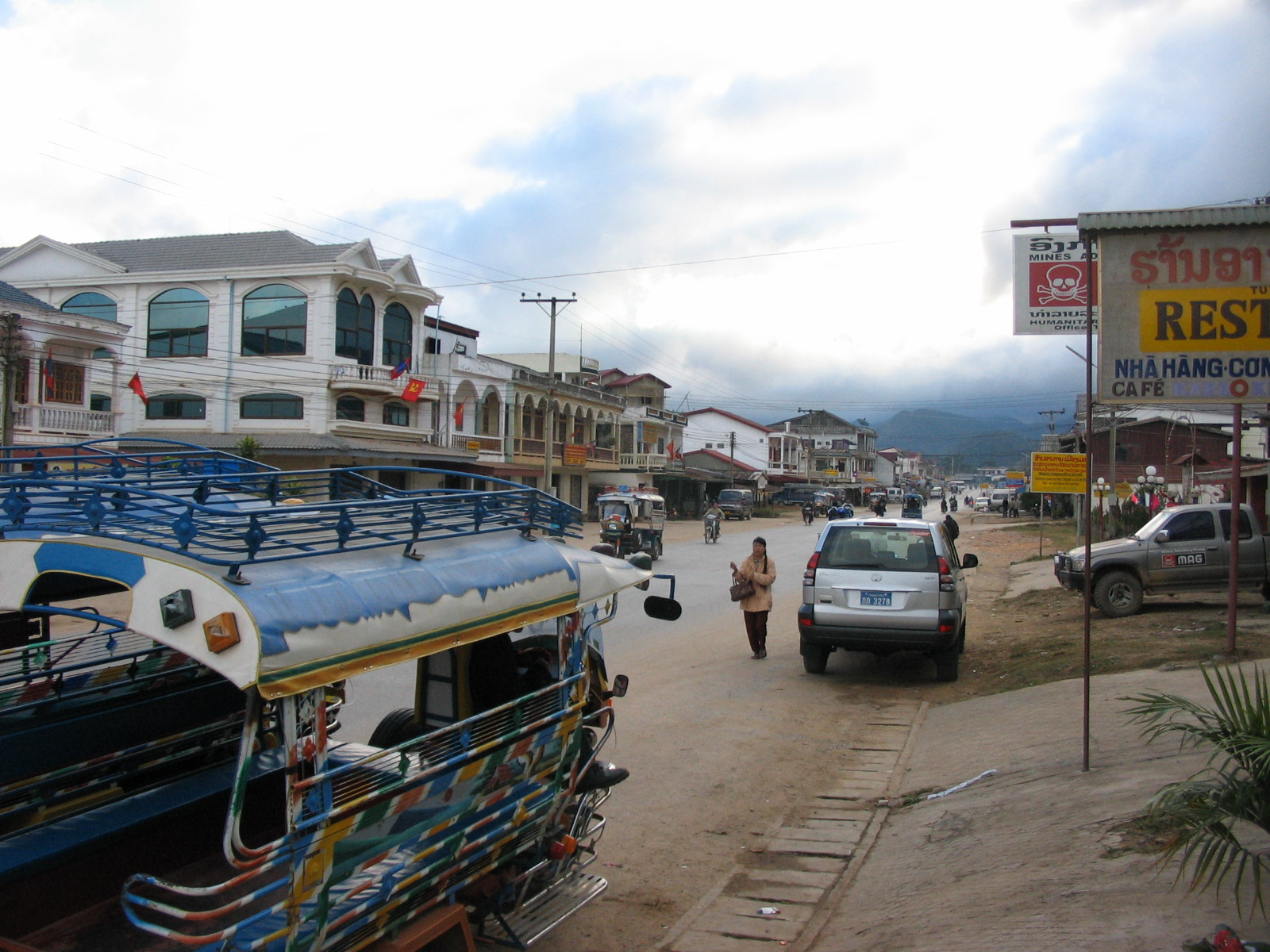
Phonsavan

Xiangkhouang province covers an area of 15,880 square kilometres (6,130 sq mi) and has a mostly mountainous topography. It borders Luang Prabang province to the northwest, Houaphanh province to the northeast, Vietnam to the east, Bolikhamsai province to the southeast, and Vientiane province to the southwest. The capital is Phonsavan. Xiangkhouang and Vientiane provinces are part of the Nam Ngum River watershed.

Apart from floodplains, the largest expanse of level land in the country is on the province's Xiangkhoang Plateau. This area is characterized by rolling hills and grassland whose elevation averages 1,300 metres (4,300 ft). The country's highest peak, Phou Bia (2,820 metres (9,250 ft)), rises at the southern side of the plateau, while the Plain of Jars is at the plateau's centre.

The province is 400 km northeast of Vientiane. Phou Bia, at 2,700 m elevation, is the highest peak in the province, and the highest in Laos. The capital city is at an elevation of about 1,000 m above mean sea level (AMSL), with Kham District in a low-laying basin at an elevation of about 600 m AMSL.

=== Protected areas ===
Nam Et-Phou Louey is a National Biodiversity Conservation Area (NBCA) which covers an area of 5,959 km^{2} in Xiangkhouang, Houaphanh, and Luang Prabang provinces. The park consists mainly of mountains and hills, with elevations ranging between 336 and 2257 metres. The area is the source of some rivers. It is named after the Nam Et River and Phou Louey ("Forever") Mountain.

The area has endangered species including tiger, leopard, clouded leopard, Asian golden cat, marbled cat, civet, gaur, Sambar deer, white-cheeked gibbon, sun bear, black bear, Asian elephant, dhole, hornbill and three species of otter.

=== Administrative divisions ===
The province is composed of eight districts which cover a total land area of 15,880 square kilometres (6,130 sq mi).

Map	Code	Name	Lao script
	09-01	Pek District (Phonsavan)	ເມືອງແປກ
	09-02	Kham District	ເມືອງຄຳ
	09-03	Nong Het District	ເມືອງໜອງແຮດ
	09-04	Khoune District	ເມືອງຄູນ
	09-05	Mok May District	ເມືອງໝອກໃໝ່
	09-06	Phou Kout District	ເມືອງພູກູດ
	09-07	Phaxay District	ເມືອງຜາໄຊ

== Economy ==
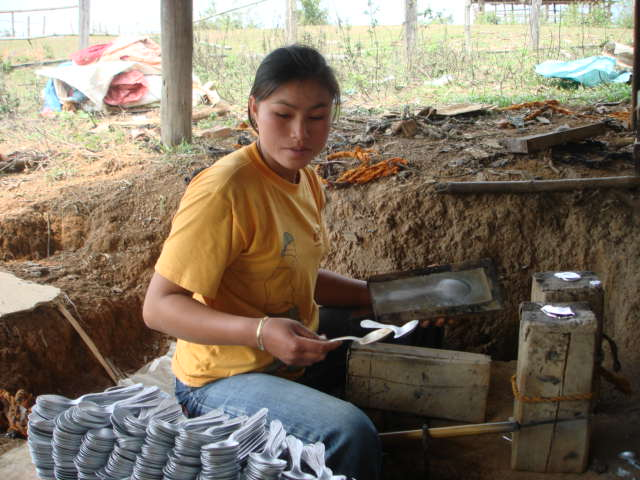
A spoon seller, Ban Napia

Xiangkhouang province is the main maize-producing area of Laos. The centre for trade and tourism is Phonsavan. In the village of Ban Napia near Phonsavan, villagers re-use scrap metal from unexploded ordnance (UXO) to make spoons to be sold as souvenirs. The scrap metal is checked for safety beforehand by UXO Lao. This community-based project provides income for the villagers. As of 2012, three accidents involving UXO had been reported.

== Ethnic groups ==
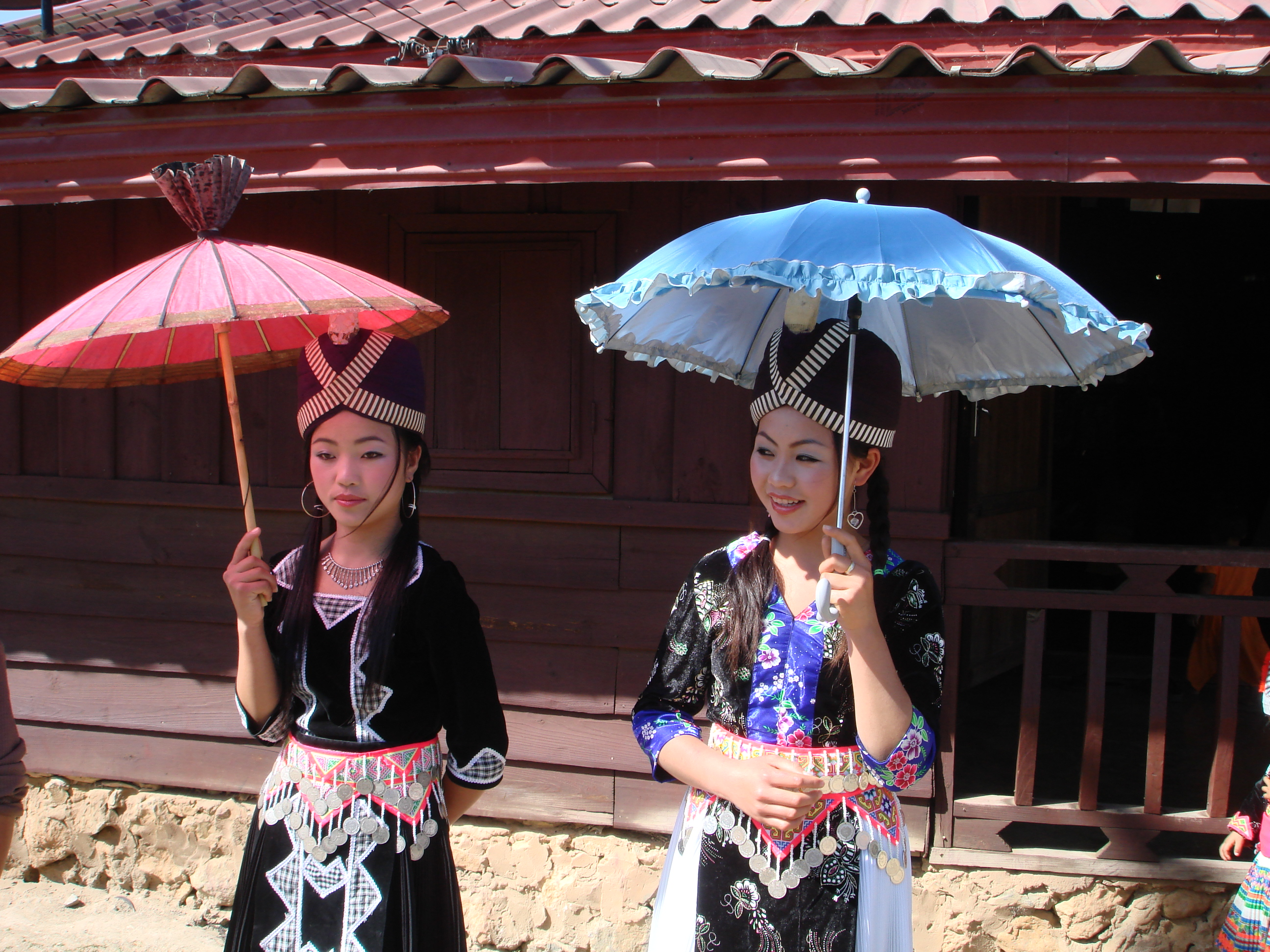
Hmong girls

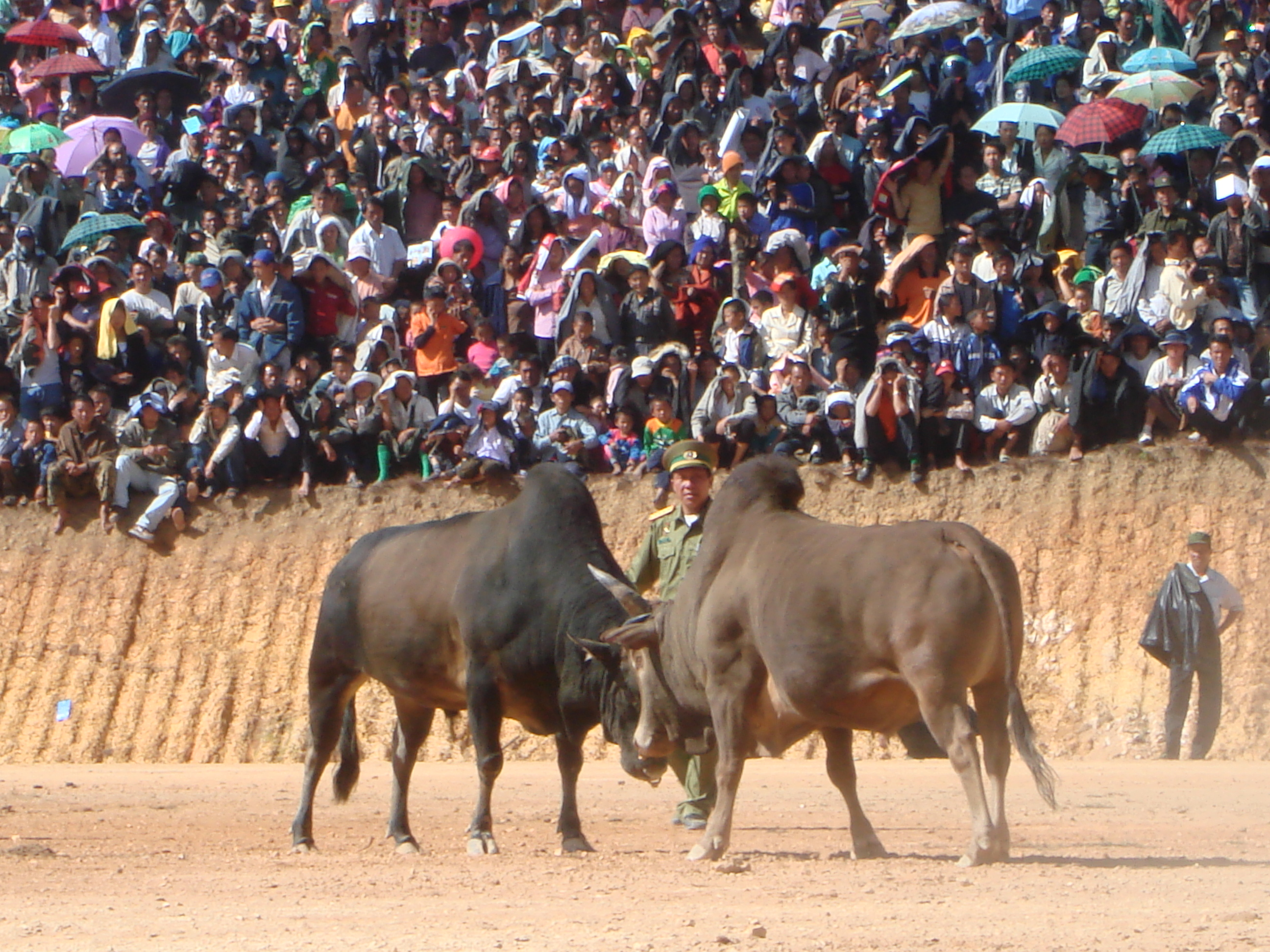
Bullfight, Hmong New Year

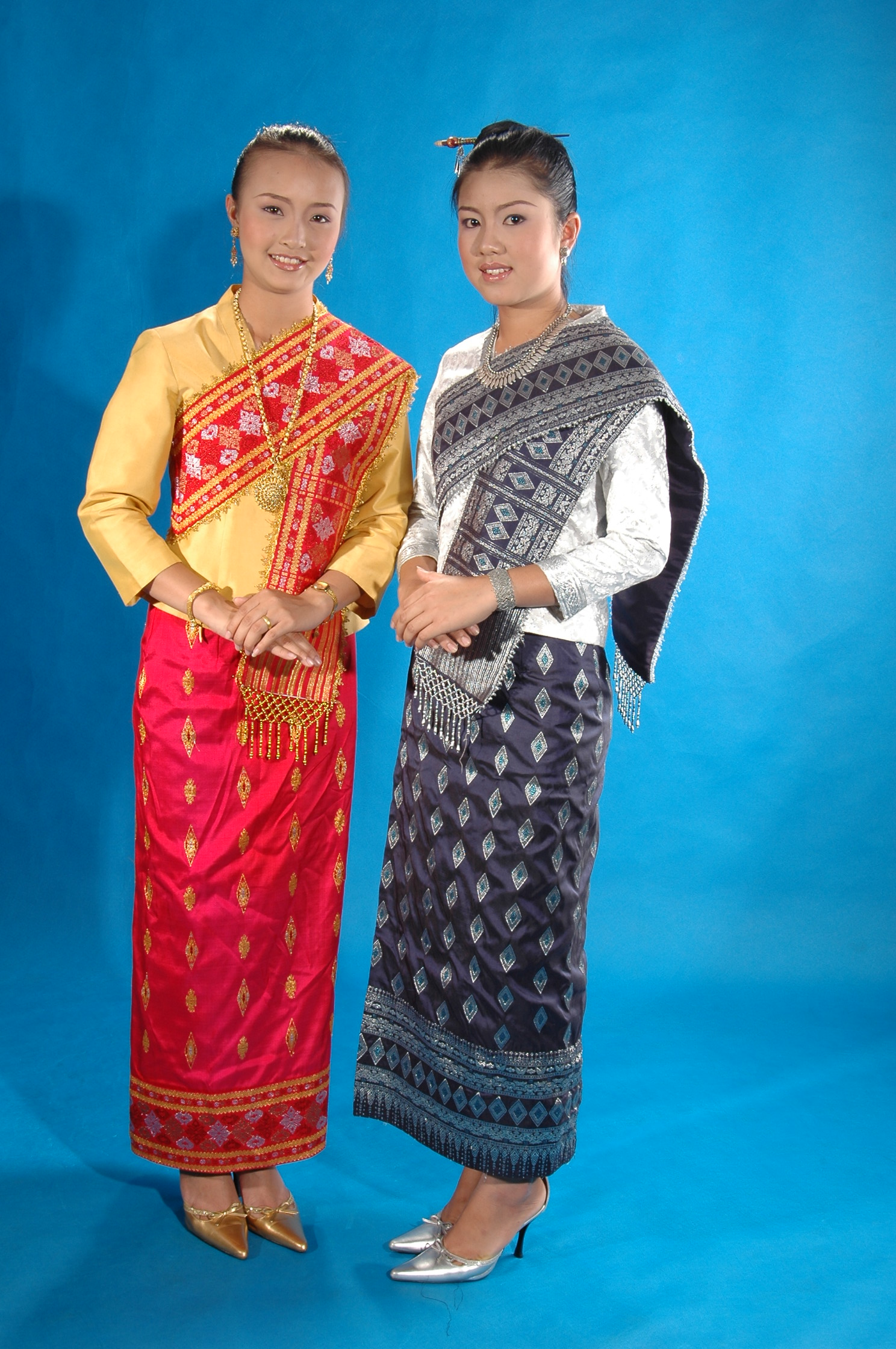
Phuan girls in traditional clothing

=== Tai Dam ===
Tai Dam, Tai Daeng and Tai Phuan belong to the Tai language family, spoken by 60% of the national population. The Tai Dam migrated from northern Vietnam to Laos 80–300 years ago. They are not Buddhists. Instead, they practice a form of ancestor and spirit worship. Tai Dam are producers of silk and cotton textiles and some women export to overseae markets. Older Tai Dam women wear the traditional blue indigo cotton shirt, skirt, and black turban woven with colored patterns. They produce rice alcohol, called lao lao that is consumed socially and used for ritual purposes. Tai Dam settled in upland valleys near streams and irrigable and accessible plains scattered among Lao and Phuan villages. They built rectangular symmetric houses on pilings, with a rice granary under the house. Villages are composed of 15¬60 houses and are not fenced. The people subsist on wet rice, vegetables, poultry, weaving, sewing and hunting.

The ancestors of the Tai Phuan once founded the kingdom of the same name.

=== Khmu ===
Part of the Mon-Khmer branch of the Austro-Asiatic linguistic family, the Khmu settled in the area some thousand years ago. Khmu houses are built on stilts. Each village has a communal house where men gather for political discussions, or work together on basket making and other crafts. Like some ethnic groups in Laos, the Khmu practice their own form of animism. They are known for their skill at making baskets, fish traps, and other objects from bamboo. Their material culture, their tools, utensils, baskets and netbags reflect their continued reliance on the forest. Growing rice, hunting, gathering forest products and producing handicrafts provide some cash income. They distill lao hai ("jar alcohol").

=== Hmong ===
Hmong people migrated from China to Laos between 1800 and 1900. Having a desire for independence, they rebelled against Chinese attempts to control and settle them and fled in successive waves southwards. During the Lao Civil war in the 1960s and 1970s, Hmong were recruited by the CIA's "Secret Army", commanded by Hmong General Vang Pao. Hmong villages were relocated in free-fire zones, and some died during these evacuations or due to fighting. When the communists came to power in 1975, tens of thousands of Hmong fled to Thailand or emigrated to the US. The Hmong accounts for 6-10% of the total population of Laos, and remain most numerous and concentrated in eastern Xiangkhouang. In the province the White Hmong, the Striped Hmong, and the Green Hmong can be distinguished. A way to differentiate these groups is by looking at the women's dresses.

Hmong live in forested mountains between 800 and 1,500 meters elevation, and in Laos they are categorized as Lao Soung ("highland people"). Hmong villages range in size from 15 to over 60 houses; they are not fenced and are organized by clan. The rectangular houses are on beaten soil and have one room without windows. The walls are made of vertical wood planks and bamboo and a thatched roof. Hmong are known for their knowledge of the forest, herbal medicines, and expertise in raising animals. Their agricultural system is based on rain-fed slope cultivation with slash-and-burn techniques. They live on rice, corn and vegetable production, swine and poultry husbandry, gathering, hunting, embroidery, and basket work.

Their religion is a form of shamanistic animism with a cult of ancestors and spirits, and a belief in three souls. Certain spirits protect the people within the village boundaries, while others maintain their influence over the plant and animal kingdom outside the village.

Hmong women are known for their embroidery and weaving. Traditionally, clothes are made from hemp and cotton. Batik is used only by Green Hmong for their skirts. Before dying, the cloth the pattern is marked with wax. The wax is then removed to reveal the pattern. The wax is applied with a batik pen and the design is completed square by square. Some geometric patterns exist and are passed on from mother to daughter. The material is pleated by running a sharp-edged stone along the pleat lines on alternate sides of the cloth, and sewing the poles into place at the waistband. These skirts and some other items of Hmong clothing are embroidered. Embroidery and applique is a social activity, a time for women to sit together and exchange views and news.

Hmong New Year celebrations in December, starting from the 15th day of the ascending moon, are accompanied by activities including top-spinning competitions, dances, songs, and bull fights. It is one of the occasions for finding a wife or a husband. Men and women toss the makkono, a fabric ball, as part of a courting ritual which can go on for hours. During the festivities, Hmong women wear their traditional dresses, adorned with embroidery and silver jewelry.

== Landmarks ==
The tourism department of Laos has listed 63 "notable landmarks" in the province. 32 are natural sites, 18 are cultural sites, and 13 are historical sites. Of these, some are the following:

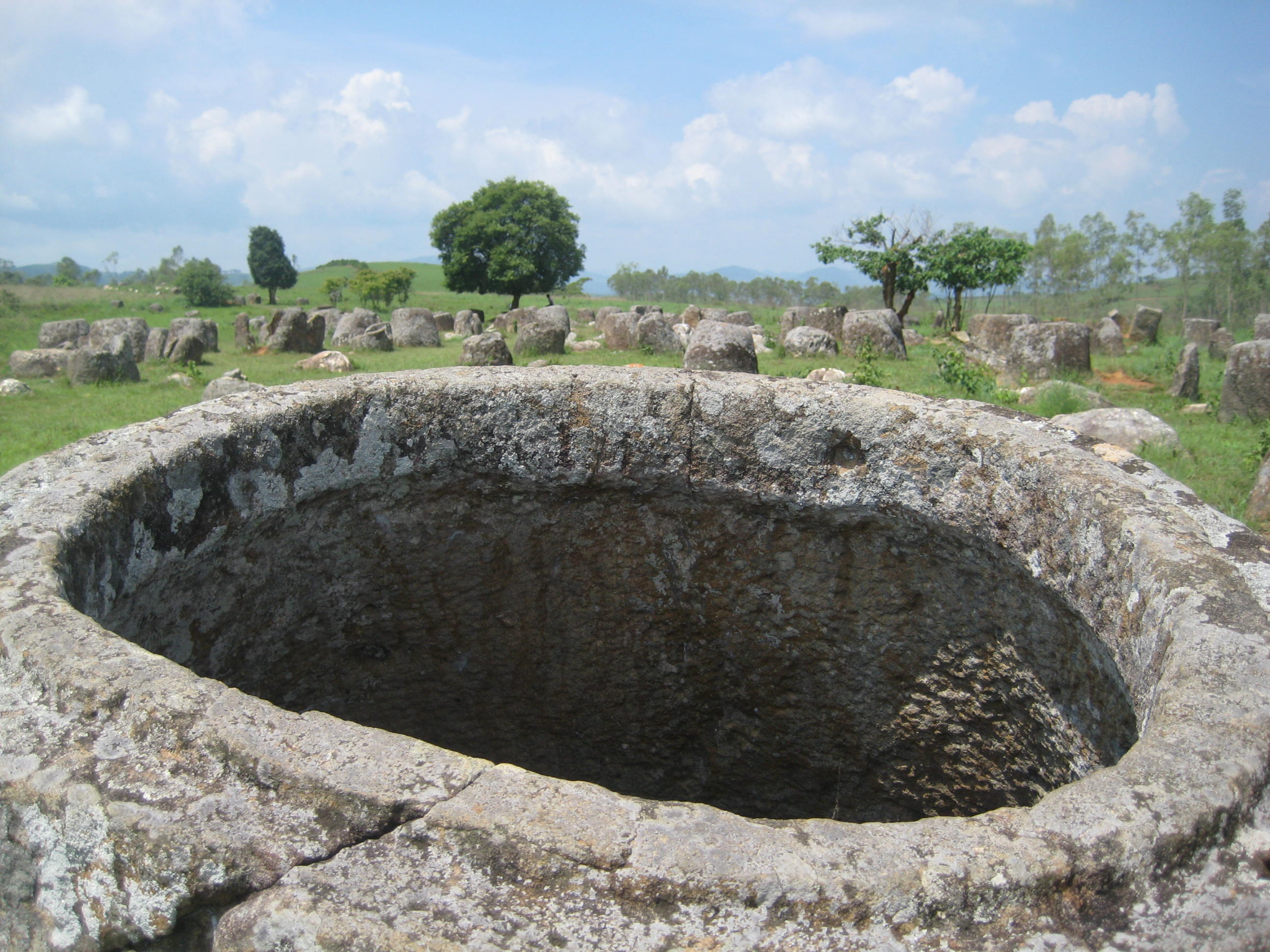
Plain of Jars archaeological site 1

The first landmark is the Plain of Jars. The "jars" are 2,100 tubular-shaped megalithic stone jars used for funerary purposes. The jars range from 1–3 metres (3 ft 3 in – 9 ft 10 in) in height. They are found throughout the province in clusters containing from one to some hundred jars each. The jars date from the Iron Age (500 BCE–500 CE). Nearest to Phonsavan is Jar Site 1, with an area of 25 hectares (ha). The largest jar found here is 2.5 m x 2.5 m, while the rest are half this size. One jar has decorations on it. The megalithic jar sites of Xiangkhouang were inscribed on UNESCO's list of World Heritage Sites in July 2019.

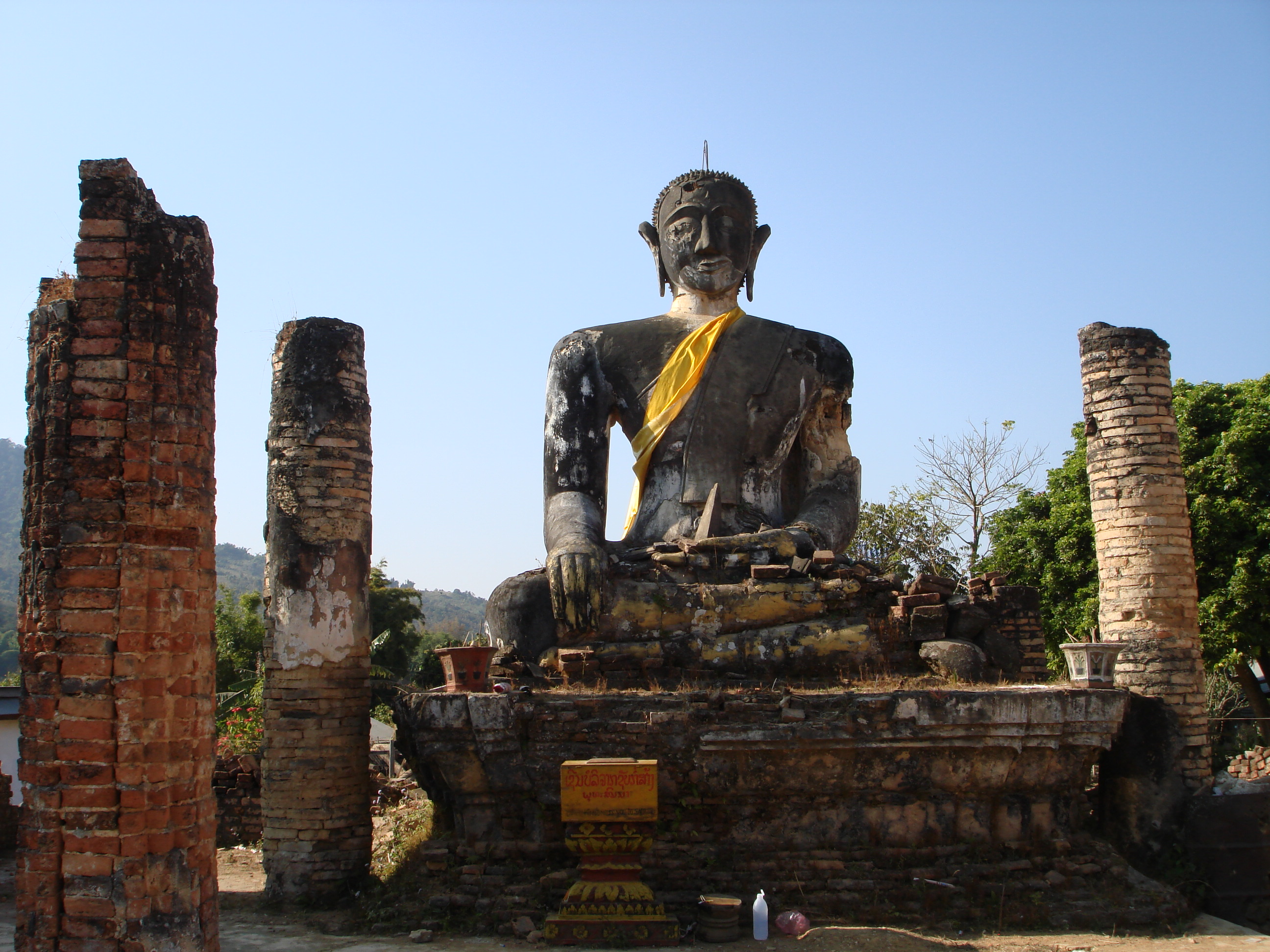
The ruins of Wat Phia Wat Temple and its Buddha statue, which was almost completely destroyed during the First and Second Indochina Wars

Muang Khoun was the capital of the Phuan Kingdom of the 14th century. It is southeast of Phonsavan. At the Wat Phia Wat Temple, destroyed during the conflicts of the First Indochina War (1946–1954) and the Second Vietnam War (1955–1975), the ruins of a stone wall with brick archways, relics of French colonial rule of over this part of Laos and from the whole country, a statue of Buddha, broken pillars and sections of walls remain and are visible and accessible. Once buried in the tropical forest, the That Foun stupa, dating back some 450 years, can be seen near the road outside Phonsavan. In an ethnic village of the Phuan, to the south of Phonsavan, Ban Napi mounds of war scrap can be seen buried in tableware. During the 1980s, eight families came together and assembled bits and pieces of aluminum from damaged, crashed or shot-down United States Air Force aircraft, and aircraft from US-aligned air forces (such as the Royal Lao Air Force) in mounds of melted metal, lack, wood and ash. Such war debris and wreckage can be found scattered between the Lang Waterfall and Jar Site 3 of the Plain of Jars.

A secret tunnel was constructed below the hills of the Phu Kheng Jar Quarry Site during the Second Indochina War. The tunnel is 70 metres (230 ft) in length and 1.6 metres (5 ft 3 in) in height. Reinforced-concrete bunkers with night-camps are visible nearby.

== See also ==
- Ban Phou Pheung Noi
