= Muang Saiapoun =

- Town
- Location within Laos
- Coordinates: 18°24′5″N 101°30′26″E
- Country: Laos
- Province: Sainyabuli Province
- Time zone: UTC+7 (Laos Standard Time)

Muang Saiapoun is a river town in Sainyabuli Province, Laos, situated along the main road (Route 4), south of Phon Ngam. The town is located 35.7km from the Thailand border.
