= Sainyabuli province =

Province of Laos

Xayabuli province ແຂວງ ໄຊຍະບູລີ
- Province
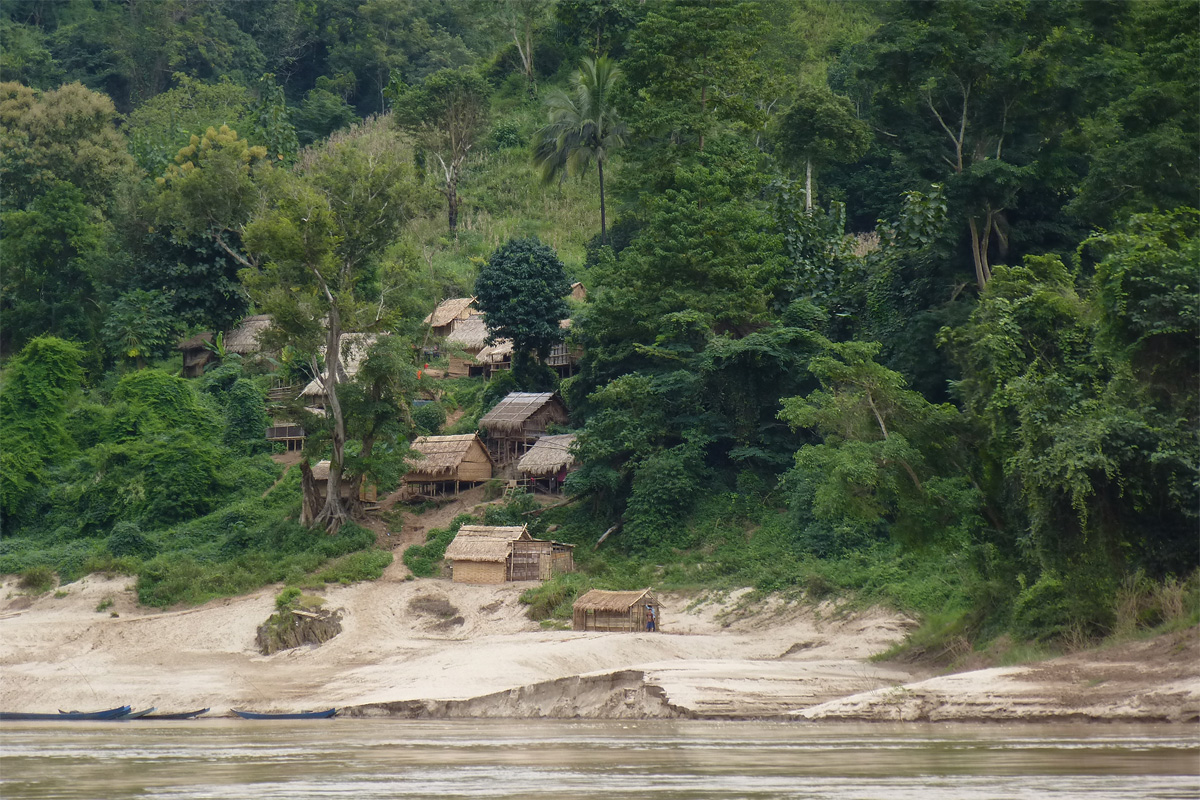
- Village on the Mekong

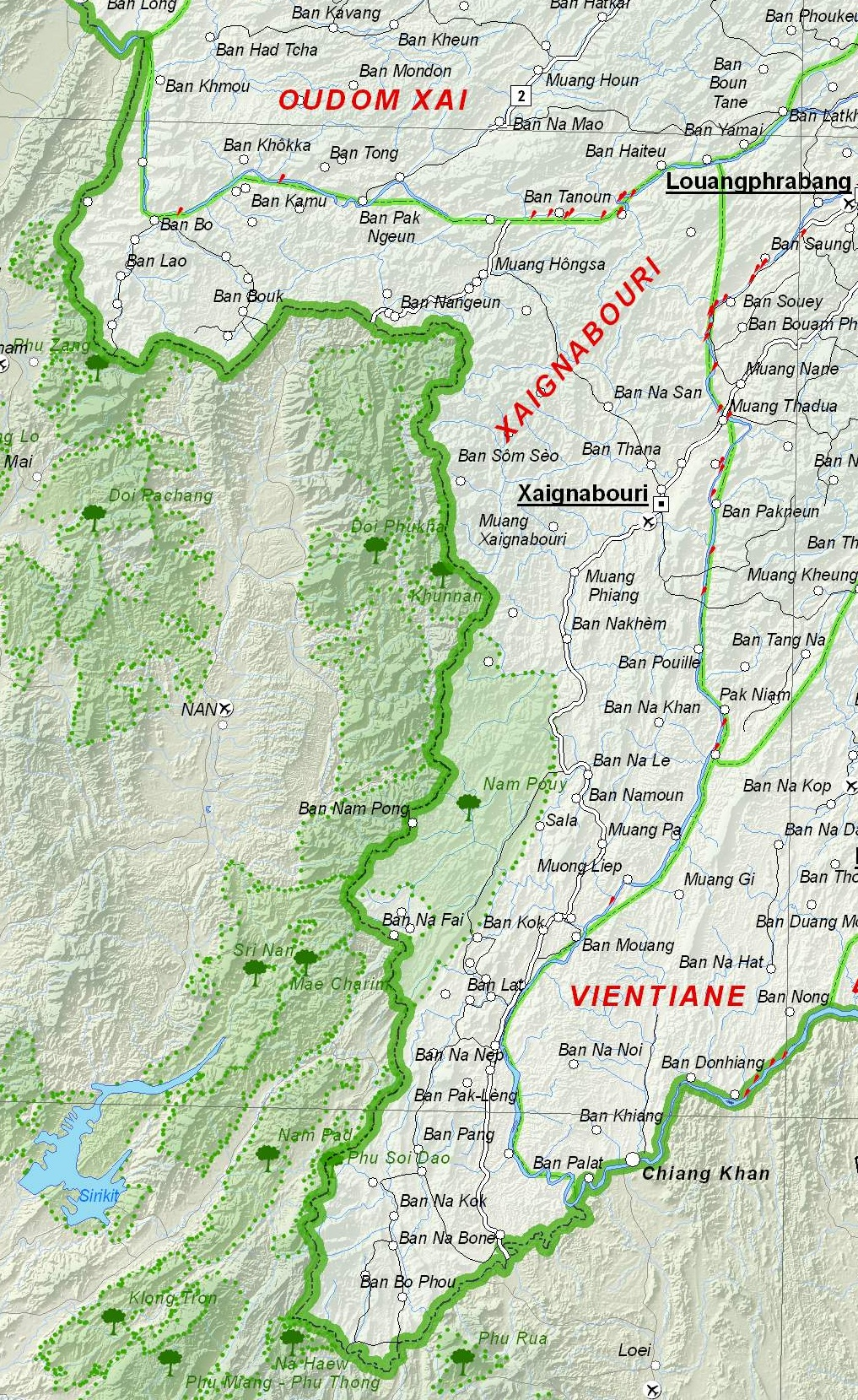
- Map of Xayabuli province

- Location of Xayabuli province in Laos
- Coordinates: 19.25°N 101.75°E
- Country: Laos
- Capital: Sainyabuli

Area
  - Total: 16,389 km^{2} (6,328 sq mi)

Population (2020 census)
  - Total: 423,496
  - Density: 25.840/km^{2} (66.926/sq mi)
- Time zone: UTC+7 (ICT)
- ISO 3166 code: LA-XA
- HDI (2022): ▲0.675 medium · 2nd

Sainyabuli province (Lao: ໄຊຍະບູລີ, pronounced [sáj.ɲā.bùː.líː]; alternate spellings: Xayabuli, Xaignabouri, Xayaboury, Sayabouli, Sayabouri) is a province in northwest Laos. The capital of the province is the town of Saiyabuli. Saiyabuli is the only Lao province that is completely west of the Mekong River.

== Geography ==
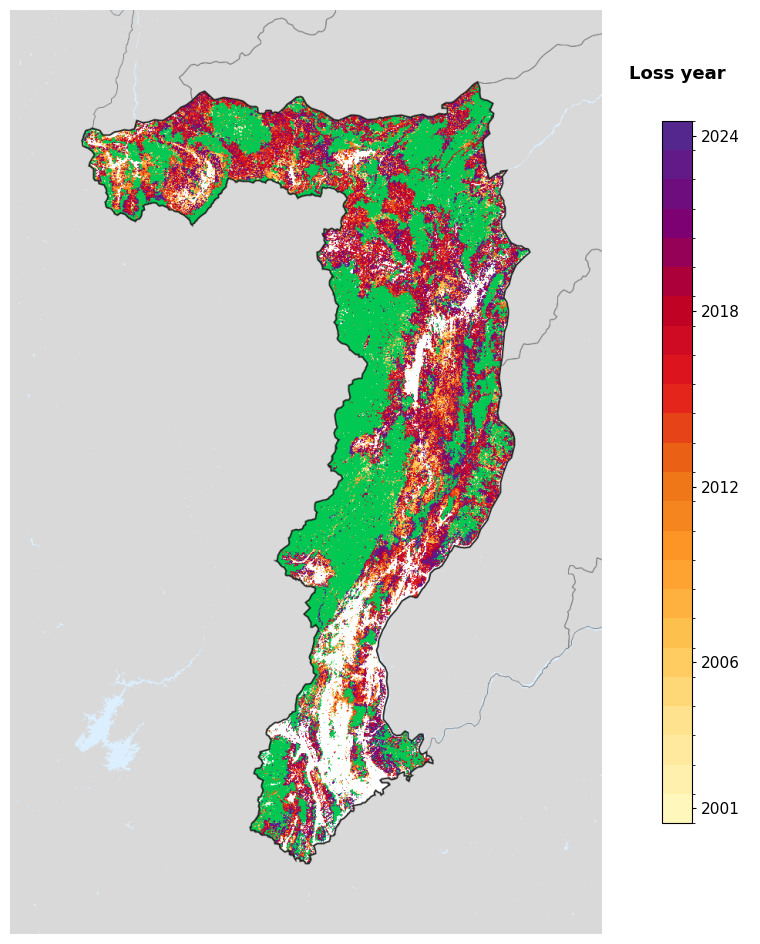
Tree-cover loss year in Sainyabuli, 2001-2024, from the Global Forest Change dataset.

Sainyabuli province is in the shape of a number 7 or an upside-down-L. It covers an area of 16,389 square kilometres (6,328 sq mi). The province borders Bokeo province and Oudomxai province to the north, Luang Prabang province and Vientiane province to the east, and (from the south clockwise) the Thai provinces Loei, Phitsanulok, Uttaradit, Nan and Phayao.

The province is mountainous with the Luang Prabang Range running roughly in a north–south direction and forming a natural border with the Thai highlands. The flattest and most tropical Laotian area is the floodplain which stretches between the provinces of Sainyabuli and Champasak. There are mountain peaks of greater than 1,000 m (3,300 ft) elevation. Other features include the Pak Kimin ridge near the Nam Heung stream.

Sainyabuli province is home to approximately 75% of the nation's 560 domesticated elephants. They work in the logging industry, which causes a loss in wild and domestic elephant habitat.

Sainyabuli province is home to the annual Elephant Festival, which has been running since 2007.

=== Protected areas ===
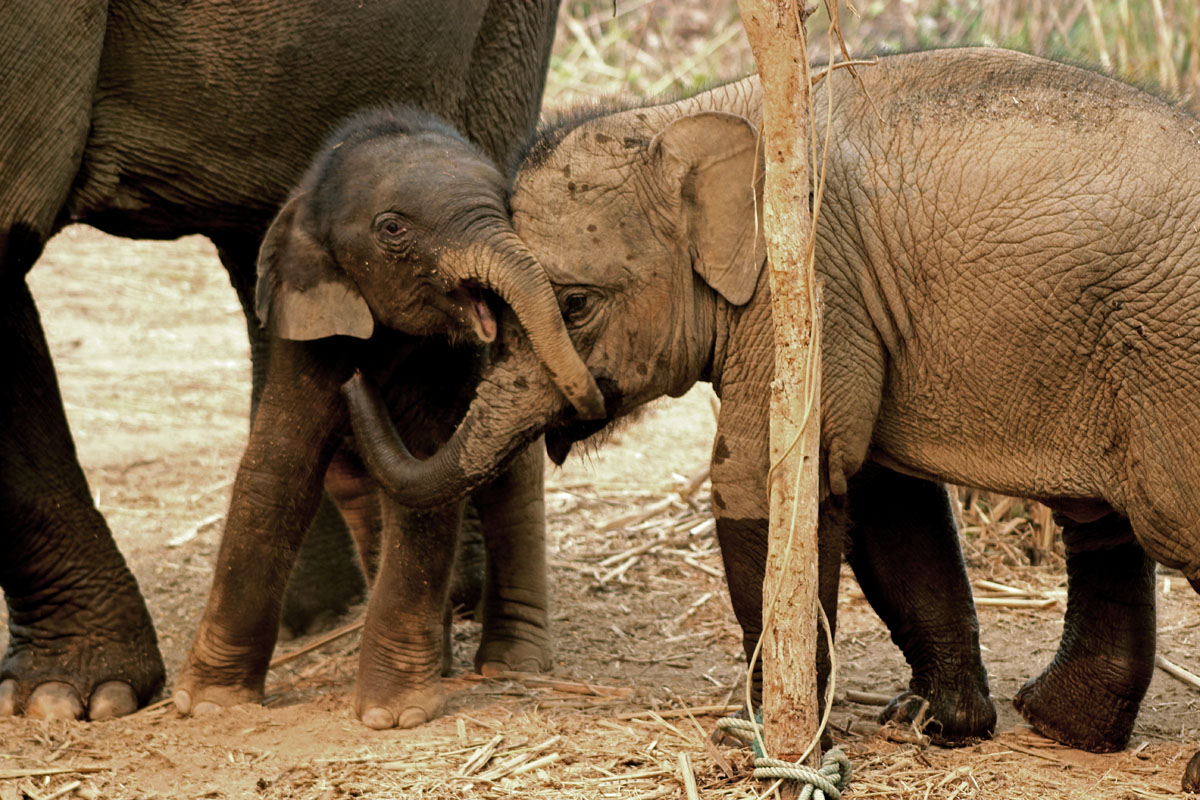
Asian elephants are the flagship species at Nam Phouy National Biodiversity Conservation Area

The Nam Phouy National Biodiversity Conservation Area (NBCA), a protected area, is home to wild elephants. The NBCA is in the forested mountains of the Luang Prabang Range close to the border with Thailand and is part of the Luang Prabang montane rain forests ecoregion. The reservoir of lower Nam Phoun Dam is partly within the Nam Phouy NBCA. In view of the concentration of the largest number of Asian elephants in the province and Laos, the Lao Elephant Conservation Center has been established in Hongsa District. The Nam Phouy NBCA, entirely in the province, is named after Nam Phouy village (or Nam Phoun). It is spread over an area of 1,912 square kilometres (738 sq mi). Hill ranges reach a maximum elevation of 1,790 metres (5,870 ft), and are part of the Luang Prabang montane rain forests on the Thai border. Geological formations include Mesozoic sandstones and shales. The habitat is characterized by mixed deciduous forest with an abundance of bamboo resulting from regular forest burning. Afzelia forms at the upper canopy with teak at lower elevations. Apart from wild elephants (about 350), gibbons, gaurs, tigers, dholes, serows, silvered langurs, Asiatic black bears, and Sumatran rhinos are the wild life species reported in the protected area. The protected area was identified by the Government of Laos in the National Elephant Conservation Meeting held in 2008 and WWF has been in the forefront in this effort since 2005.

The 10,980 hectare Upper Lao Mekong Important Bird Area (IBA) stretches across the provinces of Sainyabuli, Bokeo, and Oudomxai. It is at an elevation of 300–400 metres (980–1,310 ft). The topography is characterized by river channel, exposed beds, sandbars, gravel bars, islands, rock outcrops, bush land, and braided streams. Bird life includes black-bellied tern (Sterna acuticauda), great cormorant (Phalacrocorax carbo), grey-headed lapwing (Vanellus cinereus), Jerdon's bushchat (Saxicola jerdoni), brown-throated martin (Riparia paludicola), river lapwing (Vanellus duvaucelii), small pratincole (Glareola lactea), and swan goose (Anser cygnoides).

The 18,230 hectare Mekong Channel upstream of Vientiane Important Bird Area (IBA) is an approximately 300 kilometres (190 mi) section of the Mekong Channel upstream of Vientiane city. It overlaps two provinces: Sainyabuli and Vientiane. Topographical characteristics are braided streams, bushland, gravel bars, open sandy islands, rock outcrops, and sand bars. Recorded avifauna include wire-tailed swallow (Hirundo smithii), small pratincole (Glareola lactea), river lapwing (Vanellus duvaucelii), Jerdon's bush chat (Saxicola jerdoni), and the great thick-knee (Esacus recurvirostris).

=== Administrative divisions ===
The province is composed of the following 10 districts:

Map	Code	Name	Lao script	Population (2015)
	08-01	Xayabury District	ເມືອງໄຊຍະບູລີ	75,737
	08-02	Khop District	ເມືອງຄອບ	20,546
	08-03	Hongsa District	ເມືອງຫົງສາ	28,048
	08-04	Ngeun District	ເມືອງເງິນ	17,589
	08-05	Xienghone District	ເມືອງຊຽງຮ່ອນ	32,562
	08-06	Phiang District	ເມືອງພຽງ	57,433
	08-07	Parklai District	ເມືອງປາກລາຍ	68,215
	08-08	Kenethao District	ເມືອງແກ່ນທ້າວ	39,900
	08-09	Botene District	ເມືອງບໍ່ແຕນ	17,539
	08-10	Thongmyxay District	ເມືອງທົ່ງມີໄຊ	8,572
	08-11	Xaisathan District	ເມືອງໄຊສະຖານ	15,235

== History ==
In 1904, Siam was forced to cede the area compromising the province to the French Indochina colony. In 1941, it was annexed by Thailand under the name Lan Chang province, and was returned its pre-war colonial status in 1946. The area is allegedly the epicenter of the Laotian military's involvement in the illegal timber trade.

Since the Mekong isolated Sainuyabuli from other Laotian provinces in the Hmong community, its Hmong villages were less affected by warfare during the Laotian Civil War. Most Hmong villages in Sainyabuli saw no fighting, such as Houaysouy. Vang Pao apparently had no men recruited into the armies. After the war, Anne Fadiman, author of The Spirit Catches You and You Fall Down, said the village was "tossed into the political melee along with the rest of the country." The occupying Vietnamese soldiers regarded the residents of the village as traitors and persecuted them. In 1979 around 400 members of the Lee, Vang, Xiong, and Yang clans attempted to escape from the village. The family of Lia Lee, the subject of The Spirit Catches You and You Fall Down, originated from Houaysouy.

== Demographics ==
The Northern Lao dialect dominates the province. Residents of Hongsa (population 6,000) are predominantly Tai Lue. Other ethnic groups are the Khmu, Tai Dam, Htin, Phai, Kri, and Akha; the Malabri, who reside in the forests of western region of the province, are the last hunter-gatherers in Southeast Asia.

== Economy ==
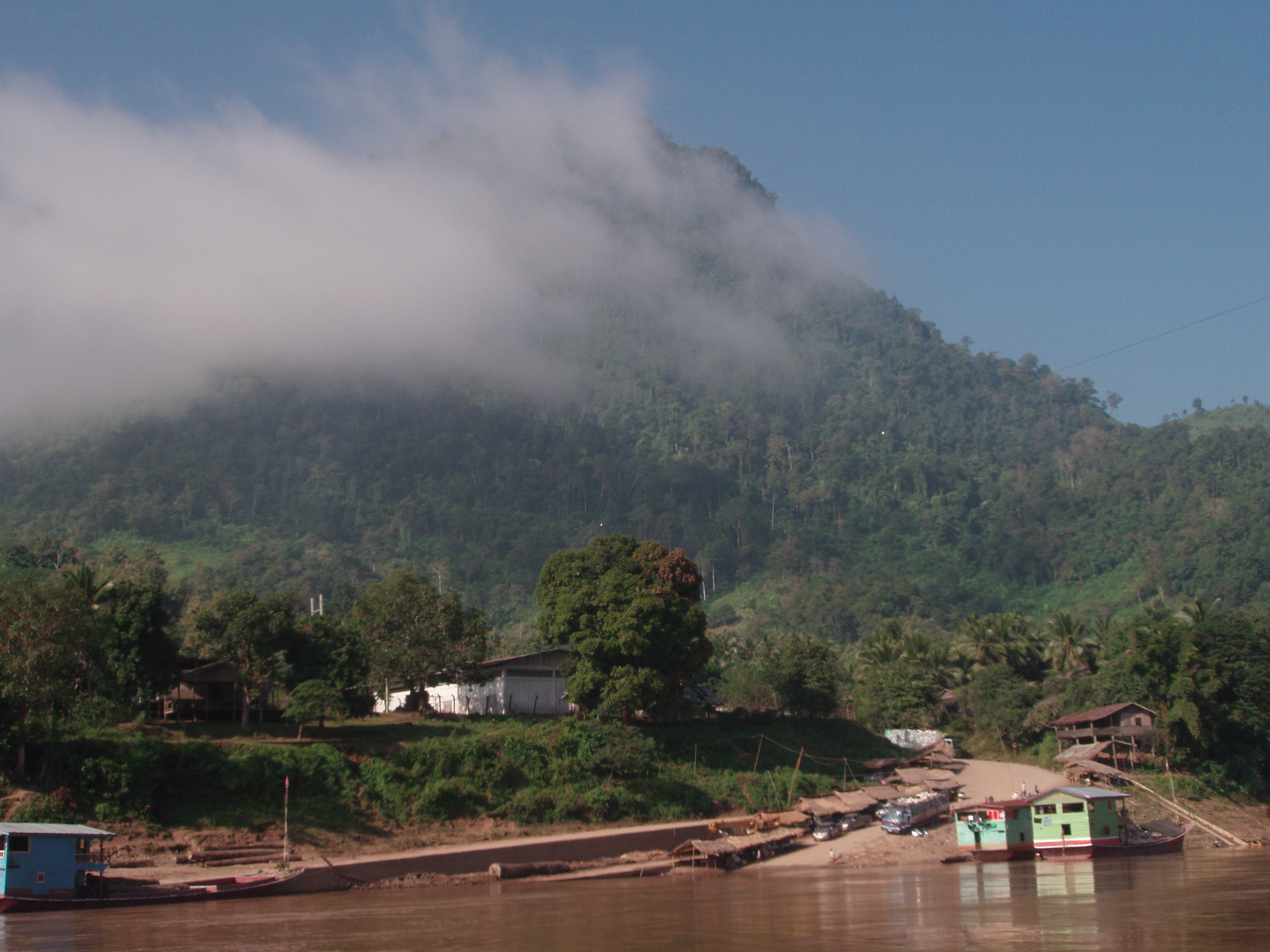
Sainyabuli town

Sainyabuli province is devoid of vehicle roads except for one north–south route extending from the provincial capital to the Thai border opposite Thailand's Loei province. The province has timber and lignite, and is considered the rice basket of northern Laos, since most other northern provinces are too mountainous to grow enough rice. Other crops include maize, oranges, cotton, peanuts, sesame, sugarcane and vegetables such as cucumbers, cabbage, and beans.

== Landmarks ==
Sainyabuli province has monasteries. Wat Simungkhun in Hongsa features an initiation pavilion and a raised stone platform over a hole "'leading to the end of the world". A lopsided gilded stupa, reclining Buddha, garden, and brick ruins of a c. 14th century sim are near Wat Sibounheuang.

Other province landmarks include: The Tam Hine Cave, Wat Natonoy Temple, Ban Yao Village and Tad Chao Waterfall in Xayabury District; Tad Namyal Waterfall, Tham Phaway Cave, Phangoy, Phakeo and Pha Heua Caves in Phiang District; Tad Namphong Waterfall, Wat Siphoun Temple and Tham Seng Yeun Cave in Kenethao District; Tad Ham, Tad Malou and Tad Fanh Waterfall and Ban Leu Village in Betene District; Tad Itan Waterfall and Ban Tha Xuang Village in Hongsa District; and Wat Xieng Ngeun Temple, That Mat Stupa and Khone, a weaving village Ngeun District. Some of the features of these landmarks are the Tai Lue villages where traditional houses are built with high-sloping roofs, the Tai Lue style temples of Vat Ban Khon which depict natural fiber murals and decorations, Vat Si Phan Don known for its diamond-shaped stupa, and French colonial buildings, traditional Lao-style wooden houses can be seen in the Pak Lay town on the banks of the Mekong River, which lies between Vientiane and Sainyabuli.
