= Lao Development Bank =

Commercial bank in the Lao People's Democratic Republic

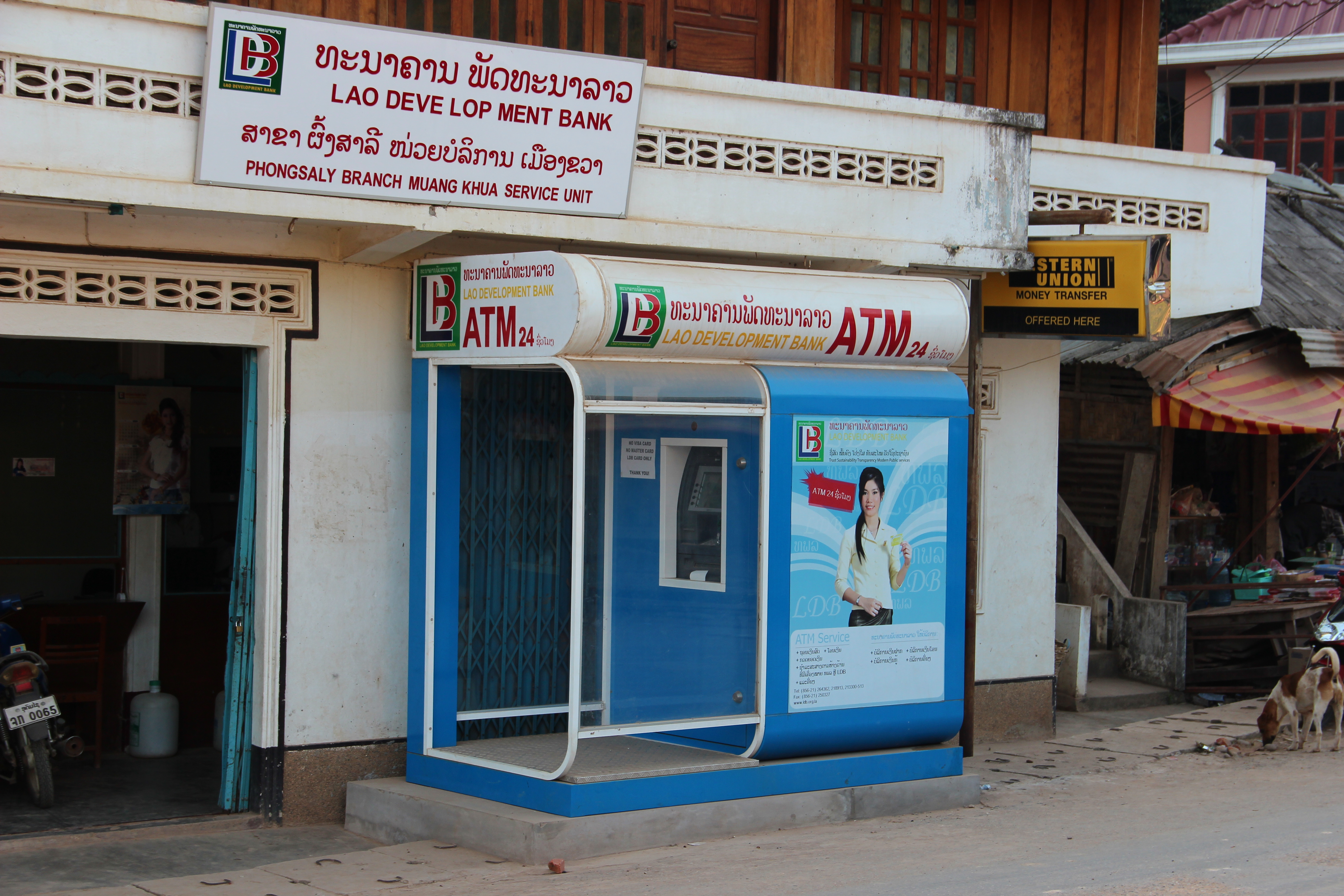
- An LDB ATM in Phôngsali, Laos
- Type: Private
- Industry: Financial services
- Founded: 2003 in Laos
- Owner: 30 % - Lao Ministry of Finance. 70% - Chaleun Sekong Energy Co., Ltd.
- Website: https://www.ldblao.la/

Lao Development Bank (LDB) is a commercial banking group in the Lao People's Democratic Republic. Originally established as a state-owned commercial bank, LDB underwent a restructuring process in 2021 when it was privatized as a joint venture between the Government of Laos and the Chaleun Sekong Group.

== Establishment ==
The Lao Development Bank (LDB) was founded in 2003 as part of a government-led restructuring of the state-dominated banking sector. Initiated by the Bank of the Lao PDR following a 1999 policy directive, the consolidation program was designed to address severe structural vulnerabilities, high operating costs, and overlapping networks among localized state-owned banks.

== Ownership ==
Since September 2021, LDB has operated under a joint-venture structure where Chaleun Sekong Energy Co., Ltd (CSE), a primary subsidiary of the Chaleun Sekong Group (CSG), holds a 70% controlling interest. The remaining 30% is held by the Ministry of Finance on behalf of the Lao government. Chanthanome Phommany, the owner and founder of CSG, serves as the chairman of the executive committee, overseeing the bank's integration with the broader CSG ecosystem.

== Operations in the Golden Triangle SEZ (GTSEZ) ==
LDB maintains an active presence within the Golden Triangle Special Economic Zone (GTSEZ) in Bokeo Province. As a financial service provider in the zone, LDB's operations often involve Chinese and regional commercial entities.

== Regulatory Compliance and Sanctions Risk ==
LDB operates within a complex international regulatory environment. Following the inclusion of the Lao PDR on the FATF Grey List in 2025, the bank has faced increased scrutiny regarding international transactions and correspondent banking relations.

Due to its operations within the Golden Triangle Special Economic Zone, LDB is exposed to sanctions, specifically in connection to its sanctioned business partner and the operator of the zone, the Kings Roman Group and its sanctioned owner Zhao Wei.
