= Golden Triangle Special Economic Zone =

Golden Triangle ເຂດເສດຖະກິດພິເສດສາມຫຼ່ຽມຄຳ 金三角经济特区
- Special Economic Zone
- Golden Triangle Special Economic Zone
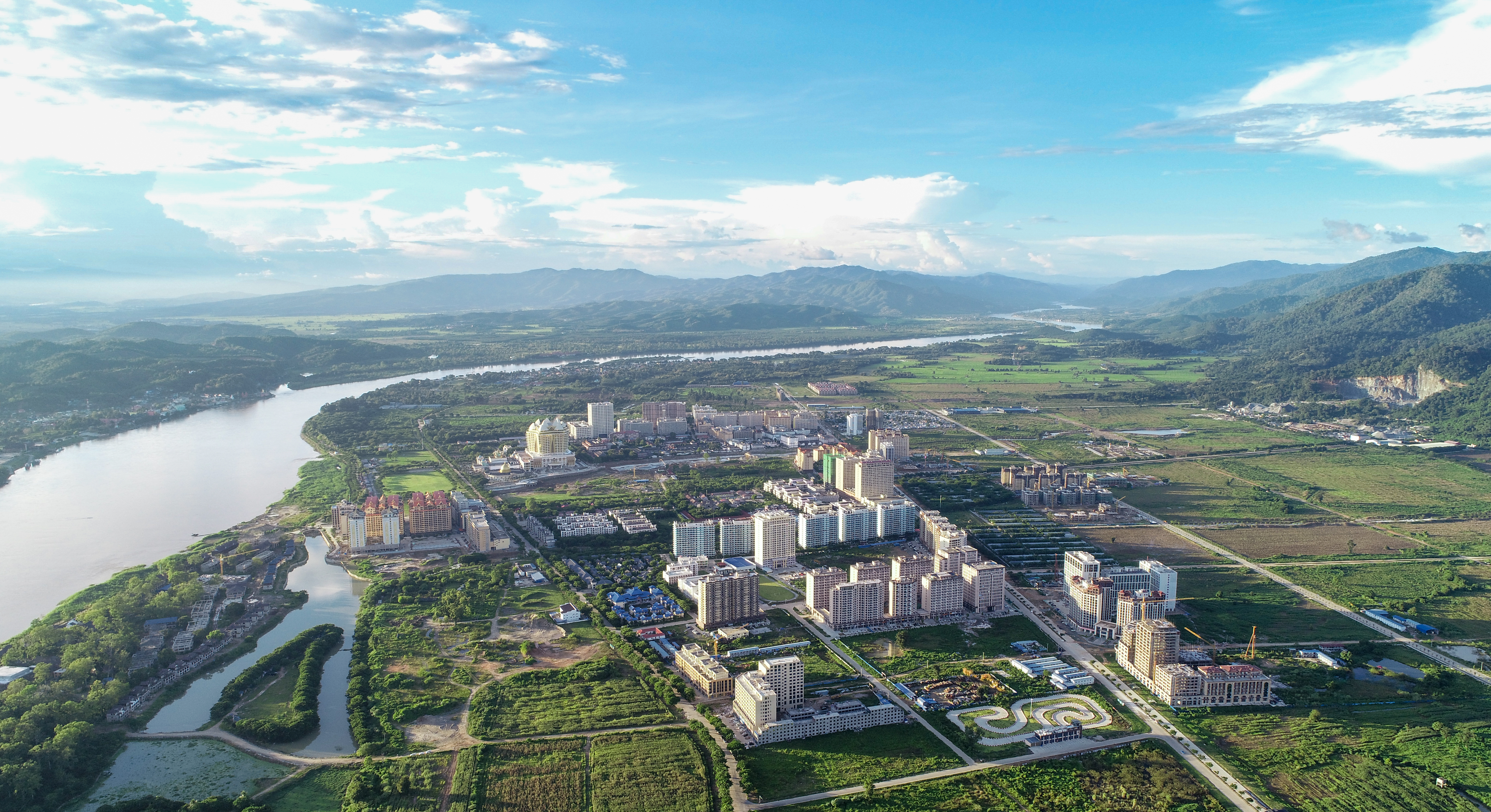
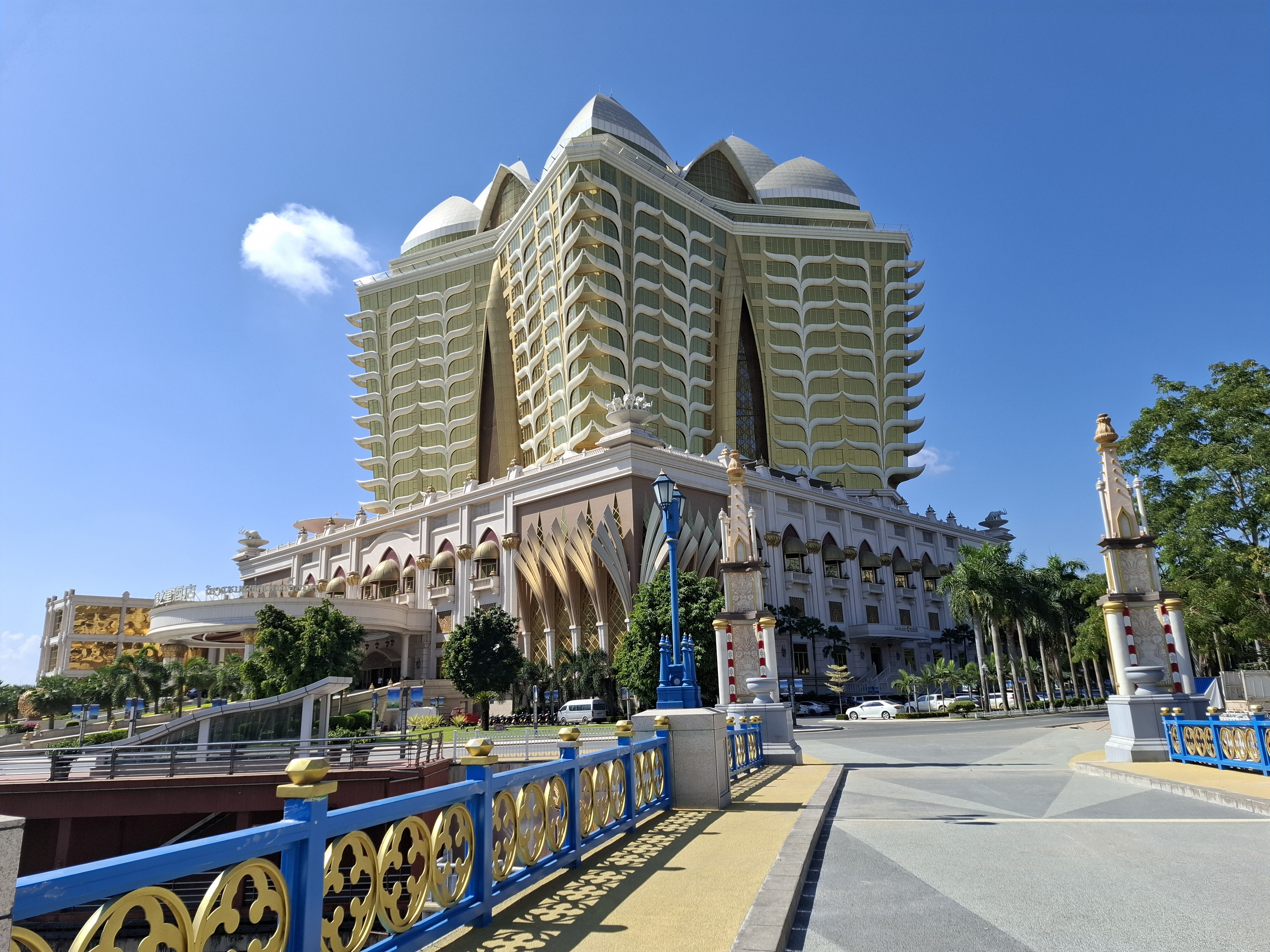
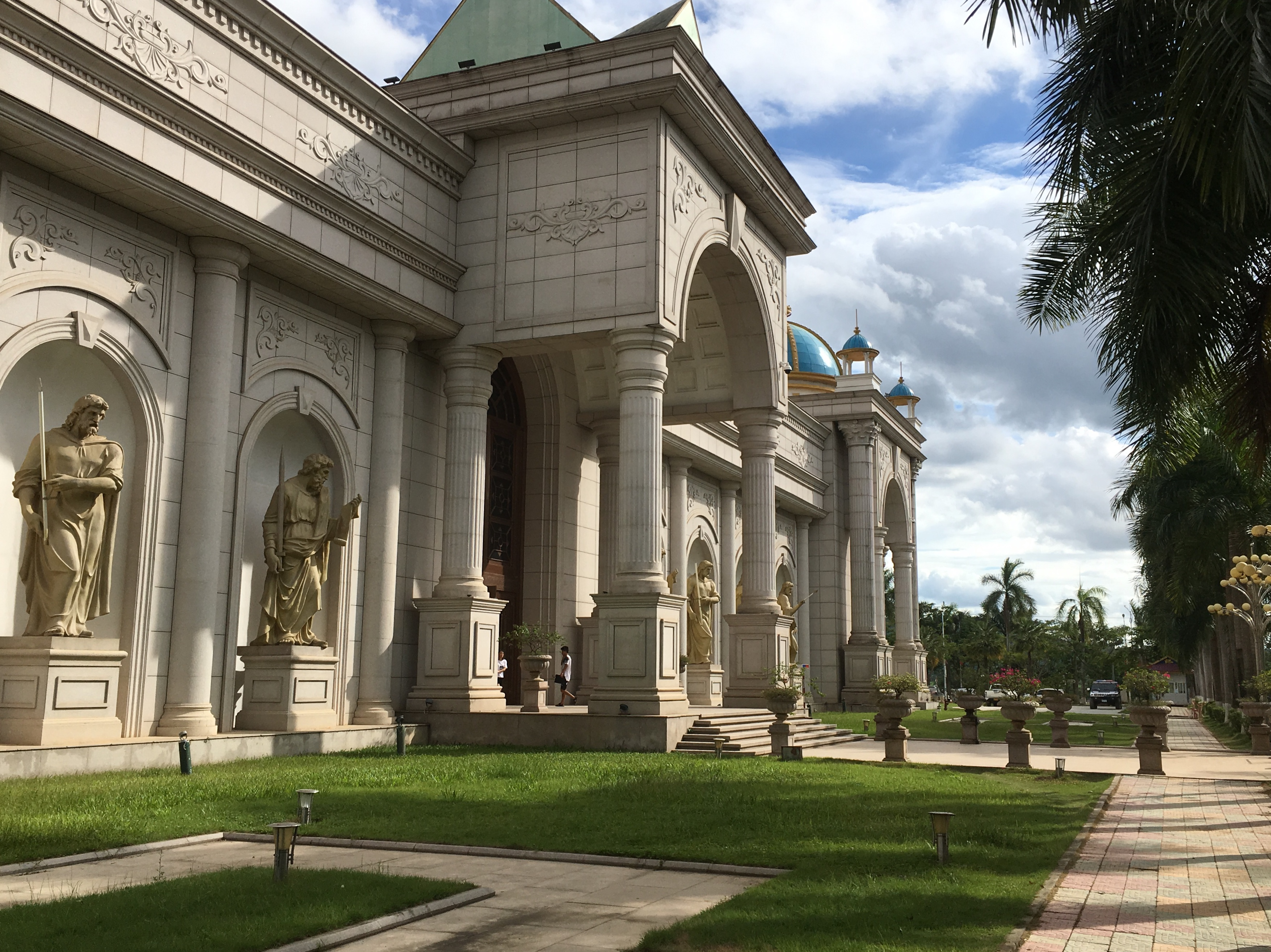
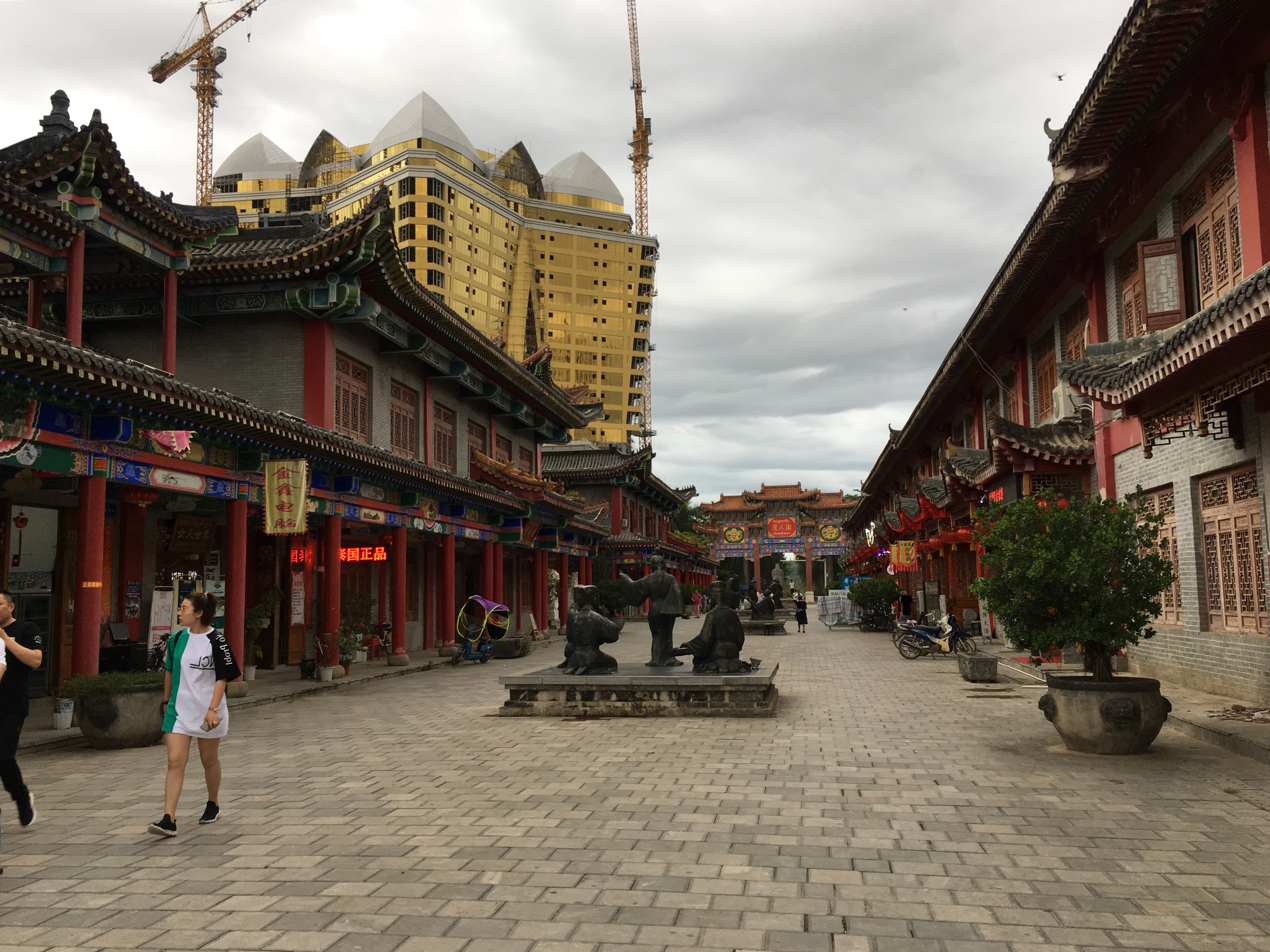
- Skyline view Kapok Star Hotel Kings Romans Casino Chinatown pedestrian mall Bokeo International Airport
- Interactive map of Golden Triangle
- Location within Laos Location within Southeast Asia
- Coordinates: 20°20′24″N 100°6′18″E
- Country: Laos
- Province: Bokeo province
- Created: 2007

Government
  - Type: Special Economic Zone formed by the Lao government in collaboration with the Hong Kong-registered company Kings Romans Group
- Time zone: UTC+7 / UTC+8
- Official languages: Lao; Chinese
- Official scripts: Lao script; Simplified Chinese

The Golden Triangle Special Economic Zone (Lao: ເຂດເສດຖະກິດພິເສດສາມຫຼ່ຽມຄຳ, Chinese: 金三角经济特区; pinyin: Jīnsānjiǎo Jīngjìtèqū, abbreviated GTSEZ) is located along the Mekong River in the Ton Pheung District of Bokeo Province in Laos. The zone has an area of about 3,000 hectares; it was created in 2007 by the Lao government together with the Hong Kong-registered company Kings Romans Group, with the stated goal of generating regional economic development.

At the centre of the zone is the Kings Romans Casino and several hotels, which attract mostly Chinese visitors. The local infrastructure is de facto Chinese, Mandarin is widely spoken and the Chinese yuan is the preferred currency. It is part of a wider trend of casinos emerging in the Mekong region, following the displacement of money laundering activities from Macau in 2014.

Since its inception, it has gained a reputation of being a Chinese colony rife with illegal activities such as drug, human and animal trafficking. In January 2018, the United States Treasury Department sanctioned Kings Romans, its owner, Zhao Wei, and the "Zhao Wei Transnational Crime Organization," alleging the casino was used to launder money and traffic drugs, among other serious crimes. Kings Romans' owner has denied the allegations, while Lao authorities have carried out some enforcement actions following the reports. Despite this, consignments of drugs and precursors still regularly transit near the Golden Triangle SEZ with near-impunity.

== Location ==
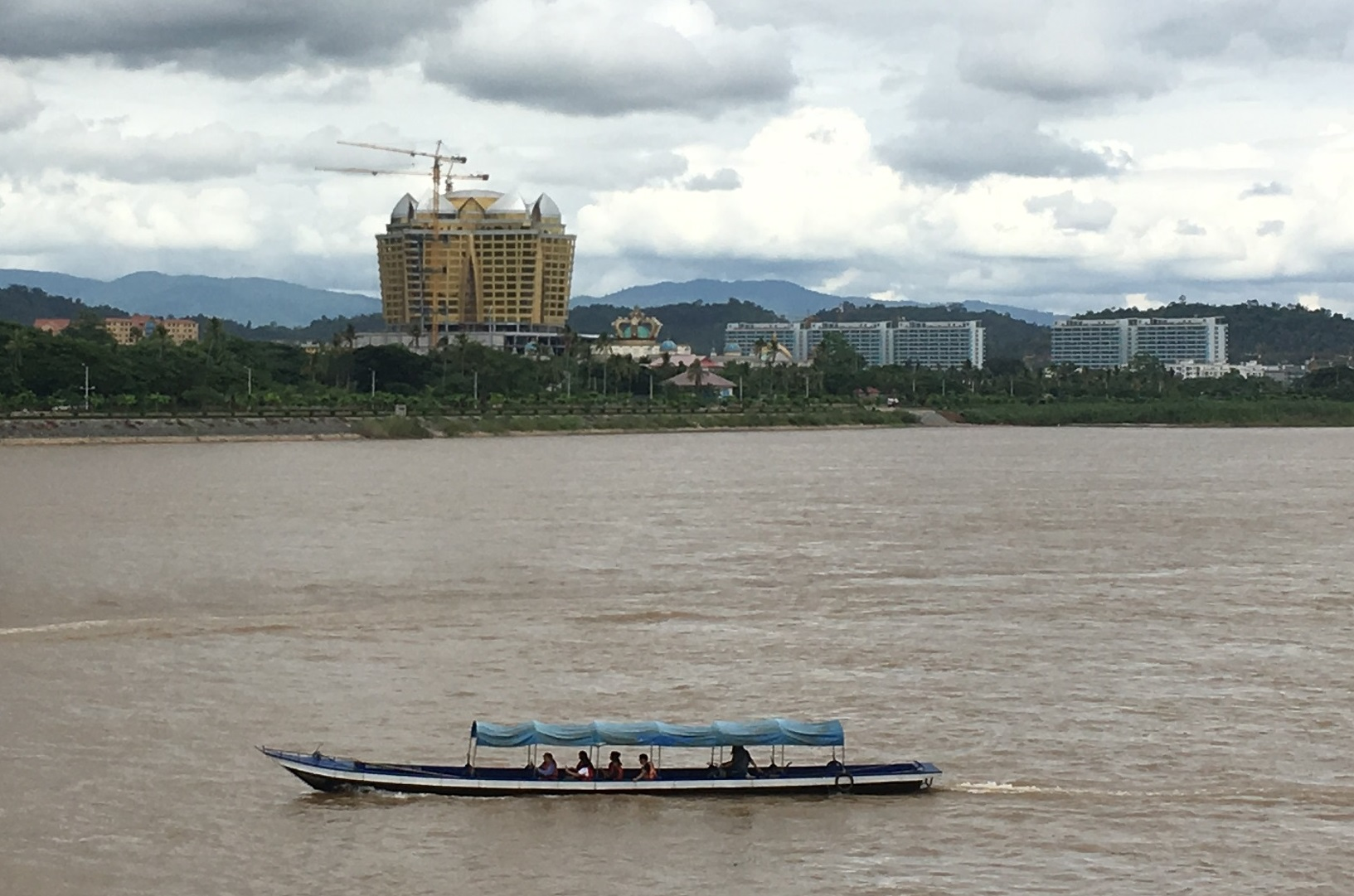
The Golden Triangle SEZ, viewed from the Thai side of the Mekong River

The Golden Triangle Special Economic Zone is located along the Mekong River in the Golden Triangle area where Laos, Myanmar and Thailand meet. The zone is midway (20.361150, 100.099807) between Houay Xay, the capital of Laos' Bokeo Province, and Tachileik, Myanmar. The Thai village of Ban Sop Ruak near Chiang Saen town, Chiang Rai Province lies directly across the Mekong River from the zone.

Besides the casino, the zone has hotels, shops, restaurants, hospital and apartment blocks. There are also several markets in the zone, including the well-known Don Sao Market, which is part of the itinerary of most Mekong River boat tours from Thailand.

== History ==
The area on which the Golden Triangle Special Economic Zone is now located was previously mostly rural agricultural land. The village of Ban Kwan was located in the area; its inhabitants were relocated to make way for the development of the zone.

In 2007, Kings Romans Group entered into a 99-year lease for 10,000 hectares on the banks of the Mekong. The company was granted 3,000 of these hectares as a duty-free zone, which now comprises the SEZ.

== Transportation ==
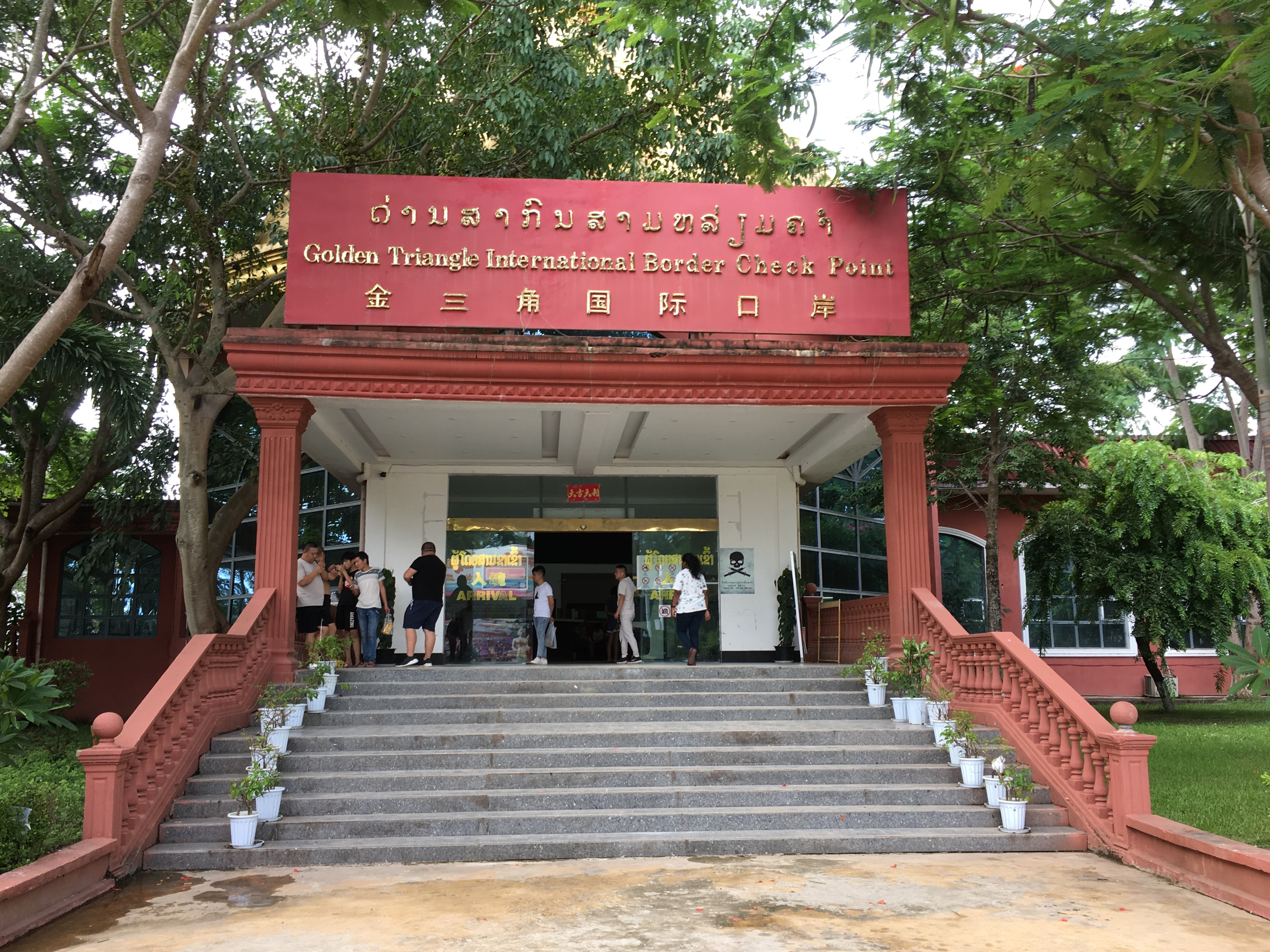
The Sam Liam Kham immigration checkpoint located in the zone, catering to boat passengers from Sop Ruak

The Golden Triangle Special Economic Zone is linked by road to Houay Xay, which lies about 55 km to the east. The road is part of Lao Route 3, which continues from Houay Xay to Luang Namtha and thereafter via Route 13 to the China-Laos border crossing at Boten, a further total distance of 230 km. Houay Xay is also connected to the Thai road network via the Fourth Thai-Lao Friendship Bridge between Houay Xai and Chiang Khong. Roads also run north of the zone and connects with other villages along the Mekong River in Bokeo Province.

The zone can also be easily accessed from Thailand by boat from the Thailand-Laos border crossing pier at Ban Sop Ruak, Chiang Saen. Frequent passenger ferry boats operated by the Kings Romans Group run across the Mekong River between the Ban Sop Ruak checkpoint and the Sam Liam Kham checkpoint in the zone. The boats operate between 6am and 8pm Thailand Standard Time and cost 100 Thai baht per trip, with the journey taking 10 minutes.

In 2024, the Bokeo Provincial Government and Golden Triangle Special Economic Zone management, represented by Zhao Wei, officially opened the newly-built Bokeo International Airport after three years of construction. Chiang Rai Airport in Chiang Rai, Thailand, which lies 60 km from Sop Ruak across the border in Thailand, is another key transport hub for people traveling to and from the zone. The airport has direct flight connections with Chinese cities.

== Economy ==
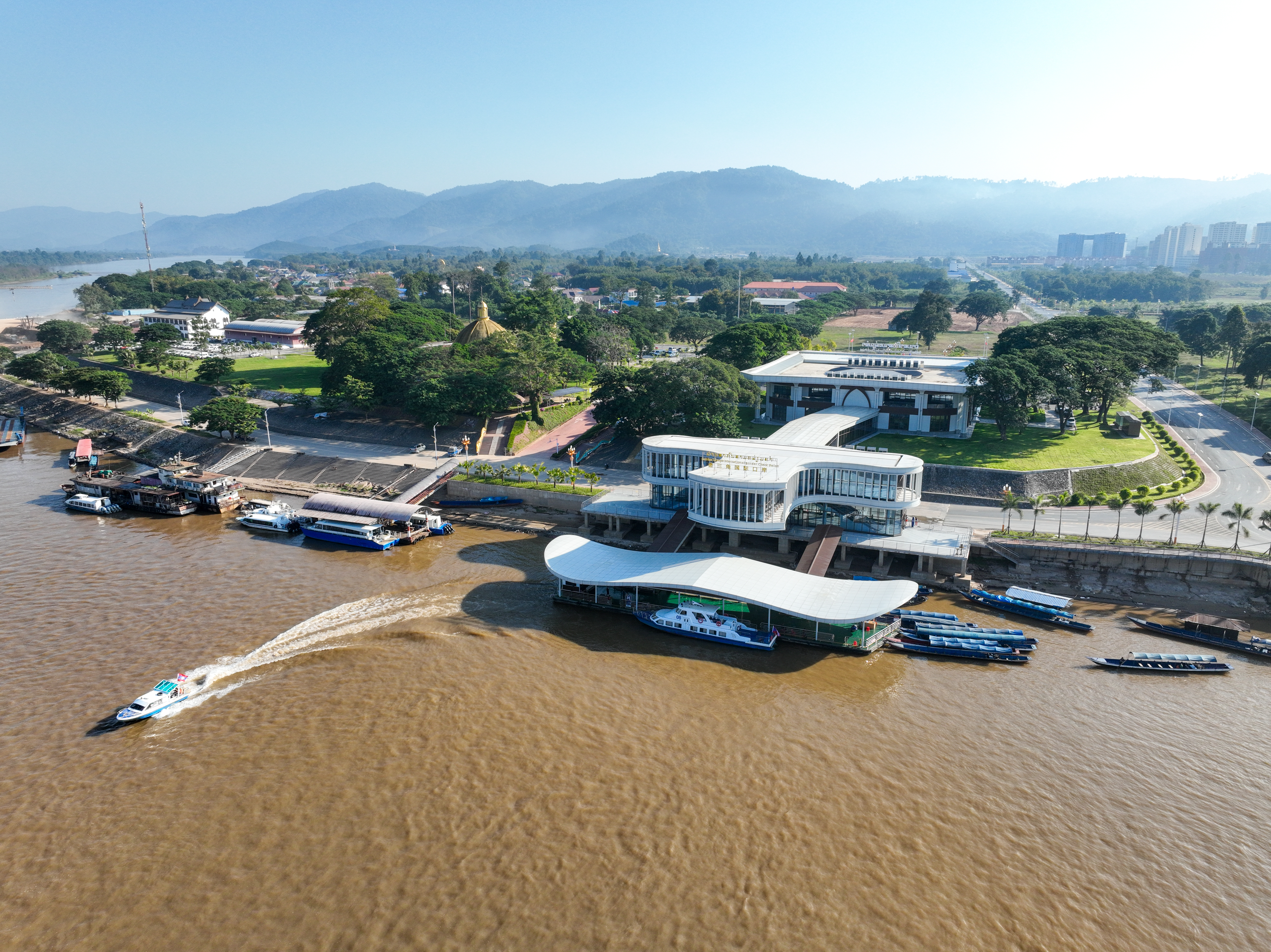
Golden Triangle International Border Checkpoint

The zone was created with the intention of boosting economic growth in this remote corner of Laos. In this, it has partially succeeded: since the SEZ was launched, Bokeo has gone from being one of the country's poorest provinces to one of its best-off, registering the steepest reduction in poverty of any Laotian province since 2013.

The website of the Lao Ministry of Planning and Investment's Investment Promotion Department states that investment projects in the zone include the construction of economic infrastructure; agriculture, livestock, manufacturing; hotel and residential area development; golf courses; education institutions and health treatment centers; business and international trade; real estate; banking, insurance and financial institution; post, telecommunication, internet, advertising and printing; transportation of goods and passengers; development of tourism and entertainment zone; restaurants and bars and warehouses, duty-free shops and a duty-free area. The website states that the total investment in the zone is estimated to be US$86.6 million.

Financial services in the zone are supported by major national institutions, including a prominent branch of Chaleun Sekong Group’s and the Lao government’s Lao Development Bank (LDB), which provides banking and international trade services to investors and residents within the SEZ.

In 2007, the Hong Kong-registered company Kings Romans Group received a 99-year lease to develop the SEZ into a casino destination. As gambling is illegal in China, and the zone is only a few hours' journey by road from the Boten border crossing or by air from mainland China, massive casinos and hotels catering to a Chinese clientele have been built; the most prominent being the Kings Romans/Blue Shield casino, one of the very first buildings to be built in the zone. Apartment blocks, houses and infrastructure facilities such as roads and piers have come up to cater to the influx of tourists and residents to the zone.

Banks and financial institutions associated with the GTSEZ
Name	Abbreviation	Additional information
Bank of the Lao P.D.R	BOL	BOL has a Representative Office within the GTSEZ One-Stop Service Office, providing financial regulatory oversight.
Lao Development Bank	LDB	A joint venture between Chaleun Sekong Group and the Lao government, faces increased sanctions risk due to the status on the FATF grey list, alongside recent allegations concerning the bank.
Joint Development Bank	JDB	Lao commercial bank. JDB accounts in Lao kip, Thai baht and Chinese yuan have been listed as payment accounts for activities held at the GTSEZ.

== Organized crime ==
The Golden Triangle Special Economic Zone has been labelled by some as a de facto Chinese colony. Virtually all street signs, shop signage and billboards are labelled in both Mandarin and Laotian. Clocks are set to Beijing time. Commonly accepted currencies include Chinese yuan and Thai baht. Shops in the zone are stocked mostly with Chinese products, and Chinese cuisine is offered in most restaurants and food outlets.

In January 2018, the US Treasury Department announced sanctions against what it called "Zhao Wei's Transnational Criminal Organisation", naming two Hong Kong-registered companies under the Kings Romans Group as its corporate fronts and identifying the group's owners Zhao Wei and his wife Su Guiqin as the organisation's leaders. The department stated that "the Zhao Wei crime network engages in an array of horrendous illicit activities, including human trafficking and child prostitution, drug trafficking and wildlife trafficking."

Following the announcement, Zhao Wei called for a press conference, denying the allegations that illegal activities took place in the zone. Saying that the sanctions against his companies were groundless, he added that the Kings Romans Group's investment and development strictly complied with the law and signed agreements. "There are neither reasons nor motivations for us to run illegal businesses. On the contrary, we have cooperated with the government of Laos to prevent and combat strictly illegal acts," he said.

=== Wildlife trafficking ===
Reports state that a robust industry involving trafficking in endangered animals has grown up around the Chinese tourist trade. Several restaurants in the SEZ serve 'exotic' meats: tiger, pangolin, bear cub, python, axolotl, red-eared slider turtle and Chinese giant salamander. Menus openly include such fare as bear paw, monitor lizards, geckos, snakes and turtles. Tiger bone wine is a frequent accompaniment. Shops in the SEZ sell animal parts, stuffed animals, and ivory, all in contravention of the CITES treaty to which Laos is a party. A local compound, marked as a "zoo" on maps but not open to the public, has been identified as an illegal breeding facility and slaughterhouse for tigers and bears.

The Lao government has taken some steps to curb the illegal trade in wildlife parts, confiscating items and closing shops during enforcement raids.

=== Cyber-enabled crime ===
Several scam centers are located inside the Golden Triangle Special Economic Zone, many of which are operated by Chinese criminal gangs. Human trafficking victims are locked inside guarded high-rises with barred windows and high fences wrapped in razor wire, forced to engage in online fraud against their will. Multiple law enforcement actions have taken place in the zone specifically targeting online scam operations. Hundreds of Chinese nationals have been detained and deported to China suspected of engaging in online crimes in the zone since at least as far back as 2016.

=== Drug trafficking and casino money laundering ===
Seizures of high-grade crystal methamphetamine traced back to the Laos border are up over 200% in 2020 in northeast Thailand, and dozens of large seizures have been made in recent months in Vietnam along its remote and often mountainous 2,100 kilometer (1,300 mile) border with Laos as well. At the same time, there are increasing reports of precursor chemicals from across the region going through Laos, destined for autonomous special regions and known drug-producing areas in neighboring Myanmar.

In early October 2020, a $50 million investment to build a port in the Laotian town of Ban Mom, directly north of the Golden Triangle Special Economic Zone, was made by Osiano Trading Sole Co., a partner or front company of Zhao Wei and his organization. Zhao Wei is recognized as a significant organized crime figure by the United States Government for his involvement in the trafficking of drugs, wildlife and people, and other forms of serious transnational crime, including large-scale money laundering through the Kings Romans Casino and aligned businesses. At the Kings Romans casino, million-dollar cash transactions without documentation have been observed at the cashier desk on the gaming floor. Those involved, likely implicated in large-scale money laundering schemes, carried away stacks of 100-yuan note bundles in large duffle bags.

The United Nations Office on Drugs and Crime (UNODC) has also repeatedly raised concerns about Laotian territory being used by organized crime to traffic drugs, precursor chemicals and other illicit commodities; that unregulated border casinos in the Mekong region including Kings Romans are being used to launder money; and that the purchase of the Ban Mom port is a representation of organized crime infiltrating critical infrastructure in the region. Regional experts raised concerns about the potential utility of the port, and the risk that it could be used to support illicit industries, including the shipping of precursor chemicals – the ingredients to make synthetic drugs – into the Golden Triangle area and export of finished products down the Mekong. Laos is the key route into the Golden Triangle for precursors from China, and finished products from the region have been seized across the region and beyond.

In 2024, the UNODC reported that for the year prior, seizures of methamphetamine reached the highest amount ever recorded for the region. Prior to the announcement of the port’s development, the Ban Mom area had been confirmed as a location used for trafficking drugs and precursor chemicals into and out of drug production areas and special regions. Following news of the project launch, the UNODC’s Regional Representative for Southeast Asia and the Pacific told the media: “To put a piece of infrastructure like this in the hands of this gentleman and his companies is, frankly, unbelievable… We’re really concerned.”

Since the late 2010s, concerns have been raised by the UNODC and others regarding the region’s now-dominant role in the production and trafficking of methamphetamine and synthetic drugs. In 2019, the UNODC estimated that transnational crime groups were trafficking methamphetamine made in Southeast Asia with a market value of between $30.3 billion and $61.4 billion, up from $15 billion in 2013. While regional opium and heroin production is still a major concern, the region has become the primary source of synthetics for other parts of the world, in which the Golden Triangle area is a major hub.

== Gallery ==
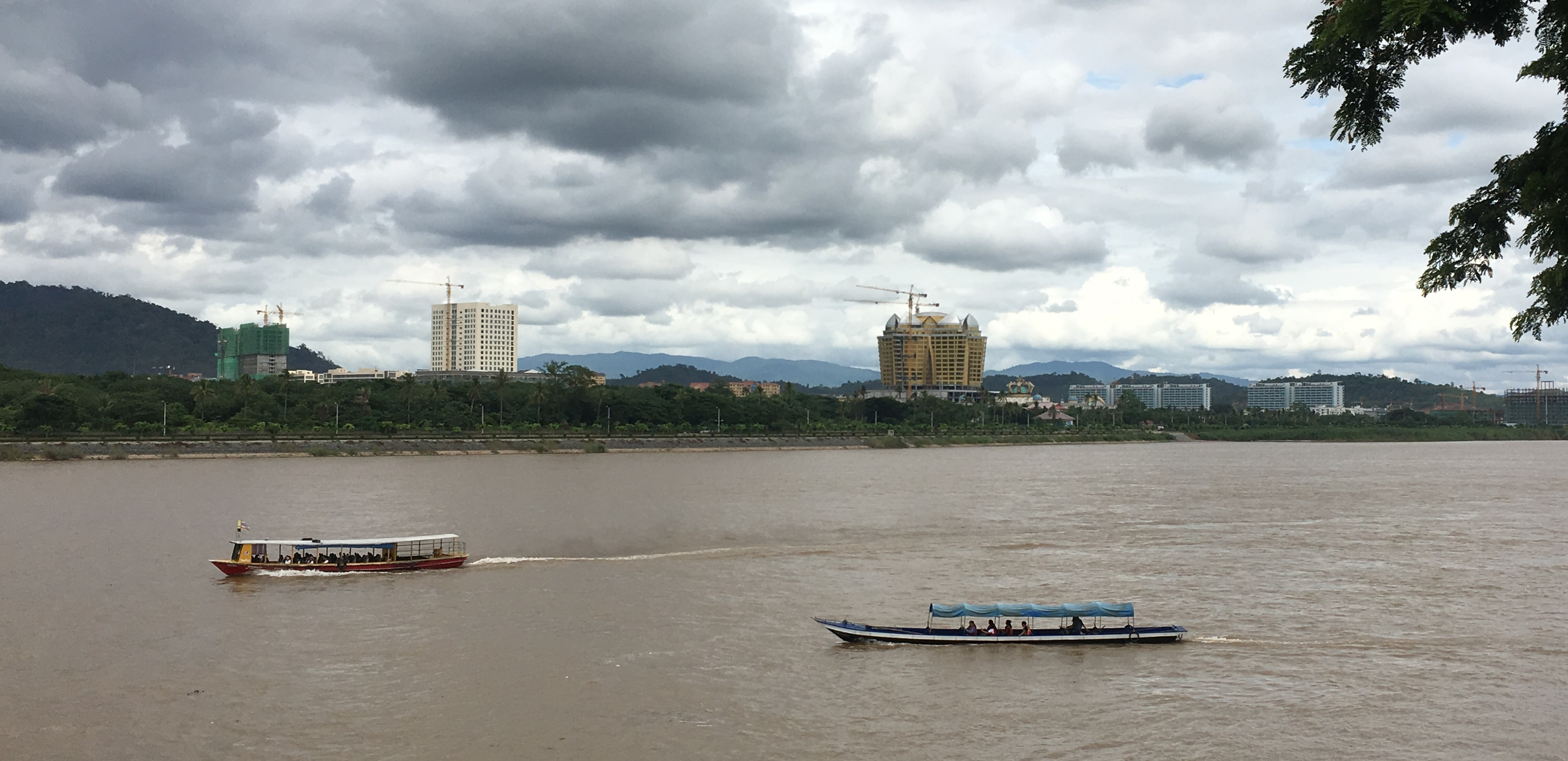
View of the Golden Triangle Special Economic Zone

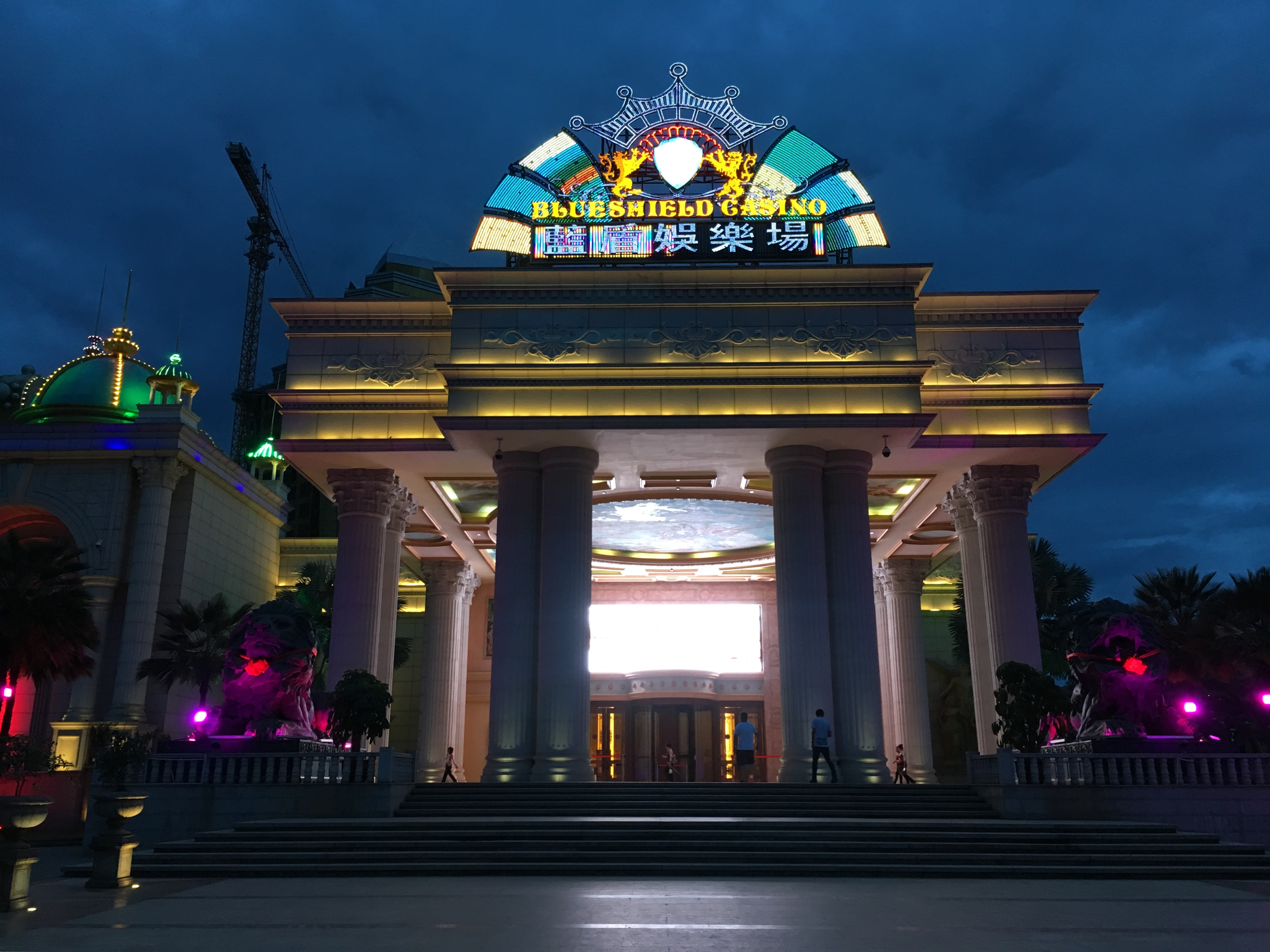
Entrance of the Blue Shield Casino, the main landmark in the Golden Triangle SEZ

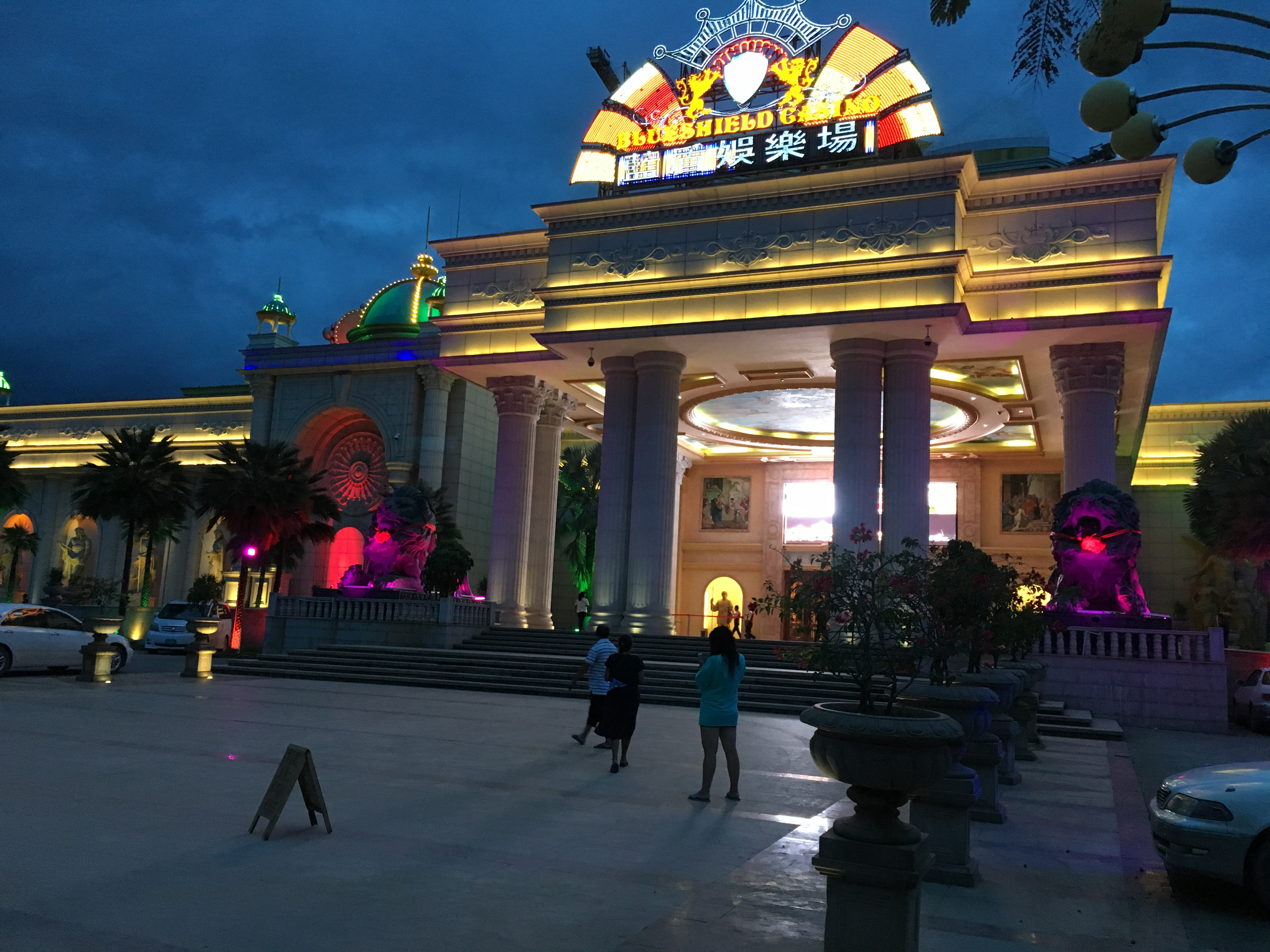
Another view of the front entrance of the Blue Shield Casino

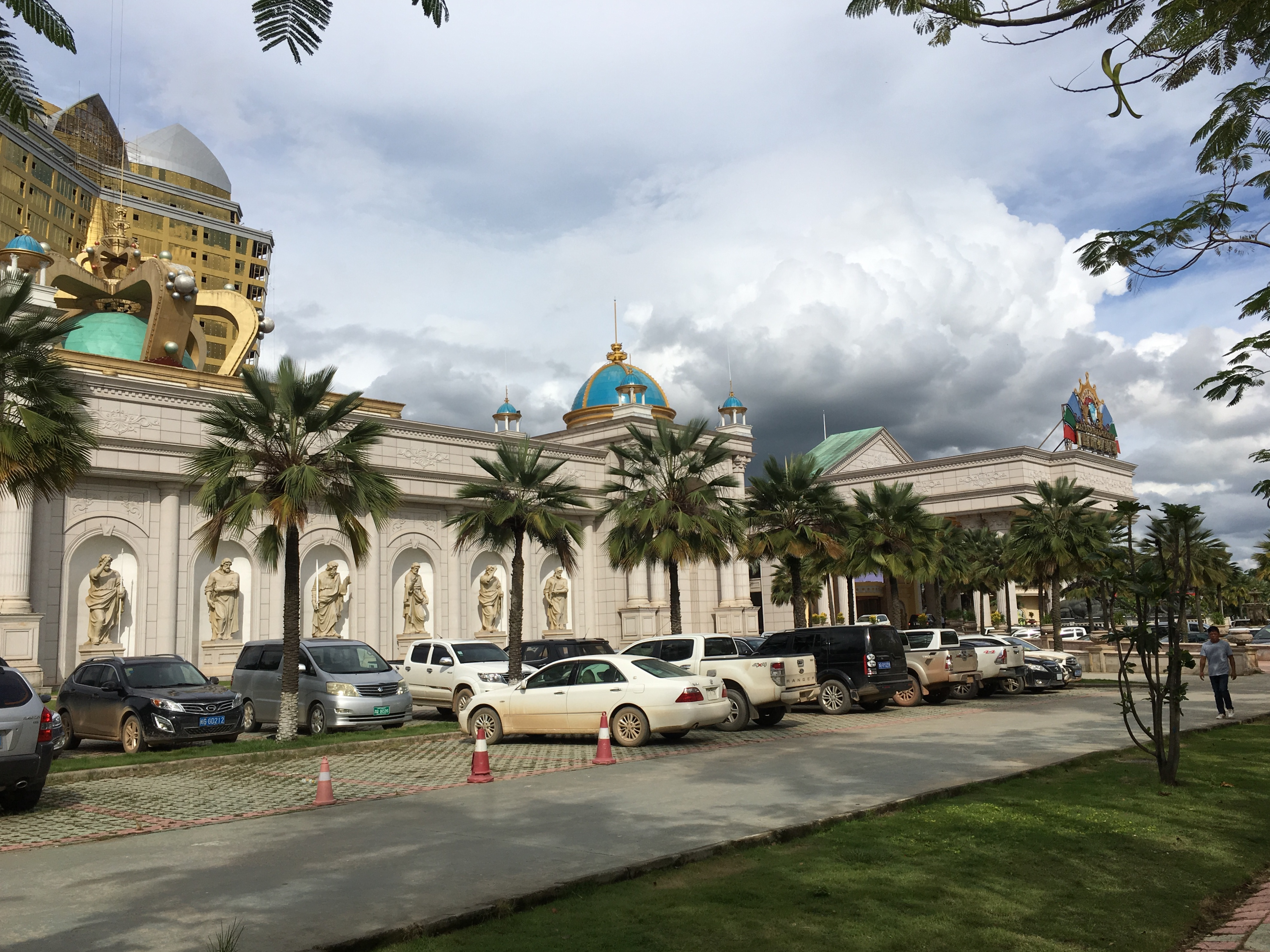
Front exterior of the Blue Shield Casino

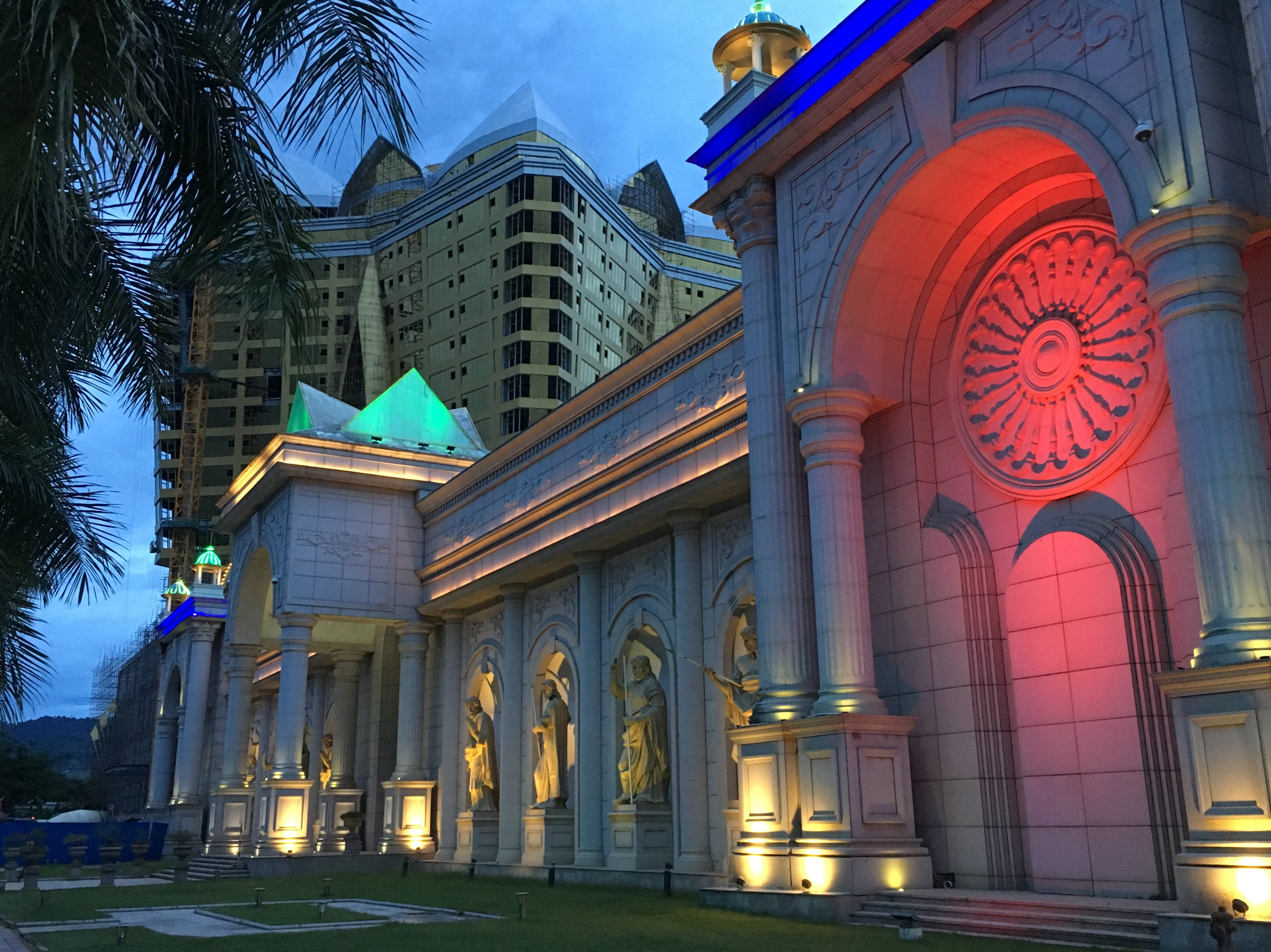
Exterior of the Blue Shield Casino

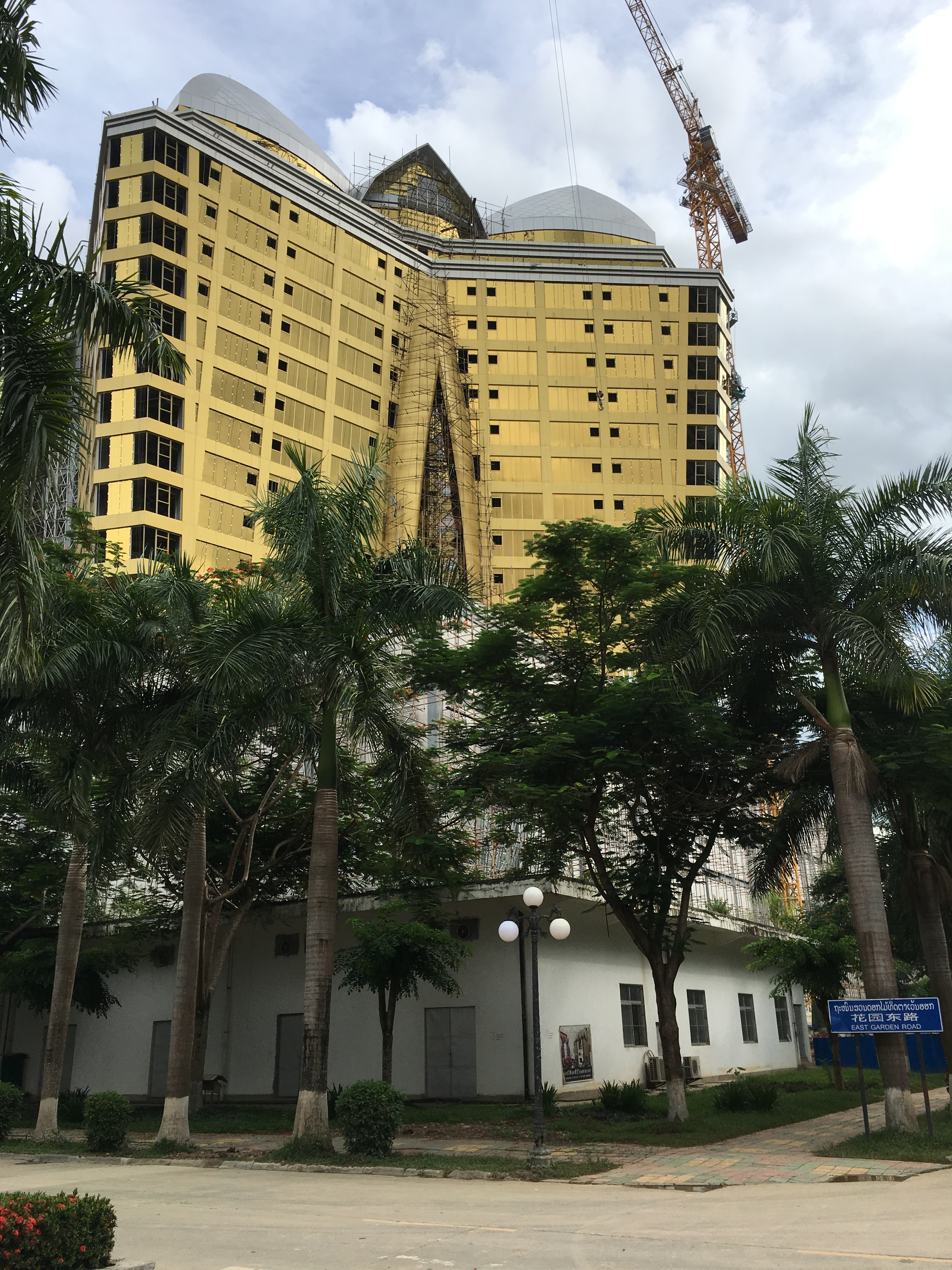
New tower for the Blue Shield Casino nearing completion

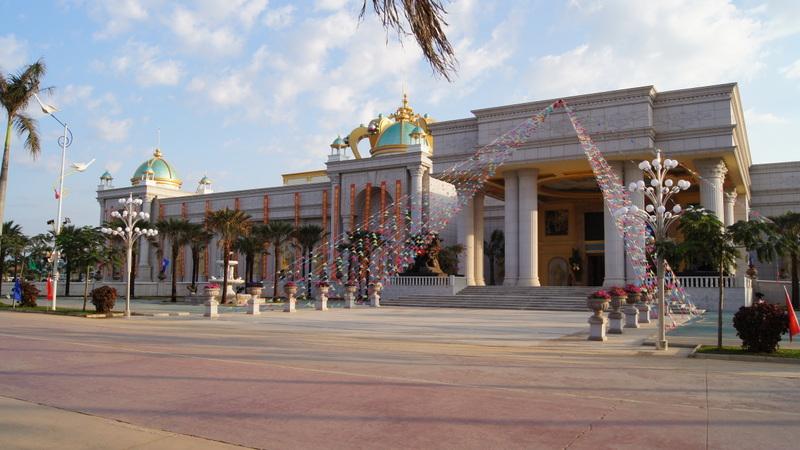
View of the Blue Shield Casino in 2010

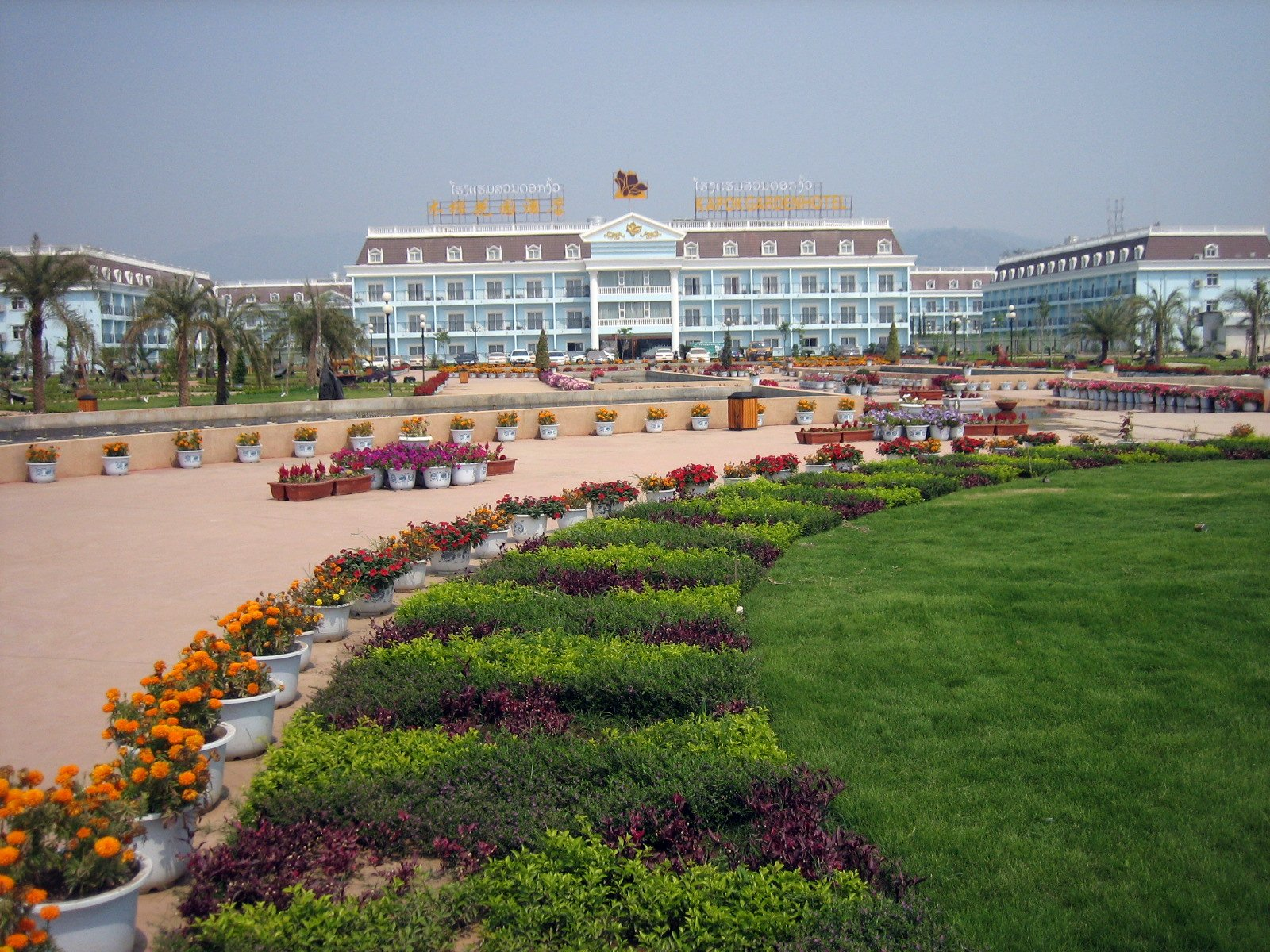
The Kapok Hotel next to the Blue Shield Casino in 2010

Apartment blocks in the Golden Triangle SEZ

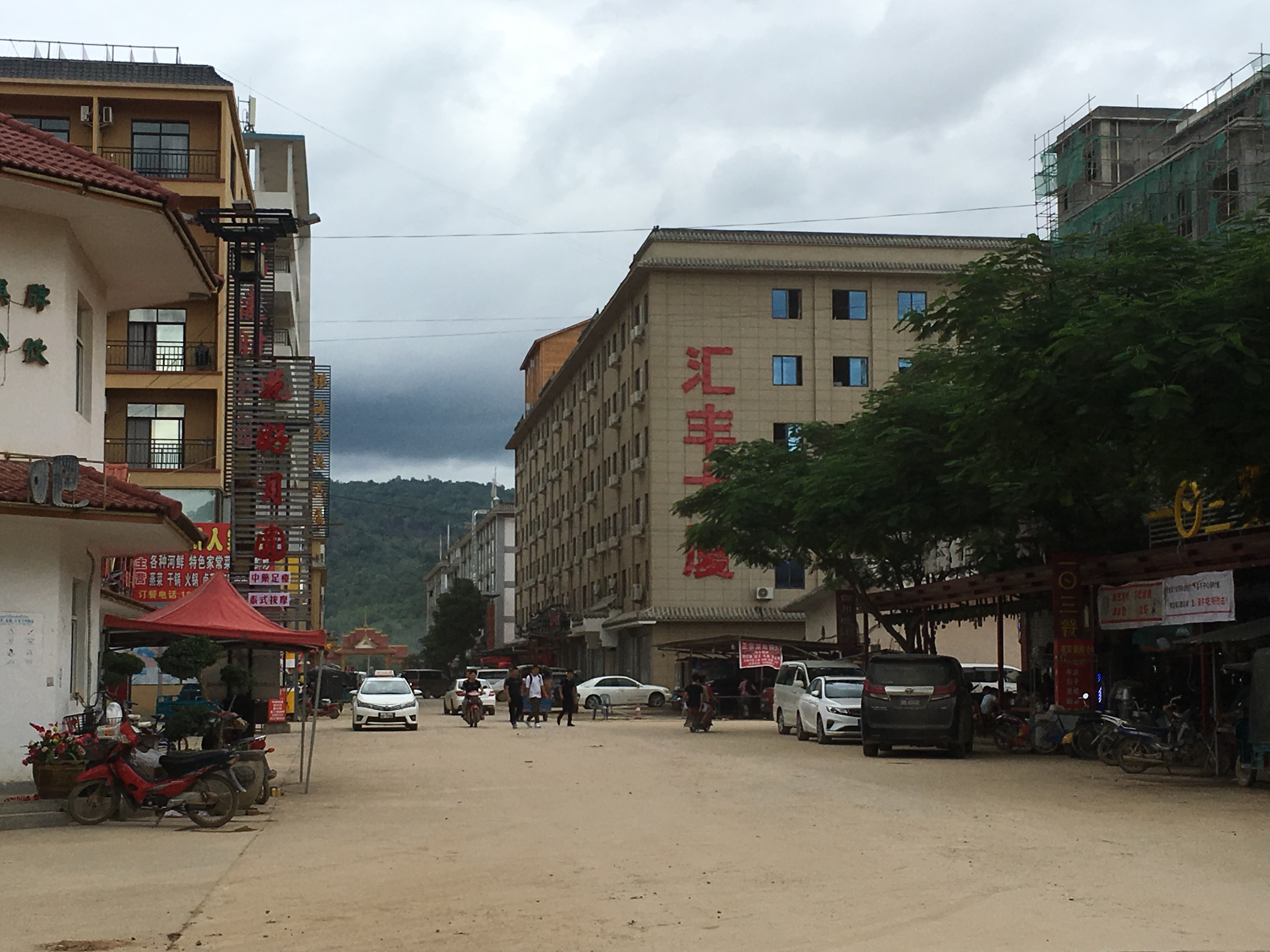
Laos and China Friendship Street in the Golden Triangle SEZ

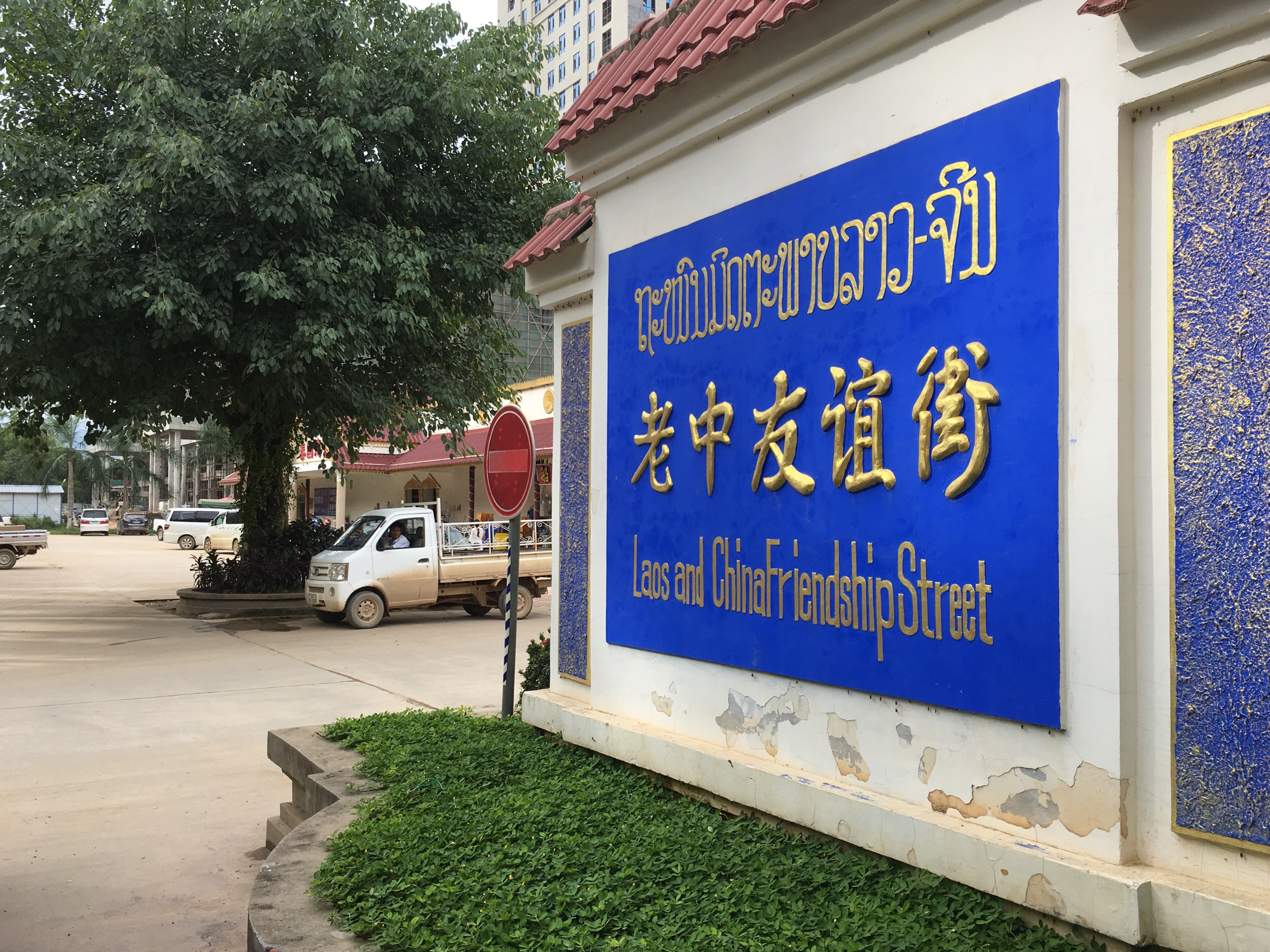
Trilingual sign at the Laos and China Friendship Street

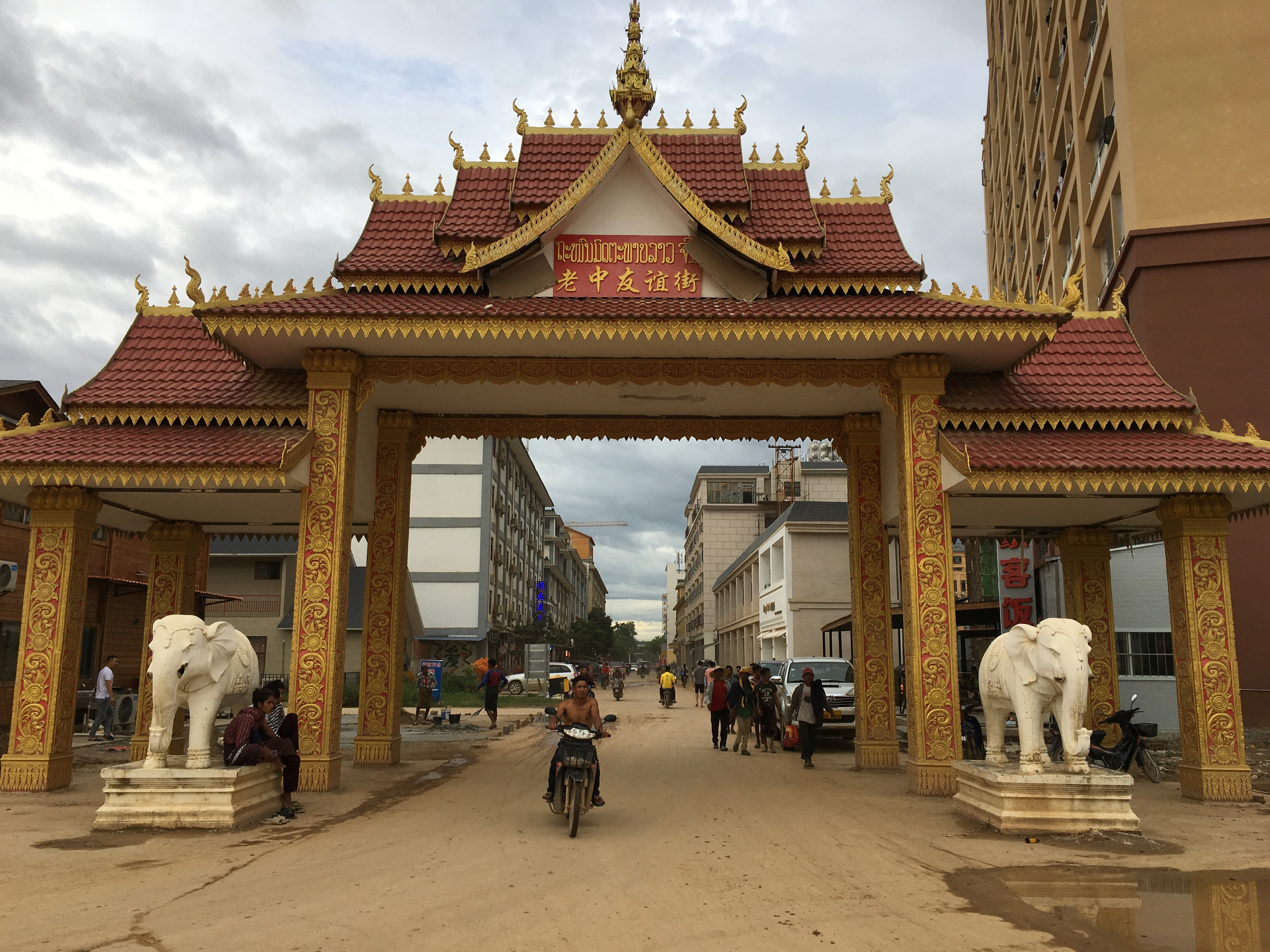
Northern end of the Laos and China Friendship Street

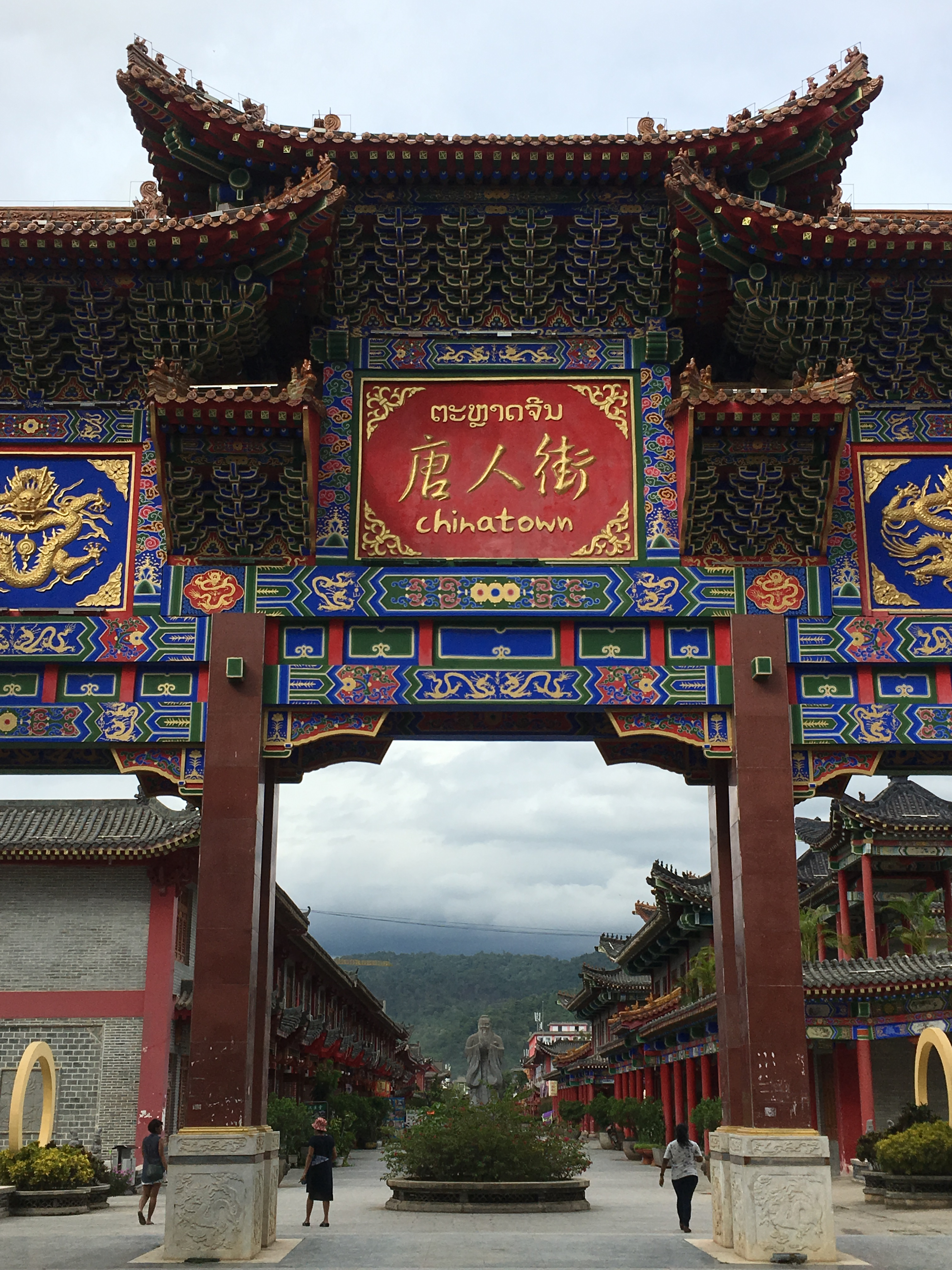
Archway at the entrance to the Chinatown pedestrian mall

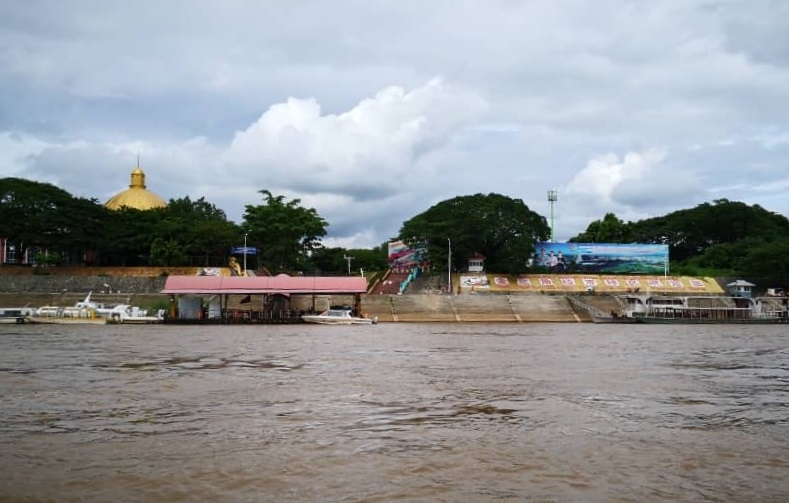
Approaching Sam Liam Kham immigration, customs and quarantine checkpoint via ferry

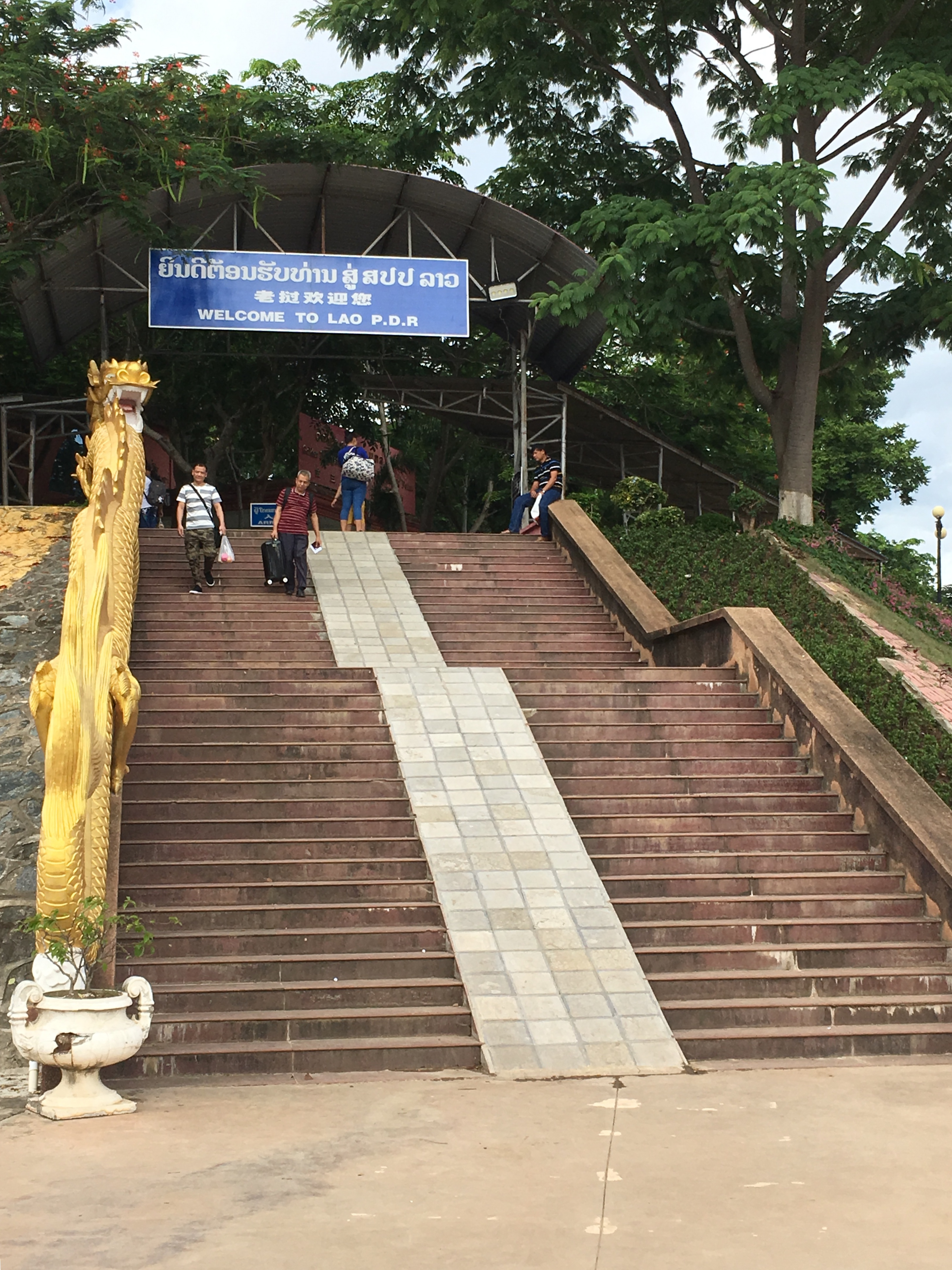
Sam Liam Kham immigration, customs and quarantine checkpoint

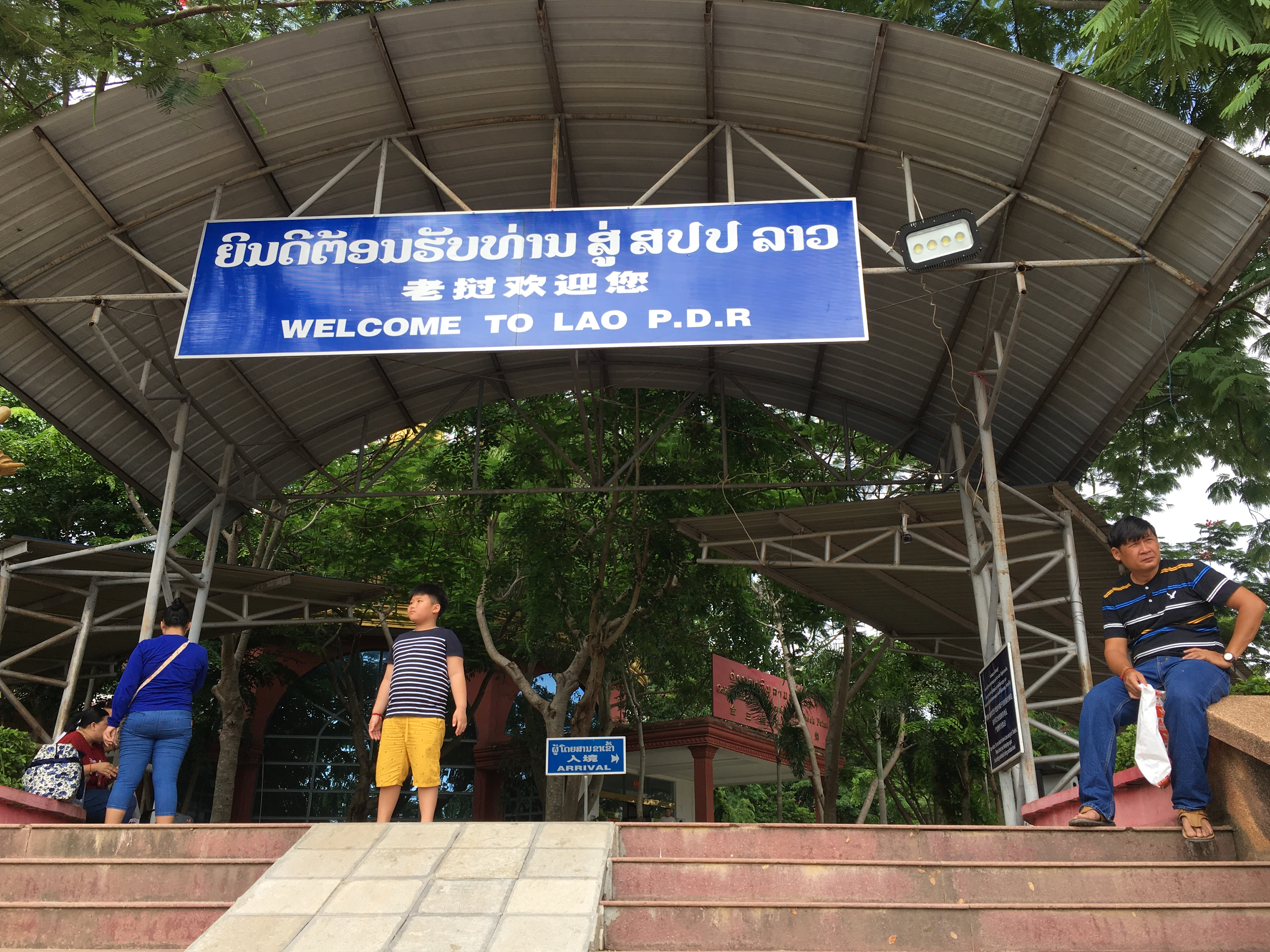
Sam Liam Kham immigration, customs and quarantine checkpoint

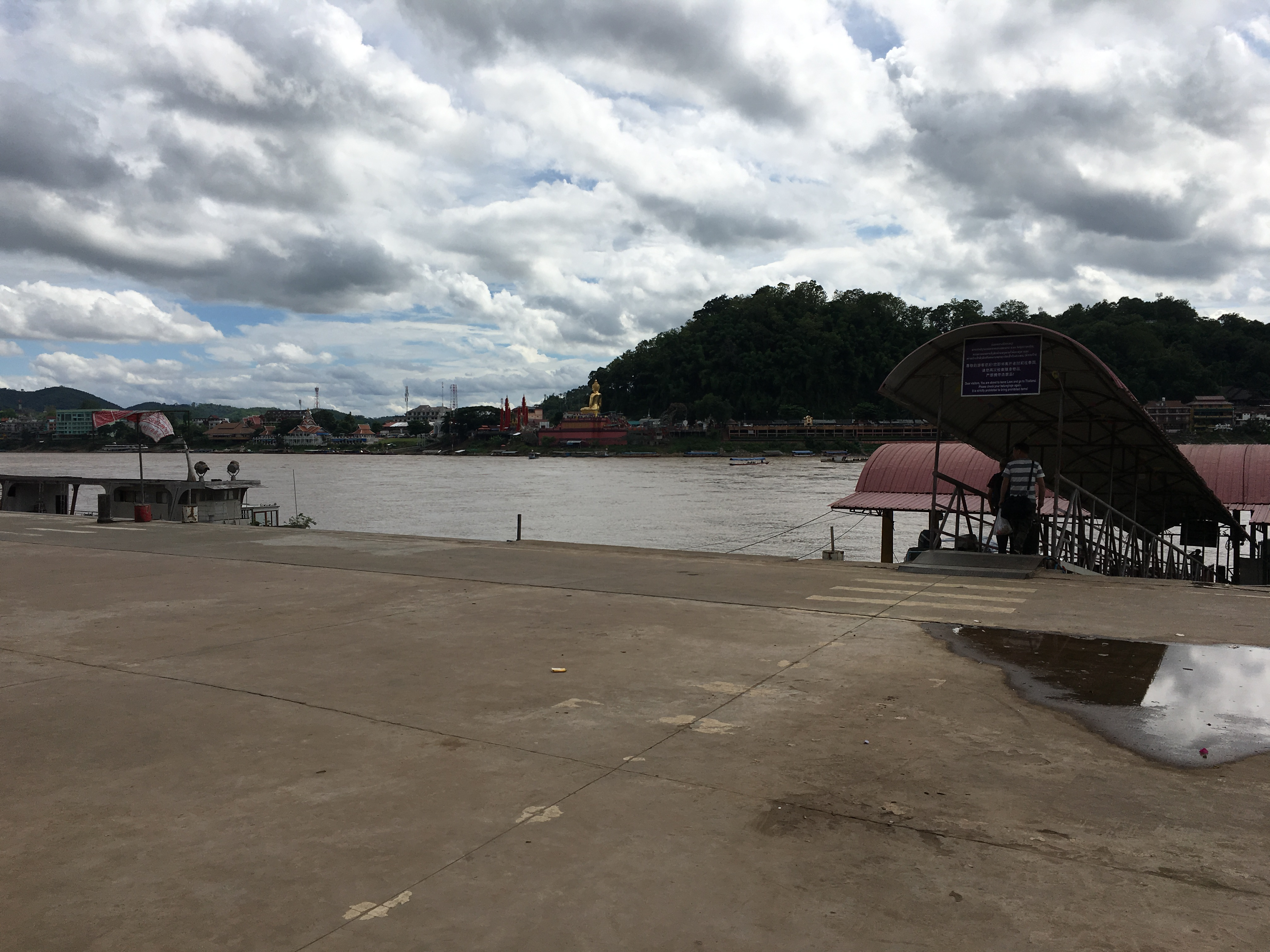
Sam Liam Kham checkpoint pier, with Ban Sop Ruak in Thailand visible across the Mekong River

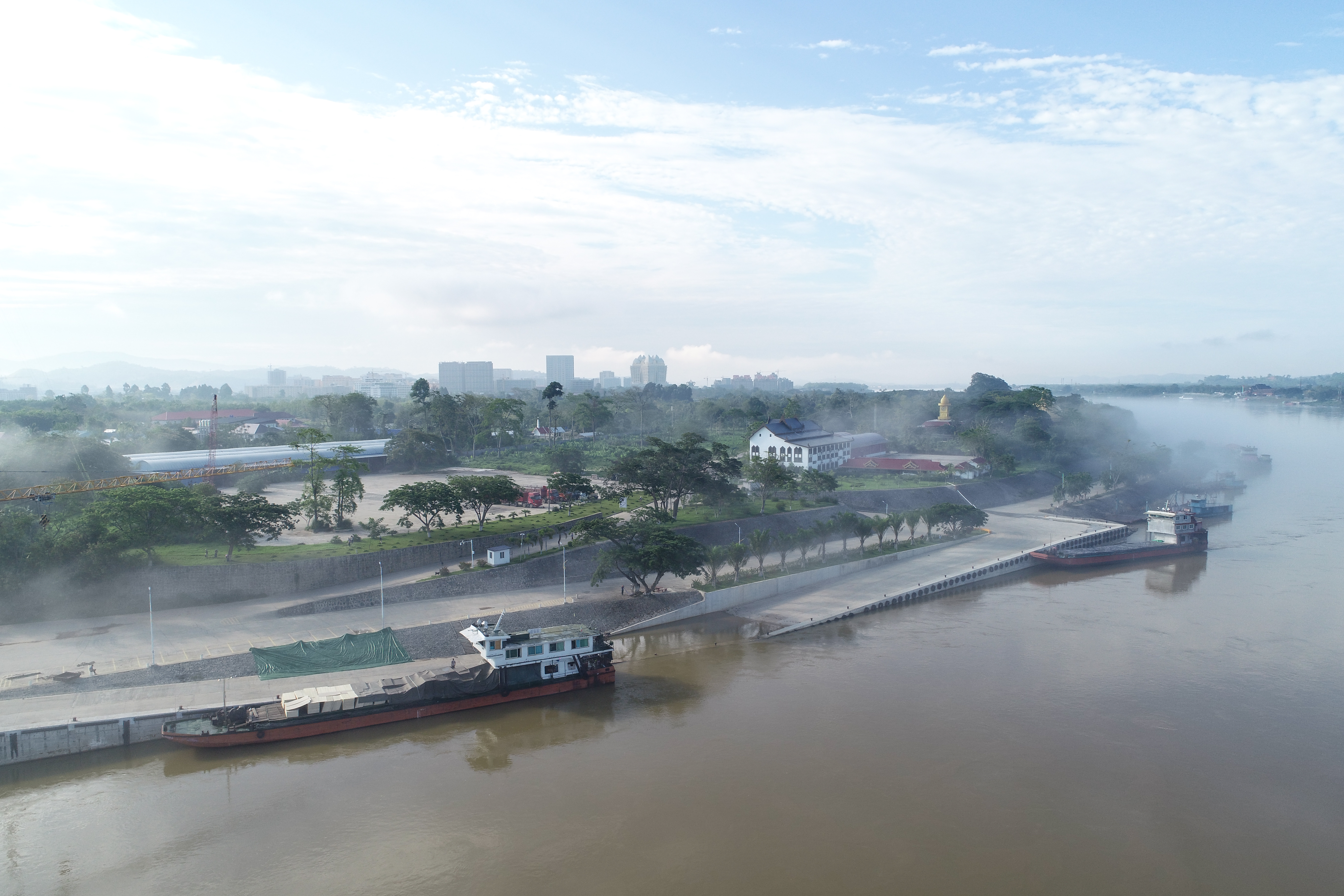
A port in the Golden Triangle SEZ

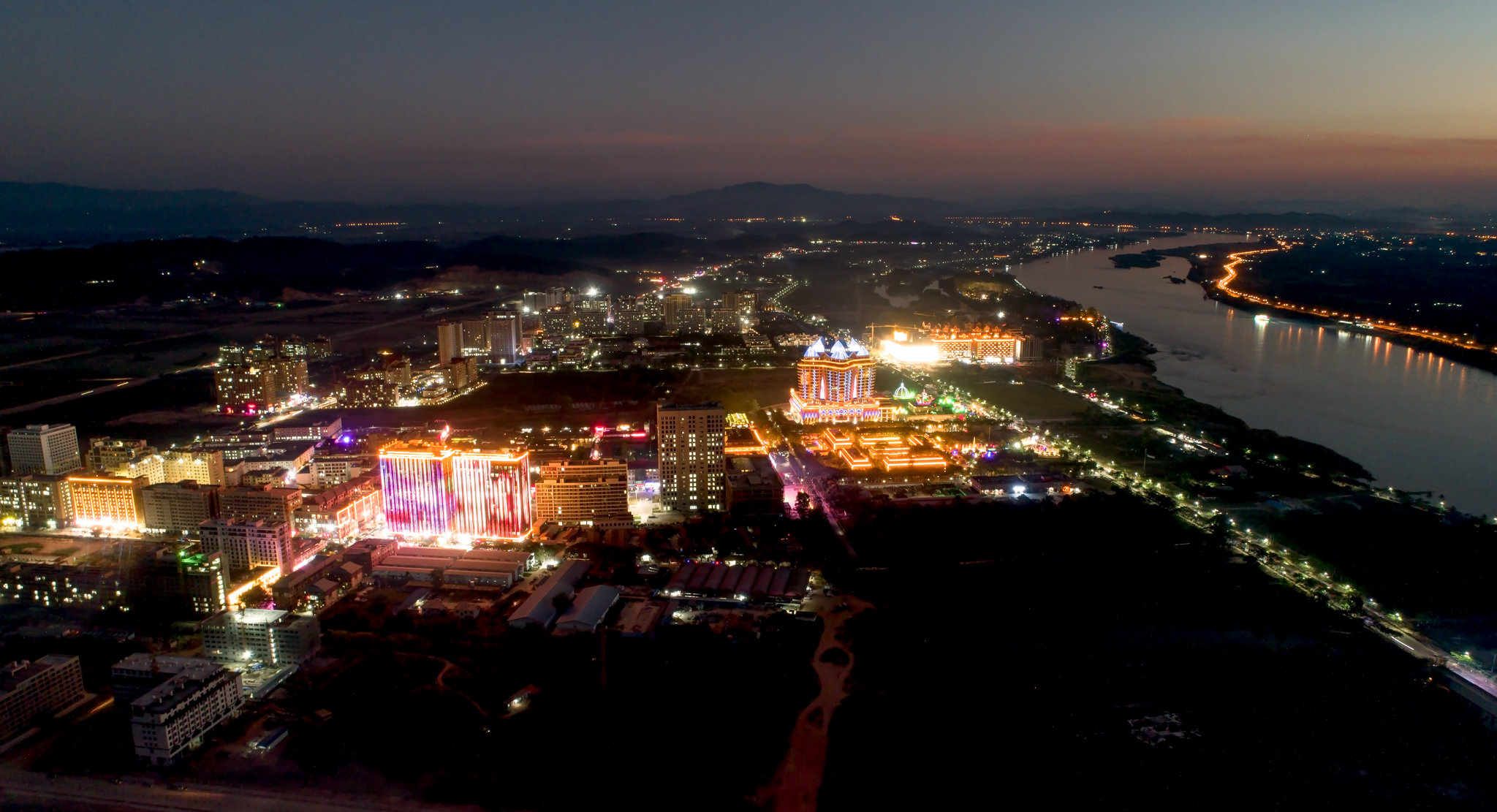
Golden Triangle SEZ skyline at the golden hour

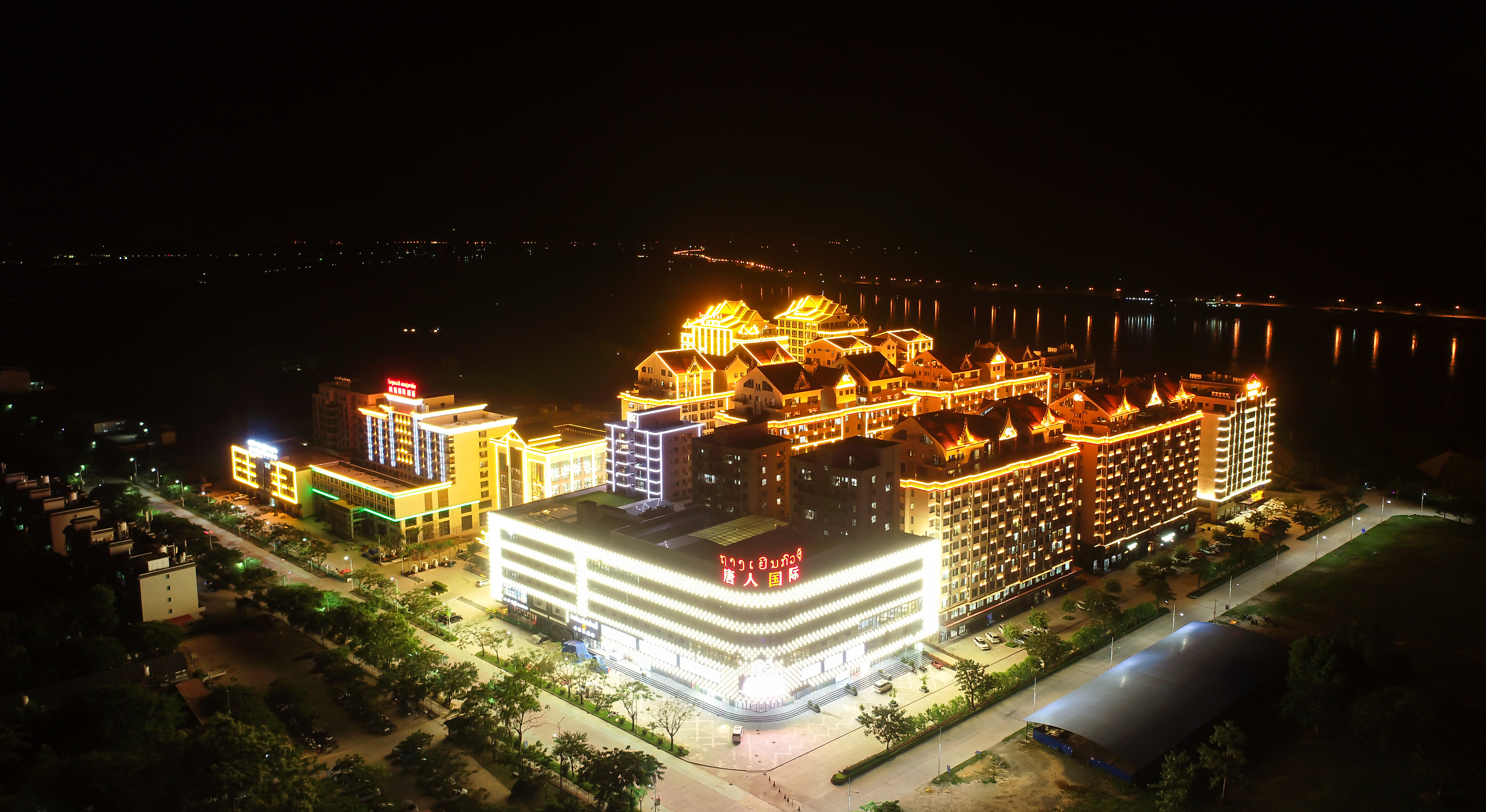
Tangran International Place

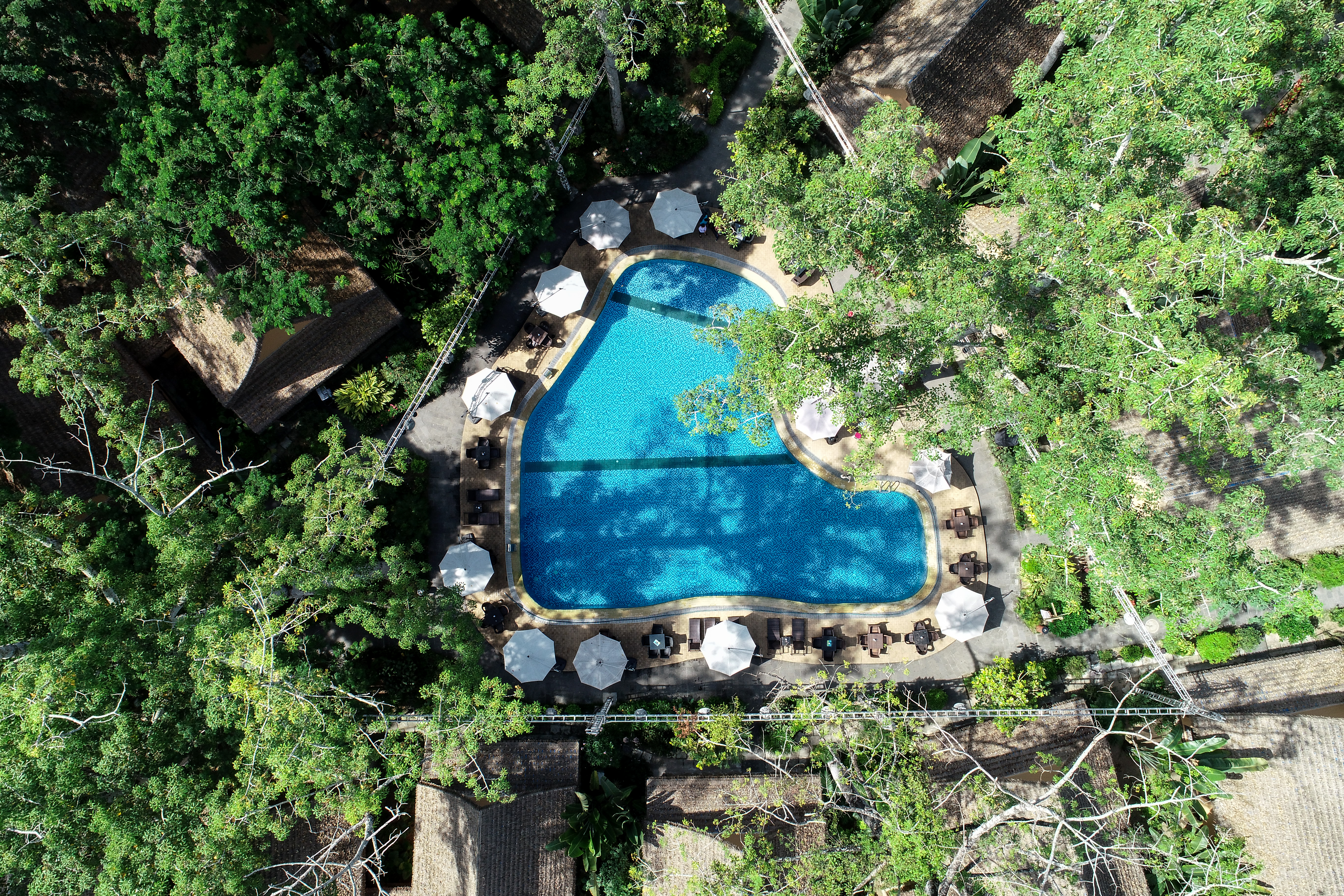
Swimming pool at the Grand Wisdom hotel

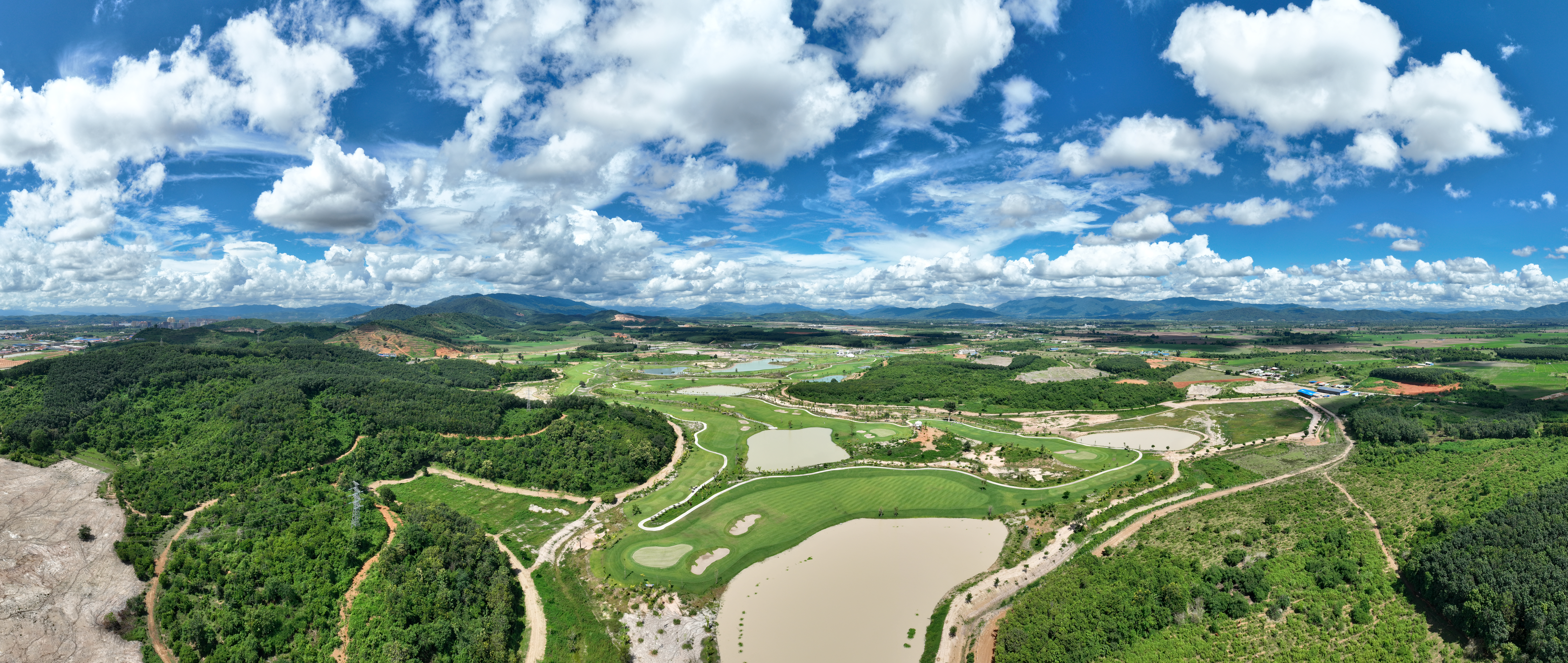
View of the Phoukewlom Mountains Golf Course and Resort
