= Chanthanome Phommany =

- ຈັນທະນອມ ພົມມະນີ
- Years active: 2003 - present

Chanthanome Phommany is a Lao businessman. He serves as the chairman of the Chaleun Sekong Group (CSG), and is a major shareholder of the Lao Development Bank (LDB).

== Career ==
Chanthanome Phommany held multiple roles in the industrial and construction sectors of Laos. From 2003 to 2007, he served as the managing director of a timber manufacturing company in the Pakse District. Between 2008 and 2011, he established the Chaleun Sekong Construction Company Limited, which eventually evolved into the Chaleun Sekong Group (CSG).

In 2021, Chaleun Sekong Energy Co., Ltd entered into a joint venture with the Lao government to privatize the Lao Development Bank (LDB). Following the agreement, CSG acquired a 70% stake in the bank, with the Ministry of Finance retaining 30%. Phommany was subsequently appointed as the chairman of the executive committee.

== Golden Triangle Special Economic Zone ==
Phommany's portfolio involves developments within the Golden Triangle Special Economic Zone (GTSEZ) in Bokeo Province. His involvement in the region is facilitated through a dedicated branch of the Lao Development Bank (LDB), which provides the financial infrastructure projects in the region. In this capacity, he has maintains partnerships with international firms, specifically Chinese entities, to focus on infrastructure and regional connectivity.

In 2026, the Laotian Times news outlet reported that Chanthanome Phommany was directly involved in allegations concerning money laundering activities carried out by LDB.

== National Economic Impact and FATF Scrutiny ==
As a stakeholder in the national financial system, Phommany has addressed the systemic challenges facing the Laotian banking sector. Following Laos’ placement on the Financial Action Task Force (FATF) "Grey List" in 2025 due to perceived deficiencies in Anti-Money Laundering (AML) frameworks, Phommany highlighted the resulting pressures on the Lao Development Bank (LDB). In his statement, Phommany has publicly acknowledged that the country's jurisdictional status complicates the ability of domestic banks to secure foreign currency reserves and maintain international correspondent banking relationships.
