= Simuang Group =

Lao business group

- Type: Private conglomerate
- Industry: Civil engineering, construction, renewable energy, and finance
- Key people: Mr. Ekaphanh Phapithack (Chairman)
- Subsidiaries: Joint Development Bank (JDB); Bitqik (Digital asset platform); Simuong Express Loan (SML); Nam Houng 1 Hydropower Co., Ltd.

Simuang Group (also spelled Simueang Group) is a business group based in Vientiane, Laos. Its interests include banking, insurance, lending and electricity generation.

== History ==
In October 2012, Simuang Group acquired Joint Development Bank (JDB), which had previously been owned by Thai investors. The acquisition resulted in JDB becoming a privately owned Lao bank. A 2026 filing with the Stock Exchange of Thailand identified Simuang Group Sole as wholly owned by Ekaphanh Phapithack and stated that the group, together with a related shareholder, held 88.61% of JDB as of 3 April 2026.

== Business activities ==
The group's associated companies have included Vientiane Insurance, Simuang Express Loan, Simuang Power and several hydroelectric power companies. A 2023 regulatory filing also listed Bitqik, a digital-asset trading platform in Laos, among companies associated with SMG Group.
