= Human trafficking in Laos =

Laos ratified the 2000 UN TIP Protocol in September 2003.

In 2008, Laos was primarily a source country for women and girls trafficked for commercial sexual exploitation and labor exploitation as domestics or factory workers in Thailand. Some Lao men, women, and children migrated to neighboring countries in search of better economic opportunities but were subjected to conditions of forced or bonded labor or forced prostitution after arrival. Some Lao men who migrated willingly to Thailand were subjected to conditions of involuntary servitude in the Thai fishing and construction industry. To a lesser extent Laos was a country of transit for Vietnamese, Chinese and Burmese women destined for Thailand. Laos' potential as a transit country was on the rise with the construction of new highways linking the People's Republic of China, Vietnam, Thailand, and Cambodia through Laos. Internal trafficking was also a problem that affects young women and girls who were trafficked for commercial sexual exploitation in urban areas.

In 2008 the Government of Laos did not fully comply with the minimum standards for the elimination of trafficking; however it made significant efforts to do so. The government increased law enforcement efforts to investigate trafficking offenses and prosecute and punish trafficking offenders. It also increased collaboration with international organizations and civil society to provide training for government and law enforcement officials, to provide repatriation and reintegration services for victims, and to launch public awareness campaigns to combat trafficking. A severe lack of resources remains the biggest impediment to the government's ability to combat trafficking in persons and it remains dependent on the international donor community to fund anti-trafficking activities.

The U.S. State Department's Office to Monitor and Combat Trafficking in Persons placed the country in "Tier 3 Watchlist" in 2018. In 2023 it was placed at Tier 2.

In 2023, the Organised Crime Index noted human trafficking was the country's most significant crime, and that it was mainly carried out by international gangs working with local low-level officials.

== Sex trafficking ==
Laos is mainly an origin country for sexually trafficked persons. A number of citizens, primarily women and girls, from all ethnic groups and foreigners have been victims of sex trafficking in Laos.

== Prosecution (2008) ==
The Lao government demonstrated progress in its anti-trafficking law enforcement efforts and willingness to collaborate with other countries as well as NGOs and international organizations. Laos prohibits all forms of trafficking through Penal Code Article 134, which prescribes penalties that are sufficiently stringent and commensurate with those prescribed for rape. In 2007, the Ministry of Public Security used Article 134 to investigate 38 cases of trafficking, resulting in 23 arrests and eight ongoing prosecutions. An additional 20 cases are currently under investigation. Police corruption, a weak judicial sector and the population's general lack of understanding of the court system impeded anti-trafficking law enforcement efforts. Through legal aid clinics, the Lao Bar Association assisted victims by educating the public at large on the legal system and by providing legal advice to victims of human rights abuses, including human trafficking. Corruption remained a problem with government officials susceptible to involvement or collusion in trafficking in persons, narcotics, wildlife, and illegal logging. No government or law enforcement officials have been disciplined or punished for involvement in trafficking in persons. The Lao government worked with international organizations and civil society to increase law enforcement capacity through training for police, investigators, prosecutors, and customs and border officials.

== Protection (2008) ==
The Lao government demonstrated progress in improving protection for victims of trafficking during the year. The Ministry of Labor and Social Welfare (MLSW) and Immigration Department cooperated with IOM, UNIAP, and a local NGO to provide victim assistance. The MLSW continued operating a small transit center in Vientiane. Victims not wanting to return home are referred to a long-term shelter run by the Lao Women's Union or to a local NGO. Over the last year, 280 formally identified victims of cross border trafficking were repatriated to Laos from Thailand and an additional 21 were repatriated in 2008. Approximately 100 victims are currently residing in rehabilitation centers in Thailand. The Lao government provided medical services, counseling, vocational training, and employment services for victims in its transit shelter in Vientiane and at the Lao Women's Union shelter. The government actively encouraged victims to participate in investigations and prosecutions of traffickers. As of January 2007, the Lao government stopped requiring exit permits for citizens to travel abroad, which eliminated the potential for penalizing illegal migrants and trafficking victims, through fines, upon their return. Government instructions against fining, and the removal of the legal basis for those fines, effectively reduced financial penalties faced by victims. The government provided land to an NGO for a new shelter and transit center for trafficking victims in Savannakhet in 2007 and it continued to provide office space and staff to assist IOM's programs.

== Prevention (2008) ==
The Lao government increased efforts to prevent trafficking in persons with assistance from international organizations and civil society. For example, the MLSW worked with UNICEF to set up awareness-raising billboards near border checkpoints and larger cities. Also, in December 2007, the Lao Youth Union held a day-long event with workshops, puppet shows, and plays to address child trafficking. The event was led by the Deputy Prime Minister and Minister of National Defense who spoke about the dangers of trafficking. The government completed its national action plan to combat trafficking in July 2007. The Government of Laos demonstrated some efforts to reduce demand for commercial sex acts through periodic raids of nightclubs and discos used as fronts for commercial sex. In October and November 2007, police shut down bars and entertainment venues used for commercial sexual activities in Luang Prabang. A general increase in tourism in Laos and a concomitant probable rise in child sex tourism in the region have attracted the attention of Lao authorities who seek to prevent child sex tourism from taking root. Vientiane Province established a task force on child sex tourism in December 2007 to coordinate efforts between the authorities and the tourism sector. The government and NGOs hosted several seminars to train tourism sector employees, including taxi drivers, on how to report suspicious behavior. Tourism police received training on guidelines drafted in July 2007 aimed at combating sex tourism and identifying potential victims. Many major international hotels in Vientiane and Luang Prabang prominently displayed posters created by international NGOs warning about child sex tourism.
