= Zhao Wei (businessman) =

Chinese businessman and alleged gangster (born 1952)

- 赵伟
- Born: 16 September 1952 (age 73); Heilongjiang or Liaoning, China
- Occupations: Businessman; drug trafficker
- Organization: Kings Romans Group

Zhao Wei (Chinese: 赵伟; pinyin: Zhào Wěi; born 16 September 1952) is a Chinese businessman and founder of the Hong Kong-registered company Kings Romans Group (formed in 2007), which owns the Kings Romans casino franchise. His "Zhao Wei Transnational Criminal Organisation" (TCO) is allegedly involved in drug trafficking, human trafficking, money laundering, bribery, wildlife trafficking, and other forms of transnational organised crime. Much of this illicit activity is allegedly conducted through the Kings Romans casino organisation in the Golden Triangle Special Economic Zone in the area of the Golden Triangle, along the Mekong River in Southeast Asia.

The Office of Foreign Assets Control of the United States Treasury Department imposed sanctions on what they designated the Zhao Wei TCO in 2018 for its alleged involvement in money laundering and assisting in the storage and distribution of heroin, methamphetamine, and other narcotics for illicit networks, including the United Wa State Army in Myanmar. Zhao faced further sanctions in 2023 from the United Kingdom for his links to human trafficking and forced criminality in scam operations in areas he controls.

== Background ==
Zhao Wei was born in Heilongjiang or Liaoning, China on 16 September 1952. He began as a timber trader before moving, in the 1990s, to Macau, where he holds permanent residency, and began investing in casinos. In 2001, Zhao Wei moved to Mong La, Myanmar where he founded his first casino franchise, Landun Entertainment. He established ties with the National Democratic Alliance Army whose leader, Sai Leun financed the operations of the casino industry in Mong La. In 2005, China imposed a travel ban to Mong La following reports of officials gambling state funds. The travel ban led to the shuttering of casinos in the city.

== Golden Triangle Special Economic Zone ==
Soon after the travel ban was imposed, Zhao was invited by the government of Laos to invest in Bokeo Province. In 2007, Zhao negotiated and struck a 99-year lease to establish and operate the Golden Triangle Special Economic Zone in the same province. In early October 2020, a US$50 million dollar investment to build a port in the Laotian town of Ban Mom, directly north of the Golden Triangle Special Economic Zone, was made by Osiano Trading Sole Co., a partner or front company of Zhao Wei and his organization. The United Nations Office on Drugs and Crime (UNODC) has raised concerns about Laos being used by organized crime to traffic drugs, precursor chemicals, and other illicit commodities, and that the purchase of the Ban Mom port is representative of organized crime infiltrating infrastructure in the region. The Ban Mom port is on a remote stretch of the Mekong which has been confirmed as a smuggling route for trafficking drugs and precursor chemicals into and out of the Golden Triangle.

In recent years the Golden Triangle Special Economic Zone has become closely associated with the spread of cyber-enabled fraud and online gambling operations. In 2023, the United Kingdom sanctioned Zhao Wei under the Global Human Rights Sanctions Regulations 2020 on the grounds that he is responsible for, supported and obtained benefit from activity which violates the right not to be subjected to torture or cruel, inhumane or degrading treatment or punishment, or right to be free from slavery, not to be held in servitude or required to perform forced or compulsory labour. This related specifically to trafficking of people into the Golden Triangle Special Economic Zone, where they were “forced to work as scammers targeting English-speaking individuals and subject to physical abuse and further cruel, inhumane and degrading treatment or punishment.”

Multiple law enforcement actions have taken place in the Golden Triangle Special Economic Zone specifically targeting online scam operations. Hundreds of Chinese nationals have been detained and deported to China suspected of engaging in online crimes in the zone since at least as far back as 2016.

The United Nations Office on Drugs and Crime (UNODC) has reported that Zhao Wei also has deep ties with the United Wa State Army (UWSA), which controls autonomous regions in neighbouring Myanmar. In 2008, OFAC sanctioned 26 individuals and 17 companies with links to the UWSA operating in Southeast Asia and sanctioned them as Specially Designated Narcotics Traffickers pursuant to the Foreign Narcotics Kingpin Designation Act (Kingpin Act), recognizing their major role in drug trafficking in Southeast Asia. One of these entities was Shuen Wai Holding, registered in Hong Kong at the same address used for registration of Zhao Wei’s Kings Romans International in 2009.

The UNODC has also noted that Zhao Wei and his organization have expanded their operations to neighbouring countries including Cambodia in recent years. It also reported connections between Zhao Wei and alleged criminal actors operating from the Isle of Man, including one unnamed company whose offices were raided in April 2024 by Isle of Man constabulary in connection to a wider fraud and money laundering investigation.

== Personal life ==
Zhao Wei is married to Chinese Australian Su Guiqin (born 1960), who runs the Kings Romans casino alongside her husband. Su Guiqin was also sanctioned by OFAC alongside Zhao Wei and other associates in 2018, and was also subject to the sanctions implemented by the United Kingdom in 2023.
