= Joint Development Bank =

Commercial bank in Laos

- Native name: ທະນາຄານຮ່ວມພັດທະນາ
- Type: Private
- Industry: Banking
- Founded: October 1989; 36 years ago
- Area served: Laos
- Owner: Simuong Group
- Website: www.jdbbank.com.la

Joint Development Bank (JDB) is a commercial bank in Laos, headquartered in Vientiane. It was established in 1989 during the development of Laos's two-tier banking system. The International Monetary Fund described JDB as the first private-sector participation in Laos's banking industry, with 70% of its equity initially provided by Thai investors and 30% by the Bank of the Lao P.D.R.

== History ==
JDB began operations in October 1989 as a joint-venture commercial bank between Lao and Thai interests. In 2010, the Bank of the Lao P.D.R. sold its stake to Thai investors, making JDB a foreign-invested bank. In October 2012, the bank was acquired by the Lao Simuang Group and became a privately owned Lao bank.

== Operations ==
JDB provides commercial banking and financial services in Laos. Its activities have included deposit-taking, lending, domestic and international money transfers and electronic banking services. In 2024, the bank marked its 35th anniversary and reported continued expansion of its digital banking services.
