= List of rivers of Laos =

This is a list of rivers in Laos.

== By drainage basin ==
This list is arranged by drainage basin, with respective tributaries indented under each larger stream's name.

=== South China Sea ===
- Mekong
  - Xekong River
    - Vang Ngao River
    - Nam Khong River
    - Xe Namnoy River (Xe Namnoi)
      - Houay Ho River
    - Houay Tekok River
    - Xe Kaman River
      - Nam Pagnou River
      - Xe Xou River
    - Huai Het River
  - Tonle Repou
  - Dôn River
  - Banghiang River (Xe Banghiang River)
    - Sepon River (Xepon River)
    - Xe Lanong River
    - Xe Champhone River
  - Xe Bang Fai River
    - Xe Noy River
  - Nam Hinboun
    - Nam Pakan
  - Nam Theun (Kading River)
  - Nam Xan River
  - Nam Ngiep
  - Nam Ngum
    - Nam Lik
      - Nam Song
  - Hueang River (Huang River)
  - Nam Xeuang |Nam Sɯaŋ| (Xeuang River)
    - Nam Xèng (Xèng River—a tributary of the Xeuang River)
  - Nam Khan
  - Nam Ou
    - Nam Phak
  - Nam Bèng
  - Nam Tha River
    - Nam Di River

=== Gulf of Tonkin ===
- Ma River
  - Nam Sam River (Xam River)
  - Èt River
- Cả River
  - Nam Neun
