= Xayden =

Xayden ບ້ານ ຊາເດນ
- Village
- Location in Laos
- Coordinates: 14°43′27″N 107°29′51″E
- Country: Laos
- Province: Attepeu
- District: Phouvong
- Elevation: 1,060.58 m (3,479.6 ft)
- Time zone: UTC+7 (ICT)
- Climate: Am (Tropical monsoon)

Xayden or Ban Xayden (ບ້ານ ຊາເດນ) (also spelled Xaydèn or Xay Den) is a village in Phouvong District, Attapeu province, southeastern Laos. It lies in a heavily forested valley along Route 11, about 3.1 kilometres (1.9 mi) southeast of the Xe Xou River, near the border with Vietnam.

== Geography ==
Xayden lies in a heavily forested valley in the mountainous far south-east of the country, along Route 11, 8.9 kilometres (5.5 mi) from the Phou Keua International Border Checkpoint on the border with Vietnam. The settlement is situated about 3.1 kilometres (1.9 mi) southeast of the Xe Xou River.

== Landmarks ==
The village contains a coffee bar named Dao Coffee. There is a hotel, Nam Phat Hotel, to the northwest on the bank of the Xe Xou River.
