= Xaisi =

- Village
- Location in Laos
- Coordinates: 14°47′N 106°53′E
- Country: Laos
- Province: Attopu Province

Xaisi or Ban Xaisi is a river village in Attopu Province, in southern Laos. It is located just east of the provincial capital of Attopu, not far west of Xaysetha.
