= Tamoyot =

- Village
- Country: Laos
- Province: Attapeu Province
- District: Sanamxay District

Population
  - Total: 158

Tamoyot or Ban Tamoyot is a village in Sanamxay District in Attapeu Province, in southern Laos. It is located 13 kilometres from Sanamxai and lies on the banks of the Se Kamon River. The village, as of 2004, has a population of 158 people and 28 houses. Most of the villagers are from the Su ethnic group and rely heavily on rice farming and fishing.
