= Ban Vongxay =

- Location in Laos
- Coordinates: 14°32′N 107°9′E
- Country: Laos
- Province: Attopu Province
- Time zone: UTC + 7

Ban Vongxay is a village in Phouvong District in the Attopu Province of south-eastern Laos.
