= Ban Vianglouang =

- Location in Laos
- Coordinates: 14°33′N 107°13′E
- Country: Laos
- Province: Attapeu Province
- Time zone: UTC+7 (ICT)

Ban Vianglouang is a village in Phouvong District in the Attapeu Province of southeastern Laos.
