= Ban Gnangteu =

- Location in Laos
- Coordinates: 14°37′N 107°5′E
- Country: Laos
- Province: Attapeu Province
- Time zone: UTC+7 (ICT)

Ban Gnangteu is a village in Phouvong District in Attapeu Province of southeastern Laos.
