= Ban Phiakhamkak =

- Location in Laos
- Coordinates: 14°31′N 106°57′E
- Country: Laos
- Province: Attopu Province
- Time zone: UTC + 7

Ban Phiakhamkak is a village in Phouvong District in the Attopu Province of southeast Laos.
