= Ban Arapruich =

- Village
- Location in Laos
- Coordinates: 14°28′N 106°47′E
- Country: Laos
- Province: Attapeu Province
- Time zone: UTC+7 (ICT)

Ban Arapruich is a village in Phouvong District in Attapeu Province of southeastern Laos.
