= Sanamxai =

- Town
- Location in Laos
- Coordinates: 14°40′57″N 106°34′58″E
- Country: Laos
- Province: Attapeu Province
- District: Sanamxay District
- Time zone: UTC+7 (ICT)

Sanamxai, Sanamxay, or Muang Sanamxai is a small river town on the Xe Kong River in Attapeu Province, in southern Laos. It is the capital of Sanamxay District. It is downriver from the provincial capital of Attapeu and is connected by Lao National Highway 18.
