= Ban Lomlay =

- Location in Laos
- Coordinates: 14°33′N 107°1′E
- Country: Laos
- Province: Attopu Province
- Time zone: UTC + 7

Ban Lomlay is a village in Phouvong District in Attopu Province of south-eastern Laos.
