= Ban Ekchoum-Phoukaniang =

- Location in Laos
- Coordinates: 14°27′N 106°57′E
- Country: Laos
- Province: Attapeu Province
- Time zone: UTC+7 (ICT)

Ban Ekchoum-Phoukaniang is a village in Phouvong District in Attapeu Province of southeastern Laos.
