= Ban Phomoun Gnai =

- Location in Laos
- Coordinates: 14°30′N 107°4′E
- Country: Laos
- Province: Attopu Province
- Time zone: UTC + 7

Ban Phomoun Gnai is a village in Phouvong District in the Attapeu province of south-eastern Laos.
