= Ban Kongmi =

- Location in Laos
- Coordinates: 14°31′N 106°55′E
- Country: Laos
- Province: Attopu Province
- Time zone: UTC + 7

Ban Kongmi is a village in Phouvong District in Attopu Province of south-eastern Laos.
