= Xaysetha =

- Town
- Location in Laos
- Coordinates: 14°48′52″N 106°56′4″E
- Country: Laos
- Province: Attapeu Province
- District: Saysetha
- Time zone: UTC+7 (ICT)

Xaysetha also Saysetha , Saisettha is a river town in Attapeu Province, in southern Laos. It is the capital of Saysetha District. It is several kilometres east of the provincial capital of Attapeu and is connected by Lao National Highway 11.
