= Xaysetha District =

Xaysetha District may refer to:

- Saysetha District, a district in Attapeu Province in Laos
- Xaysetha District (Vientiane), a district in Vientiane Prefecture in Laos
