= Bantoanon =

Bantoanon may refer to:

- Bantoanon language, also called Asi, a regional Visayan language spoken in Romblon Province, Philippines

== See also ==
- Ban Tanong, a village in Attopu Province, Laos
- Banton, Romblon, a municipality in Romblon Province, Philippines
