= Ban Chom =

- Location in Laos
- Coordinates: 14°33′N 107°3′E
- Country: Laos
- Province: Attapeu Province
- Time zone: UTC+7 (ICT)

Ban Chom is a village in Phouvong District in Attapeu Province of southeastern Laos.
