= Ban Senkhamphon =

- Location in Laos
- Coordinates: 14°35′N 107°1′E
- Country: Laos
- Province: Attopu Province
- Time zone: UTC + 7

Ban Senkhamphon is a village in Phouvong District in the Attopu Province of south-eastern Laos.
