= Ban Phianong =

- Location in Laos
- Coordinates: 14°34′N 106°59′E
- Country: Laos
- Province: Attopu Province
- Time zone: UTC + 7

Ban Phianong is a village in Phouvong District in the Attopu Province of south-eastern Laos.
