= Ban Onglouang =

- Location in Laos
- Coordinates: 14°43′N 107°13′E
- Country: Laos
- Province: Attapeu Province
- Time zone: UTC+7 (ICT)

Ban Onglouang is a village in Phouvong District of Attapeu Province of southeastern Laos.
