= Sanamxay district =

Sanamxay district ເມືອງສະໜາມໄຊ
- District
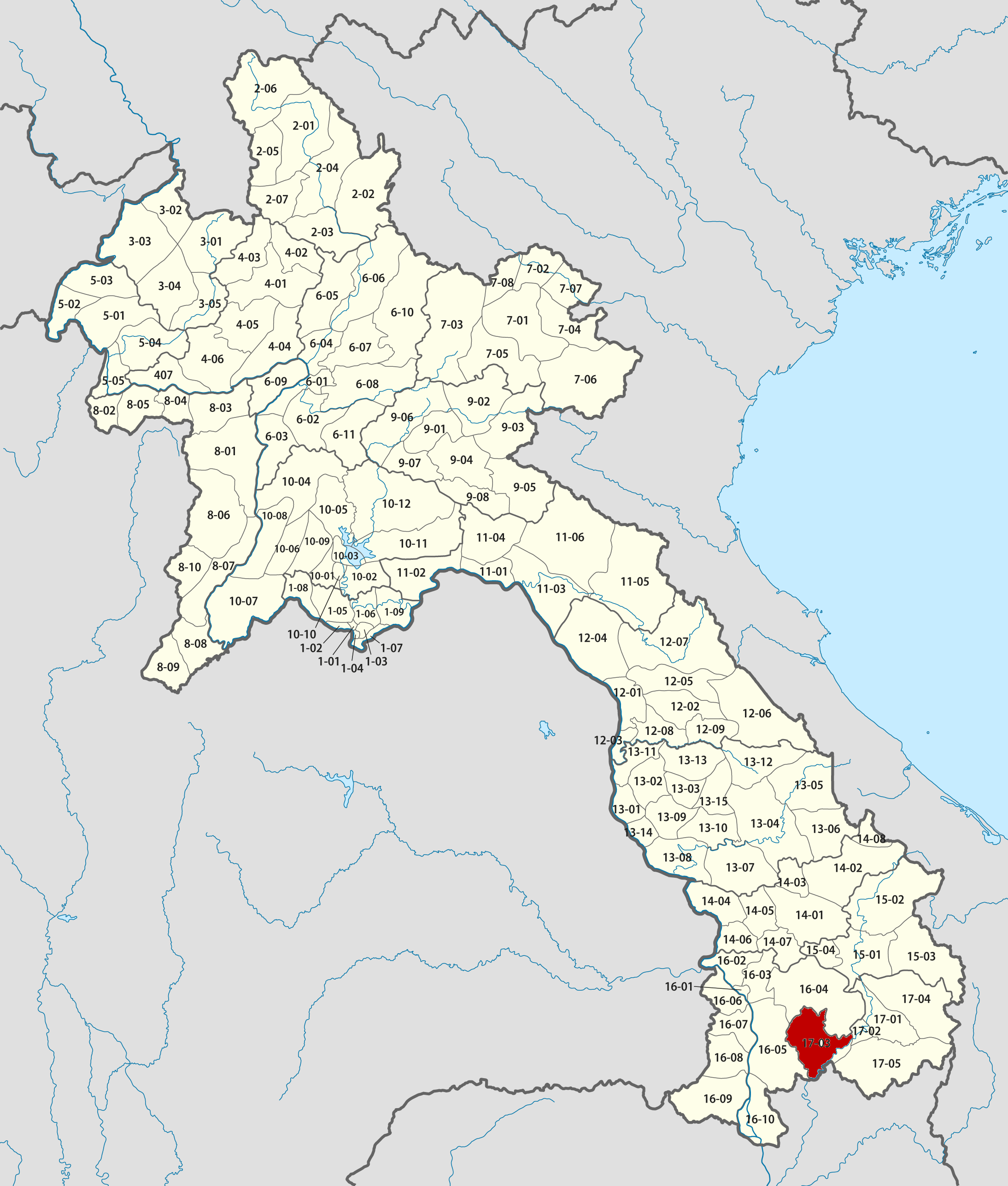
- Location in Laos
- Country: Laos
- Province: Attapeu province
- Time zone: UTC+7 (ICT)

Sanamxay is a district (muang) of Attapeu province in southern Laos.

== Towns and villages ==
- Sanamxai
- Tamoyot
