= Sanxay district =

Sanxay district ເມືອງສານໄຊ
- District
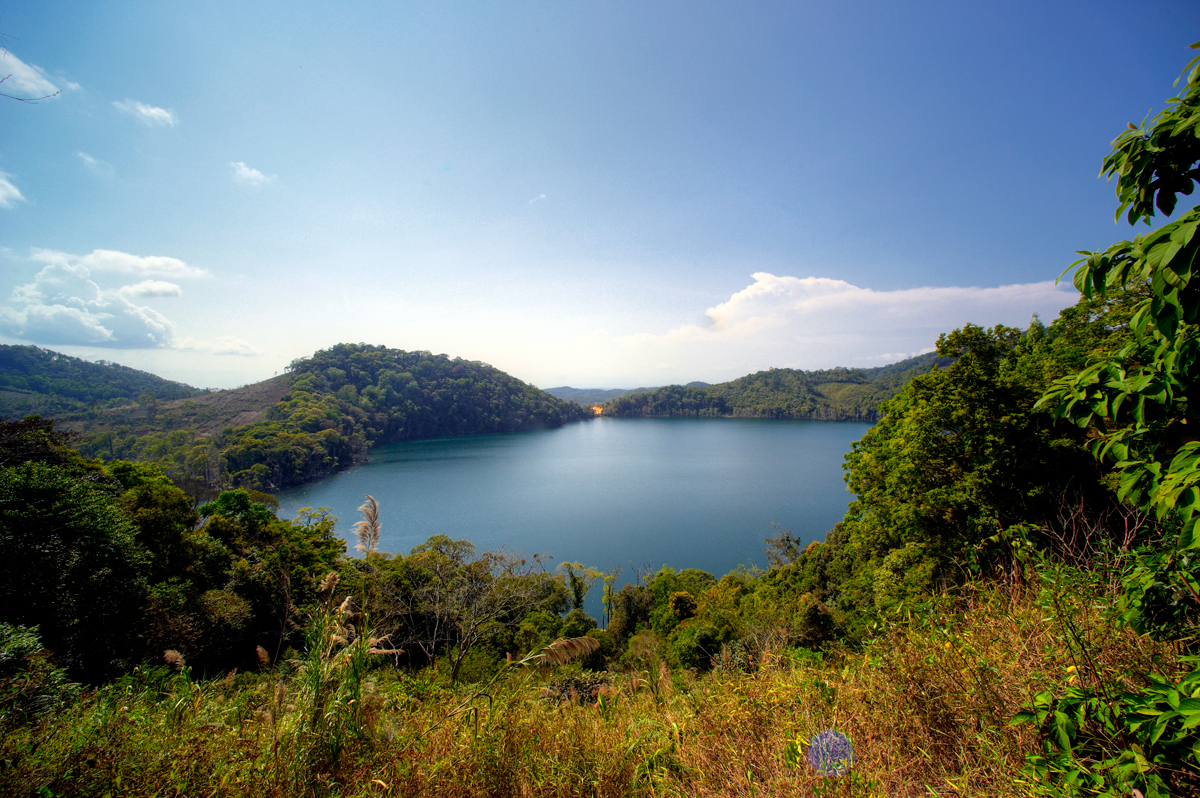
- Nong Fa Lake

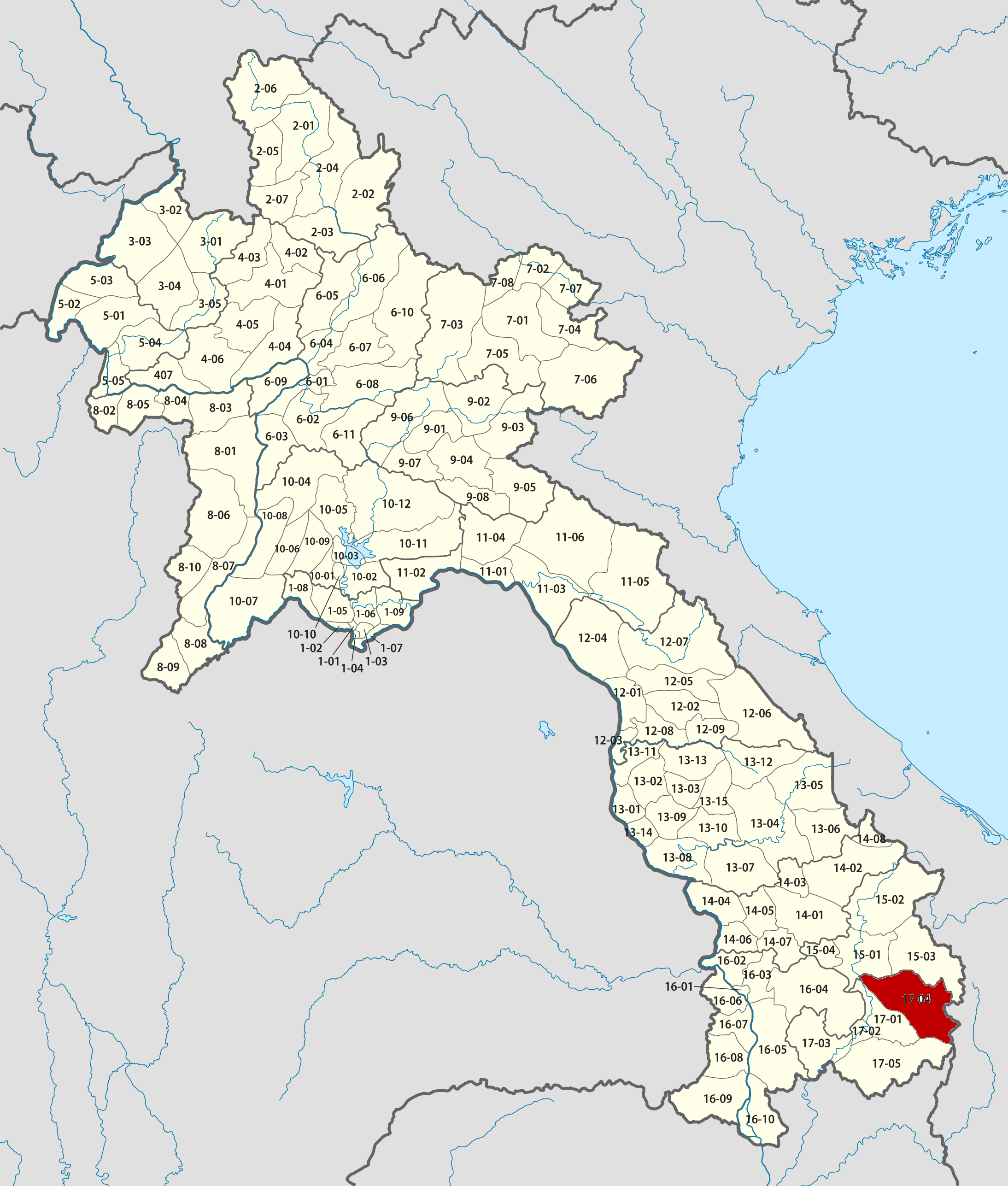
- Location in Laos
- Country: Laos
- Province: Attapeu
- Time zone: UTC+7 (ICT)

Sanxay is a district (muang) of Attapeu province in southern Laos.
