= Rheinart d'Arfeuille =

French colonial administrator

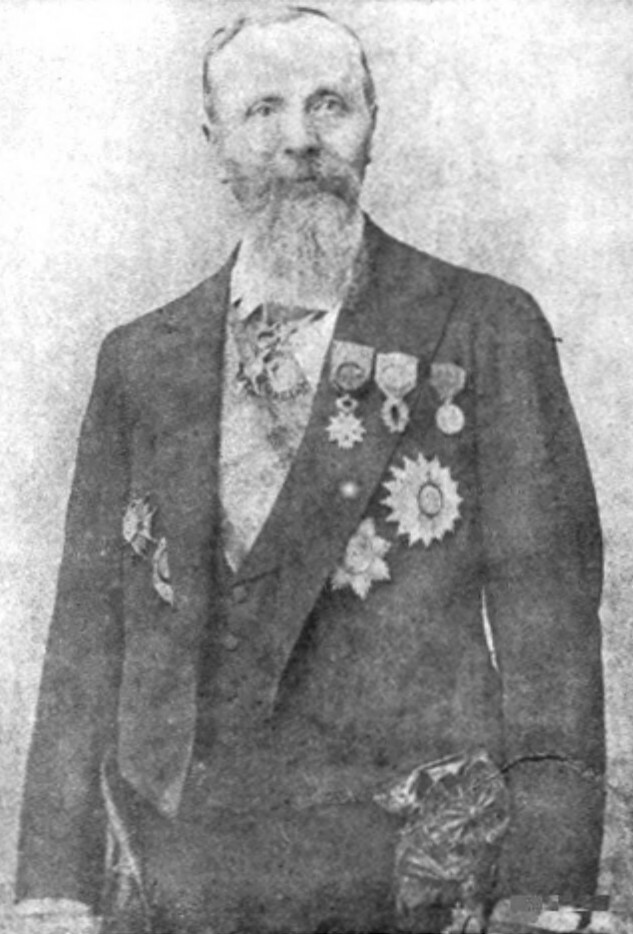
Pierre Paul Rheinart post-retirement

Pierre-Paul Rheinart d'Arfeuille (1 November 1840 – 1902) was a French colonial administrator, active in Indochina during the late 19th century. He was an explorer of the Mekong from 1869, and later served as Chargé d'Affaires in Hué, the imperial capital of Annam, from 1875–1876, 1879–1880, and 1881–1883, and as Résident Général from June to October 1884 and 1888–1889.

== Life and career ==
Born on 1 November 1840 in Charleville-Mézières, France, Rheinart graduated from the École spéciale militaire de Saint-Cyr and rose to the rank of captain in the marine infantry before transitioning to colonial administration in 1865. He later attained the rank of lieutenant colonel.

In 1869, Rheinart led an expedition to Laos with naval officer Charles Mourin d'Arfeuille to assess the region's resources and the navigability of the Mekong River, including surveys of rapids from Préapatang to the Khone Falls for potential steamship routes. He visited Attapeu province in what is now southeastern Laos during this period.

D'Arfeuille began his colonial service in 1874 as the French representative in Hanoi, where a garrison was established under the initial treaty establishing a protectorate over Annam. He served as Chargé d'Affaires in Hué, the imperial capital of Annam, from 1875–1876, 1879–1880, and 1881–1883, and as Résident Général from June to October 1884 and 1888–1889, managing Annam's external relations, residing in the imperial citadel with a military escort, and holding private audiences with the Annamese king to enforce the protectorate.

In 1889, he oversaw the coronation of Emperor Thanh Thai, earning the title "Luong quôc quân vuong" (equivalent to Grand Duke). He died in Paris in 1902.

== Personal life ==
An avid hunter, Rheinart collected trophies such as an elephant skull, as documented by his son’s memoirs. He donated significant artifacts to his hometown of Domfront, including a 19th-century red and gold lacquered wooden Buddha statue from Annam, an Annamese throne, and an elephant skull. He resided at La Hamardière in Domfront, Orne from 1889 to 1891.
