= Domfront, Orne =

Domfront
- Part of Domfront-en-Poiraie
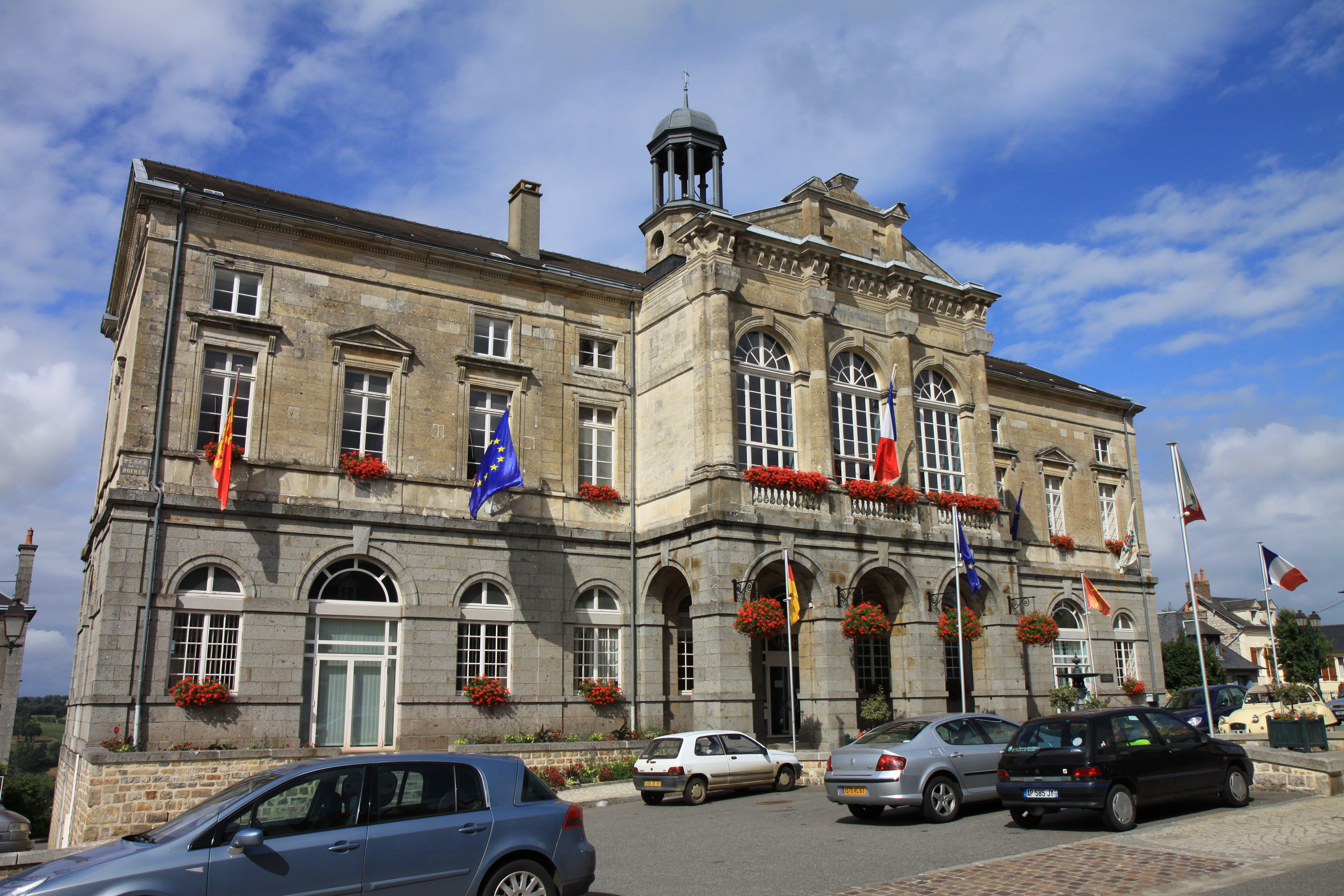
- The city hall

- Coat of arms
- Location of Domfront
- Location within France Location within Normandy
- Coordinates: 48°31′10″N 0°45′23″W
- Country: France
- Region: Normandy
- Department: Orne
- Arrondissement: Alençon
- Canton: Domfront (chef-lieu)
- Commune: Domfront-en-Poiraie
- Area^{1}: 35.54 km^{2} (13.72 sq mi)
- Elevation: 135 m (443 ft)
- Highest elevation: 256 m (840 ft)
- Lowest elevation: 117 m (384 ft)
- Population (2022): 3,414
  - Density: 96.06/km^{2} (248.8/sq mi)
- Demonym: Domfrontais
- Time zone: UTC+01:00 (CET)
  - Summer (DST): UTC+02:00 (CEST)
- Postal code: 61700
- Website: www.ville-domfront.fr
- ^{1} French Land Register data, which excludes lakes, ponds, glaciers > 1 km^{2} (0.386 sq mi or 247 acres) and river estuaries.

Domfront (French pronunciation: [dɔ̃fʁɔ̃]) is a former commune in the Orne department in north-western France. It is classed as a Petites Cités de Caractère. On 1 January 2016, it was merged into the new commune of Domfront-en-Poiraie.

== Geography ==
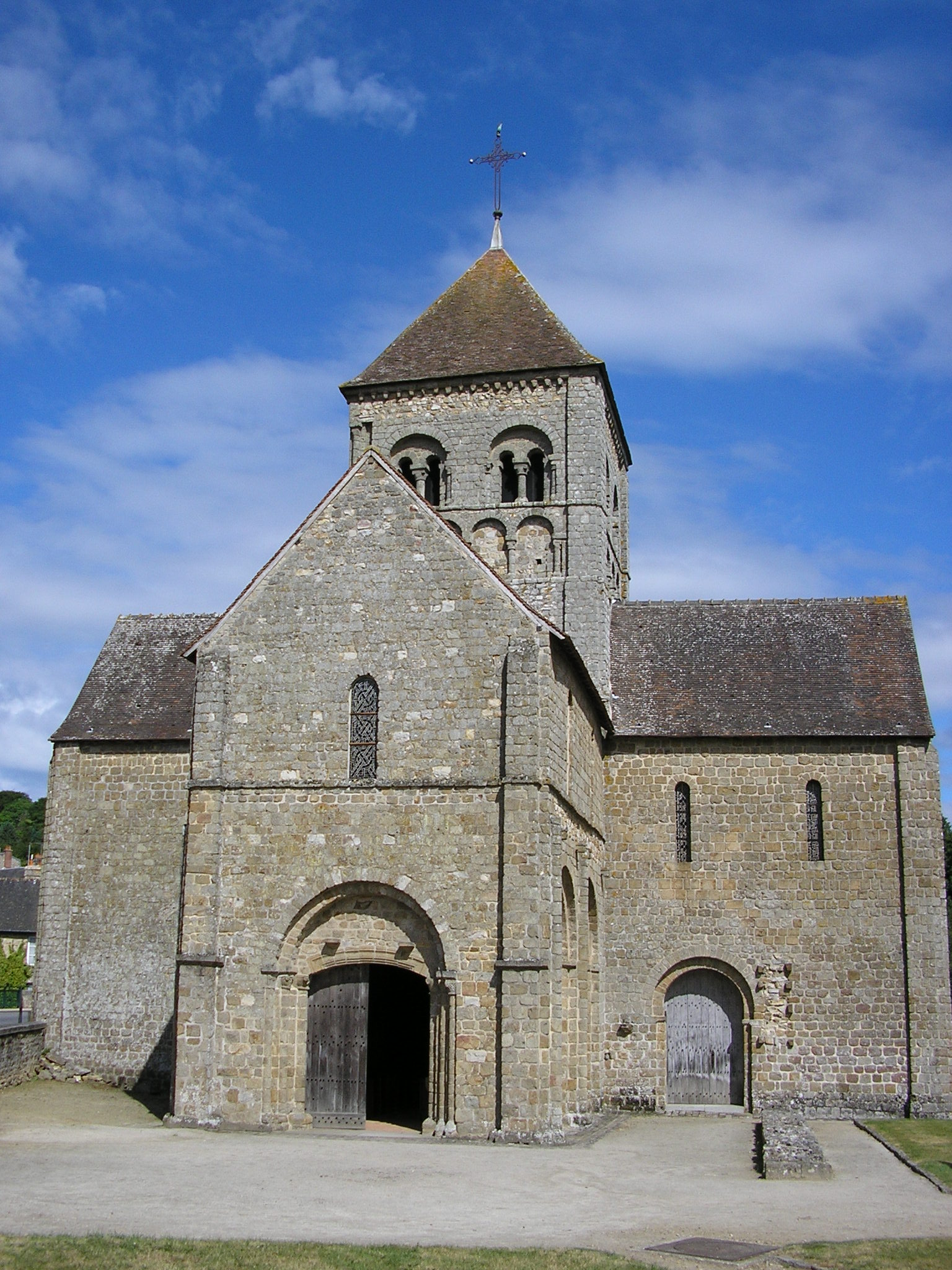
The Romanesque church Notre-Dame-sur-L'eau

Domfront is situated on a bluff overlooking the river Varenne and is said to have been established in the 6th century round the oratory of the hermit St. Front, and played an important part in the wars against the English and the French Wars of Religion. Beginning from the strategically sited castle of Domfront, the dispossessed count Henry, youngest son of William the Conqueror, rallied support among local lords and eventually ruled the Anglo-Norman dominions as Henry I of England.

In 1574 it was occupied by the Protestant leader Gabriel, comte de Montgomery, who after a stubborn siege was forced to yield it to Jacques Goyon, Count of Matignon.

It has been subjected to floods when the river Varenne burst its banks, causing widespread havoc and damage to many of the buildings and houses that lay in its path. On 23 December 2020 occurred the highest on record since 1995, when les tanneries were badly affected with the ancient stone bridge being impassable.

== History ==
Middle Ages

In the Middle Ages, the site was the center of an important strategic region. The first village was built around a chapel built around 540 by the hermit Front.

In 1010, Guillaume de Bellême had the first wooden castle built at the top of the rock, the Château, consisting of "four large towers with deep ditches cut into the rock", whose "main exit was to the south; two iron gates and a claie closed the entrance ". After his death, in around 1031, his grandson Geoffroy, son of Guérin, Count of Mortagne, was dispossessed of the fortress by his uncle, Guillaume le Cruel, Lord of Alençon, and was at the origin of the long rivalry between the Lords of Mortagne and Alençon. Guillaume d'Alençon's cruelties led his subjects to surrender Alençon and Domfront to Geoffroy Martel, Count of Anjou. In 1048, the latter laid siege to Domfront and briefly took control. Guillaume Talvas regained possession thanks to the intervention of the Duke of Normandy. The inhabitants, fed up with William the Cruel's conduct, revolted again and gave themselves to Henry I Beauclerc, third son of William the Conqueror.

In 1092, Henri I Beauclerc erected a fortified stone castle on the rocky spur, complete with a powerful quadrangular keep and the Saint-Symphorien chapel, a priory of the Lonlay abbey. In 1100, Henri Beauclerc became King of England, and in order to avoid a fratricidal war with his elder brother, Robert Curthose, who claimed the kingdom of England, relinquished Cotentin and all his possessions in Normandy to the latter, with the exception of Domfront, which became a royal stronghold. Along with Argentan, Alençon and Mortagne-au-Perche, Domfront was part of Henry I Beauclerc's stone belt. On the death of the King of England, the captain of the fortress surrendered it to Étienne de Blois, Count of Mortain. Mathilde, daughter and heiress of Henry I, and her husband, Geoffroy Plantagenet, came to lay siege to Domfront, which they captured after several assaults.

Henry II Plantagenet and Eleanor of Aquitaine, his wife, and Richard the Lionheart and John Lackland, their sons, stayed here. In particular, Eleanor of Aquitaine held court here, as did her daughter Marie de Champagne (protector of Chrétien de Troyes, who accompanied her). Wace was also part of this court, as was Benoît de Sainte-Maure, who does not name it, but praises it in his Roman de Troie, a kind of dedication.

The first two link Domfront and its region to Arthurian legends.

In August 1161, Eleanor of Aquitaine gave birth to Eleanor of England, future grandmother of Saint Louis.

After Philip Augustus conquered Normandy in 1204, the stronghold became Capetian.

During the Hundred Years' War, the castle was occupied by the English from 1356 to 1366 and from 1418 to 1450. In the summer of 1450, Charles VII's royal army recaptured the castle after a twenty-day siege.

Modern era

In 1574, the Norman Huguenot leader Gabriel I de Montgommery, who had taken refuge in Domfront after fleeing Saint-Lô, surrendered during the siege of the town after the arrival of the royal artillery. Catherine de Medici immediately had him tried by the Paris Parliament, followed by his execution by beheading in the Place de Grève on June 26, 1574. In 1608, the château was dismantled by order of Henry IV.

Six years later, from 1633 to 1639, the plague returned to Domfront.

Contemporary era

Domfront was chief town of the Domfront district during the Revolution, then became chief town of the Domfront arrondissement.

In 1863, Domfront (2,909 inhabitants in 1861) absorbed Saint-Front (2,252 inhabitants).

War 1914-1918

During the World War I, the 3rd Battalion of the 130th Infantry Regiment, housed in the Laharpe barracks, left on August 5, 1914. The 130th Infantry Regiment's headquarters were located in Mayenne. This regiment, incorporated into the 7th Infantry Division, suffered appalling losses on August 22, 1914 on the Belgian front around Virton and Ethe. The division was transferred to various army corps and took part in all the major battles of the war.

Between the wars

On September 10, 1926, following the Poincaré decree, Domfront lost its sub-prefecture and the cantons were divided between the arrondissements of Alençon and Argentan.

World war II

In September 1939, the people of Domfront wept as they watched the 3rd Battalion of the 130th RI march down to the station. This regiment was incorporated into the 8th Infantry Division, 3rd Army, Army Group 2, under General Prételat. This army, positioned behind the Maginot Line, did not fight until after the fall of Dunkirk. The 130th RI was completely taken prisoner.

During the Occupation, Domfront was home to three permanent German units: the gendarmerie, which represented the German occupation administration and carried out requisitions; the railway station, which was commanded by a company of engineers who controlled the railroads; and the Laharpe barracks, where a unit of Territoriaux guarded the Senegalese infantrymen held there as prisoners of war. German police duties were carried out by the Alençon section of the SD and, for serious cases, by the Rouen section.

The occupation intensified in February 1944, with the Germans forcing Domfronters to build structures to reinforce Domfront's defenses in the event of a landing, and to work on the construction of an ammunition and fuel depot in the Andaine forest. On January 17, 1944, a German soldier was wounded during the night, and Mayor Gallot was asked to designate hostages. Gallot refused, was dismissed and Domfront residents were taken at random from the streets by German policemen from Alençon. Some were deported to Germany.

Domfront, located between the Andaine forest ammunition depot and Mortain, where the great German counter-attack took place, and especially the station district (now called Notre-Dame), were subjected to numerous Allied air attacks. The most deadly bombing raids were those of Friday evening June 2, 1944 (twenty-four twin-engine planes) on the station, which killed eight people and a child, and that of June 14, 1944 on the lower town by B17 bombers, which killed 37 people and destroyed 494 buildings. A total of thirty-six civilians (not all of whom were Domfront residents - the figure is uncertain) were killed in the twenty-four air attacks, mainly on the railway station.

On August 7, a Waffen-SS armored unit from Flers crossed the railway station district towards Saint-Mars-d'Égrenne to attack towards Mortain. After the German defeat in front of Mortain, the remaining armored units withdrew to Falaise, and only low-combat troops held Domfront. On August 13, American forces, scalded by the Mortenais episode, randomly fired cannons at the town. Some Domfronters decided to go to meet them, to stop the firing and help them enter the town. On August 14, a firefighter managed to rally them on the Saint-Mars road and led a column (seven vehicles) around the town to the west. It passed through Saint-Gilles-des-Marais and La Haute-Chapelle, where it captured a German company on the Sainte-Anne knoll (hill 210 on staff maps), then crossed the mined Caen bridge on foot. It captured an artillery piece at the Balères farm, then passed through the Pissot and entered Domfront from the north, by the staircase just behind the town hall.

Other American troops had already entered the town from the south, and the German forces still in the town, seeing themselves surrounded, surrendered without a fight. Some German soldiers, often Malgré-nous drawn from the USSR front, seemed rather relieved, but the officers were very vexed. No one was killed when the town was liberated.

The number of civilians killed, in relation to the tonnage of bombs dropped on Domfront and the railway station, was relatively low. This was due to three factors:

- the communication routes did not run through the old town, which was more densely populated at the time;
- passive defense succeeded in convincing the people of Domfront to evacuate the vicinity of the communication routes;
- the airmen made a blank pass over the target and returned to bomb, giving civilians a little time to move away, if only by a few hundred meters.

During the Battle of Normandy, the Germans requisitioned the Perrou old people's home and orphanage for a military hospital. On their arrival, the Americans set up a fully mobile hospital near the Guyardière manor house, where Domfront's civilian hospital had been withdrawn.

On November 11, 1948, the commune was awarded the Croix de Guerre 1939-1945.

== Culture ==
Standing on a promontory, the town boasts a rich heritage of medieval half-timbered houses, old 17th and 18th century hotels and narrow streets.

Places and monuments

Domfront boasts five buildings protected as historic monuments :

- Domfront medieval castle: keep listed as a historic monument in 1875, ramparts, towers, bretches, casemates and former chapels listed since 1986.
- Saint-Symphorien de Domfront Priory, run by Benedictine monks, within the castle walls. Its former chapel is listed with the castle.
- Prieuré Saint-Antoine de Domfront, (Benedictine nuns), and Hôtel-Dieu Saint-Antoine de Domfront, both buildings were destroyed. They stood on the site of today's town hall. The town wall was partially listed as a historic monument by decree of April 9, 1929.
- The 11th-century Notre-Dame-sur-l'Eau church. This Romanesque edifice was listed as a historic monument in 1840. The church was completely restored in 2024, and the tombstones were reassembled to prevent flooding, thanks to a major private donation.
- The Saint-Julien church, built from 1924 to 1933 by architect Albert Guilbert (a French example of neo-Byzantine religious architecture using the Hennebique reinforced concrete process), was listed as a historic monument by decree of March 25, 1993. Due to damage to the concrete, it was closed to the public in 2006. After work to reinforce the arches supporting the 1,500 tonnes of the 55-metre-high bell tower, the church was reopened in 2013. The organ was installed by Gloton in 1931.
- The 16th-century Manoir de la Palue, partially listed as a historic monument by decree on March 30, 1976, and November 23, 2004.
- Manoir de la Chaslerie, built in the late 16th and 17th centuries, partially listed as a historic monument.

The commune also includes buildings and sites listed in the Inventaire général du patrimoine culturel (General Inventory of Cultural Heritage).

- Saint-Symphorien chapel in the château.
- The château garden is the subject of a pre-inventory study as a remarkable garden.
- The flour mill, which ceased operating after 1926.
- Varenne valley.
- La Varenne and the Domfront keep; Washhouse.
- The Collière garden is the subject of a pre-inventory study as a remarkable garden.

Other sites and heritage :

- At 1, rue Saint Julien, Domfront's oldest house, dated 1515 (MCXV).
- Cour Marie-du-Rocher, Located in the heart of the medieval town of Domfront, Cour Marie-du-Rocher links Rue Saint-Julien and Rue Docteur-Barrabé. Beautifully paved and fully restored, the Cour Marie-du-Rocher is one of those places you simply must visit. This passageway also leads to the former mansion of the Marie du Rocher family, probably built in the early 17th century, with molded window sills.
- Eleven towers still contribute to the town's medieval character, including the Tour d'Alençon, the gateway to the old town, and the numerous towers visible from the Rue des Fossés-Plisson on the south side of the old town
- The town hall, a beautiful 19th-century building, was built on the site of the former Saint-Antoine convent, opposite the Halle, known in the Middle Ages as the "cohue". This vast wooden building, surrounded by clerestories, housed the covered market. Much later, in 1855, the generosity of a Domfront resident, Mr. Pellier de la Roirie, enabled the present-day town hall and presbytery to be built. Grateful, the citizens decided to give his name to the former Place des Halles, which became Place Pellier-de-la-Roirie.
- The courthouse, built in 1839, a monumental building with thick stone columns.
- The former chapel of the Collège des Eudistes (now adjoining the Lycée Auguste Chevalier), blessed in 1732, now a lecture and performance hall.
- The old Bassin fountain, route de Flers, painted in the 19th century by Jules Noël.

== Notable people ==
- Rheinart d'Arfeuille (1840-1902) colonial administrator and explorer of French Indochina resided in Domfront in later years
- Claude Du Vall - notorious highwayman in England in the 17th century.
- Émile Deshayes de Marcère (1828–1918) - last surviving senator for life of the Third Republic was born here.

== See also ==
- Château de Domfront
- Communes of the Orne department
- Parc naturel régional Normandie-Maine
