= Dong Ampham National Biodiversity Conservation Area =

Protected area in Vietnam

- Dong Ampham National Protected Area
- IUCN category VI (protected area with sustainable use of natural resources)
- Location within Laos
- Location: Attapeu and Sekong provinces, Laos
- Coordinates: 15°6′27″N 107°25′28″E
- Area: 2,000 km^{2} (770 sq mi)
- Designation: National
- Designated: 1993
- Governing body: Department of Forestry (DOF), Ministry of Agriculture and Forestry (MAF)

Dong Ampham National Biodiversity Conservation Area is an extensive protected area which covers a significant part of Attapeu Province and Sekong Province in the southeast corner of Laos on the border with Vietnam. It covers the northeastern part of Attapeu Province and southeastern part of Sekong Province.

The heavily forested area, covering about 200,000 hectares, forms one of the National Biodiversity Conservation Areas of Laos. It was established on 29 October 1993.

== Geography ==
The park is on the western slope of the Annamite Range and is mostly hilly, rising to over 2,000 meters elevation in the northeastern portion of the park along the border with Vietnam. Rivers flowing through the park include Xe Kaman River and Xe Xou River, tributaries of the Mekong. The volcanic Nong Fa Lake is in the protected area.

== Flora and fauna ==
It contains "some of the last intact areas of lowland and tropical forests remaining in mainland Southeast Asia". Main plant communities include semi-evergreen forest and dry evergreen forest, with secondary vegetation in areas disturbed by shifting cultivation.

The wetlands are home to populations of Siamese crocodiles and Asian elephants, and large cats are known to inhabit the protected area. Large carnivores in the area include the sun bear (Helarctos malayanus), leopard cat (Panthera bengalensis), Asian golden cat (Catopuma temminickii), and clouded leopard (Neofelis nebulosa). It is also home to the threatened primates red-shanked douc (Pygathrix nemaeus) and yellow-cheeked gibbon (Nomascus gabriellae).

The protected area is home to several limited-range and threatened bird species, including the black-hooded laughingthrush (Garrulax milleti), great hornbill (Buceros bicornis), and Tickell's brown hornbill (Anorrhinus tickelli). It is designated an Important Bird Area.

== See also ==
- Protected areas of Laos
