= Nong Fa Lake =

Lake in Laos

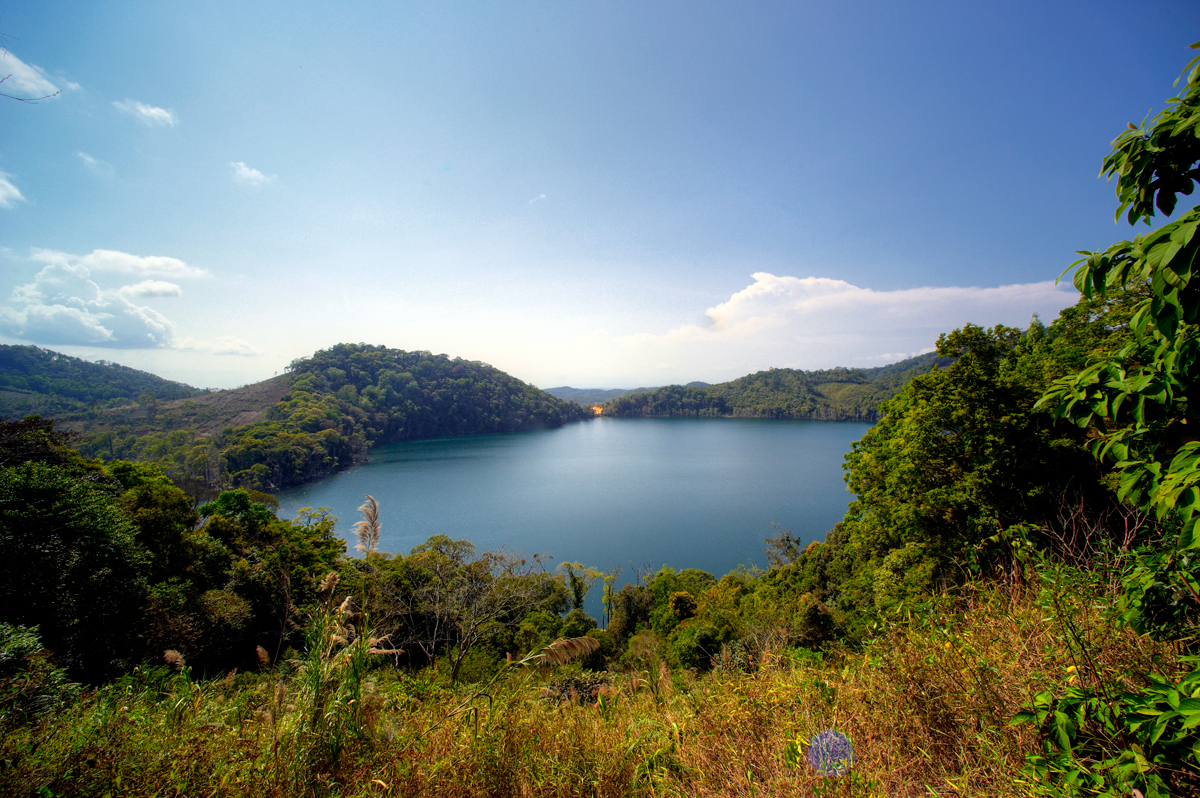
- 10 March 2012

- Location within Laos Location within Southeast Asia
- Location: Sanxay District, Attapeu Province, southeastern Laos
- Coordinates: 15°6′27″N 107°25′28″E

Nong Fa Lake or Nongphatom Lake ('Blue Lake') is a volcanic crater lake in the mountains of Sanxay District, Attapeu Province, southeastern Laos, in the Dong Ampham National Biodiversity Conservation Area, about 12 kilometres from the Vietnamese border. At an elevation of 1154 metres, the maximum depth of the lake is reportedly 78 metres, although locals have claimed that the depth is unknown, having attempted fruitlessly to gauge the depth with bamboo poles.

Lonely Planet describes it as "magical", a beautiful volcanic lake, similar to but larger than Yeak Lorn in Cambodia's Ratanakiri Province. During the Vietnam War it was used by the North Vietnamese as a rest stop for soldiers hurt on the Ho Chi Minh Trail. US pilots recorded it as a navigation point and called it "Dollar Lake" because of its round shape.

The lake is shrouded in legend, and Laotians refrain from bathing in it because they believe it is inhabited by a giant snake-pig who will devour bathers. The hill tribes in the area say that if you do swim in the waters you will have eternal youth.

== Bibliography ==
- Morris, Virginia, Huy, Le Do and Hills, Clive (2024). War Site Discoveries of Vietnam, Through rich personal experiences with those who fought, Thế Giới Publishers. ISBN 9786043923735
