= Ban Renthuk =

- Location in Laos
- Coordinates: 14°26′N 106°49′E
- Country: Laos
- Province: Attapeu Province
- Time zone: UTC+7 (ICT)

Ban Phialu Noy is a village in Phouvong District in Attapeu Province of southeastern Laos.
