= Phouvong district =

Phouvong district ເມືອງພູວົງ
- District
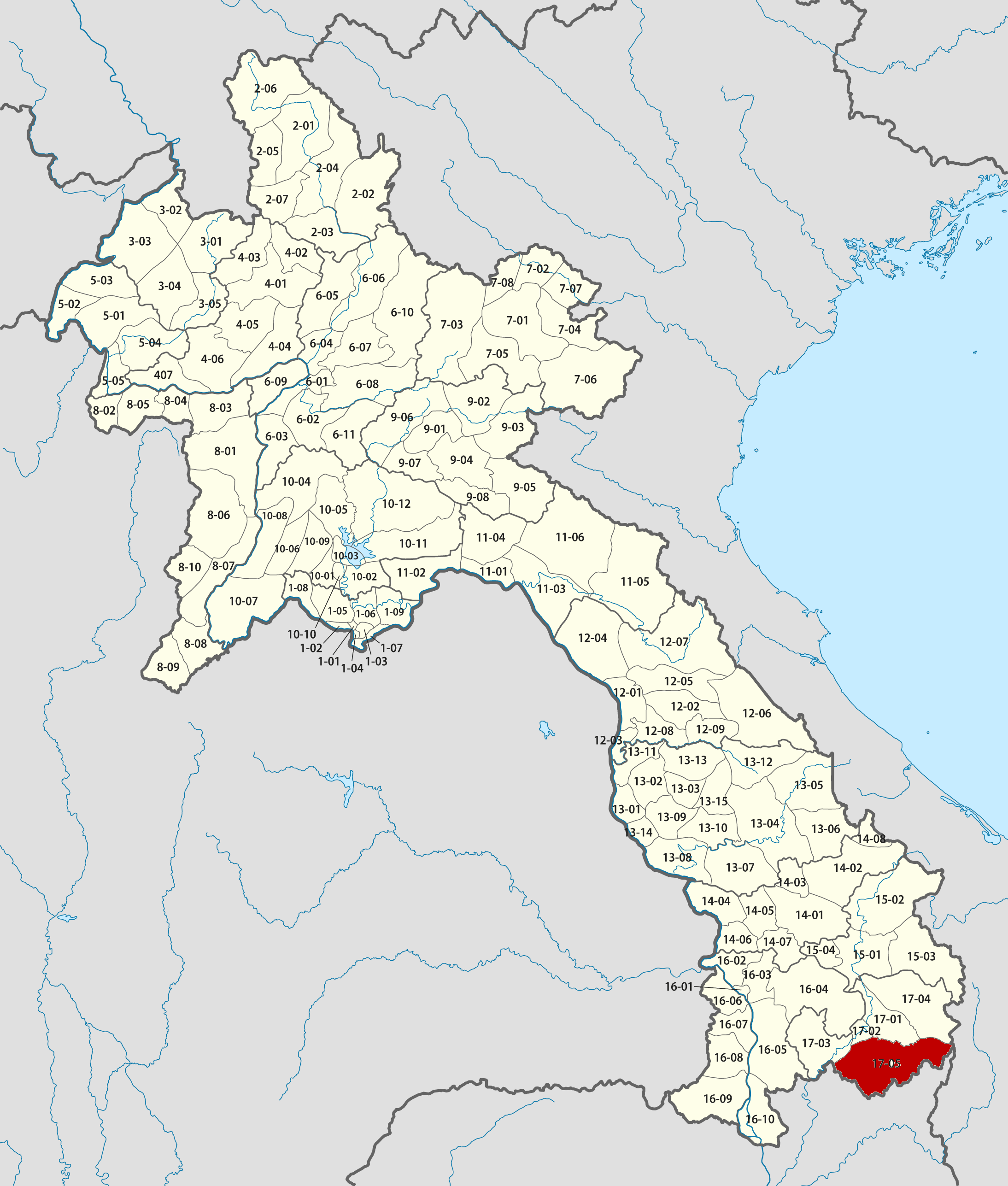
- Location in Laos
- Country: Laos
- Province: Attapeu province
- Time zone: UTC+7 (ICT)

Phouvong is a district (muang) of Attapeu province in southern Laos.

== Settlements ==
Ban Arapruich, Ban Chom, Ban Dak-Lay, Ban Ekchoum-Phoukaniang, Ban Gnangteu, Ban Khouy, Ban Kong-Ek, Ban Kongmi, Ban Lapoung, Ban Lomlay, Ban Namavong Noy, Ban Onglouang, Ban Pakha, Ban Phiadouang, Ban Phiaha, Ban Phiahom, Ban Phiakhamdaonang, Ban Phiakhamkak, Ban Phialu Gnai, Ban Phialu Noy, Ban Phianong, Ban Phiapang, Ban Phiaseuk, Ban Phiaviang, Ban Phokandong, Ban Phomoun, Ban Phomoun Gnai, Ban Renthuk, Ban Senchay, Ban Senkeo, Ban Senkhamphon, Ban Senlouang, Ban Tanong, Ban Thattamo, Ban Tong-Asa, Ban Vianglouang, Ban Vongxay, Ban Vongxay Noy
