= Saysetha district =

Saysetha district ເມືອງໄຊເຊດຖາ
- District
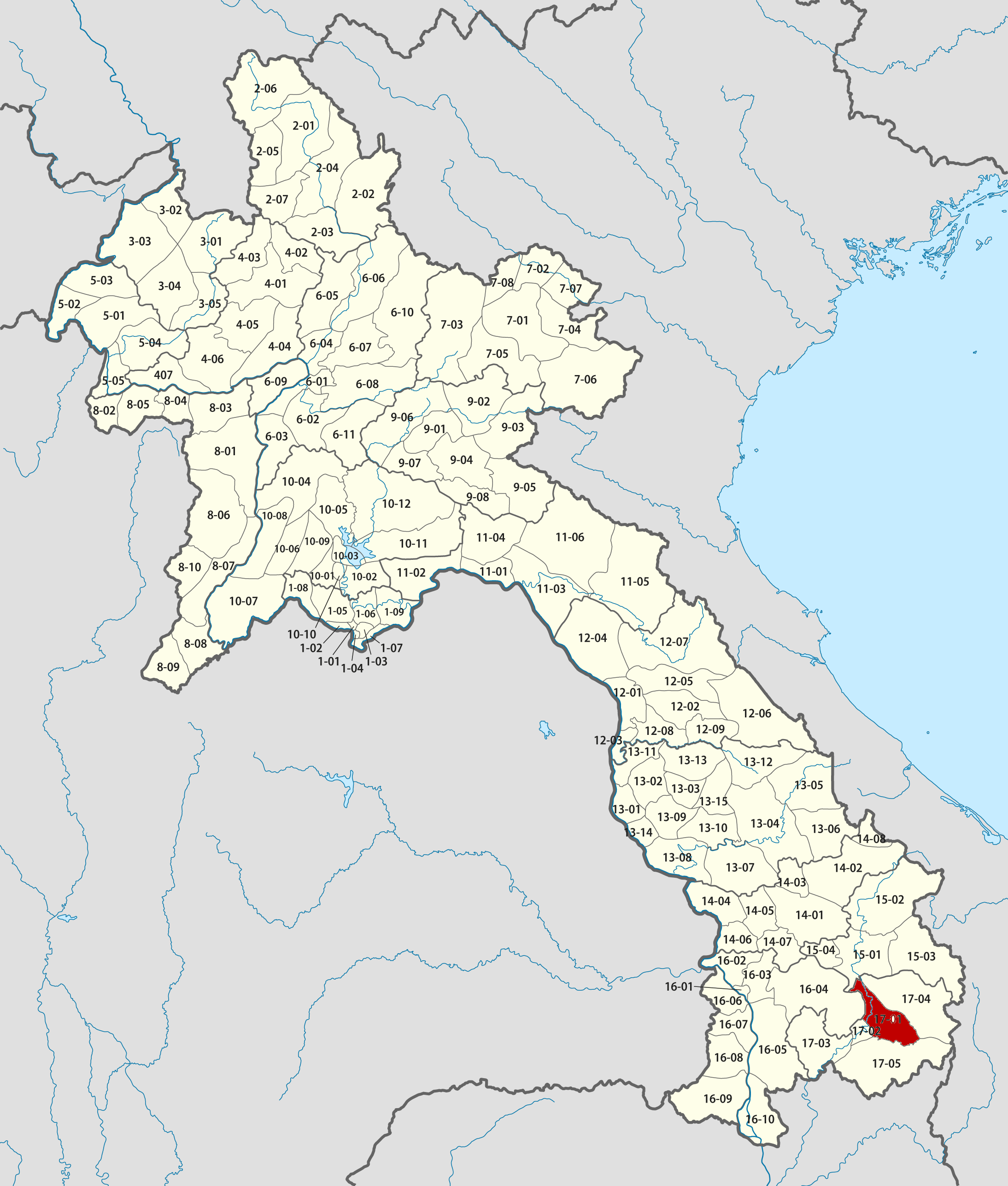
- Location in Laos
- Country: Laos
- Province: Attapeu province
- Time zone: UTC+7 (ICT)

Saysetha (or Xaysetha District) is a district (muang) of Attapu province in southern Laos.

== Settlements ==
- Xaysetha
