= Attapeu =

Capital of Attapeu province, Laos

Attapeu ອັດຕະປື
- District & municipality
- Samakkhixay District
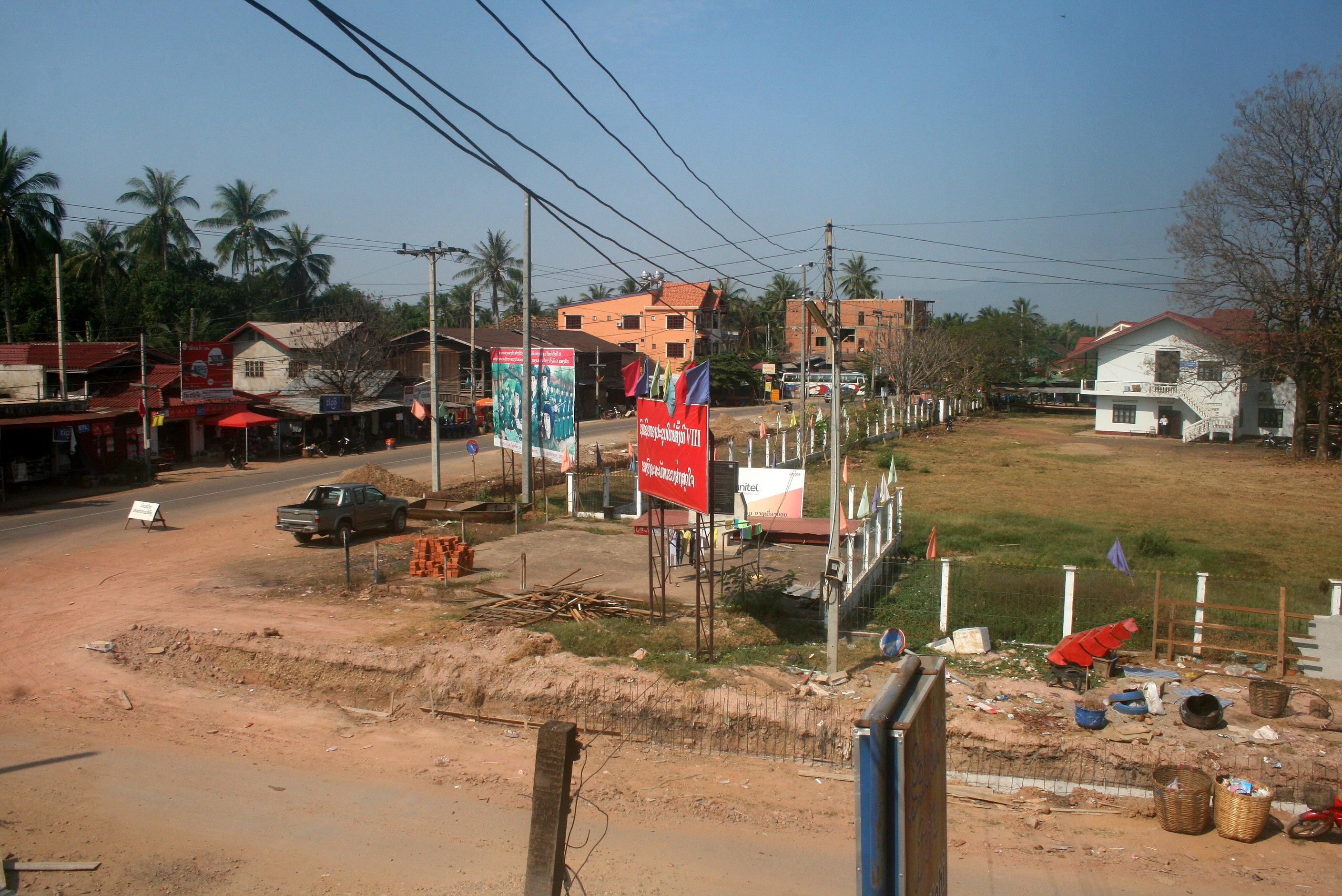

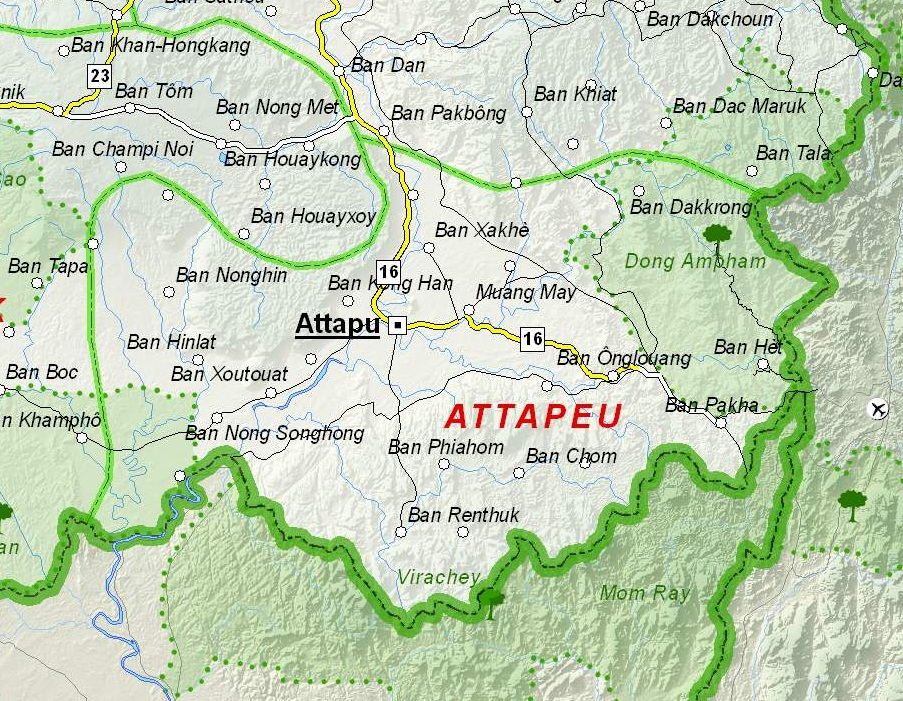
- Location in Attapeu Province

- Location in Laos
- Coordinates: 14°49′12″N 106°49′14″E
- Country: Laos
- Admin. division: Attapeu province
- Founded: 1560
- Elevation: 93 m (305 ft)

Population (2015)
  - Total: 33,700
  - Religions: Buddhism
- Time zone: UTC+7 (ICT)

Attapeu (Lao: ອັດຕະປື, pronounced [ʔát.tā.pɯ̀ː]), also written as Attopu or Attapu, officially, Muang Samakhi Xay, is a town in southern Laos, serving as the capital of Attapeu province. It is the southernmost of the capitals of provinces in Laos, about 75 kilometres (47 mi) by Route 11 south of Sekong.

The town is served by Attapeu International Airport, which is about 28 kilometres (17 mi) from Attapeu. The temple of Wat Luang Muang Mai was built in 1939.

== History ==
François Jules Harmand visited Attapeu in 1877 and reported about the extremely unhealthy conditions in the town, which was one of the worst affected areas in the country with malaria. Another French visitor to the town during this period was Rheinart d'Arfeuille, an explorer of the Mekong.

At the start of the French occupation of Laos, slavery was still prevalent in Attapeu. According to Ian G. Baird, the "most important dignitaries in Attapeu possessed the most enslaved people".

== Geography and climate ==
Attapeu is situated in far southern Laos on the Xekong River, about 75 kilometres (47 mi) south of Sekong, along Route 11. Xayden is 105 kilometres (65 mi) by road to the southeast, approaching the border with Vietnam. The Tat Sae Pha falls, of about 20 metres (66 ft) are roughly 40 kilometres (25 mi) from Attapeu.

Climate data for Attapeu (1990–2019)
Month	Jan	Feb	Mar	Apr	May	Jun	Jul	Aug	Sep	Oct	Nov	Dec	Year
Mean daily maximum °C (°F)	32.5 (90.5)	34.2 (93.6)	35.9 (96.6)	36.3 (97.3)	34.3 (93.7)	32.3 (90.1)	31.2 (88.2)	31.1 (88.0)	31.5 (88.7)	32.1 (89.8)	32.3 (90.1)	31.7 (89.1)	33.0 (91.3)
Daily mean °C (°F)	25.6 (78.1)	27.4 (81.3)	29.7 (85.5)	30.7 (87.3)	29.7 (85.5)	28.5 (83.3)	27.7 (81.9)	27.6 (81.7)	27.7 (81.9)	27.6 (81.7)	27.1 (80.8)	25.9 (78.6)	27.9 (82.3)
Mean daily minimum °C (°F)	18.7 (65.7)	20.6 (69.1)	23.4 (74.1)	25.0 (77.0)	25.0 (77.0)	24.7 (76.5)	24.2 (75.6)	24.0 (75.2)	23.9 (75.0)	23.0 (73.4)	21.9 (71.4)	20.0 (68.0)	22.9 (73.2)
Average precipitation mm (inches)	3 (0.1)	14 (0.6)	34 (1.3)	86 (3.4)	232 (9.1)	342 (13.5)	463 (18.2)	469 (18.5)	373 (14.7)	133 (5.2)	25 (1.0)	6 (0.2)	2,180 (85.8)
Average relative humidity (%)	61.1	57.4	58.3	59.1	70.4	76.0	80.1	81.9	79.3	74.9	67.4	62.0	69.0
Source 1: Food and Agriculture Organization of the United Nations
Source 2: SeaDelt (humidity 2016–2022)

== Economy ==
The Lao government awarded the Vietnamese company Quang Minh the first contract for rubber plantations in Attapeu province, and rubber processing took off in the late 2000s. The town of Attapeu is a centre for rubber processing, with a plant in the town processing over 10,000 tons per year, from rubber plantations in the area covering over 7000 hectares.

== Landmarks ==
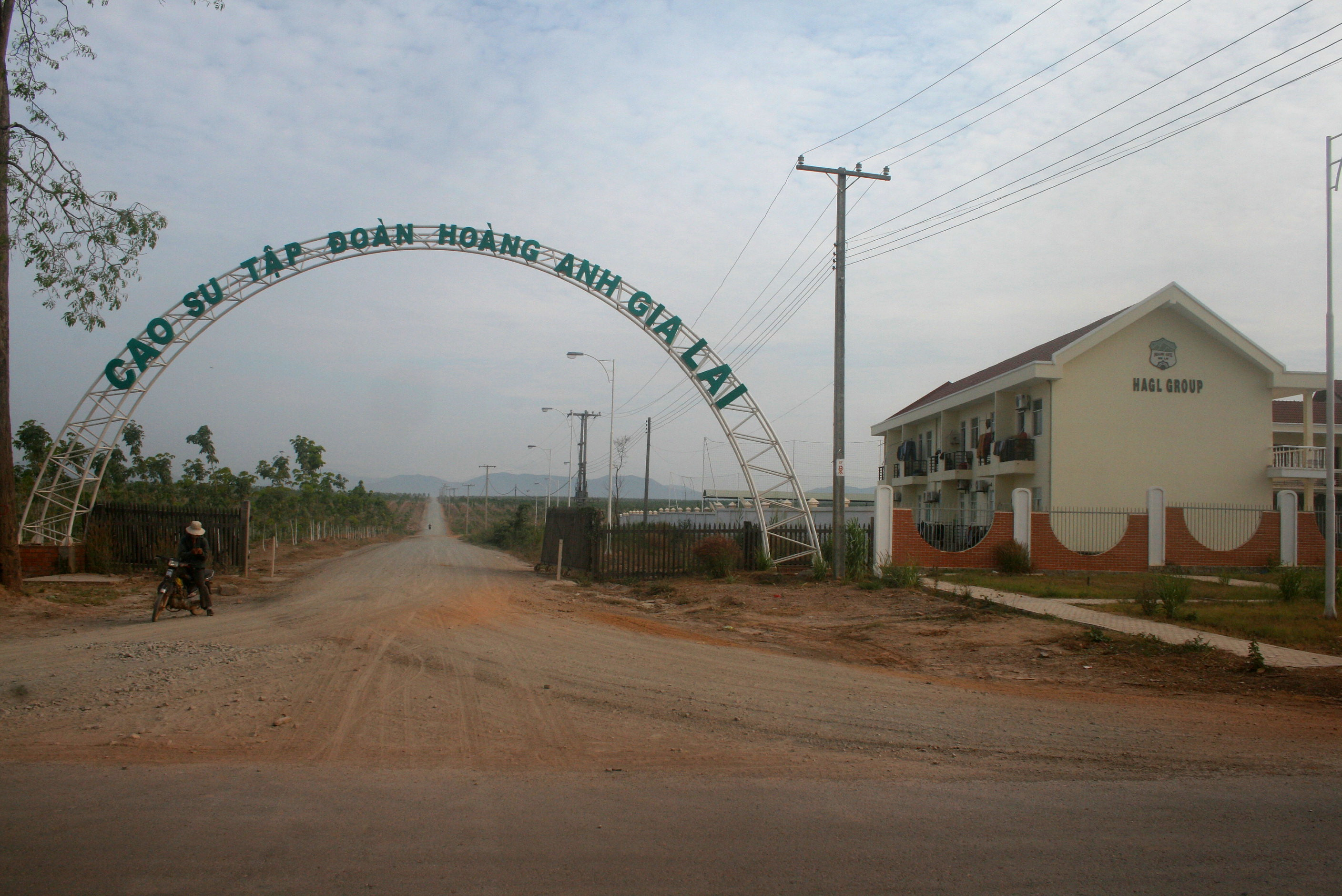
HAGL Rubber Plantation in Attapeu

The temple of Wat Luang Muang Mai in the town centre was built in 1939 and is notable for original naga barge boards. Attapeu Provincial Museum, situated on Samakhy Road contains rice husking machinery, weapons, models of tribal houses and photos of notables from the area.

As of 2010, the town had one branch of the Lao Development Bank in the town centre. There is a Vietnamese run restaurant, Thi Thi. The Dethphachanh Hotel opened in September 2022, a two-storey hotel with 34 rooms.

== Transport ==
Route 11 connects the town to the Vietnamese border in the southeast, where the road joins the QL40 road in Vietnam.

Attapeu International Airport is about 28 kilometres (17 mi) from Attapeu. The airport opened in May 2015 but did not receive flights until April 2016, when Lao Airlines introduced flights from Vientiane via Pakse. The airline withdrew from the market in October 2016 due to low demand. TTR Weekly attributed the airport's condition to the lack of nearby tourist attractions, even though commercial activity has risen due to Attapeu's proximity to Vietnam.

== See also ==
- Kingdom of Champasak
