= Xe Kaman River =

River in Laos

Coordinates: 15.0900°N 107.2494°E

The Xe Kaman River is a river in southeastern Laos. It flows through the Dong Ampham National Biodiversity Conservation Area of Attapeu province. The river is known to have populations of dolphins. The area is being destroyed by a dam being built on the river. The village of Ban Hin Dam lies on the river and is where boat trips are launched.
