= Nam Pakan =

River in Laos

Coordinates: 17°39′N 104°37′E

Nam Pakan is a river of Laos. It flows through Khammouane Province and Savannakhet Province.
