= Xe Xou River =

River in Laos

Coordinates: 14.746°N 107.265°E

Xe Xou River is a river in southeastern Laos. It flows through the Dong Ampham National Biodiversity Conservation Area of Attapeu Province. The village of Ban Keng Maw lies on the river and is where boat trips are launched.
