= Attapeu province =

Province of Laos

Attapeu province ແຂວງ ອັດຕະປື
- Province
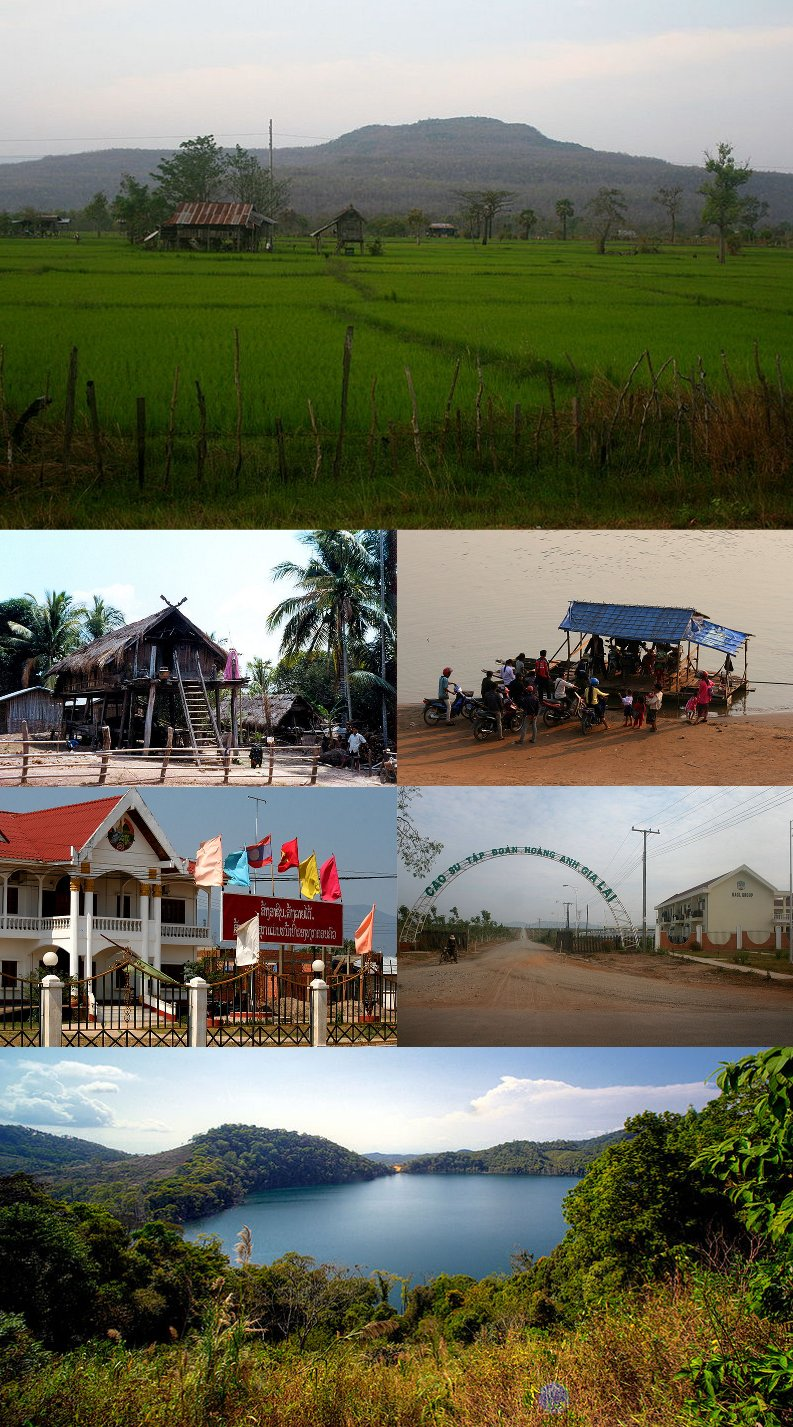

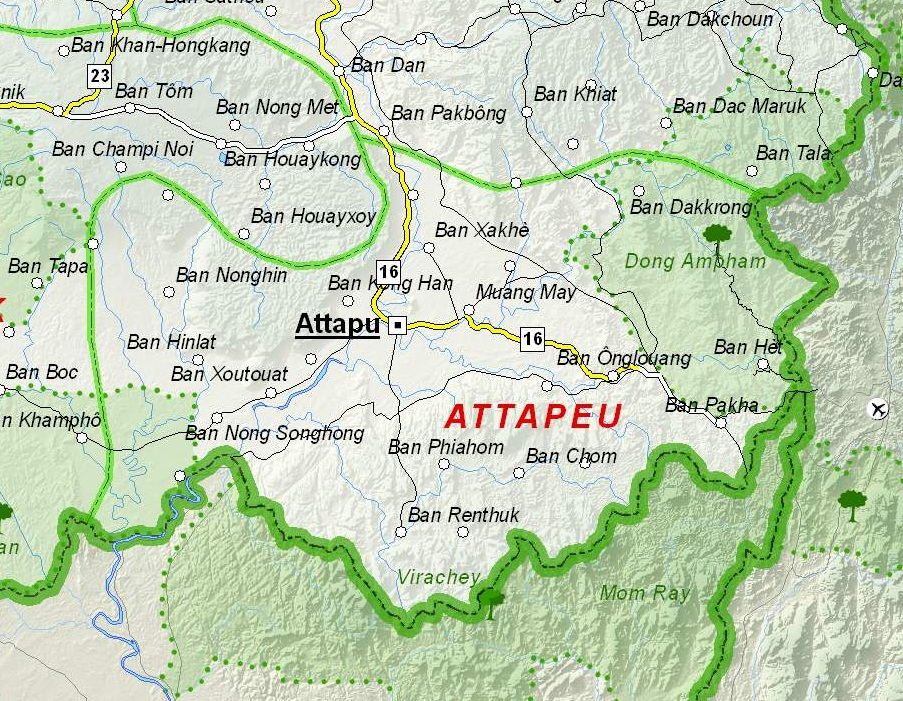
- Map of Attapeu province

- Location of Attapeu province in Laos
- Coordinates: 14.8°N 106.833°E
- Country: Laos
- Capital: Attapeu

Area
  - Total: 10,320 km^{2} (3,980 sq mi)

Population (2020)
  - Total: 159,885
  - Density: 15.49/km^{2} (40.13/sq mi)
- Time zone: UTC+7 (ICT)
- ISO 3166 code: LA-AT
- HDI (2022): 0.597 medium · 10th

Attapeu (Lao: ອັດຕະປື, pronounced [ʔát.tā.pɯ̀ː]) is a province of Laos in the southeast of the country. It has five districts: Phouvong, Sanamxay, Sanxay, Saysetha and Samakkixay, covering an area of 10,320 square kilometres (3,980 sq mi) with an estimated population of 159,885 in 2020. The provincial capital is Attapeu.

Following national liberation, the province became known as the "land of heroism". The province has a national park, Xe Pian National Park, and a national biodiversity conservation area, Dong Ampham National Biodiversity Conservation Area.

== Geography ==
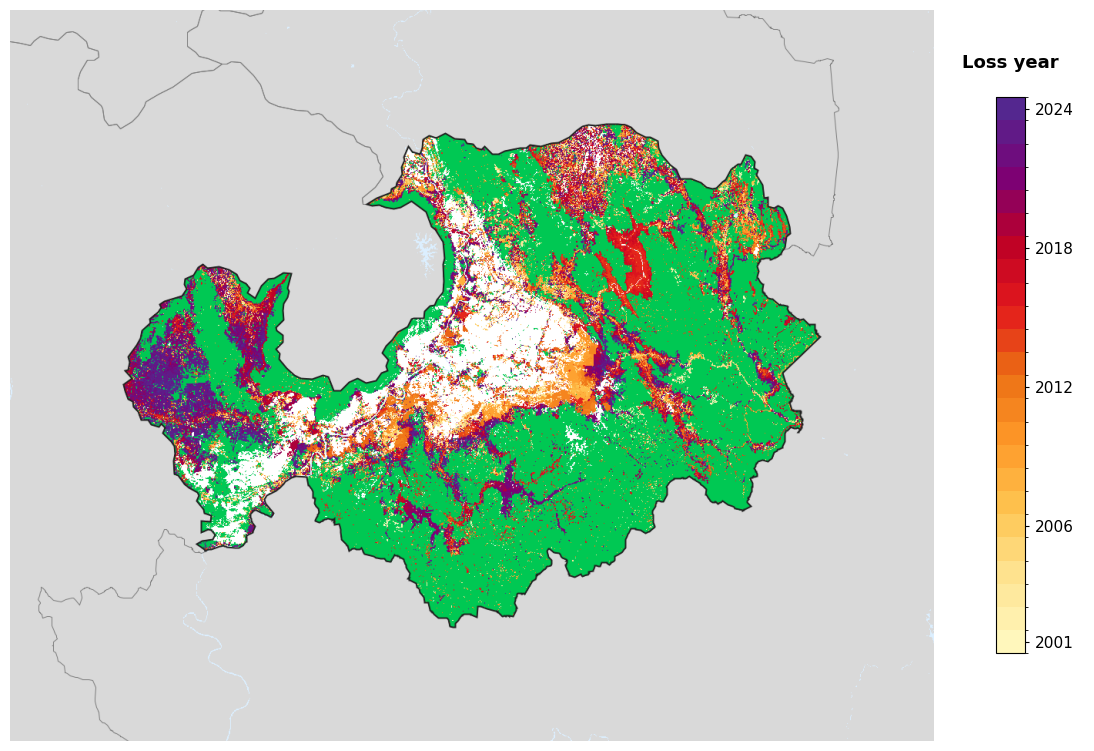
Tree-cover loss year in Attapeu, 2001-2024, from the Global Forest Change dataset.

Attapeu province covers an area of 10,320 square kilometres (3,980 sq mi). It borders Sekong province to the north, Vietnam (Kom Tum) to the east, Virachey National Park of Cambodia (Ratanakiri and Stung Treng) to the south, and Champasak province to the west. Settlements in the province include Attapeu, Ban Nonghin, Ban Xoutouat, Ban Nong Songhong, Ban Renthuk, Ban Phiahom, Ban Choim, Ban Pakha, Ban Onglouang, Ban Het, Muang May, Ban kong Han, Ban Xakhe, and Ban Dakkrong.

The landscape of the province consists of thick forest, rivers and streams and plains areas in the backdrop of mountains such as Phou Saphong and Phou Luang. The principal rivers are the Xe Kong, Xe Kaman, and the Xe Xou River and the province is “difficult to traverse” in the rainy season. The province has waterfalls of note. These include the 23 m high, 120 m wide Tad Saephe Waterfall in Xepaine Forest, the 10 m high, 30 m wide Tad Samongphak Waterfall between Houay Samong and Xepaine River, Tad Phok Waterfall, and Tad Phaphong Waterfall, running from Xe Xou River. During the American War in Vietnam, parts of the Ho Chi Minh Trail passed through the province. The main roads are Route 13, and Route 11.

=== Protected areas ===
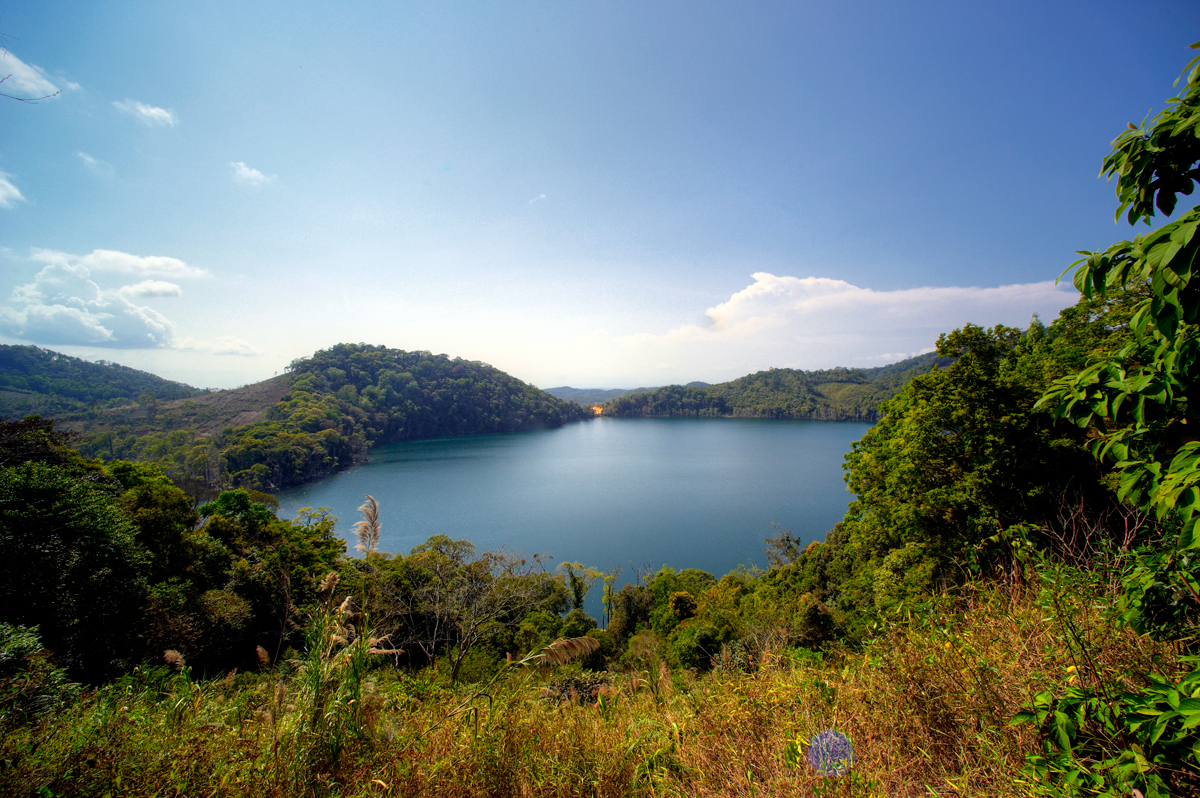
Nong Fa Lake

Dong Ampham National Biodiversity Conservation Area (NBCA) lies partly in Attapeu province (for the northeastern part) and Sekong province (for the southeastern part), on the border with Vietnam. The NBCA is forested and covers about 200,000 hectares. Established in 1993, it is one of the 23 National Biodiversity Conservation Areas of Laos. Dong Ampham is home to "some of the last intact areas of lowland and tropical forests remaining in mainland Southeast Asia." Topographical features include the Xe Kaman and Xe Xou Rivers, and the volcanic lake Nong Fa Lake. Tigers and Clouded leopard have been recorded here.

The 71,400 hectare Attapu Plain is an Important Bird Area (IBA) adjacent to the NBCA. It is at an elevation of 200–400 metres (660–1,310 ft). The landscape includes wetlands, such as those of the Xe Khaman and Xe Xou rivers, and freshwater lakes and pools. There are dry forests and dry deciduous forests, as well as shingle and stony beaches. Bird life includes the lesser fish eagle (Ichthyophaga humilis), red-headed vulture (Sarcogyps calvus), and white-rumped vulture (Gyps bengalensis).

=== Administrative divisions ===
The province is composed of the following five districts:

Map	Code	Name	Romanization	Lao script	Area in km^{2}	Pop'n 2015 Census
	17-01	Saysetha District	Mueang Saisathan	ເມືອງໄຊສະຖານ	1,296	34,235
	17-02	Samakkhixay District	Mueang Samakkhisai	ເມືອງສະໝັກຄີໄຊ	492	37,208
	17-03	Sanamxay District	Mueang Sanamsai	ເມືອງສະໜາມໄຊ	2,217	35,007
	17-04	Sanxay District	Mueang Sansai	ເມືອງສານໄຊ	2,841	22,795
	17-05	Phouvong District	Mueang Phuwong	ເມືອງພູວົງ	3,391	14,706

== History ==
The province was part of the Lane Xang Kingdom during the reign of King Saysethathirath. Earlier to this it was a habitat of wild buffaloes known as "Idkabue" (meaning, 'buffalo dropping'), which, in the French colonial regime, became "Attapeu". During the revolutionary war against the French, the province was the headquarters of the National Liberation Front, the pro-Royalist militia group led by General Vang Pao. By the end of the Laotian Civil War, some of the area was destroyed, remnants of which can be seen in some stretches of the Ho Chi Minh Road.

== Demographics ==
The province's population was 139,628 at the 2015 Census and was reported to be 167,000 as at mid 2023. It consists of 15 major ethnic communities in the province which include Lao, Alak, Katang, Kaleum, Katou, Suay, Oy, Taoy, Sadang, Nge, Lavea, Lavenh, Cheuang, Tariang and Nyaheung groups.

== Economy ==
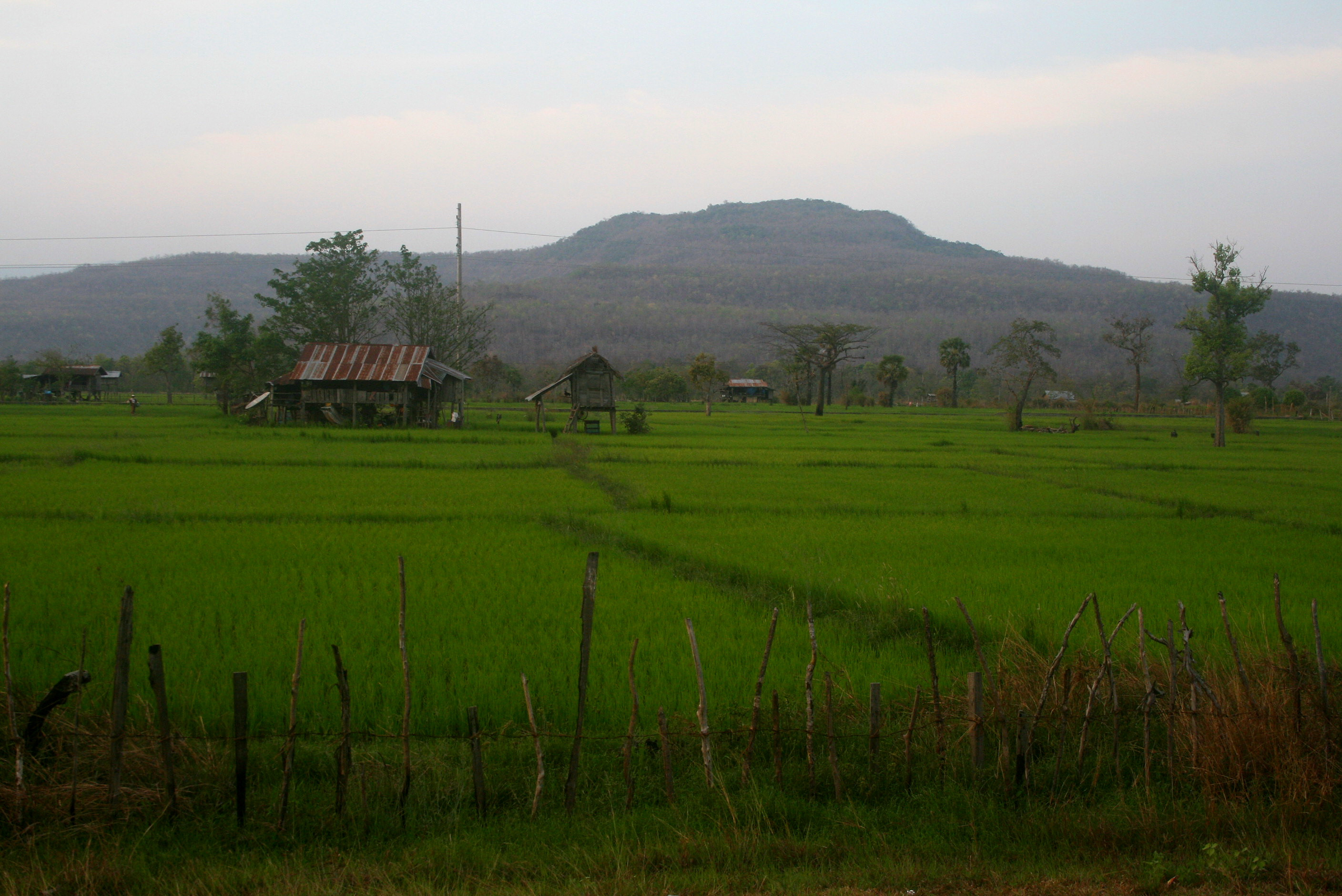
Rice fields

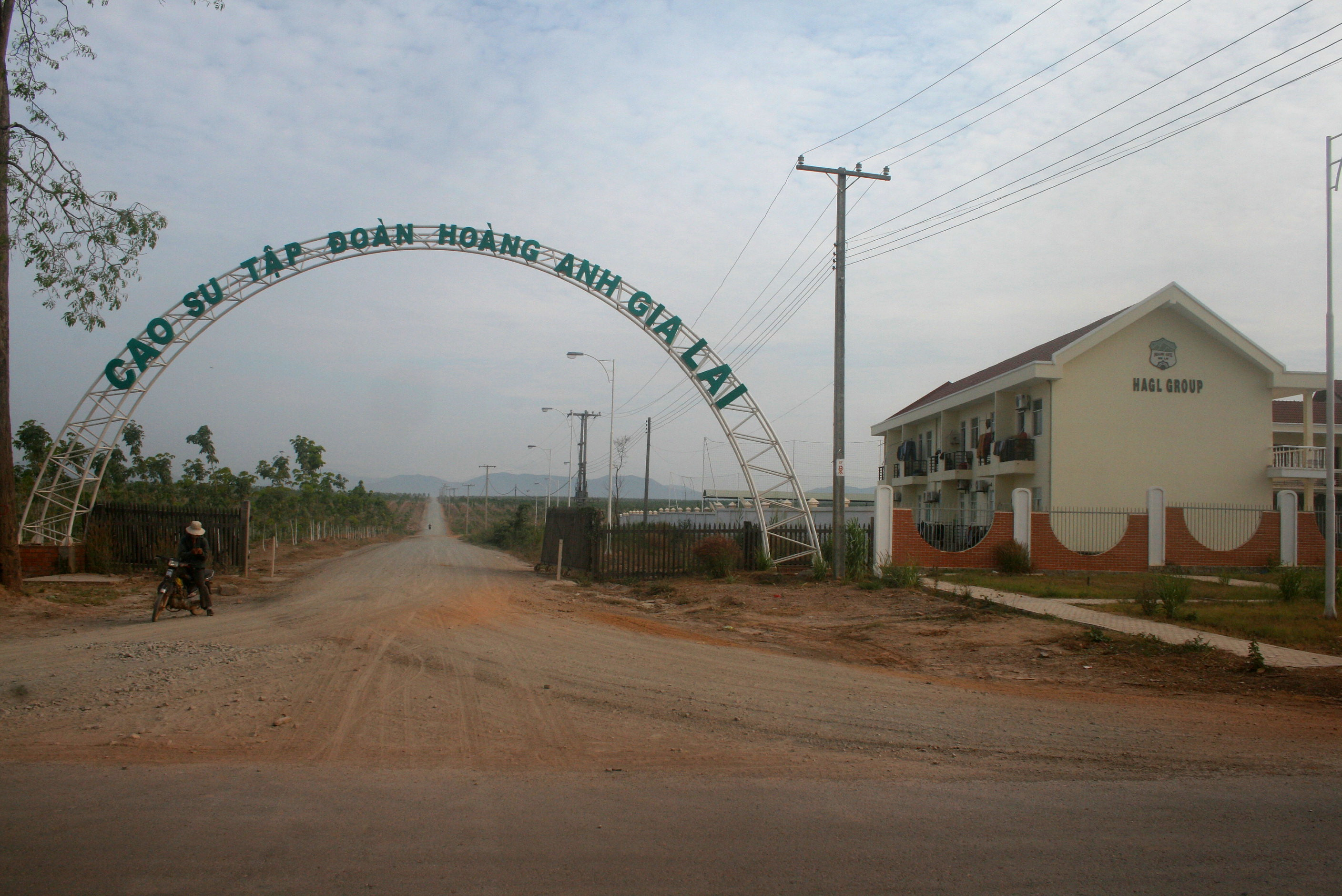
HAGL rubber plantation on the road to Vietnam

The listed globally threatened wild life species number 14 (according to the World Conservation Union (IUCN Red List and 23 species according to the CITES. In the rural economy Laos (80% of rural households), the dependency on forest resources is concentrated in the fields of wild animals and plants, exchanged and extracted for achieving sustainable income; fish is an aquatic vertebrate exploited, apart from other terrestrial and aquatic vertebrates.

Given its proximity to Vietnam, the province has traditionally been a source for raw materials and forest products for adjacent regions in Vietnam. Forest products exported by Champa through its seaports were sourced from places as far as Attapeu.

Some Vietnamese companies expanded into Attapeu province. Hoang Anh Gia Lai Group has acquired rights to grow rubber trees in the province. The company plans to invest in electricity generation, sugar refining, and organic fertilizer production. Construction of a US$100 million sugar project including industrial facilities started in November 2011.

== Landmarks ==
Some of the locations in the province are the Wat Sakae Temple which has a Buddha image and is visited during the Lao New Year, and a pagoda and Xaysetha Stupa in Xaysetha District, built in 1579. The temple of Wat Luang Muang Mai in the capital city of Attapeu was built in 1939 and is known for original naga barge boards. King Setthathirat of the Lan Xang is buried in a stupa at the temple of Wat Pha Saysettha in Pha Meuang, approximately 15 kilometres (9.3 mi) from the capital city. The Sihanouk Trail branches from the Ho Chi Minh Trail at Phu Vong, 13 kilometres (8.1 mi) from the capital.

== Villages ==
- Xaisi

== Gallery ==
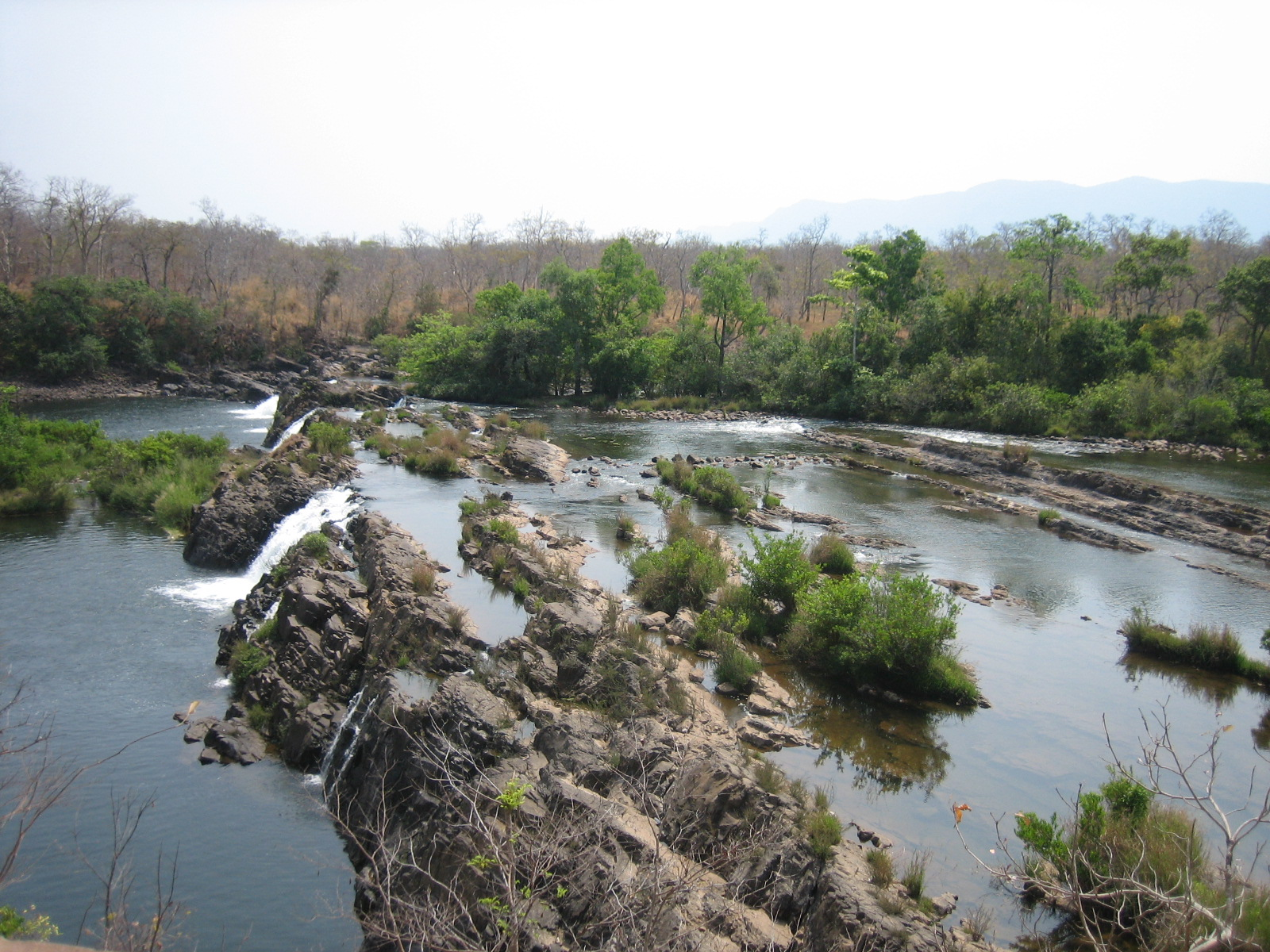
Xekong province: Tad Feak Falls, just across the border from Attapeu

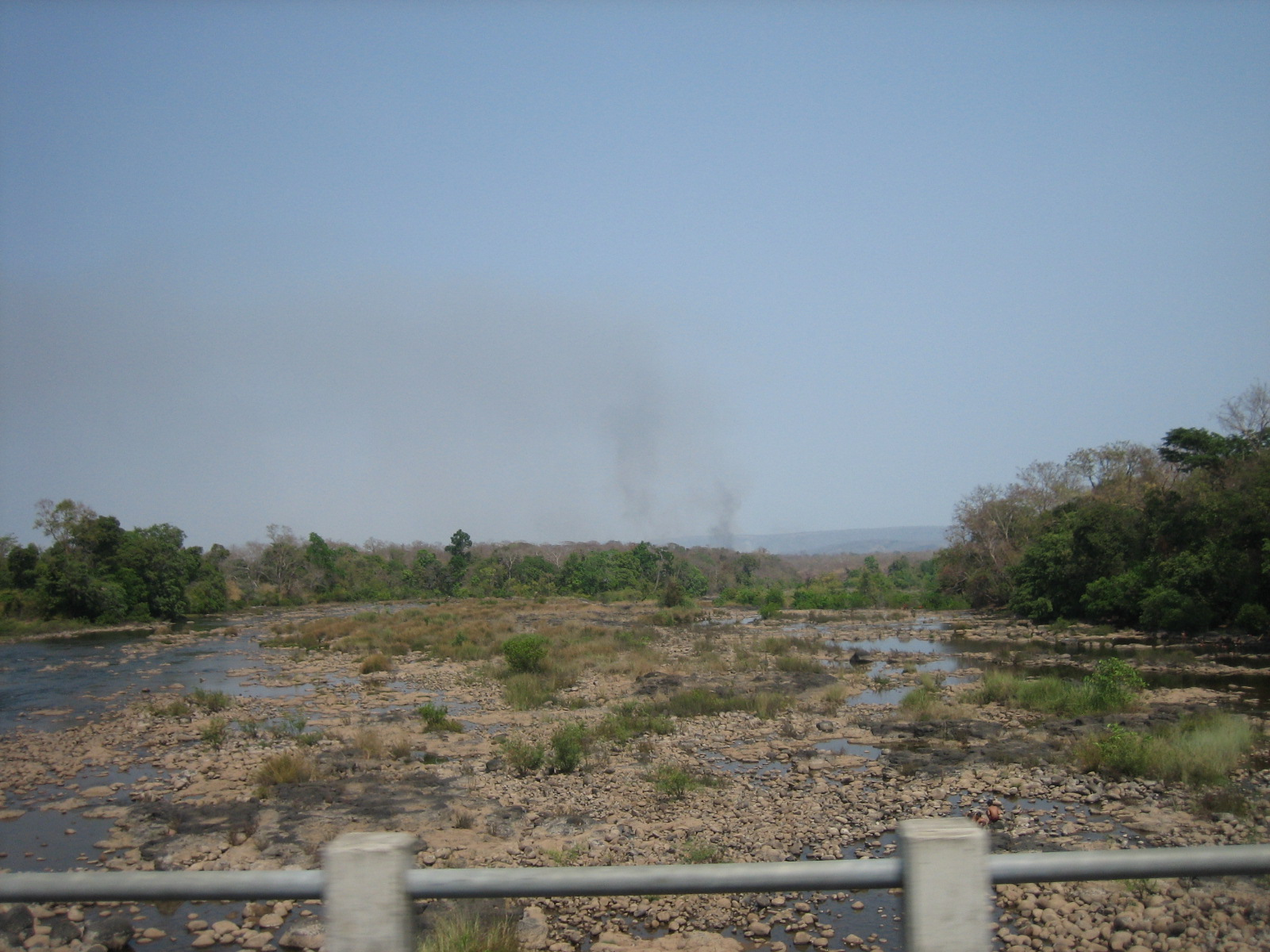
Forested area, Attapeu province

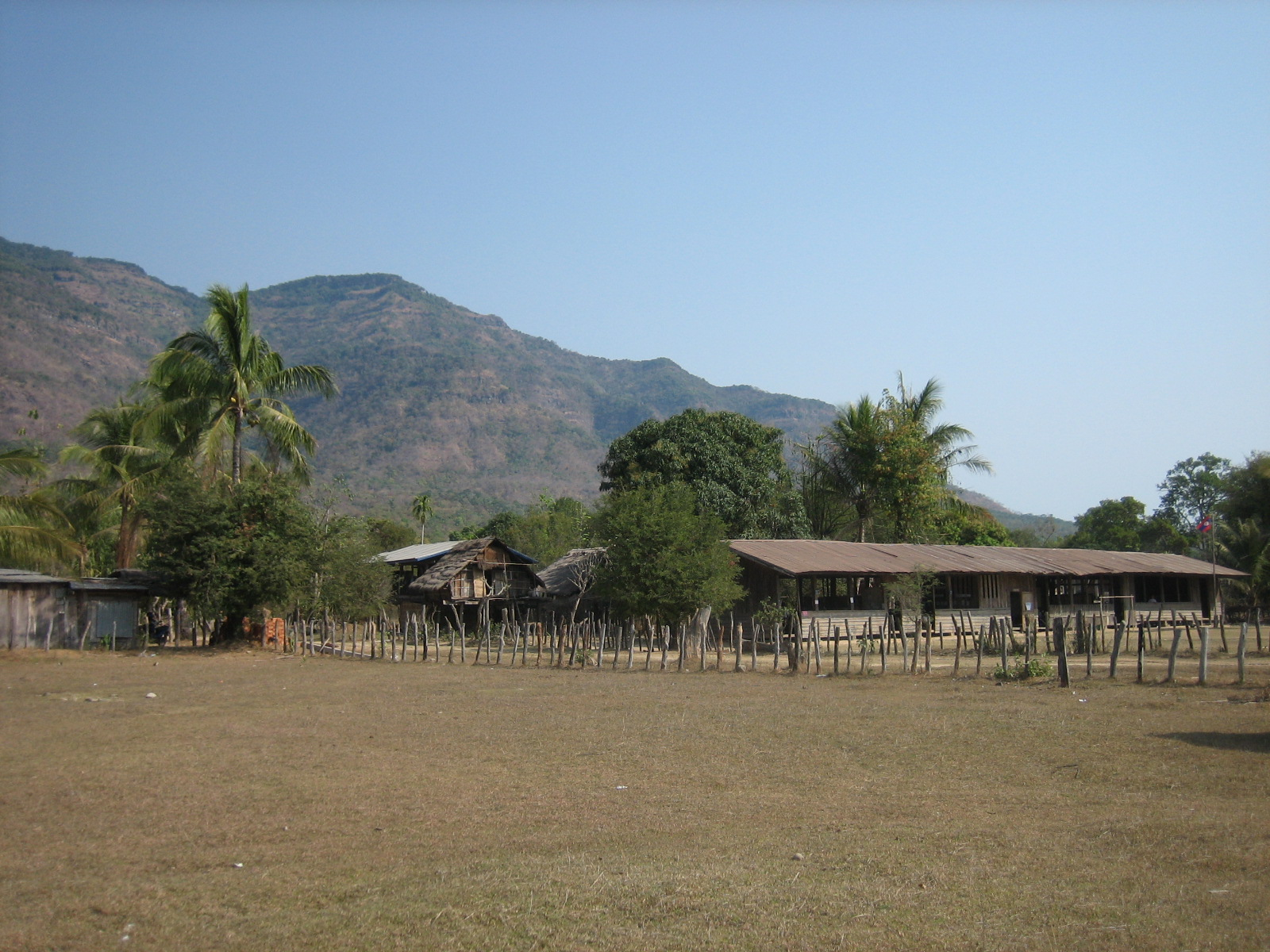
Attapeu village
