= List of companies of Laos =

Location of Laos

Laos is a landlocked country in the heart of the Indochinese peninsula of Mainland Southeast Asia, bordered by Myanmar (Burma) and China to the northwest, Vietnam to the east, Cambodia to the southwest, and Thailand to the west and southwest.

Laos' ambitious strategies for development are based on generating electricity from its rivers and selling the power to its neighbors, namely Thailand, China, and Vietnam, as well as its initiative to become a 'land-linked' nation, shown by the planning of four new railways connecting Laos to those same countries. This, along with growth of the mining sector, Laos has been referred to as one of East Asia and Pacific's fastest growing economies by the World Bank, with annual GDP growth averaging 7% for the past decade.

It is a member of the Asia-Pacific Trade Agreement (APTA), Association of Southeast Asian Nations (ASEAN), East Asia Summit and La Francophonie. Laos applied for membership of the World Trade Organization (WTO) in 1997; on 2 February 2013, it was granted full membership.

== Notable firms ==
This list includes notable companies with primary headquarters located in the country. The industry and sector follow the Industry Classification Benchmark taxonomy. Organizations which have ceased operations are included and noted as defunct.

Notable companies Status: P=Private, S=State; A=Active, D=Defunct
| Name | Industry | Sector | Headquarters | Founded | Notes | Status | |
|---|---|---|---|---|---|---|---|
| Boun Oum Airways | Consumer services | Travel & leisure | ? | 1964 | Aviation, defunct 1967 | P | D |
| Electricite du Laos | Utilities | Electricity | Vientiane | 1959 | Electric utility | P | A |
| Lao Airlines | Consumer services | Travel & leisure | Vientiane | 1976 | Aviation | S | A |
| Lao Brewery Company | Consumer goods | Food & beverage | Vientiane | 1971 | Beverage | P | A |
| Lao Central Airlines | Consumer services | Travel & leisure | Vientiane | 2010 | Aviation, defunct 2014 | P | D |
| Lao Holding State Enterprise | Utilities | Electricity | Vientiane | 2005 | Electric utility | S | A |
| Lao Skyway | Consumer services | Travel & leisure | Vientiane | 2002 | Aviation | P | A |
| Nam Theun 2 Power Company | Utilities | Electricity | ? | ? | Electric utility | P | A |

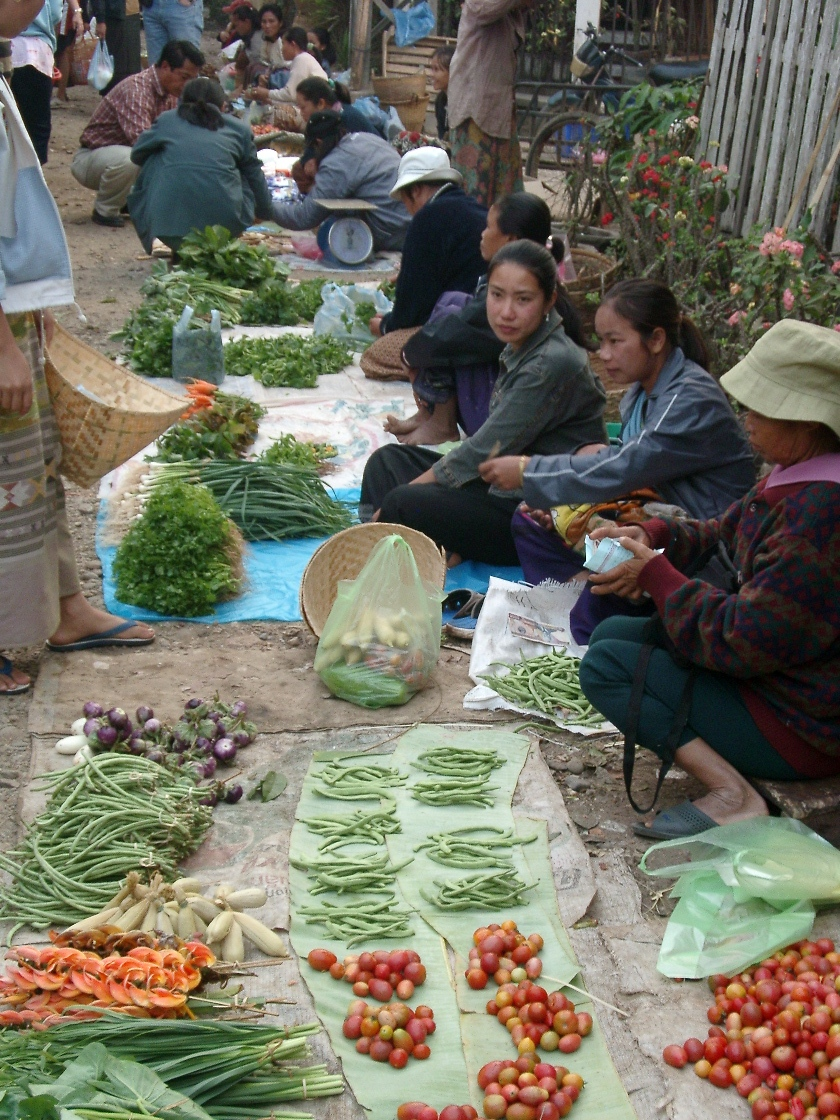
A market in Luang Prabang.

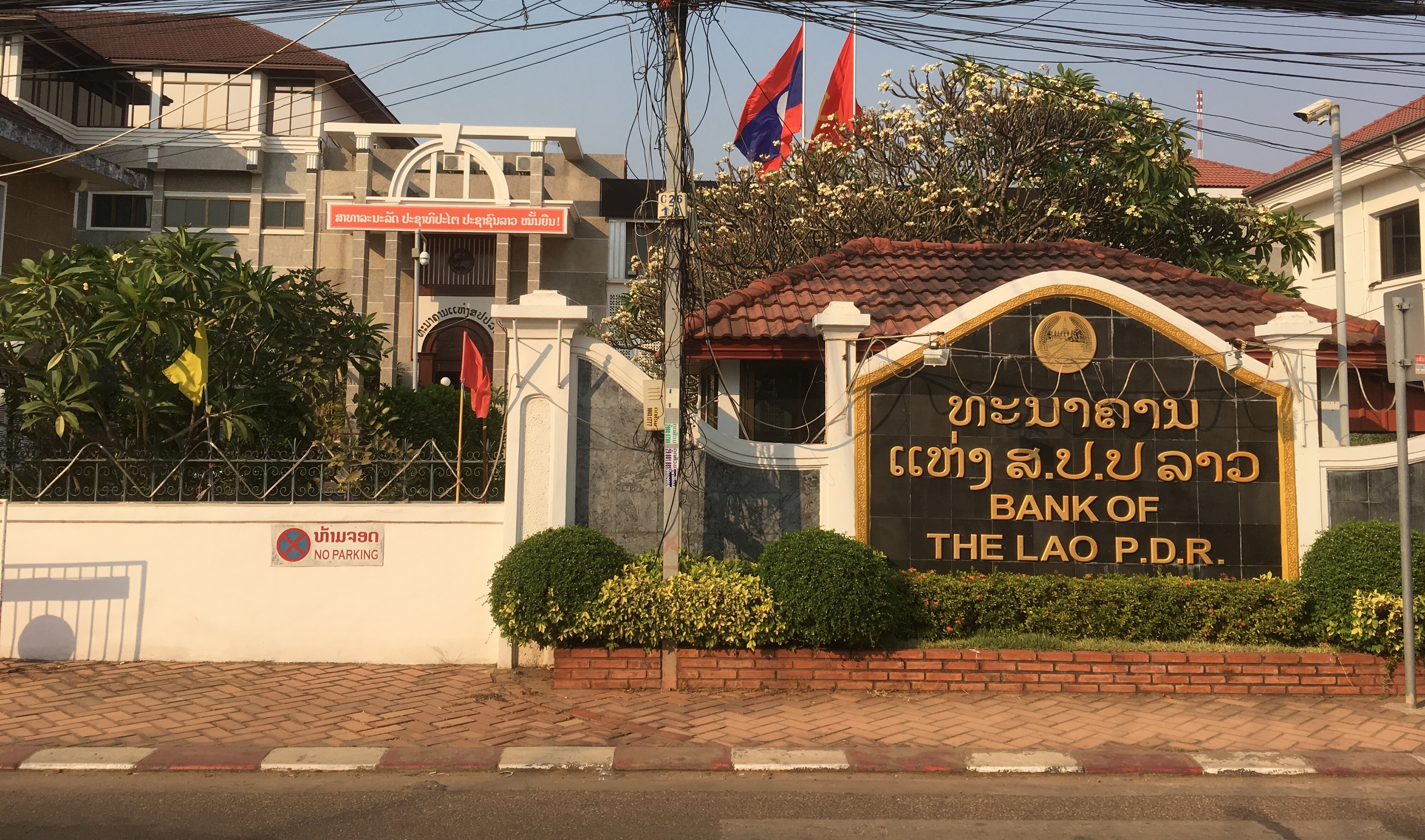
Bank of the Lao P.D.R., central bank.

Lao Securities Exchange.

== See also ==
- Economy of Laos
- List of airlines of Laos
- List of banks in Laos
