= List of power stations in Laos =

Electricity generation in Laos is produced by one coal-fired power plant and several hydroelectric dams. 53% of power generated in 2016 came from renewable sources. The majority of power produced from the Hongsa plant is exported to Thailand. The Xayaburi run-of-river dam is expected to generate over 7,000 GWh of electricity per year, which will mainly be exported to Thailand as part of the development of an interconnected Southeast Asian energy market.

== Thermal ==
Power plant	Fuel	Capacity (MW)	Units	Year completed
Hongsa	Lignite	1878	3 x 626 MW	2015

== Hydroelectric ==
Table 1: Existing Lao hydropower stations (15 MW installed capacity and above).

Plant name	River	River basin	Location	COD	Installed capacity (MW)	Mean annual energy (GWh)	Height (m)	Crest length (m)	Total storage (m^{3})	Max reservoir area (km^{2})
Don Sahong	Mekong	Mekong	13.956223°N 105.964247°E	2020	240	2,000	25	6,800	25	2.2
Houay Ho	Houayho/Xekong	Mekong	15.059464°N 106.764377°E	1999	152	450	79		3,530	37
Houay La Nge	Houay La-Nge	Mekong	15.774865°N 107.054896°E	2023	60	290	58	179	14	93.6
Houay Lamphan Gnai	Xekong	Mekong	15.356495°N 106.498949°E	2015	84.8	480	77	74.5	140	9
Houay Por	Houay Por	Mekong	15.545605°N 106.256763°E	2018	15	75	6		0.76	
Lower Houay Lam Phanh	Houay Lamphan	Mekong	15.321515°N 106.630123°E	2022	15	68	55	523	73.9	
Nam Ao	Nam Ao	Mekong	19.160876°N 103.283107°E	2023	15	92	26	130	52	4.9
Nam Beng	Nam Beng	Mekong	19.946436°N 101.237563°E	2014	36	145	25.5	84.8	3,611	0.7
Nam Che 1	Nam Che	Mekong	19.054645°N 103.513536°E	2019	16.8		23	50		
Nam Chien 1	Nam Che	Mekong	19.145395°N 103.557259°E	2018	104	448.2	68.8	367	14	
Nam Houng 1	Nam Houng	Mekong	19.189914°N 101.806322°E	2023	15	57				1.52
Nam Khan 2	Nam Khan	Mekong	19.685364°N 102.369791°E	2015	130	558	160	405		30.5
Nam Khan 3	Nam Khan	Mekong	19.747016°N 102.222793°E	2016	88	480	77	74.5	140	9
Nam Kong 1	Nam Kong	Mekong	14.546513°N 106.740933°E	2021	160	649	87	386	679	21.8
Nam Kong 2	Nam Kong	Mekong	14.494672°N 106.856669°E	2018	66	264	50	210	71.4	4.2
Nam Kong 3	Nam Kong	Mekong	14.566338°N 106.912551°E	2021	54	204	65	500	471	32
Nam Leuk	Nam Leuk/Nam Ngum	Mekong	18.437406°N 102.94675°E	2000	60	215	51.5	800	185	17.2
Nam Lik 1	Nam Lik	Mekong	18.619438°N 102.387252°E	2019	64	256	36.5	72		22.3
Nam Lik 1-2	Nam Lik	Mekong	18.793782°N 102.116714°E	2010	100	435	103	328	11	24.4
Nam Mang 1	Nam Mang	Mekong	18.53423°N 103.196286°E	2016	64	225	70	280	16.5	0.148
Nam Mang 3	Nam Gnogn	Mekong	18.349383°N 102.765244°E	2004	40	150	28	151	49	10
Nam Ngiep 1	Nam Ngiep	Mekong	18.645828°N 103.552329°E	2019	272	1,546	167	530	1,192	67
Nam Ngiep 1 (DS)	Nam Ngiep	Mekong	18.647966°N 103.571591°E	2019	18	105	20	90	4.6	1.27
Nam Ngiep 2	Nam Ngiep	Mekong	19.243328°N 103.283818°E	2015	180	732	70.5		163	
Nam Ngiep 2B	Nam Ngiep	Mekong	19.155918°N 103.346031°E	2015	18	76				
Nam Ngiep 3A	Nam Ngiep	Mekong	19.243546°N 103.283913°E	2014	44	144	30	110	13.85	1.8
Nam Ngum 1	Nam Ngum	Mekong	18.531068°N 102.547577°E	1971	315	1,455	70	468	4,700	370
Nam Ngum 2	Nam Ngum	Mekong	18.755374°N 102.776476°E	2011	615	2,300	181.5	421	3,590	122.2
Nam Ngum 5	Nam Ngum	Mekong	19.356095°N 102.621196°E	2012	120	507	104.5	258	314	14.6
Nam Ou 1	Nam Ou	Mekong	20.0883°N 102.265379°E	2019	160	710	65	442	89.1	9.56
Nam Ou 2	Nam Ou	Mekong	20.411698°N 102.472817°E	2016	120	546	55	352	121.7	15.7
Nam Ou 3	Nam Ou	Mekong	20.695251°N 102.665404°E	2020	150	685	72	340	168.6	13.26
Nam Ou 4	Nam Ou	Mekong	21.120153°N 102.494173°E	2020	116	524	47	300	124	9.37
Nam Ou 5	Nam Ou	Mekong	21.411349°N 102.344263°E	2016	240	1,049	74		335	17.22
Nam Ou 6	Nam Ou	Mekong	21.411349°N 102.344263°E	2016	180	739	88		409	17.01
Nam Ou 7	Nam Ou	Mekong	22.07779°N 102.264436°E	2020	190	811	147	825	1,494	38.16
Nam Pha Gnai	Nam Pha Gnai	Mekong	19.013318°N 102.264436°E	2016	19.2	130	65	148		1.5
Nam Phay	Nam Phay	Mekong	19.109357°N 102.757461°E	2018	86	419.5				18.92
Nam San 3A	Nam San	Mekong	19.129193°N 103.661752°E	2016	69	278.4	75	350	123	8.5
Nam San 3B	Nam San	Mekong	19.085633°N 103.619938°E	2015	45	198				
Nam Tha 1	Nam Tha	Mekong	20.249467°N 100.892433°E	2018	168	759.4	93.7	349.2	1,755	113.9
Nam Tha Had Muak	Nam Tha	Mekong	20.24264°N 100.712302°E	2022	37.5	102.67				
Nam Theun 1	Nam Theun	Mekong	18.356733°N 104.148017°E	2022	650	2,561	177	771	2,772	93.6
Nam Theun 2	Nam Theun/Xe Bangfai	Mekong	17.997353°N 104.952306°E	2010	1,075	5,936	48	325	3,500	450
Theun-Hinboun	Nam Theun	Mekong	18.261005°N 104.562525°E	1998	220	1,645	48	810	1,300	49
Theun-Hinboun Expansion Project	Nam Gnouang	Mekong	18.297248°N 104.636171°E	2013	222	1,395	65	480	2,450	49
Xayaburi	Mekong	Mekong	19.254006°N 101.813699°E	2019	1,285	6,035	48	810	1,300	49
Xe Kaman 1	Xe Kaman	Mekong	14.960724°N 107.156336°E	2018	290	1,096	120	185	4,804	149.8
Xe Kaman 3	Xe Kaman	Mekong	15.425194°N 107.362611°E	2014	250	1,000	102	543	141.5	5.2
Xe Kaman-Sanxay	Xe Kaman	Mekong	14.888908°N 107.117133°E	2018	32	131.2	28	180		1.76
Xe Lanong 1	Xe Lanong	Mekong	16.356276°N 106.238749°E	2020	70	269.9	67.5	302	953	
Xepian-Xenamnoy	Xepian/Xenamnoy	Mekong	15.026115°N 106.627369°E	2019	427	1,788	73	1,600	1,043	50.6
Xe Nam Noy - Xe Katam	Xenamnoi/Xekatam	Mekong	15.117928°N 106.616688°E	2016	20.1	83				
Xeset 1	Xeset	Mekong	15.49200°N 106.27867°E	1994	45	154	18	124		
Xeset 2	Xeset	Mekong	15.403775°N 106.280332°E	2009	76	309	26	144		
Xeset 3	Xe Don	Mekong	15.342113°N 106.31115°E	2017	23	80	11			1.3

Notes: COD = commercial operating date; MW = megawatt; GWh = gigawatt hours; m = metres; m^{3} = cubic metres; km^{2} = square kilometres.

Table 2: Hydropower dams under construction in Laos (15 MW installed capacity and above)

Project	River	River basin	Location	COD	Installed capacity (MW)	Mean annual energy (GWh)	Height (m)	Crest length (m)	Total storage (million m^{3})	Max reservoir area (km^{2})
Houay Kaouane		Mekong	20.06663°N 102.192339°E	?	24					
Luang Prabang	Mekong	Mekong	20.06663°N 102.192339°E	2030	1,460	6,500	80	275	1,589.5	72.39
Nam Ang	Nam Ang	Mekong	15.122545°N 107.108512°E	2024	31	183.3			0.03	
Nam Emoun	Nam Emoun	Mekong	15.5743°N 106.969395°E	2025	131.5	460.59	29	127	0.07	0.16
Nam Hinboun 1	Nam Hinboun	Mekong	17.728201°N 104.571382°E	2024	15	79.74	33	70		
Nam Hinboun 2	Nam Hinboun	Mekong	18.023739°N 104.425006°E	?	30	155.2	38			2.57
Nam Ngao	Nam Hinboun	Mekong	20.398288°N 100.431852°E	?	15	81.1		69	438.6	2.57
Nam Neun 3	Nam Neun	Vietnam Coast	20.018273°N 103.816601°E	2025	60	250	110	340		12
Nam Ngum 3	Nam Ngum	Mekong	19.084097°N 102.878817°E	2024	480	2,345	220	395	1,411	27.51
Nam Ngum 4	Nam Ngum	Mekong	19.453804°N 103.010325°E	2024	240	872	74	110		
Nam Phan (Bolevan)	Nam Phak	Mekong	15.075548°N 106.139196°E	2025	168	788				
Nam Pot 1	Nam Pot	Mekong	19.15518°N 103.266356°E	?	20	92				4.9
Nam Sam 3	Nam Sam	Vietnam Coast	20.149713°N 104.510899°E	2025	156	626				
Xe Lanong 2	Xe Lanong	Mekong	16.291893°N 106.517774°E	?	35	143	55			
Xekong A (DS)	Xekong	Mekong	14.599171°N 106.554175°E	2025	86	334.7	8.5		95.03	25.4
Xekong 4B (DS)	Xekong	Mekong	15.744284°N 106.748666°E	2027	175	801	117		1,004.7	22.4

Notes: COD = commercial operating date; MW = megawatt; GWh = gigawatt hours; m = metres; m^{3} = cubic metres; km^{2} = square kilometres.
