= The Panel of Environmental and Social Experts =

The Panel of Environmental and Social Experts (POE) is an advisory body made up of western academics which reports on the social and environmental costs of the Nam Theun 2 Dam, a hydroelectric project on the Nam Theun River in Laos. In its yearly to biyearly reports, the panel makes recommendations to minimize the project's negative impacts and maximize the positive effect. The panel also provided the initial social and environmental justification for the dam's creation. Despite its stated aims, the body has received numerous criticisms from scholars and NGOs regarding its efficacy. Allegations involve a neocolonial mindset and the suppression of negative findings for financial gain.

== Overview of the Project ==
The Nam Theun 2 Dam is a hydroelectric dam on the Nam Theun River in Laos. Before the commercial operations of the plant began in March 2010, the World Bank along with other investors conducted various tests of the projects social, environmental, and economic impacts. The project had to divert water from the Nam Theun River, a tributary of the larger Mekong River, to the Xe Bang Fai River in order to create an elevation difference so that the gravity dam would function. By damming the river, the project made fundamental changes to the biodiversity and the indigenous communities of the area. Although accounts vary dramatically, many agree that approximately 6,200 indigenous people living on the Nakai Plateau have been resettled to make way for this project. Additionally, more than 110,000 people downstream, who depend on the Xe Bang Fai and Nam Theun rivers for their livelihoods, have been directly affected by the project, due to destruction of fisheries, flooding of riverbank gardens and water quality problems.

== Reason for the POE's Existence ==
During the 1990s, the World Bank received criticism for merely doing engineering and economic assessments of the proposed projects thereby dismissing the significance or reliability of social or environmental issues. The POE is one of many aspects of the multi-layered environmental and social monitoring and evaluation mechanisms, which advise the Nam Theun 2 project. In the 1995, World Bank President James Wolfensohn canceled the Arun 3 dam in Nepal after receiving claims that the feasibility studies conducted for the project ignored the strong likelihood of negative ecological and social effects. Goldman labels this phenomenon the “Narmada effect” in which the Bank staff remind themselves that they must “reform or die” in order to continue their development projects. This effect also relates to the growing interest and activity of NGOs that pursue environmental and social goals. The Nam Theun 2 dam project is the ideal venue for the World Bank and other agencies to show that they are properly accounting for social and environmental concerns.

== Role of the POE ==
The panel's primary responsibility is to review the environmental and social issues that are associated with the Nam Theun 2 Dam. The panel will then provide guidance to local and international actors in order to align the project with the World Bank's guidelines for the treatment of indigenous people, environmental concerns, and resettlement. Although the POE's findings and recommendations are submitted directly to the World Bank and the Ministry of Industry and Handicraft, it makes autonomous determinations as which environmental and social issues deserve the most attention within the confines of the terms of reference. It has issued annual or biannual reports since February 1997, totaling 21 as of March 2013. The panel's purview extends through the entire Nam Theun River basin from the Mekong River to the border of Vietnam, the inter-basin transfers to the Xe Bang Fai and Nam Hinboun rivers, the NT2 transmission line, and all the projects and enhancements impacted by water releases from the Nam Theun reservoir. The POE is also part of a larger restructuring of the Lao state. The Nam Theun 2 project involves the implementation of new laws, regulations, and management techniques of both the country's natural resources and the indigenous people who depend on them. The POE's reports are included in the dialogue and legal process providing legitimacy for the parties that use their reports as evidence.

== Members ==
Members of the POE are western academics who specialize in various social or environmental issues. Over the course of their visits, these members interact with local officials, project workers, and the general population who influence their assessments. Although the Panel uses the information that they gained from these interactions, the members work collaboratively to write the final reports.

=== Original members ===
- T. Scudder,
- T. C. Whitmore
- Lee M. Talbot

=== Current members ===
- David McDowell
- Thayer Scudder

== Activities of the POE ==
The Panel's 6th mission demonstrates the aspects of a typical visit. The members arrived in Vientiane on January 4 and departed January 25, 2003. Initially, they met with GOL and the Nam Theun 2 Power Company. Next they spent eight days in the field observing and communicating with villages in the Upper Nam Hinboun Basin. They also meet with district officials and staff involved with resettlement to ensure that the project was fulfilling World Bank guidelines. Like every visit, the panel sought to examine developments that have taken place since the Panel's most recent visits, to visit areas not previously seen, and to participate in the review of documentation being prepared under Company auspices as a World Bank requirement for project appraisal.

== Factors that limit the POE's evaluations ==
There are important institutional factors that guide the POE and other independent groups that work with the Nam Theun 2 project. In exchange for unique research opportunities, access to formerly inaccessible research sites, and high wages, the Bank specifies what kind of information is needed, the time frame for the research, and the deadline for the written report. The terms of reference also give the Bank, the Ministry of Industry and Handicraft, and other groups exclusive ownership of the raw data and the finished reports which means that the data cannot be distributed without permission from the contractor. The World Bank has chosen to make the POE reports public. In response to the time constraints, between one and two weeks, POE members employ “rapid rural appraisal” methods. These methods involve the quick and cost effectively extraction and analysis of information from respondents and secondary data. As a result of this research model, the Bank incentives researchers to work quickly with less contact with locals. Many researchers also argue that the complexities of the Mekong River, it changes from season to season and tributary to tributary, require more researchers and time to properly analyze. More importantly, because the Bank pays researchers to answer specific questions through the terms of reference, some researchers state that they are unable to discuss the more intricate facets of their research thereby reducing the reports viability.

== Rational for the POE's Endorsement of the Initial Project ==
While the POE acknowledge that large scale projects such as the Nam Theun 2 dam present future environmental and social disadvantages which are often overlooked or impossible to predict, the POE wrote that they endorsed the World Bank's participation based on five major considerations.

The panel was concerned with what they measured to be the significantly deteriorating living standard of the inhabits of the NNT Conservation and the Nakai Plateau and the NNT Conservation Area. They also pointed to the area's deteriorating environment and biodiversity. In the Nakai Plateau, the POE estimated that 50 percent of the people were below the Lao PDR's poverty line. Furthermore, the poor in these areas were increasingly reliant on food relief due to crop failures. They also had no access to medical facilities. Intensifying these problems, the population growth rate was nearing three percent. The POE attributes many of these problems to the declining populations of natural predators in the ecosystem due to overhunting by the indigenous people and foreign poachers. These opinions are grounded with correlational evidence that shows a sharp increase of insects and rodents that intensified the famines and diseases in the area. The POE also found four indigenous cultures: the Atel, the Themarou, the Mlengbrou, and the Ahoe that would become extinct by the early 21st century without foreign intervention. The POE believed that a wider range of economic opportunities created by the project would provide members of these cultures with the means of survival and an escape from poverty. The POE was also swayed by the commitment of the consortium (NTEC) to improve the living standards of impacted people beyond the standards required by the World Bank. Its involvement in the drafting of a national resettlement policy for development projects would help the Nam Theun 2 project become a model for future development projects both in Laos and the rest of the world. Most importantly, the consortium agreed to make one million dollars available annually for thirty years to protect National Biodiversity Conservation Area.

The POE determined that the dam would be built regardless of the World Bank's Participation and, with its involvement, greater credence and would be given to remedy the social and environmental externalities associated with the project. The POE deemed that Laos had two major resources that could be exploited to generate enough revenue to raise the living standards throughout the country. In 1997, the POE estimated that large-scale deforestation and lumbering provided 40 percent of the foreign exchange for Laos. Due to deforestation caused by the conversion to agriculture and this lumbering, the POE believed that this process was unsustainable. As such, the government would seek to utilize hydropower to facilitate development. Given previous projects in the Bolaven Plateau in southern Laos, the POE believed that the government alone could not be looked to account and provide for the negative externalities associated with the project.

In the interest of biodiversity and other environmental concerns, five large vertebrate mammals had been newly discovered in the five years before the 1997 report. The area is the largest contiguous forest in Laos with extraordinary botanical richness. Without the World Bank's participation, the logging halted by the project would resume along with road building without consideration for local flora and fauna and the Vietnamese and Hmong hunters and traders who depend on them. Therefore, although the dam would destroy some of the wide life in the area, it was preferable to the deforestation that would continue without intervention.

Finally, the POE believed that they would lose the ability to establish a model in which environmental and cultural concerns are integral to the interplay between the government, the World Bank, and the private sector. Also, a failure to implement the project would be a significant blow and a justifiable source of criticism for the parties involved. This blow would undermine the World Bank's ability to fund more development projects and accomplish its goals.

== Opposition to the POE's Initial Recommendation ==
After the project got approved, NGOs based in Berkeley and Bangkok evaluated the POE's report and the report of the Australian engineering firm, Snowy Mountains Engineering Company, which the World Bank had contracted to conduct a feasibility study. These NGOs argued that the POE's assessment was seriously flawed and the Bank eventually agreed with the NGOs. After another attempt to approve the project using the Thai-based engineering group TEAM, the Bank continued to be challenged by international activists and called for a third round of feasibility studies. Finally, the bank incorporated NGOs into the process adding the multiple layers of social and environmental oversight that exist today.

== Current Recommendations ==
The POE recommends various actions to local and international actors in each report. Its twenty first and most recent report in March 2013 demonstrates is mentality towards advancing social and environmental concerns in the region.

In this report, the POE was most interested in reducing poaching in the watershed areas created by the project. They advise that conservation patrols intensify especially during the wet season. They advise the Provincial and Central Government authorities to take effective action to recognize and halt the subversion of village authorities in the NPA for the illegal Rosewood trade. This includes cracking down on the participants, supporters and enablers of the trade within and outside of government at village, district, province or higher level.

Generally, recommendation also extend the scope of law enforcement by supplying them with more equipment and giving them control over various groups to more effectively and efficiently manage the local resources. These resources include the reservoir, fishery, and other natural resources.

The POE also recommends that the WMPA and other groups elevate the educational requirements for staff members and replace existing staff with university graduates or experienced staff from conservation organizations.

Finally, recommendations, including the most recent report, stress increased monitoring of track construction and other forms of development. The POE advised the destruction of any track that was created without the approval of the WMPA plans. The POE grounds this recommendation with their goal to reduce poaching and other social and environmental ills caused by locals or other non-World Bank influences.

== Allegations of Suppression of Negative Findings ==
While few allegations of suppression are directed at the POE specifically, many scholars believe that the issue is widespread creating a culture of compliance to neoliberal ideas and recommendations. For example, Tyson Roberts is an ichthyologist who specializes in the Mekong fisheries. He was hired to conduct a fishery study for the Nam Theun 2 project. Like a number of his peers, Roberts publicly cautioned the government and the Bank against rapid assessments of the river without extensive data on fish migration. Halfway through this consultancy, he was fired and his visa was removed and another Northern scientist conducted rapid appraisals the World Bank needed to continue the project. Since EIAs and SIAs can delay or event prevent a projects implementation, scholars believe that the World Bank is incentivized to rush and suppress the assessments in order to make the loans required for the project to continue. Also narrowing the POE's intellectual scope, the reports focus on the knowledge of three experts thereby subjugating the knowledge of the millions of “nonexperts” that are perceived as the object of study and of development. Scholars show that surveys characterize populations based on enduring social categories such as fisher or hunter while ignoring their local knowledge of the fish and animals in the area.

== Allegations of a Neocolonialist Mindset ==
Many scholars assert that environmental projects such as the Nam Theun 2 dam are a legitimizing vehicle for the establishment of western property rights and oversight by the state that accompanies the development of fixed capital infrastructure. For these scholars, including Goldman, the POE is a pro-active response to transnational environmental organizations, networks, and movements.

Some scholars believe that the POE composition reflects neo-colonial goals and mentalities. The large portion of the POE's budget spent sending the western members of the Panel to Laos and back from their home countries instead of relying upon local professionals shows distrust in the competency of the Laotian researchers and analysts. Similarly, Laotian civil servants are paid a tiny fraction of what their western counterparts earn for their work. Additionally, many of these local officials are relegated to translators. This aligns with the argument that the POE and the World Bank suppress local knowledge. Scholars argue that as the indigenous people become increasingly commoditized an asymmetric relationship develops between development experts and the beneficiaries who are perceived as irrational, environmentally degrading, and in dire need of development at almost any cost. The POE funding proposals involved teaching Laotian proto-professional English and sending the abroad to learn to identify endogenous species only to return to Laos to staff conservation agencies. Even when the POE or other groups discuss the project in the numerous public consultations on the dam, they use language that the villagers cannot understand. The Banks failure to communicate with the “objects” of development shows to some scholars that the project is informed by a neocolonial mindset.
