= Nam Theun 2 Dam =

Nam Theun 2
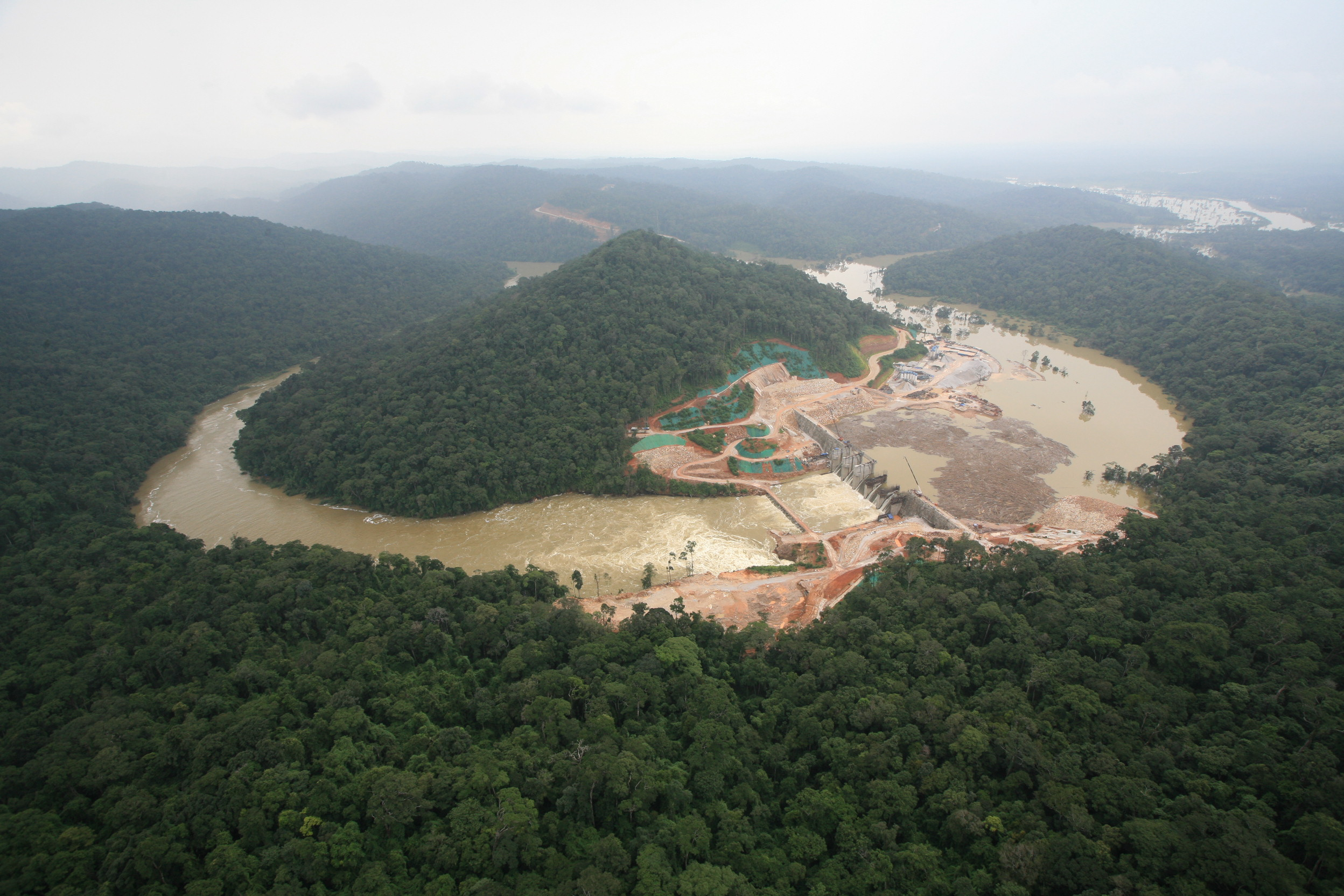

- Location within Laos
- Location: Bolikhamsai and Khammouane Provinces, Laos
- Coordinates: 17°59′49″N 104°57′10″E
- Construction began: 2005
- Opening date: December 2010 (Inauguration)

Dam and spillways
- Type of dam: Gravity dam
- Impounds: Nam Theun
- Height: 39 m (128 ft)
- Length: 436 m (1,430 ft)

Reservoir
- Total capacity: 3.53 km^{3} (2,860,000 acre⋅ft)
- Catchment area: 4,039 km^{2} (1,559 mi^{2})
- Surface area: 450 km^{2} (170 mi^{2})

Power Station
- Operator: Nam Theun 2 Power Company
- Commission date: April 2010
- Turbines: EDL: 2 × 37.5 MW Pelton turbine EGAT: 4 × 250 MW Francis turbine
- Installed capacity: 1,075 MW

The Nam Theun 2 Hydropower Project, or simply NT2, is a hydroelectric dam on the Nam Theun River in Laos. Commercial operation of the plant began in April 2010. The scheme diverts water from the Nam Theun, a tributary of the Mekong River, to the Xe Bang Fai River, enabling a generation capacity of 1,075 MW, from a 350 m (1,148 ft) difference in elevation between the reservoir and the power station.

It is the 2nd largest hydroelectric project so far in Laos after Xayaburi Dam, exporting power to Thailand as well as supplying the local area with electricity. At the time of signing in 2005, NT2 was the largest foreign investment in Laos, the world's largest private sector cross-border power project financing, the largest private sector hydroelectric project financing, and one of the largest internationally financed IPP projects in Southeast Asia. The dam also marked a return by the World Bank to funding large-scale infrastructure, after a decade-long hiatus.

According to the government of Laos, "the project is an essential part of the country's development framework and the project's implementation is likely to be the first real possibility for (Laos) to reduce gradually its dependence on Official Development Assistance".

The project has significant environmental and social impacts, and comprehensive measures have been designed to mitigate these. According to a group of social and environmental experts who advise on the project, these measures could become a global model. Although Newsweek referred to it as a "kinder and gentler dam", the project has also attracted criticism.

By 2015, it was possible to see the effect of the dam and criticism mounted. A group of non-governmental organisations said: "Ten years after the start of the construction of the Nam Theun 2 Dam in Central Laos, it is clear that this mega project has disastrous impacts on people and their environment."

== History and current status ==
The Nam Theun 2 project was identified in the 1980s and a concession was awarded in 1993. It was subjected to a long anti-dam campaign. The project was frozen after the 1997 Asian financial crisis, but preparation resumed in 1999. In October 2002 a concession contract between the Nam Theun 2 Power Company (NTPC) and the government of Laos was signed, followed by the signing of power purchase agreements (PPA) in November 2003 between NTPC on the one hand and, Electricity Generating Authority of Thailand (EGAT) and the Laotian state-owned power company Electricite du Laos (EDL) on the other. Financial closing was reached in June 2005. The Nam Theun River diversion was begun in March 2006 and then closed in April 2008 following completion of the Nakai Dam wall. Impoundment of the Nakai Reservoir occurred over the 2008 wet season and the reservoir was close to full supply level by the end of 2008. Test hydro power generation began in mid-2009 and the commercial operation date was achieved in April 2010.

== Technical features ==
NT2 enables Laos to export 995 MW of electrical energy to the EGAT. The project also supplies 75 MW of capacity for domestic use in Laos.

Nam Theun 2 is a trans-basin diversion power plant that uses water from the Nam Theun River and releases the water into the Xe Bang Fai River. The project site is in Khammouane and Bolikhamxay Provinces in central Laos, about 250 kilometers east of Vientiane. It stretches from the Nakai Plateau to the lower Xe Bang Fai River confluence with the Mekong.

The main features of the project include:

- 39 m (128 ft) high gravity dam
- 450 km^{2} (170 mi^{2}) reservoir
- Pressure shaft, pressure tunnel and a powerhouse
- 8,000,000 m^{3} (280,000,000 ft^{3}) artificial regulating pond, and a 27 km (17 mi) artificial downstream channel leading to the Xe Bang Fai River
- 130 km (81 mi) long, double-circuit 500 kV transmission line to the Thai grid
- 70 km (43 mi) long, single-circuit 115 kV transmission line to the Lao domestic grid.

== Institutional arrangements ==
The project is structured as a build-operate-transfer (BOT) project. It has a concession period of 31 years, of which the operating period is 25 years. At the end of the concession period, the project facilities will be transferred to the government free of charge.

The project was developed by NTPC, which is owned by a consortium composed of EDF (40%), Electricity Generating PCL (EGCO) of Thailand (35%), and the Government of Laos (25%). Governments and government-owned enterprises own a majority of NTPC. This arrangement is atypical of an IPP. Normally the power generating company is privately owned.

Laos is a People's Democratic Republic (PDR) with a one-party system under the Lao People's Revolutionary Party. It is one of the few communist states in the world.

The government has multiple roles related to NT2, some of which may be conflicting: It partially owns NTPC and thus has an interest in the financial profitability of the project; it is supposed to monitor compliance with environmental and social safeguards under the concession contract; and it buys some of the electricity generated from the project through the state-owned power company EDL and thus has an interest in low electricity prices.

Some of the owners of NTPC are also contractors engaged in the construction of the dam. For example, EDF International is the lead contractor for the project under a turnkey contract. It has engaged various sub-contractors for specific parts of the project.

== Financial aspects ==
=== Project costs and financing ===
Construction costs were initially estimated at US$1,250 million plus US$331.5 million for contingencies. More recently construction costs have been given as US$1.3 billion.

The project base cost is funded through US$330 million of equity and US$920 million of debt. It is financed through equity, loans and guarantees from 26 financial institutions, including

- four multilateral development banks (the World Bank Group, the Asian Development Bank (ADB), the European Investment Bank (EIB), and the Nordic Investment Bank),
- three export credit agencies (Coface of France, EKN of Sweden, and GIEK of Norway),
- three bilateral financing agencies (French Development Agency, PROPARCO, and the Export-Import Bank of Thailand),
- nine international commercial banks providing finance in hard currencies (grouped together in a "lead arrangers group" including BNP Paribas, Crédit Agricole Indosuez, ANZ from Australia, Société Générale, Fortis Bank, and Bank of Tokyo-Mitsubishi), and
- seven Thai commercial banks providing finance in Thai baht.

All financing in hard currencies is guaranteed through political risk insurance provided by the above-mentioned three export credit agencies, the ADB (US$50 million), the International Development Association (IDA) of the World Bank Group (US$50 million), and the Multilateral Investment Guarantee Agency (MIGA) of the World Bank Group (US$91 million). Specifically, MIGA has provided a US$86 million guarantee to Fortis Bank of Belgium against the risks of expropriation, breach of contract, war and civil disturbance, as well as transfer inconvertibility in both Laos and Thailand. According to MIGA, its guarantee "was key to lowering the project's risk profile, which in turn enabled the government and developers to attract commercial financing at better rates and gave the investor the assurance needed to go ahead with the deal".

The government's initial equity contribution of US$83 million (25%) was largely funded by donors, including a US$20 million grant from the International Development Association of the World Bank Group, the ADB (US$20 million), France, and the EIB.

=== Increase in government revenue and contribution to poverty alleviation ===
According to the government "the Project is an essential part of the country's development framework and the Project's implementation is likely to be the first real possibility for (Laos) to reduce gradually its dependence on Official Development Assistance." In the same vein, the then Managing Director of the World Bank, Shengman Zhang, said in 2003 "We see Nam Theun 2 not as a project per se, but as a vehicle through which to make a considerable progress in the effort of poverty reduction."

The project generates three forms of revenue:

- dividends
- taxes
- royalties, i.e., concession fees.

Government revenue is estimated at US$1.9bn to US$2bn in nominal terms over 25 years. It has been estimated that at a 10% discount rate the net present value of the revenues will be six times higher than the net present value from the debt service, if all government equity was funded through concessionary lending. Revenues are expected to increase progressively from approximately US$10M in 2009 to US$110 to 150M per year at the end of the concession period in 2033. Thereafter the government will receive all revenues accruing to the project.

The power purchase agreement (PPA) between EGAT and NTPC was designed as to stabilize the cash flow despite hydrological variation and consequently variation in power output. Revenues will be partially in USD and partially in Thai baht. Power demand from Thailand is expected to be strong. In December 2007, Thailand and Laos signed an agreement increasing the total power to be supplied by Laos to Thailand from all sources in 2015 from 5,000 MW to 7,000 MW.

The World Bank works with the Lao government to improve public financial management practices and increase transparency in order to increase the likelihood that revenues will be used to benefit the poor, including through investment in health and education. The government has agreed with the World Bank to implement a Poverty Reduction Fund that is being initially sourced from International Development Association funds, and then from the government's taxes, royalties, and dividends once the project commences operation. Special administrative units are being established to deal with the effective management and allocation of the funds earned by the project.

In 2007 Laos was ranked on the Corruption Perception Index by Transparency International 168 out of 179 countries assessed, making it one of the most corrupt countries on the index.

== Environmental and social impacts ==
Environmental and social impacts of the project include downstream impacts, impacts on biodiversity, resettlement, and reservoir sedimentation. More details can be found in the Environmental and Social Impact assessment, and in the summary provided for the various impacts below.

Monitoring and evaluation

NT2 has a multi-layer environmental and social monitoring and evaluation mechanism consisting of the following elements:

- The Panel of Environmental and Social Experts) (POE) reports to the government. The POE normally visits Laos at least once per year.
- An International Advisory Group (IAG), advising the World Bank. The IAG normally visits Laos at least once per year.
- Independent Monitoring Agencies, reporting to the government. The Independent Monitoring Agencies were in the process of being assembled in December 2006.
- The Lenders' Engineer

The comprehensive environmental and social measures designed to mitigate potential environmental and social impacts could become a "global model", according to a group of social and environmental experts who advise on the project.

According to the NGO International Rivers, there have been substantial shortcomings in the mitigation of impacts. According to the organization, compensation payments and replacement land for villagers affected by construction activities have been "inadequate, unfair or non-existent". Poor resettlement planning has led to housing and infrastructure delays. Plans to restore the livelihoods of villagers on the Nakai Plateau and along the Xe Bang Fai have yet to be finalized. And the budget for the downstream program in particular is said to be inadequate.

Bruce Shoemaker, editor of Dead in the Water, claims that the scientific consensus is that the dam's costs outweigh its benefits and that the dam represents a "complete failure of water governance in [the] Mekong region."

According to data in the World Bank publication "Good dams, bad dams", the ratio of area flooded and people resettled per megawatt of installed electricity generating capacity (flooded area of 41 hectare per MW and five persons resettled per MW) is neither very high nor very low, compared to 48 other large dams analyzed. Using this specific analytical framework, Nam Theun 2 could neither be considered a "good" or a "bad" dam.

=== Downstream impacts in Xe Bang Fai River ===
The flow of water in the Xe Bang Fai (XBF), which received the water diverted through NT2, increased significantly, thus affecting the population living downstream of the release point.

The exact number of people affected is disputed. While NTPC speaks of 40,000 affected people, the NGO Environmental Defense speaks of up to 150,000 people. The impacts have been widely studied and have been discussed with local communities. Negative impacts on the downstream population include the washing away of river bank gardens, changes in water quality, and impacts on fisheries.

NTPC promised to stop power production when floods occur on the Xe Bang Fai. However, it is as yet unknown exactly how long this flooding period will last for each year. The length of the period affects the project's profitability.

Water quality is negatively impacted through fouling of biomass in the reservoir. Because the impacts are unknown, monitoring systems are included and a commitment has been made to "adaptive management".

Livelihood development programs were put in place for the villagers living downstream on the Xe Bang Fai, in districts such as Mahaxai. The programs are focused on agriculture, fish ponds, and handicrafts to help them generate income beyond that derived from fishing. The objective is to help villagers generate money from a variety of different sources to compensate for any changes in fishing catches after the river diversion. Affected communities receive irrigation systems to allow for a second, dry season rice crop, drinking water systems, and access to electricity. The provision of this infrastructure is not the responsibility of NTPC, but of the government.

According to a joint progress report issued by the World Bank and the ADB in December 2007, implementation of the downstream program – particularly on implementing livelihood programs – was a challenge. Lessons from the 20 villages where the programs have been piloted in a participatory manner are being applied as other villages were included. Micro-credit schemes that are being developed were not yet on a sustainable financial footing.

=== Downstream impacts on the Nam Theun River ===
There is relatively little information on downstream impacts on the Nam Theun River, where water flows will be significantly reduced. No permanent villages lie along the Nam Theun some 50 km downstream below the dam. Fishermen and hunters, however, do use this stretch of the river. Fish diversity and abundance is expected to be affected by reduced water flows and sediment content. Monitoring of the villages along the river conducted by NTPC has not yet detected any significant impacts to the fishery.

=== Biodiversity and forests ===
Three existing protected areas on the Nakai plateau (the Nakai-Nam Theun, the Hin Nam Nor, and the Phou Hin Poun National Biodiversity Conservation Areas), together nine times larger (4,106 km^{2}) than the flooded area, are expected to be better managed through significant resources made available under the project – more than 60 times what the government has spent on its entire national parks system so far. The flooded areas are not considered critical natural habitat. Formerly there was significant illegal logging in the protected areas, which the government claims has now been largely brought under control despite growing evidence that villagers are using logging to supplement falling incomes.

Detailed fish surveys showed that there are no fish species living only in the stretch of the river that will be inundated. A management plan for the Asian elephants in the area has been drawn up. A Watershed Management Protection Authority (WMPA) has been established with the specific purpose of protecting the watershed of the reservoir and the protected areas in it. WPMA will receive US$1M annually from NTPC through the concession period.

=== Resettlement ===
Seventeen villages and their 6,300 inhabitants moved from the area that became the NT2 reservoir on the Nakai Plateau to custom-built villages built in consultation with the resettled communities. NTPC and the Lao Government have committed to doubling the income of resettled villagers, through livelihood programs, five years after they have been relocated. This means that people who used to make US$410 per household a year in 2005 should make at least US$820 per household a year by 2012.

Construction of the villages and major facilities (new roads, water pumps, toilets, schools, mills, and electricity) was completed by mid-2008. Consultations on house design, location, and construction materials were held and continue to ensure the outcomes reflect the needs of the local people. According to a World Bank report, the health of villagers who have already been resettled has significantly improved due to better water and sanitation, regular health check-ups and the provision of mosquito nets, as documented by various assessments. Experts are helping the resettled villagers to adopt improved practices to increase agricultural and income productivity. The report stresses that the pace of the development of the livelihood activities must be accelerated including engaging additional technical assistance to help villagers develop the most effective cropping systems possible.

=== Reservoir sedimentation ===
At current sedimentation rates, the reservoir has a lifetime of more than five centuries. If substantial logging occurred in the upstream basin, the lifetime would be accordingly reduced and could affect the financial and economic viability of the project. This would especially be the case if sediments remained in the active storage area in the upper part of the reservoir instead of being washed into the dead storage area closer to the dam in the lower part of the reservoir. The establishment of the relatively well-funded Watershed Management Protection Authority is expected to protect forest cover and thus limit erosion in the watershed of the reservoir.

== See also ==
- Environmental impacts of dams
- Energy Industry Liberalization and Privatization (Thailand)
- Wildlife of Laos
- Economy of Laos
