= List of defunct airlines of Laos =

This is a list of defunct airlines of Laos.

Airline	Image	IATA	ICAO	Callsign	Commenced operations	Ceased operations	Notes
Air Architects					1968	1968	
Air Laos					1952	1961	Rebranded as Royal Air Lao
Air Union Laos							
Air Vientiane					1971	1974	
Angkor International Airlines					1975	1975	
BirdAir					1960	1980	The airline ceased operations in 1975, it was reincarnated in 1975 and ceased operations in 1980.
Boun Oum Airways					1964	1967	Integrated into Continental Air Services, Inc
Civil Aviation Company					1976	1979	Rebranded as Lao Aviation
Euro Asia Aviation			EUL	EUROLAO	2002	2003	
Hang Meas Airlines					1974	1975	
Khemara Air Transport							
Lane Xang Airlines					1973	1975	
Lao Air					2002	2014	Rebranded as Lao Skyway
Lao Air Lines		WL			1967	1973	Merged with Royal Air Lao to form the Civil Aviation Company
Lao Aviation		QV	LAO		1976	2003	Rebranded as Lao Airlines
Lao Capricorn Air			LKA		2008	2010	Rebranded as Phongsavanh Airlines
Lao Cathay Airlines					1967	1968	
Lao Central Airlines		LF	LKA	NAKLAO	2010	2014	
Pathet Lao Airlines					1960	1974	
Phongsavanh Airlines					2010	2012	Rebranded as Lao Central Airlines
Royal Air Lao					1962	1976	Merged with Lao Air Lines to form the Civil Aviation Company
Samaki Peanich Airlines					1972	1975	
Sorya Airlines					1974	1975	
Xieng Khouang Air Transport					1967	1975	

== See also ==
- List of airlines of Laos
- List of airports in Laos
