= NTPC =

NTPC may refer to:

- Nam Theun 2 Power Company, a Laotian company
- NTPC Limited (formerly National Thermal Power Corporation), an Indian government-owned company
- Northwest Territories Power Corporation, a Canadian company
- New Taipei City, Taiwan
- New Taipei City Government, Taiwan
