= B. Home Phanh =

- Village
- Location within Laos
- Coordinates: 20.48°N 104.26°E
- Country: Laos

B. Home Phanh is a small village along Highway 6A in the South Asian country of Laos, settled near the border between Laos and Vietnam, with around 20-120 residents.

== See also ==
- Economy of Laos
- History of Laos
