= Lao Holding State Enterprise =

Company of Laos

Lao Holding State Enterprise (LHSE) is a state corporation of Laos that is primarily involved with the financing of the energy industry, including the Nam Theun 2 Power Company, of whose stock it controls 25%. LHSE is involved with other projects of Laos' energy infrastructure, including Nam Ngum Dam, Nam Ngiep Dam and the Hongsa Lignite Power Plant. The company is part of the Ministry of Finance.

== See also ==
- Government of Laos
- Energy in Laos
