= Trade unions in Laos =

- National organization(s): LFTU
- Primary legislation: Trade Union Act (2007)
- Total union membership: 155,000 (2011)

International Labour Organization
- Laos is a member of the ILO

Convention ratification
- Freedom of Association: Not ratified
- Right to Organise: Not ratified

Trade unions in Laos have been active in the country since at least the mid-20th Century.

== 20th Century ==
During the Royal Lao Government three statutes were passed that governed industrial relations (1955, 1967 and 1971). The largest union during this period was the Lao Civil Servants Union, founded in 1959. A number of unions, including the Civil Servants Union, started the Lao Labour Federation around the same time. Laos joined the International Labour Organization in 1964.

With the start of the Laotian Civil War, the Lao Workers Union was established in areas controlled by the Pathet Lao. Trade unionists took active part in the demonstrations that ushered in the Lao People's Democratic Republic in 1975. In 1983, the Lao Federation of Trade Unions held its first congress.

== Current situation ==
The current law forbids independent trade unions requiring all unions to belong to the sole national centre, the LFTU. The Labour Law of 2006 forbids work stoppages and strikes. Employees in state enterprises and government officers constitute the largest membership of trade unions in Laos.

Laos has not ratified the two core Conventions covering trade union rights of association and collective bargaining.
