= Tourism in Laos =

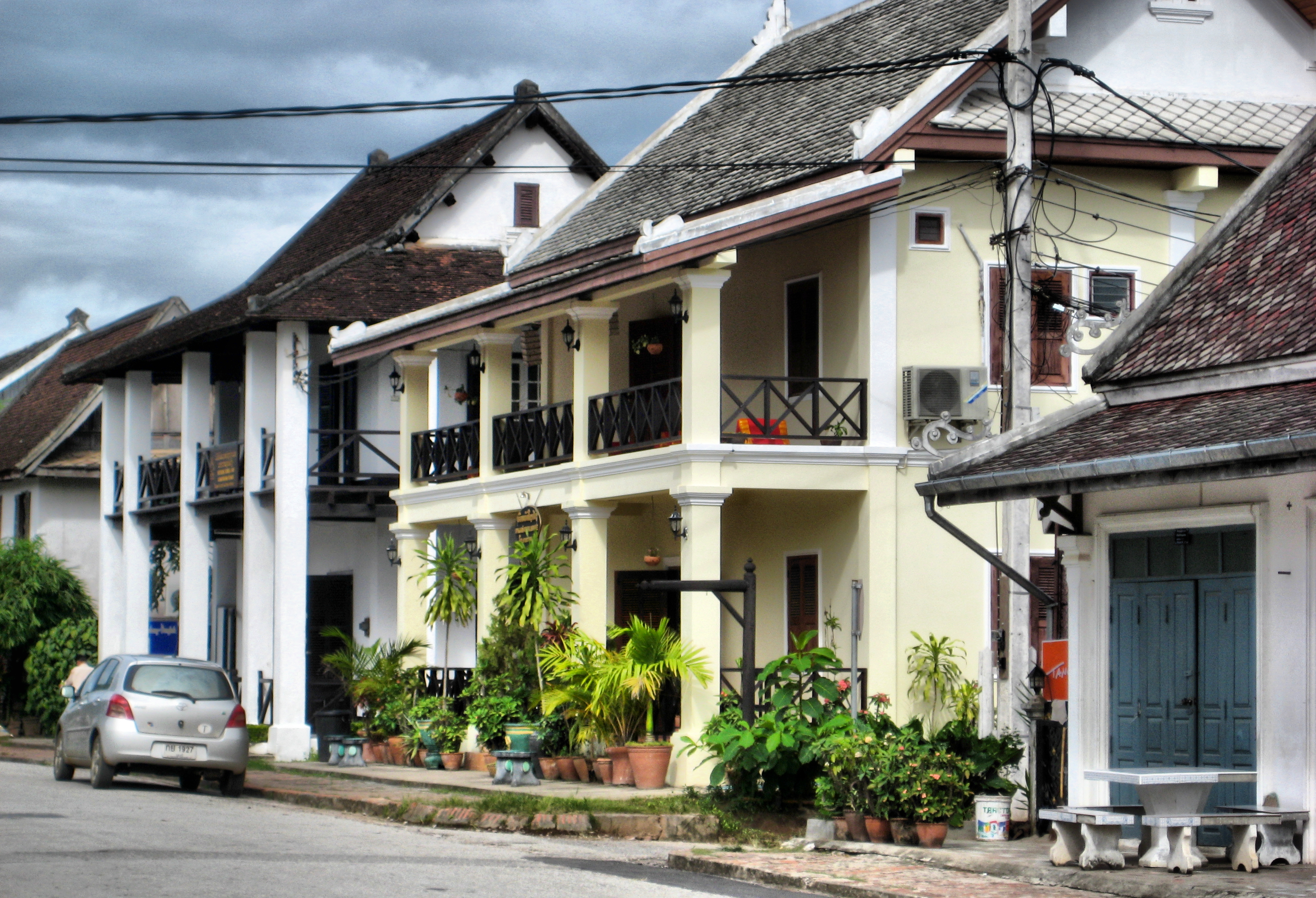
Guest houses in Luang Prabang

Tourism in Laos is a part of the economy of Laos. In 2024, tourist numbers topped 5 million, contributing over US$1 billion to the economy. Tourism is the third largest source of foreign income for the Laos government, behind mining and electricity generation. In 2019, 4.79 million international tourists visited Laos, spending US$931 million, representing 9.1% of the Lao economy, and created employment for 300,000 people.

The top four sources of international tourists in 2019 were Thailand (45%), China (21.3%), Vietnam (19.3%) and South Korea (4.2%).

The Laos-China Railway has facilitated the entry of more tourists, particularly from China, into Laos. The railway opened in 2021, and cross-border service between Laos and China began in 2023. Compared to its neighbour Thailand, Laos is said to be a more difficult country to enter by air, especially via long-haul air routes. In 2024, there were over 46 million airline seats to Thailand, and less than 1.8 million going to Laos. These services typically enter from China or Thailand, meaning visitors may combine their trip with visits to neighbouring countries and not travel only to Laos, due to the need to transit through them to reach Laos.

== Statistics ==
Tourist arrivals of 2024 in %

=== Annual statistics ===
Year	Tourist Arrivals	Change	Source
2020	886,447	▼81.5%	
2019	4,791,065	▲14.4%	
2018	4,186,432	▲8.2%	
2017	3,868,838	▼8.7%	
2016	4,239,047	▼9.5%	
2015	4,684,429	▲12.6%	
2014	4,158,719	▲10.0%	
2013	3,779,490	▲13.5%	
2012	3,330,072	▲22.3%	
2011	2,723,564	▲8.4%	
2010	2,513,028	▲25.1%	
2009	2,008,363	▲15.6%	
2008	1,736,787	▲6.9%	
2007	1,623,943	▲33.6%	
2006	1,215,106	▲10.9%	
2005	1,095,315	▲22.4%	
2004	894,806	▲40.6%	
2003	636,361	▼13.5%	
2002	735,662	▲9.2%	
2001	673,823	▼8.6%	
2000	737,208	▲20.8%	
1999	614,278	▲22.8%	
1998	500,200	▲8.0%	
1997	463,200	▲14.9%	
1996	403,000	▲16.3%	
1995	346,460	▲137.0%	
1994	146,155	▲42.0%	
1993	102,946	▲17.6%	
1992	87,571	▲132.8%	
1991	37,613	▲161.2%	
1990	14,400	-	

Notes:

1.COVID-19 pandemic.
2.SARS epidemic
3.September 11 attacks

=== International visitor arrivals ===
Rank	Country	2020	2019	2018	2017	2016	2015	2014	2013	2012	2011	2010	2009	2008
1	Thailand*	350,103	2,160,300	1,929,934	1,797,803	2,009,605	2,321,352	2,043,761	2,059,434	1,937,612	1,579,941	1,517,064	1,274,064	891,448
2	Vietnam*	186,180	924,875	867,585	891,643	998,400	1,187,954	1,108,332	910,164	705,596	561,586	431,011	296,763	351,384
3	China	138,466	1,022,727	705,833	639,185	545,493	511,436	422,440	245,033	199,857	150,791	161,854	128,226	105,852
4	South Korea	40,210	203,191	174,405	170,571	173,260	165,328	96,085	81,799	53,829	34,707	27,312	17,876	18,065
5	United States	18,116	61,184	49,178	38,765	58,094	63,058	61,460	61,608	53,380	50,092	49,782	39,339	54,717
6	France	15,509	44,416	39,315	36,760	54,953	55,151	52,146	52,411	46,903	44,399	44,844	31,775	39,077
7	Japan	11,085	41,736	38,985	32,064	49,191	43,826	44,877	48,644	42,026	37,883	34,076	28,081	31,569
8	United Kingdom	11,592	31,976	26,801	27,723	39,170	41,508	39,061	41,741	35,964	35,622	37,272	27,044	36,038
9	Germany	8,632	25,346	22,915	23,776	34,018	31,897	29,800	29,250	23,417	21,280	22,583	17,710	25,191
10	Australia	7,271	24,750	19,607	20,886	33,077	34,665	44,964	35,441	33,878	31,874	30,538	24,209	28,180
11	Malaysia*	5,800	28,321	26,002	19,114	24,391	24,095	24,312	26,035	22,785	17,702	15,427	13,816	15,625
12	Canada	4,638	12,873	10,759	13,467	19,315	19,785	19,096	17,132	16,744	14,422	13,637	10,955	14,695
13	Philippines*	3,679	17,187	10,826	10,168	16,750	16,709	15,179	16,318	14,281	11,847	10,341	8,331	12,647
14	Cambodia*	5,012	28,342	18,908	15,108	16,536	20,625	15,342	12,180	15,140	7,561	6,908	7,530	5,482
15	Taiwan	1,714	6,956	4,823	4,329	14,005	6,131	5,478	4,771	3,996	5,029	3,346	2,519	2,665
16	Russia	3,144	12,054	8,963	10,986	13,033	12,532	13,340	11,649	8,642	7,019	4,835	2,861	3,206
17	Switzerland	2,921	8,512	9,749	7,956	10,603	9,777	9,064	10,586	10,096	9,710	8,622	5,827	6,526
18	Italy	2,751	7,330	6,198	7,537	10,052	8,990	9,710	8,822	6,289	6,977	7,075	5,481	6,467
19	Singapore*	2,008	11,730	7,692	6,829	8,512	8,258	9,621	9,685	10,545	7,130	6,087	5,286	4,866
20	India	1,743	8,152	4,864	4,343	8,249	5,492	4,547	4,551	3,275	3,227	3,321	2,280	2,652
21	Netherlands	2,287	8,877	7,804	5,500	7,004	8,429	8,683	10,899	9,283	9,164	10,032	8,504	11,315
22	Sweden	1,419	3,475	4,802	3,483	5,795	5,465	5,804	5,194	6,676	5,926	6,261	4,150	6,827
23	Belgium	1,970	6,099	5,322	4,371	5,682	5,289	5,343	6,046	6,284	5,241	5,012	3,868	4,908
24	Spain	1,476	6,157	5,309	4,589	5,461	4,856	5,219	5,127	4,208	4,652	4,195	2,962	3,117
25	Austria	1,250	3,320	3,237	2,874	5,324	3,910	3,835	3,339	2,860	3,801	2,565	2,450	2,843
26	Indonesia*	1,217	5,161	3,487	3,241	5,010	6,019	4,812	4,888	4,256	3,338	2,245	3,158	2,043
27	New Zealand	1,226	3,965	3,460	3,202	4,787	4,798	5,200	5,451	5,418	4,885	4,393	3,479	4,364
28	Denmark	1,591	3,134	3,892	3,198	4,479	4,491	5,065	4,586	5,054	4,769	5,359	2,977	3,657
29	Norway	874	2,248	2,913	2,334	4,018	3,499	3,606	3,531	3,307	3,178	2,845	2,221	2,909
30	Myanmar*	1,417	22,524	22,132	2,848	3,695	2,661	2,157	1,947	1,730	1,765	1,652	1,794	1,698
31	Israel	1,664	4,041	2,997	2,128	3,593	4,163	4,068	3,364	3,241	4,232	3,700	2,236	4,090
32	Finland	780	1,719	2,287	2,023	3,218	3,013	3,751	2,735	2,962	2,742	2,470	1,985	2,729
33	Greece	246	586	520	481	593	878	498	433	366	451	578	537	569
34	Brunei*	103	389	278	342	484	865	564	582	533	354	197	267	338

^{∗}ASEAN nation
