= Economy of Laos =

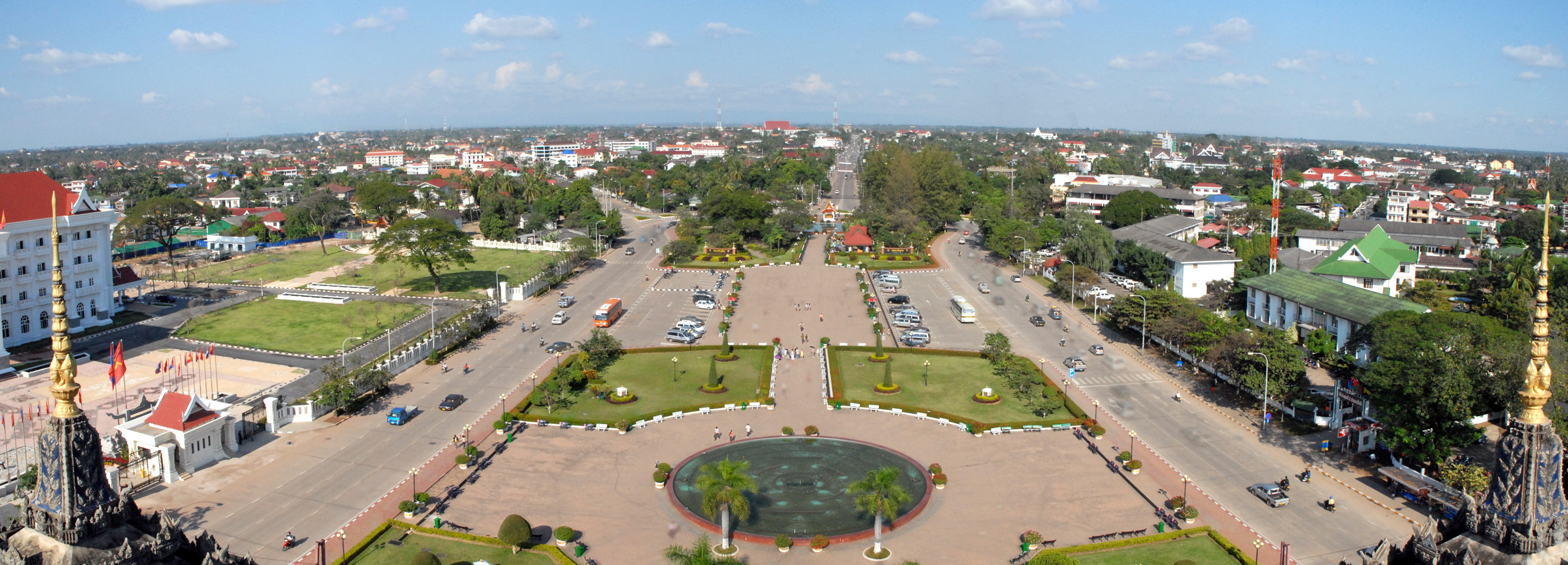
- Vientiane
- Currency: Lao Kip (LAK, ₭)
- Fiscal year: 1 October – 30 September
- Trade organizations: ASEAN; WTO; RCEP; G77
- Country group: Least developed; Lower-middle income economy

Statistics
- Population: ▲7,769,819 (2024)
- GDP: ▲$18.959 billion (nominal, 2026 est.); ▲$95.090 billion (PPP, 2026 est.)
- GDP rank: 135th (nominal, 2026 est.); 109th (PPP, 2026 est.)
- GDP growth: 4.5% (2024); 3.4% (2025)
- GDP per capita: ▲$2,331 (nominal, 2026 est.); ▲$12,054 (PPP, 2026 est.)
- GDP per capita rank: 152nd (nominal, 2026 est.); 127th (PPP, 2026 est.)
- GDP per capita growth: 2.7% (2024)
- GDP by sector: Primary sector: 16.8%; Secondary sector: 29%; Tertiary sector: 43.5%; (2024 est.)
- Inflation (CPI): 40.3% (Jan 2023 est.)
- Population below national poverty line: 18.3% (2018 est.); 15.7% on less than $3.00/day (2018)
- Gini coefficient: 36.4 medium (2012)
- Human Development Index: ▲0.617 medium (2023) (139th); ▲0.462 low IHDI (2023)
- Labor force: ▲3,584,797 (2024); 66% employment rate (2024)
- Labor force by occupation: agriculture: 73.1%; industry: 6.1%; services: 20.6%; (2012 est.)
- Unemployment: 1.2% (2024)
- Main industries: Copper, tin, gold, and gypsum mining; timber, electric power, agricultural processing, rubber construction, garments, cement and tourism

External
- Exports: ▲$9.698 billion (2023 est.)
- Export goods: fertilizers, electricity, garments, paper, gold
- Main export partners: China 39.1%; Thailand 34.3% (2023)
- Imports: ▲$8.596 billion (2023 est.)
- Import goods: refined petroleum, cars, raw sugar, plastic products, trucks
- Main import partners: Thailand 56.3%; China 26.1%; Vietnam 8.1% (2023)
- FDI stock: ▲$15.14 billion (31 December 2012 est.)
- Current account: ▲$404.523 million (2023 est.)
- Gross external debt: ▼$9.619 billion (2023 est)

Public finance
- Government debt: ▲63.6% of GDP (2017 est.)
- Foreign reserves: ▲$1.27 billion (31 December 2017 est.)
- Budget balance: −5.5% (of GDP) (2017 est.)
- Revenue: 2.288 billion (2022 est.)
- Spending: 2.259 billion (2022 est.)
- Economic aid: $0.4 billion (1999 est.)
- All values, unless otherwise stated, are in US dollars.

The economy of Laos is a lower-middle income developing economy. Being a communist state, the Lao economic model bears some resemblance to the Chinese and Vietnamese economies, in that it has implemented market-based economic practices while maintaining a degree of state control and welcoming foreign direct investment.

Following the Civil War, Laos established a Soviet-type planned economy. As part of economic restructuring that aimed to integrate Laos into the globalized world market, the country underwent reforms called the "New Economic Mechanism" in 1986 that decentralized government control and encouraged private enterprise alongside state-owned enterprises. As of 2007, Laos averaged 8% a year in GDP growth. It was forecasted that Laos would sustain at least 7% growth through 2019.

The key goals for the government included pursuing poverty reduction and education for all children, with an initiative to become a "land-linked" country. This was showcased through the construction of the nearly $6 billion higher-speed Boten–Vientiane railway. The country opened a stock exchange, the Lao Securities Exchange, in 2011, and has become a regional player in its role as a hydroelectric power supplier to its neighbors China, Thailand, and Vietnam. The Lao economy relies on foreign direct investment to attract capital from overseas. The long-term goal of the Lao economy, as enshrined in the constitution, is economic development in the direction of socialism.

Laos has hydropower resources; the country has potential for hydro- and solar power. Excess electricity from hydropower is exported to other countries. The country relies on coal in its electricity production.

== History ==
Seizure of power by the Communists resulted in the withdrawal of mainly American external investment, on which the country had become dependent as a result of the destruction of domestic capital during the Indochina Wars.

With the revolutions of 1989 in Eastern Europe and the Soviet Union, in 1991, the PDR Lao government reached an agreement with the World Bank and the International Monetary Fund on reforms. The government agreed to introduce fiscal and monetary reform, promote private enterprise and foreign investment, privatize or close state firms, and strengthen banking. It agreed to maintain a market exchange rate, reduce tariffs, and eliminate unneeded trade regulations. A liberal foreign investment code was enacted. Enforcement of intellectual property rights is governed by 2 Prime Minister's Decrees dating from 1995 and 2002.

The economy continues to be dominated by an agricultural sector operating largely outside the money economy and in which the public sector continues to play a dominant role. A number of private enterprises have been founded in industries such as handicrafts (including the Lao Handicraft Group), beer (notably Beerlao), coffee (the most famous being Dao Coffee) and tourism. With United Nations, Japanese, and German support, a formerly state-controlled chamber of commerce aims to promote private business: the Lao National Chamber of Commerce and Industry and its provincial subdivisions.

A round of state-owned enterprise reform in 2019 aims to ensure that the remaining SOEs become profitable ventures that are efficient and sustainable sources of income for the national treasury. These measures include closing unproductive enterprises, ensure businesses in which the state has investments are reformed into profitable ventures, and reduce corruption. As of 2019, the State-Owned Enterprise Development and Insurance Department of the Lao government has 183 enterprises under its supervision.

Laos faced an economic crisis in 2022. Caused by the COVID-19 pandemic and external debt primarily from China, it escalated into inflation and a debt crisis, bringing the country to the brink of default. A World Bank report finds that the economic instability "largely results from low revenue and accumulated debt. There is moreover a need to improve the efficiency of public expenditure and tackle the potential costs of state-owned enterprises and public-private partnerships." The Lao kip currency value has fallen and inflation remains higher than before the pandemic. The same World Bank report states that "the main factor in the kip's falling value has been the lack of foreign currency available (...) a result of the need to repay large external debts, despite some deferrals, and limited capital inflows." The per capita GDP of Laos has gone down from $2,595 in 2021 to $1,824 in 2023 because of the kip's depreciation.

== Economic sectors ==
=== Agriculture, fishing and forestry ===
In 2012, the Laos government issued a 4-year moratorium for new mining projects. The reasons cited were environmental and social concerns relating to the use of agricultural land.

In 2019 Laos produced:

- 3.4 million tons of rice;
- 3.1 million tons of roots and tubers;
- 2.2 million tons of cassava;
- 1.9 million tons of sugarcane;
- 1.5 million tons of vegetable;
- 1.0 million tons of banana;
- 717 thousand tons of maize;
- 196 thousand tons of watermelon;
- 165 thousand tons of coffee;
- 154 thousand tons of taro;
- 114 thousand tons of sweet potato;
- 56 thousand tons of tobacco;
- 53 thousand tons of peanut;
- 46 thousand tons of orange;
- 43 thousand tons of pineapple;
- 23 thousand tons of papaya;
- 8.6 thousand tons of tea;

In addition to smaller productions of other agricultural products.

=== Mining ===
The mining industry of Laos has foreign direct investments (FDI) which has, since 2003–04, made contributions to the economic condition of Laos. More than 540 mineral deposits of gold, copper, zinc, lead and other minerals have been identified, explored and mined. During 2012, the mining and quarrying sector's contribution to GDP was around 7.0%; during this reporting year the FDI in the mineral sector was of the order of US$662.5 million out of a total trade of $4.7 billion in the country. Laos is a member of the WTO.

=== Foreign Investment and Special Economic Zones ===
As of 2026, Laos has 12 Special Economic Zones (SEZs) on its territory. One of the largest if the Bokeo SEZ, or Golden Triangle Special Economic Zone in Bokeo province.

=== Education ===
In 2005, the literacy rate in Laos was estimated to be 73% (83% male and 63% female).

The Human Rights Measurement Initiative (HRMI) finds that Laos is fulfilling 74.0% of what it should be fulfilling for the right to education based on the country's level of income. HRMI breaks down the right to education by looking at the rights to primary education and secondary education. While taking into consideration Laos' income level, the nation is achieving 84.0% of what should be possible based on its resources (income) for primary education and 64.0% for secondary education.

=== Healthcare ===
Health in Laos refers to the health of the population of Laos. Life expectancy in Laos was estimated at 67.78 years in 2021. Malnutrition, especially in children, is most prevalent in rural areas and among ethnic minorities. Poor sanitation, and tropical diseases including malaria are strains on the population's health.

Lao health has improved in the period since Laos joined the World Health Organization in 1950: in addition to life expectancy increases, malaria deaths and tuberculosis prevalence have decreased and the maternal mortality ratio (MMR) has declined by 75%.

Healthcare in Laos is provided by both the private and public sectors.

=== Tourism ===
As of 2011, tourism was the fastest-growing industry in the Lao economy. The government relaxed entry into Laos for tourism purposes in the 1990s.

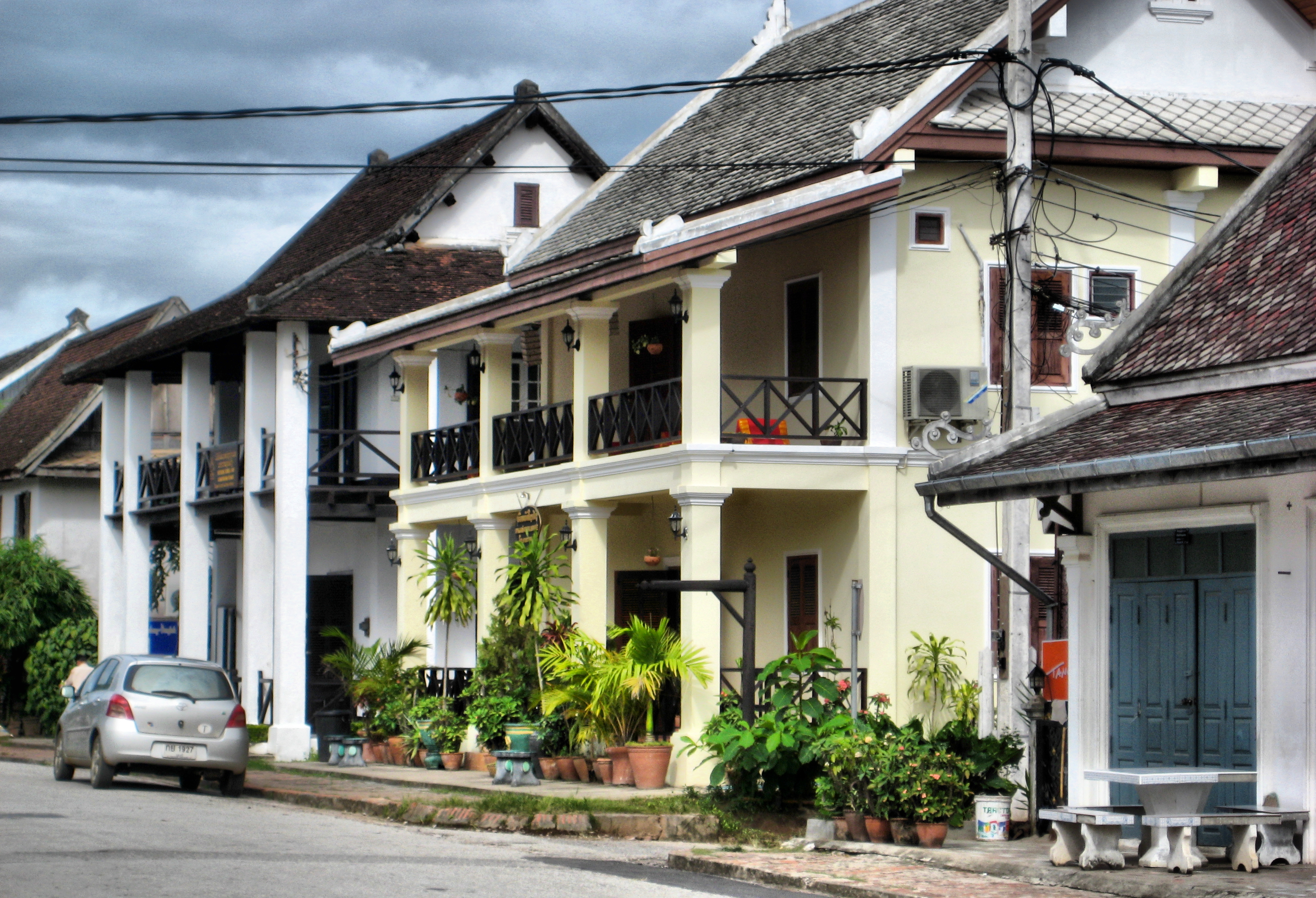
Guest houses in Luang Prabang

Tourism in Laos is a part of the economy of Laos. In 2024, tourist numbers topped 5 million, contributing over US$1 billion to the economy. Tourism is the third largest source of foreign income for the Laos government, behind mining and electricity generation. In 2019, 4.79 million international tourists visited Laos, spending US$931 million, representing 9.1% of the Lao economy, and created employment for 300,000 people.

The top four sources of international tourists in 2019 were Thailand (45%), China (21.3%), Vietnam (19.3%) and South Korea (4.2%).

The Laos-China Railway has facilitated the entry of more tourists, particularly from China, into Laos. The railway opened in 2021, and cross-border service between Laos and China began in 2023. Compared to its neighbour Thailand, Laos is said to be a more difficult country to enter by air, especially via long-haul air routes. In 2024, there were over 46 million airline seats to Thailand, and less than 1.8 million going to Laos. These services typically enter from China or Thailand, meaning visitors may combine their trip with visits to neighbouring countries and not travel only to Laos, due to the need to transit through them to reach Laos.

== Infrastructure ==
=== Energy ===
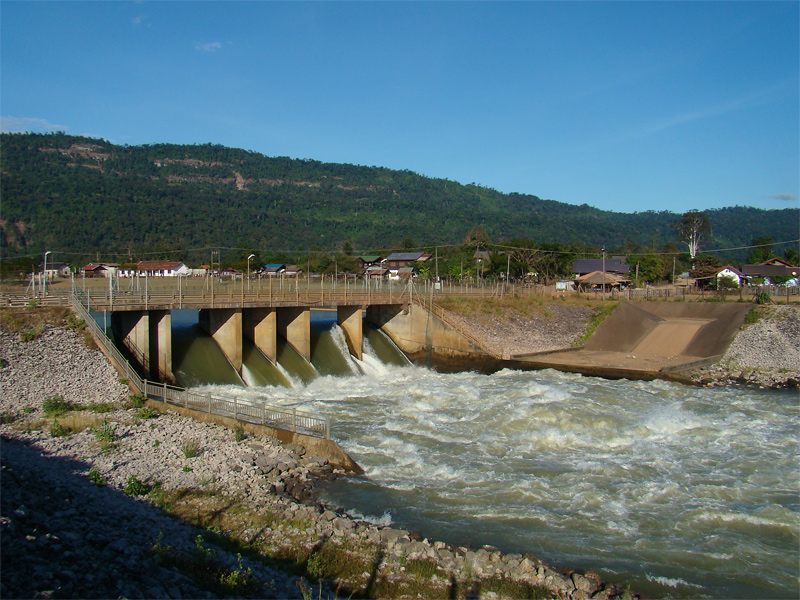
Laos generates most of its electricity from hydropower. This is Theun Hinboun Hydropower station in Khammouane Province

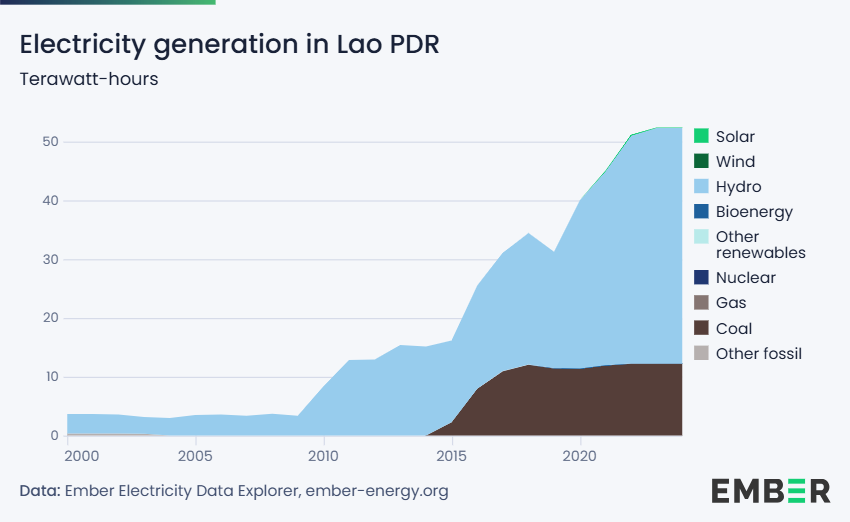
Electricity generation in Laos in terawatt-hours

This page describes energy and electricity production, consumption and export in Laos. In 2023, Laos' energy mix was made up of 38% coal and 34% hydropower, the rest coming from biofuels, oil, or other renewables such as solar energy (although they comprised only 351TJ in 2023, compared to over 155,000TJ for coal energy sources). In terms of electricity generated, 80% comes from hydropower in 2023. 75% of the electricity generated in Laos is exported, which earned the country the name of "battery of Southeast Asia". In 2024, electricity accounted for 15.35% of Laos' total exports, and is mostly exported to China, Vietnam, and Thailand. The state-owned electricity company, Électricité du Laos, sells electricity domestically for less than the cost of production. Due to their growing export market, the Laos energy sector generated 12.8% of the nation's GDP in 2022.

=== Telecommunications ===
Mass media in Laos is based on a network of telephone lines, radiotelephone communications, and mobile phone infrastructure.

After the Lao People's Revolutionary Party seized power in 1975, independent newspapers, radio stations, and printing presses were either closed or brought under party control. The 2008 Media Law of Laos affirms the role of the media as the voice of the party. The lead media organization is Khaosan Pathet Lao (Lao News Agency), whose lead all other news sources are expected to follow.

=== Water supply and sanitation ===
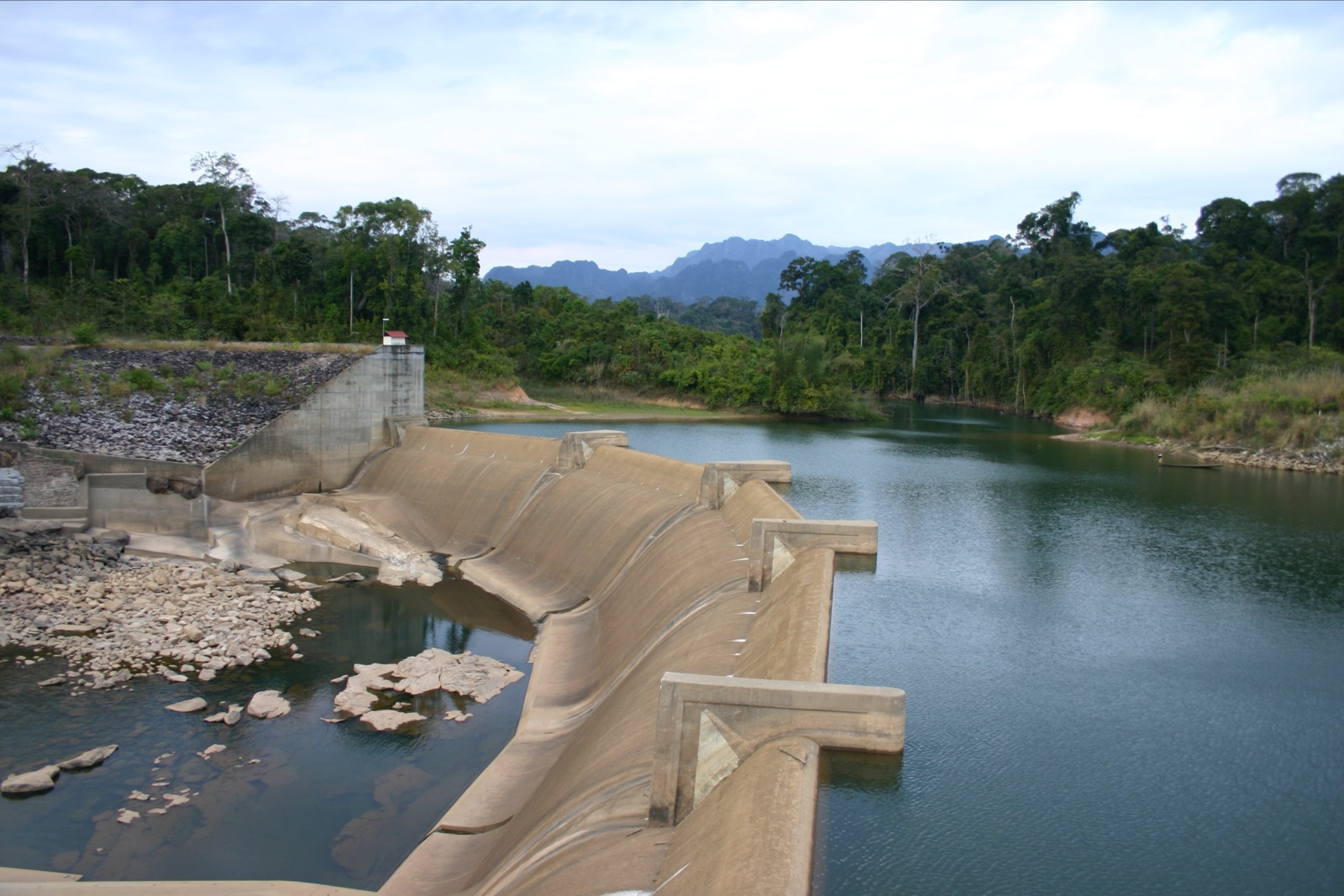
Theun Hinboun Dam Wall. Dams like these provide a renewable energy source for Laos, but can negatively impact the Mekong River ecosystem

Laos is a nation with plentiful surface water and broad rivers, but outside of cities, water sanitation and accessibility infrastructure is sparse. Few improvements have been made since the end of the Laotian Civil War in 1975, especially compared to peer nations such as Thailand. By 2015, 76% of Laotians nationwide were estimated to have access to “improved” water (water not taken directly from natural flows), while 71% were estimated to have access to “improved” sanitation (access to a sewage system more advanced than simple latrines).

National-average numbers for sanitation obscure some important internal variation between urban and rural settings. Most Laotians get their water from surface flows close to their dwellings, so infrastructure is minimal. Outside of the cities, women and small children are often tasked with carrying drinking water by hand from rural collection sites, which impacts educational attainment, economic growth, and rural quality of life.

In the capital, Vientiane, aging sewage systems work poorly and are overdue for infrastructural improvement. Moreover, there is an ongoing gap between rural and town dwellers, with 60% fewer rural people having access to sanitation, and 38% fewer having access to drinking water. An estimated 23% of Laotians nationwide still habitually defecate on open ground, allowing their waste to wash into rivers and canals. This persistent reality affects agriculture and natural ecosystems, as well as human health.

== International trade ==
Exports of Laos by product category (2019) Chemical products Transportation Machines Mineral products Plastics and rubbers Metals Foodstuffs Precious metals Textiles Instruments Animal products Vegetable products Paper goods Footwear and headwear Miscellaneous Stone and glass Wood products Animal and vegetable bi-products Animal hides Arts and antiques Weapons

Laos's principal merchandise exports in 2023 were semi-manufactured non-monetary gold, copper ores and concentrates, non-agglomerated iron ores and concentrates, potassium chloride and cassava. The country exported US$6.0 billion worth of goods, with China, Vietnam, Thailand and Australia as its largest identified export markets.

Merchandise imports amounted to US$7.1 billion in 2023. The largest imported products were refined petroleum products, waste and scrap of unbleached kraft paper and paperboard, non-alcoholic beverages, sugar, and diesel-powered trucks. Thailand, China, Vietnam and the United States were the country's largest identified import partners.

== Other statistics ==
Of the total foreign investment in Laos in 2012, the mining industry got 27% followed by electricity generation which had a 25% share.

The country has (as of 2025) "already begun scaling back supply [of electrical power,] to crypto miners, who currently consume around 150 megawatts of electricity, down 70% from a peak of 500 MW in 2021 and 2022", according to media's paraphrasing of authorities.

== See also ==
- List of companies of Laos
- Ministry of Finance (Laos)
- Ministry of Industry and Commerce (Laos)
- Bank of the Lao P.D.R.
- Corruption in Laos
- New Economic Mechanism (Laos)
- Bamboo network
- Golden Triangle (Southeast Asia)
- ASEAN–China Free Trade Area
- ASEAN Free Trade Area
- Belt and Road Initiative
- Cambodia–Laos–Vietnam Development Triangle Area
- East–West Economic Corridor
- Golden Triangle Special Economic Zone
- Greater Mekong Subregion
- Trade unions in Laos
