= List of airlines of Laos =

This is a list of airlines of Lao People's Democratic Republic.

== Scheduled airlines ==
| Airline | Image | IATA | ICAO | Callsign | Commenced operations | Notes |
|---|---|---|---|---|---|---|
| Lao Airlines | | QV | LAO | LAO | 1976 | Rebranded from Lao Aviation (1976-2003) |
| Lao Skyway | | LK | LLL | LAVIE | 2002 | Rebranded from Lao Air (2002-2014) |
| Lanexang Airways International | | 5A | LXW | Lanexang | 2023 | Rebranded from Lanexang Airways (2023-2024) |

== See also ==
- List of defunct airlines of Laos
- List of airlines
- List of defunct airlines of Asia
