= List of banks in Laos =

This is a list of banks in Laos.

== Central bank ==
- Bank of the Lao P.D.R.

== Commercial banks ==
=== Government-owned banks ===
Name	Abbv.	Established	Capital	Website	Notes
Banque pour le Commerce Exterieur Lao Public	BCEL	2 December 1975	(Laos)	bcel.com.la	
Lao Development Bank	LDB	9 April 2003	(Laos)	ldblao.la	Joint-venture of Chaleun Sekong Group and the Lao government.; Faces an increased risk of sanctions due to the government's status on the FATF Grey List.
Agricultural Promotion Bank	APB	19 June 1993	(Laos)	apb.com.la	
Specialized banks
Nayoby Bank	NBB	15 September 2006	(Laos)	nbb.com.la	
Joint-state banks
Lao-Viet Bank	LVB	22 June 1999	(Laos) - (Vietnam)	laovietbank.com.la	Agreement between BCEL and BIDV
Banque Franco-Lao	BDL	October 2008	(Laos) - (France)	bfl-bred.com	Agreement between BCEL and BRED
Lao China Bank	LCNB	22 January 2014	(Laos) - (China)	lcnb.la	Agreement between BCEL and Fudian Bank

=== Private banks ===
Name	Abbv.	Established	Majority Owner	Capital	Website
Joint Development Bank	JDB	21 January 1989	Simuong Group	(Laos)	jdbbank.com.la
Phongsavanh Bank		29 March 2007	Phongsavanh Group	(Laos)	phongsavanhbank.com
Indochina Bank		6 February 2009	LVMC Holdings	(South Korea)	indochinabank.com
Booyoung Lao Bank		September 2007	Booyoung Group	(South Korea)	booyoungbank.com
Maruhan Japan Bank Lao	MJB	February 2013	Maruhan	(Japan)	maruhanjapanbanklao.com
Bank for Investment and Commerce	BIC	22 June 2017	AIF Group	(Laos)	biclaos.com
ST Bank		3 July 2009	ST Group	(Laos)	stbanklaos.la
Subsidiary banks
ACLEDA Bank Lao		26 December 2007	ACLEDA Bank	(Cambodia)	acledabank.com.la
RHB Bank Lao		6 May 2014	RHB Bank	(Malaysia)	rhbgroup.com/laos
Kasikornthaibank Lao	KBank	14 November 2014	Kasikornbank	(Thailand)	kasikornbank.com.la
Saigon Thuong Tin Bank Lao	Sacombank	12 December 2008	Sacombank	(Vietnam)	sacombank.com.la
VietinBank Lao		27 January 2012	VietinBank	(Vietnam)	vietinbank.com.la
Vietcombank Lao	VCB	19 October 2018	Vietcombank	(Vietnam)	
Canadia Bank Lao		1 September 2009	Canadia Bank	(Cambodia)	canadiabank.com.la
Saigon-Hanoi Bank Lao	SHB	15 January 2016	SHB Bank	(Vietnam)	shb.la

== Defunct bank(s) ==
- Lao Construction Bank (LCB)

== Foreign banks ==
Name	Abbv.	Branch(es)	Capital
Bangkok Bank		Vientiane	(Thailand)
Bangkok Bank		Pakse	(Thailand)
Krungthai Bank	KTB	Vientiane	(Thailand)
Krungthai Bank	KTB	Savannakhet	(Thailand)
Bank of Ayudhya	Krungsri	Vientiane	(Thailand)
TMBThanachart Bank	TTB	Vientiane	(Thailand)
Siam Commercial Bank	SCB	Vientiane	(Thailand)
Public Bank		Vientiane	(Malaysia)
Public Bank		Pakse	(Malaysia)
Public Bank		Savannakhet	(Malaysia)
Military CJS Bank	MB	Vientiane	(Vietnam)
Industrial and Commercial Bank of China	ICBC	Vientiane	(China)
CIMB Thai		Vientiane	(Thailand)
Cathay United Bank	CUBC	Vientiane	(Taiwan)
Bank of China	BOC	Vientiane	(China)
First Commercial Bank	FCB	Vientiane	(Taiwan)
Maybank		Vientiane	(Malaysia)
Australia and New Zealand Banking Group	ANZ	Vientiane	(Australia)
Taiwan Cooperative Bank	TCB	Vientiane	(Taiwan)
