= Lao Federation of Trade Unions =

- ສູນກາງສະຫະພັນກຳມະບານລາວ
- Abbreviation: LFTU
- Founded: 1956; 70 years ago
- Headquarters: Vientiane, Laos
- Location: Laos
- Members: 178,000 (71,000 female) (37% of workforce)
- Key people: Khamla Lolonesy, President
- Affiliations: WFTU
- Website: lftu.gov.la

The Lao Federation of Trade Unions (LFTU; Lao: ສູນກາງສະຫະພັນກຳມະບານລາວ) is the sole trade union federation in Laos. It is directly linked to the Lao People's Revolutionary Party, the ruling political party in Laos, with the salaries of LFTU officers being paid by the government.

The key role of the LFTU is to protect the rights and benefits of workers, to train workers and to contribute to state and social development.

Trade unionism is about union members working together to meet the needs and concerns of workers: to protect their rights and represent their interests.

The objectives of the LFTU are to mobilise solidarity, develop democracy, promote various professions, and work towards social equality.

Its functions include:

- mobilising workers and labourers to become members of a trade union;
- organising workers' training programmes;
- propagating understanding of politics amongst workers;
- encouraging workers' to obey laws and regulations, implement labour contracts, and fulfil their obligations as citizens;
- to develop workers' rights and democracy under the law;
- to protect the legitimate rights and interests of trade unionists, workers and labourers.

The LFTU is affiliated to the World Federation of Trade Unions.
