= Nam Theun =

River in Laos

Coordinates: 18°19′32″N 103°59′52″E

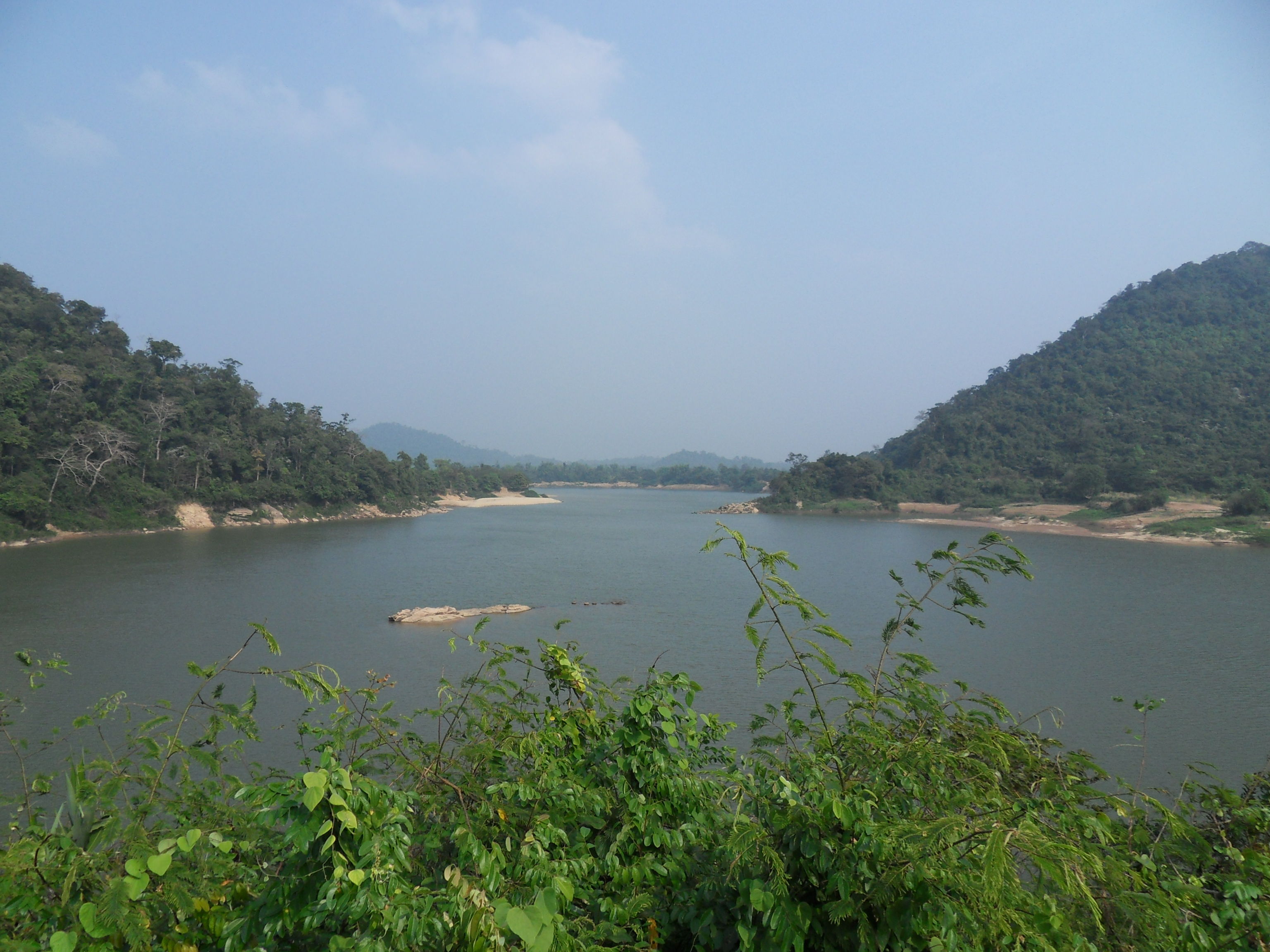
Kadding - The river

Nam Theun (also known as Khading), is a river in Laos, in Khammouane and Bolikhamsai Provinces. Together with its tributaries Nam One, Nam Noy, and Nam Theun it has total length of 138 km (86 mi) (Note: The length of 138 km (86 mi) is only from the mouth in Pakkading District to Nam Theun 2. The actual length should be c. 280 km (170 mi), to the Nakai–Nam Theun NBCA at the border to Vietnam.) and drains an area of 2,800 km^{2} (1,100 sq mi). "Nam Theun" is also three options for large dams on the same river, called Nam Theun 1, Nam Theun 1-2 and Nam Theun 2. Nam Theun 2, which was considered the most economic of the three options, is in operation.

Part of the river corridor is a 62,000 hectare national preserve that is one of the protected areas of Laos.
