= Nam Ngum Dam =

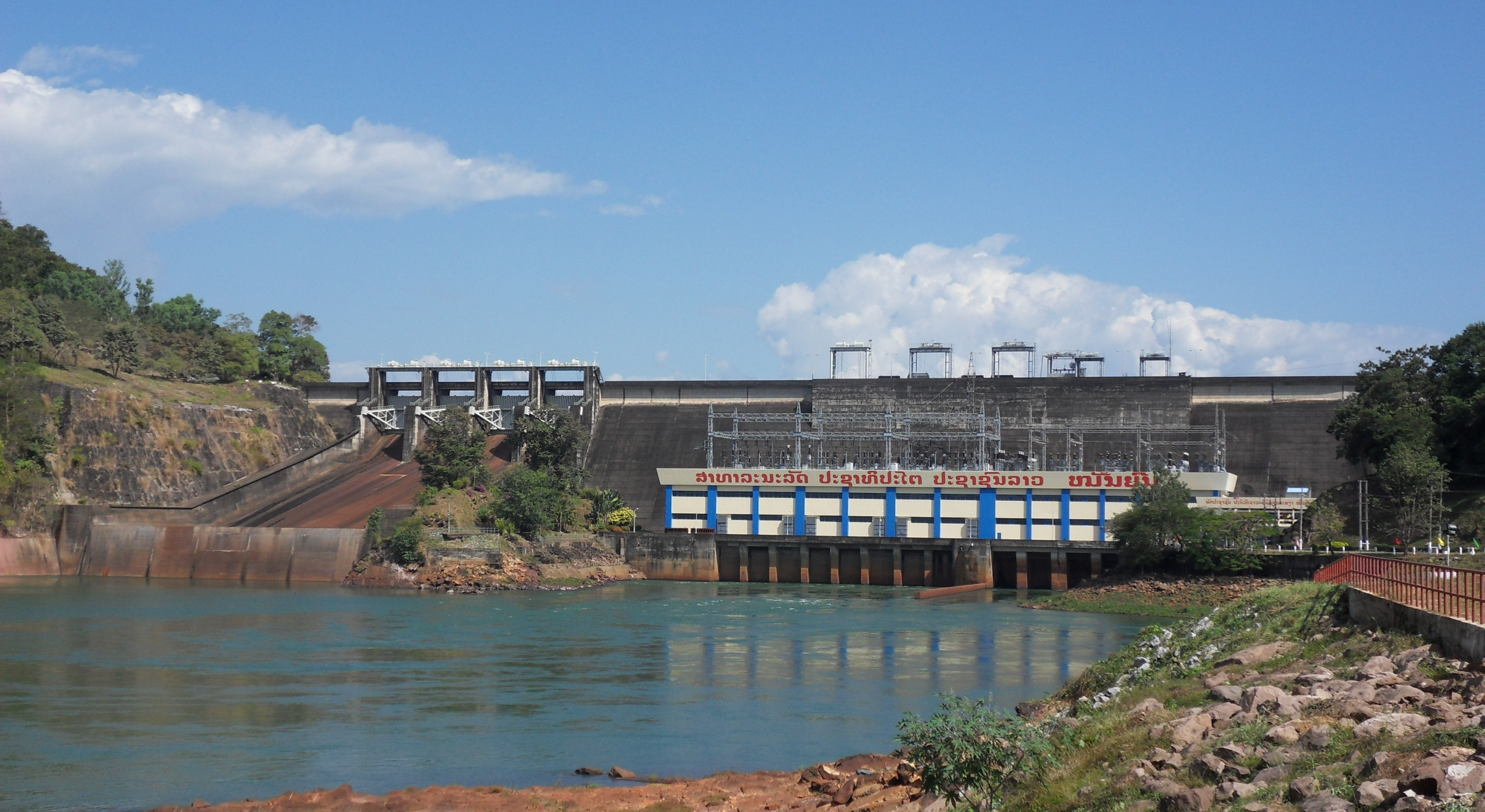

- Location within Laos
- Location: Vientiane Capital, Laos
- Coordinates: 18°31′51″N 102°32′51″E
- Construction began: 1968
- Opening date: 1971
- Construction cost: US$97 million (over three phases)
- Owner: EDL

Dam and spillways
- Type of dam: Gravity dam
- Impounds: Nam Ngum River
- Height: 70 m (230 ft)
- Length: 468 m (1,535 ft)
- Spillway type: Radial

Reservoir
- Creates: Ang Nam Ngum
- Total capacity: 4.7 km^{3} (3,800,000 acre⋅ft)
- Catchment area: 8,460 km^{2} (3,266 mi^{2})
- Surface area: 370 km^{2} (140 mi^{2})

Power Station
- Operator: EDL-GEN
- Commission date: 1971
- Hydraulic head: 45.5 m (149 ft)
- Turbines: 2 x 17.5 MW Francis; 3 x 40 MW Francis
- Installed capacity: 155 MW
- Annual generation: 865 GW

The Nam Ngum Dam is a hydroelectric dam on the Nam Ngum River, a major tributary of the Mekong River in Laos. It was the first hydropower dam built in the Lao PDR.

== Construction ==
The dam was constructed in three stages, beginning in with stage I in 1968 and ending with the completion of stage III in 1984. The Mekong River Commission first implemented the dam project as part of the national development plan. The project was mainly focused on harnessing Lao PDR's hydropower potential, but it has also striven to achieve flood protection, implement lift irrigation, facilitate lake fisheries, and develop Lao PDR's tourism industry. The Nam Ngum Dam has a capacity of 155 MW and generates most of Laos's electricity, including all the power used in the capital, Vientiane. Additionally 70–80 percent of electricity created by the dam is exported to Thailand. The revenue from export accounts for about a quarter of Laos's foreign exchange earnings. The gross power revenues of the dam are approximately US$36 million annually. Recent studies have indicated that the dam has adversely affected lake fishery and the Nam Ngum River ecosystem. Responsibility for operation of the project rests with the national power utility Electricité du Laos, a state enterprise under the Ministry of Industry and Handicraft.

Today, the Lao PDR's hydropower potential is widely recognized as one of the country's main resources, since it enjoys a strategic location between the booming economies of China, Vietnam, and Thailand and rivers that contribute 35 percent of Mekong flows. The Lao PDR has an estimated potential of some 18,000 MW from over 60 project sites on the tributaries of the Mekong River, of which less than 3 percent has been developed.

== Location ==
The Nam Ngum River originates in Phou Kout in the northeastern part of the Tran Ninh Plateau, through which the river flows southwestward, and discharges into the Mekong River 55 kilometers east of Vientiane. Covering seven percent of the nation's land area, the Nam Ngum basin is home to roughly 500,000 people, representing approximately nine percent of the Lao PDR's population. The length of the river is 420 kilometers. The Nam Ngum project is 60 kilometers north of Vientiane on the Nam Ngum tributary of the Mekong, within the Vientiane Capital Province. The Nam Ngum catchment covers 8,460 km^{2} (3,266 mi^{2}), and is on track to becoming one of the most heavily dammed catchments in Laos, with six additional dams at various stages of planning and construction, and two water diversions.

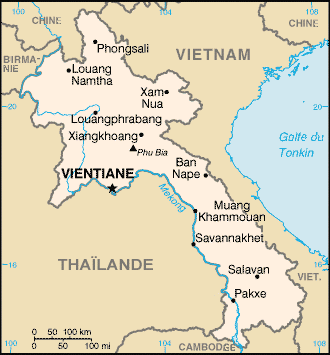
Laos

== History ==
During the 1960s, power production in the Kingdom of Laos was not sufficient to meet national needs. The government had attempted to meet power requirements through small local developments and power loans from Thailand. A feasibility study presented in December 1962 was the first detailed plan outlining the Nam Ngum 1 project. The study explained how the proposed dam could contribute to hydropower generation, flood control, and irrigation. The project was well received by the Lao government and many international organizations, and the plan for construction was finalized in 1968. Three distinct feasibility studies were conducted to outline each stage of the project, and three distinct funds were established to fund all three stages of the Nam Ngum 1 project. Ten countries gave financial aid to pay for its construction. These funds were collected, overseen, and administered by the United Nations and The World Bank. The total cost of the Nam Ngum Dam was US$97 million.

=== Construction of the Nam Ngum 1 (NN1) Dam ===
==== First stage funding (1966) ====
In 1966 Japan, The United States, the World Bank and the United Nations established the NN1 Fund to finance the first stage of the project.

==== Planning of Stage I (1968) ====
In 1968 the Mekong Commission completed their design for Stage I of the NN1 project.

==== Stage 1 of NN1 project (1968–1971) ====
The first stage of the project was implemented in by the Mekong-Commission as part of the 1968–1974 Lao Development Plan. Construction began in 1968 and completed in 1971. During the Stage I the dam was given a full supply level of 202.5 elevation, two 15 MW turbine-generator units, and intakes for units 3, 4, and 5. The total cost of Stage I was US$28 million.

==== Planning of Stage II (1973) ====
In 1973 the government of Laos issued a feasibility study in order to fully plan of the NN1 project Stage II.

==== Stage II funding (1974) ====
In 1974 Laos established the Stage II fund with the help of the World Bank, the United Nations, and the Asian Development Bank.

==== Stage II of the NN1 project (1976–1980) ====
Stage II was undertaken from 1976 and completed in 1980. During stage II four spillway gates were installed, the full supply level was raised to 212 m elevation, and two 40 MW turbine-generator units were added to the power output. The total cost of Stage II was US$49 million.

==== Fishery Development (1978) ====
After completion of Stage II in 1978 the government of the Lao PDR realized that it had neglected to account for how the dam would affect the Nam Ngum river ecosystem, and the hundreds of thousands of people who relied on fishing for subsistence. As a response to this issue fishery development projects were contributed by Netherlands and Switzerland. This included the construction of primary schools and water supply networks as well as the provision of gill nets and boat engines to selected villages. These projects were intended to facilitate fishery employment in Nam Ngum 1 reservoir. This project facilitated the movement of tens of thousands of local fisherman to the banks of the Nam Ngum reservoir throughout the 1980s and 1990s.

==== Funding of Stage III (1976) ====
In 1976 the government established the NN1 Stage III Fund with the help of Japan, the United States, and the Asian Development Bank.

==== Planning of Stage III (1980) ====
In 1980 the government of the Lao PDR issued a feasibility study to plan Stage III of the NN1 project.

==== Stage III of the NN1 project (1983–1984) ====
Stage III began in 1983 and was completed in 1984. During this final stage a third 40 MW turbine-generator unit was added to the dam. The total cost of Stage III was US$20 million.

== Description of the Nam Ngum 1 project ==
=== Nam Ngum Dam ===
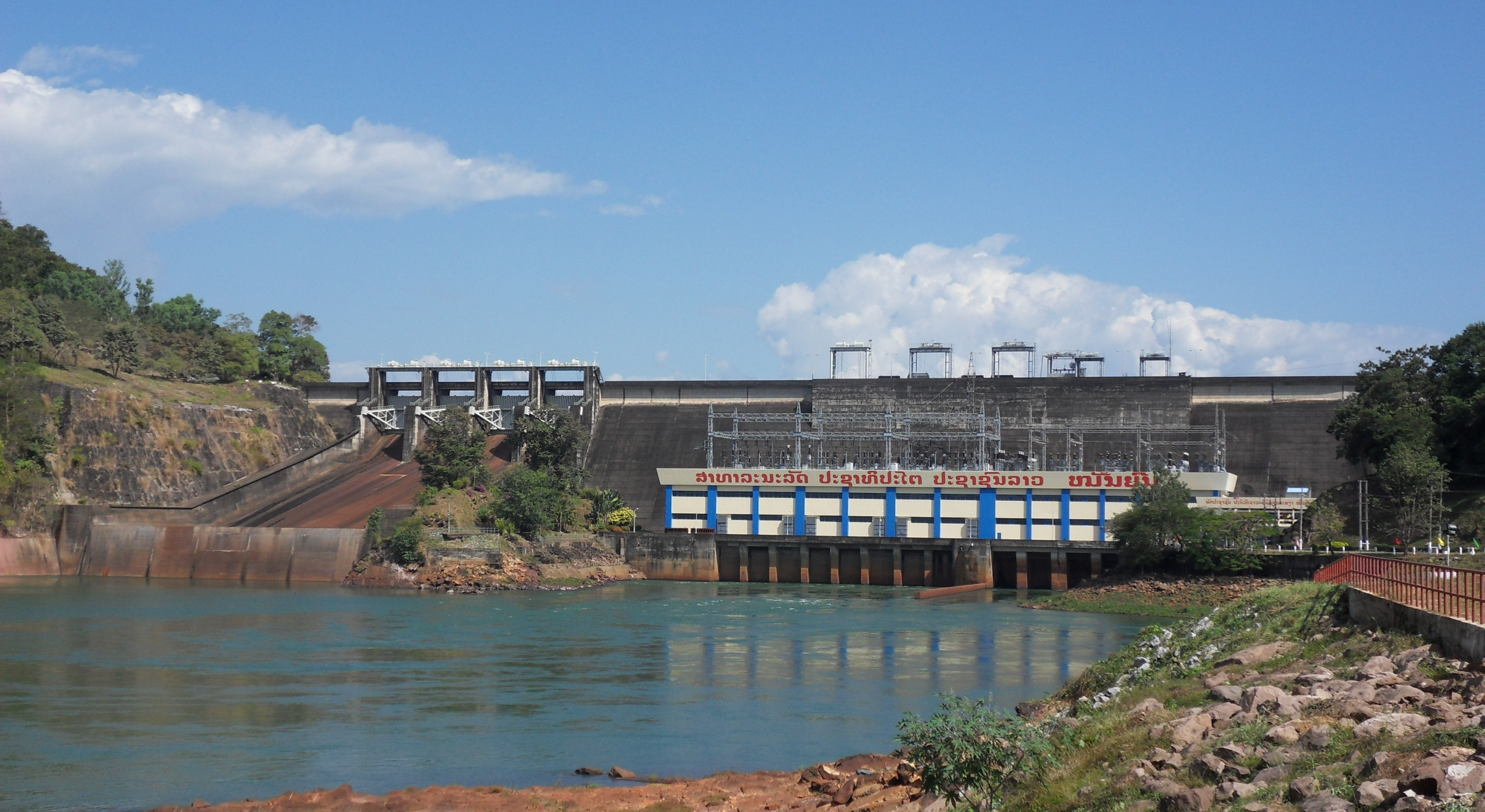

Nam Ngum 1 is a gravity concrete dam with a power station at the base of the dam. Currently the Ngum Nam has a total output capacity of 150 megawatts. Nam Ngum 1 is approximately 75 meters tall, with a total area of 400 km^{2}. The effective storage capacity of the dam is 4,700 x 106 m^{3}.

=== Nam Ngum Reservoir ===
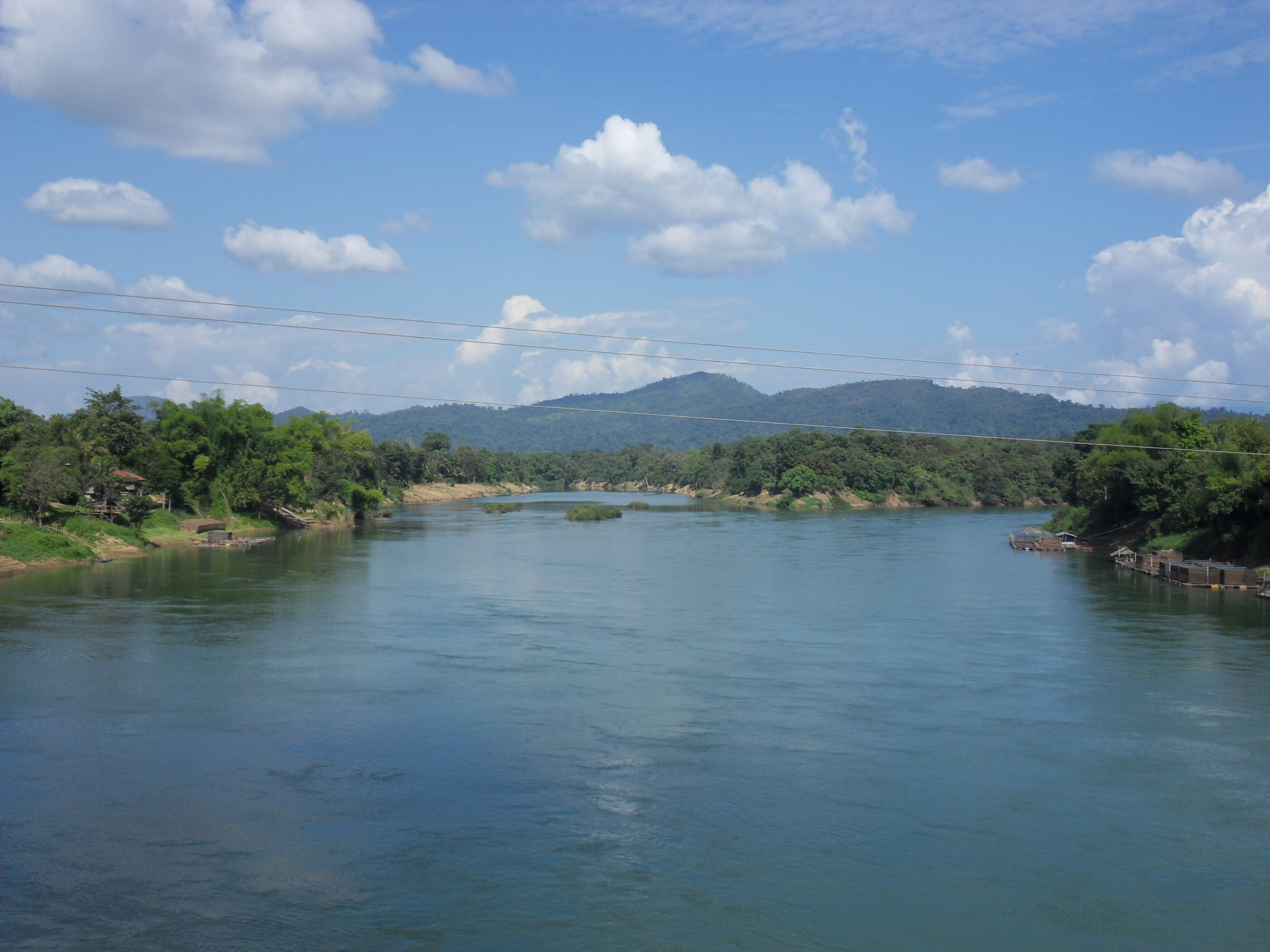
Nam Ngum+Nam Lik

The Nam Ngum reservoir is the largest body of water in the Lao PDR. The dam also serves as major river regulation infrastructure in the basin and its maximum storage is approximately 8.5 billion m^{3}, with a reservoir surface area of 370 km^{2}, and an available depth of 16 m. In 1996 a diversion from the Nam Song River directly into the Nam Ngam 1 reservoir was completed. The diversion transfers 400 m^{3}/second to increasing hydropower generation.

== Ecological Impacts of the Nam Ngum Dam ==
As rapid economic development continues in Southeast Asia and the lower Mekong basin, demands for both food and energy will continue to rise. The Lao government is also keen to utilize its water resources to pursue irrigation expansion and more hydropower projects. This development is seen as critically important for meeting current and future energy demand in the rapidly growing cities and towns throughout the lower Mekong in Thailand, Vietnam, and Laos. With these rising demands come the challenges of regional management of water resources and increased pressure upon surrounding ecosystems. Within this context, the implications of the Nam Ngam Dam, and other projects like it, are a matter of some controversy. Whether or not hydropower-based economic development is consistent with other socioeconomic and environmental objectives in the Lao PDR (irrigation, fisheries, flood control) has scarcely been explored.

Determining the viability of the dual strategy of irrigation and hydropower expansion requires careful analysis to understand whether the water needed for energy generation objectives could be balanced with the water that would be required for additional irrigation development. The issue is that the dam projects in the Nam Ngum are often independently planned and managed, with only minimal consideration of their cumulative and basin-wide economic and hydrological impacts. The lack of coordination is evident in recent controversies and observed flood damages from poorly managed water releases during high flow events. This is in part due to an insufficient valuation of the country's vast water resources. Revenues from electricity generation at individual dams sometimes overshadow potential trade-offs with other important economic sectors like agriculture and aquaculture, or with the nonmarket value generated by subsistence fisheries and other hydrological services.

Fishing in particular is extremely important to the local economy. Fishing provides the primary source of meat for these villagers, with fish contributing 56.3 percent of protein to the local diet. The average household consumes 83.2 kg fish protein each year compared to the Laos national average of 8–10 kg /year. Among these households, 50 percent supplement family income by selling fish to traders in their villages. In total villagers harvest more than 55 indigenous species from in the Nam Ngum reservoir annually. In recent years the excess harvesting of the Nam Ngum reservoir has greatly reduced the biodiversity of the reservoir, and made fishing more difficult. Many ecologists have criticized the Lao PDR for failing to effectively manage reservoir fishing. Annual fish production in the reservoir from 1979 to 1983 was estimated at 1,472 tons or 37 kg /ha. Since then, harvest rates and productivity have decreased substantially to about 20 kg/ha by 1988, resulting in a total estimated fish production of some 740 tonnes per year. Considering that reliable fish catch assessments are extremely difficult the actual situation may be even worse. Nonetheless, the catch statistics available indicate that the reservoir fishery has progressively shifted from the large-bodied top-predators to small-bodied, low-value planktivores. This trend of fishing down food webs is common in fisheries. The data available evidences the trend of individual fishers experience more total catches, but lesser returns from the small fish harvested. Many researchers examining the problem have suggested giving local villages more control over the regulation of fishing in the reservoir, to facilitate more sustainable fishing practices.

Some reports have also found that the Nam Ngum dam has adversely affected aquatic life downstream. Careful analysis has revealed that water released from the Nam Ngum reservoir has different quality as compared to the water in undammed natural rivers. Specifically the dissolved oxygen levels in the water released from the reservoir are unfavorable for aquatic life most of the year, especially during the wet season. Similarly some reporters have noted an unsafe level of hydrogen sulfide. The dam also actively blocks migration by upland fish into the downstream part of the river, which secludes these fish from active spawning sights. These deteriorations in the water quality and biodiversity of Nam Ngum river, pose a significant risk to the overall river ecosystem.

The Nam Ngum 1 heavily influences local agriculture irrigation. According to the 2005 national census, subsistence-based agriculture is the main form of livelihood generation for the majority of citizens, and 75 percent of the population in basin provinces report agriculture as their primary form of employment. Some government officials and academics have raised concerns about if the water required for hydropower generation could co-exist with the water being used for irrigation expansion. A study from Duke recently used the Nam Ngum dam as a case study to model the effects of current and expanded hydropower usage on the river. The study determined that if high-levels of water availability continue tradeoffs between agricultural and hydropower goals will be modest because with high-levels of water irrigation expansion will not significantly effect hydropower generation or vice versa. However, the study did find that under dry conditions the tradeoff between expanded irrigation and hydropower increases. The study determined that continued hydropower generation and hydropower expansion could become exceedingly difficult in such conditions. This is because future returns from Nam Ngum dam and expanded agriculture are largely dependent on high levels of rainfall and water levels. Accordingly, the expected future economic returns from the Nam Ngum dam as well as agriculture expansion in the Vientiane province would be severely decreased in dry conditions. As a result of the potential impact of dry conditions, there is widespread uncertainty about the future of Nam Ngum 1 and further hydropower project on the Nam Ngum. Some scholars have become concerned that climate change may lead to decreased levels of rainfall. As with fishing in the reservoir, the government of the Lao PDR will likely have to take steps to address hydrology issues in the future.
