= Lao Central Airlines =

Laotian airline 2010–2014

Coordinates: 17°58′10.9″N 102°34′38.8″E

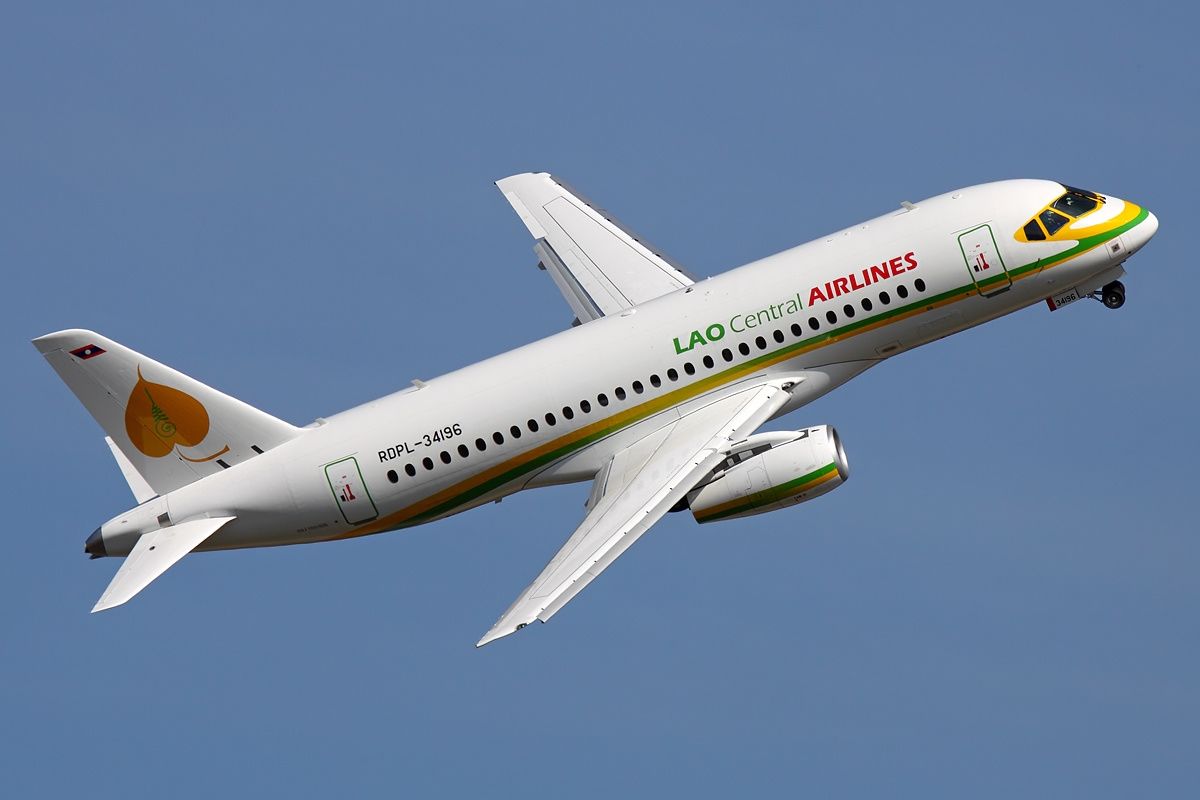
- Sukhoi Superjet 100-95 (RDPL-34196)
IATA	ICAO	Call sign
LF	LCI	NAKLAO
- Founded: 2010
- Ceased operations: 2014
- Hubs: Wattay International Airport
- Fleet size: 3
- Destinations: 8
- Parent company: Phongsavanh Group
- Headquarters: Vientiane, Laos
- Website: http://www.flylaocentral.com

Lao Central Airlines Public Company, operating as Lao Central Airlines, was an airline in Laos with its head office in Wattayyaithong Village, Sikhottabong District, Vientiane. The airline was founded in 2010, and ceased operations in 2014.

It was the first private airline in Laos and offered premium and budget seats. The name change from Phongsavanh Airlines to Lao Central Airlines was meant to raise awareness for the airline as Lao-owned in international market. The airline is owned by the Phongsavanh group, a Lao company engaged in international trading, timber, hospitality, telecommunications, banking, and security products and services. The airline hired PricewaterhouseCoopers for management consultancy services to ensure adherence to international aviation standards. The airline was the second biggest among Lao airline operators in terms of fleet size.

== History ==
=== Phongsavanh Airlines ===
Lao Capricorn Air Company was sold to Phongsavanh Airlines Public Company headed by Lao magnate Od Phongsavanh, which effectively took control of the airline in January 2010. After the takeover, the airline's name was changed to Phongsavanh Airlines to align with Phongsavanh Bank and became part of the Phongsavanh Group of Companies.

=== Lao Central Airlines ===
In 2012, Phongsavanh Airlines was rebranded as Lao Central Airlines.

=== Suspension of services and future of airline ===
Lao Central Airlines cancelled its Bangkok services in December 2013 due to the political unrest in Bangkok, and Luang Prabang services were suspended in July 2014 to allow for restructuring.

The airline announced it would be resuming flights mid 2015 under a new owner, however, in December 2014 it was announced that the two Sukhoi SSJ 100 made for Lao Central Airlines were to be transferred to the Russian Federation Presidential Office putting in doubt the ability of the company to resume services.

As of October 2016, there has still be no announcement on if and when services will resume.

== Ownership ==
The airline was owned by Od Phongsavanh, the owner of Phongsavanh Bank, a private bank in Laos.

== Destinations ==
Previously Lao Central Airlines flew to the following locations:

=== Laos ===
- Vientiane — Base
- Luang Prabang — Branch Office

=== Thailand ===
- Bangkok

Lao Central Airlines previously announced that it will service the following destinations once it resumes operations in mid 2015; to Luang Prabang (Laos), Bangkok, Hanoi (Vietnam), Phnom Penh (Cambodia), Naypyidaw (Myanmar), Kuala Lumpur (Malaysia) and other cities.

== Fleet ==
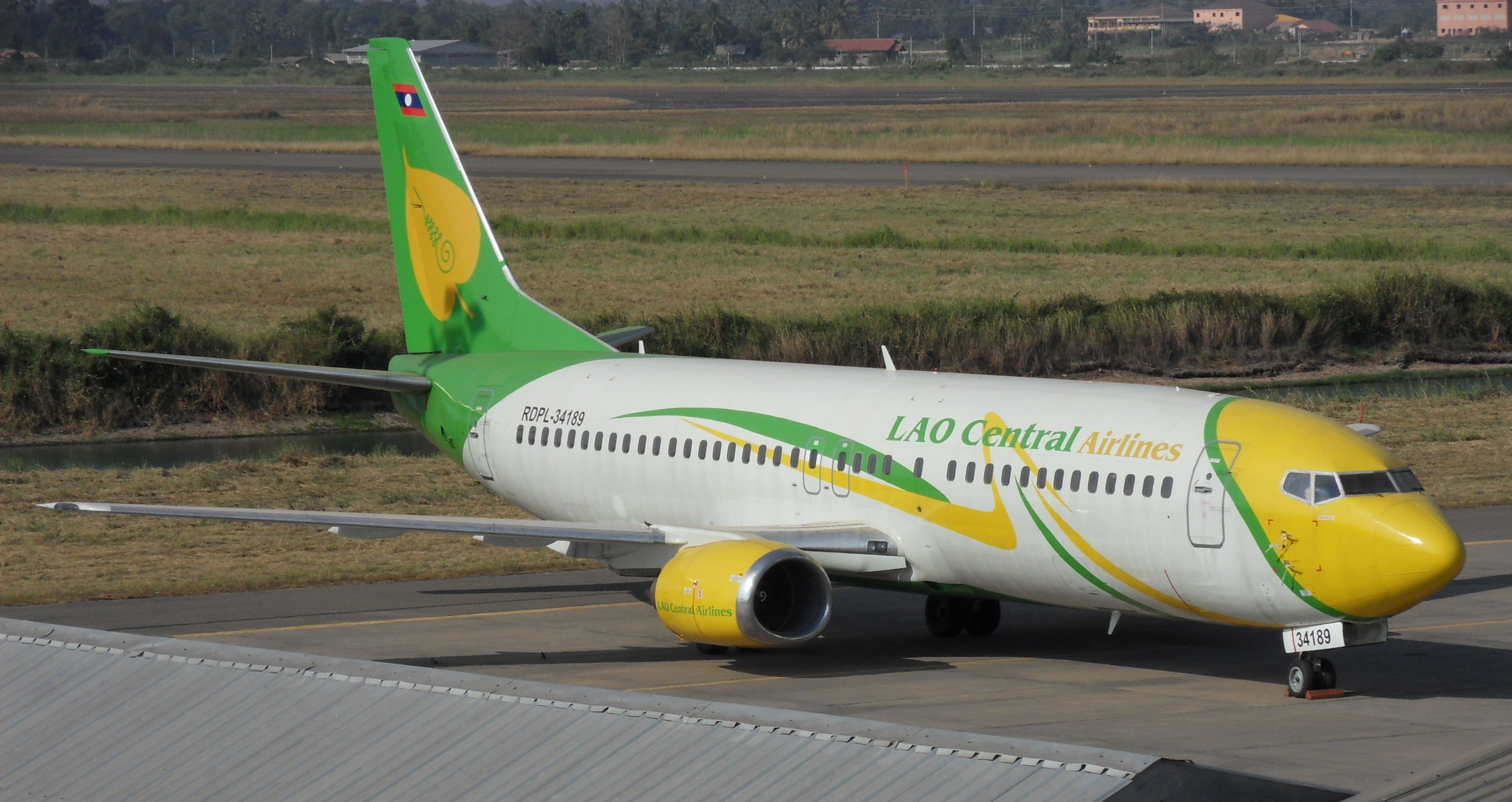
Lao Central Airlines Boeing 737-400 at Vientiane Airport

This is a list of Lao Central Airlines fleet when it was active.

Lao Central Airlines fleet
Aircraft	Total	Orders	Passengers					
Aircraft	Total	Orders	C	Y	Total			
Boeing 737-400	2	0	0	168	168			
Sukhoi Superjet 100	1	2	8	85	93	Total	3	0
