= Nam Theun 2 Power Company =

Company of Laos

Nam Theun 2 Power Company Limited (NTPC) is the entity set up to build and operate the Nam Theun 2 Hydropower Project in Khaommouane Province in Laos. Its headquarters operates out of Vientiane, Laos, while its activities are situated in Khaommouane Province. The company manages 1080 MW of power, which is distributed for the Lao national grid or exported to Thailand.

== History ==
In the 1970s, the potential for a hydropower project was realized in the Nakai Basin. In the following decades, studies were conducted to determine the feasibility of such a development in the area. In 1993, after feasibility studies proved successful, the Thai and Lao governments signed a memorandum of understanding to export 1,500 MW of power to Thailand. In 1995, the Nam Theun Electricity Consortium (NTEC), now known as the Nam Theun 2 Power Company (NTPC), approached the World Bank for assistance with project risk mitigation. The 1997 Asian financial crisis delayed the development of NT2, but by 2002 the NTPC was incorporated in Laos and a Concession Agreement was signed between the Government of Laos and the NTPC. After trials of village resettlement, environmental and social safeguards documents were finalized, and the financial closure was completed, construction began in 2005. Construction was finished in 2010 and the NTPC’s operations were in full swing.

In the context of the project history above, NTPC came into formation as a group of developers under the name Nam Theun Electricity Consortium. When the French company, Electricite du France, joined the consortium, the group was then renamed the NTPC and thus overtook operations.

== Environmental and Social Responsibility ==
“Our mission is to generate electricity in a reliable and sustainable manner, contribute to the development of the Lao PDR and be a reference in the hydro industry.”

The mission of the company in managing the NT2 Dam expands past operations of the hydropower plant, but also investments in the surrounding communities. NTPC worked to resettle the 16 villages of the Nakai district. New settlements include improved roads and infrastructure, clear boundaries, clean water, and resources for agriculture. Education was another priority of resettlement projects, and each village was equipped with primary schools and kindergartens. From the project website, the company built:

- 1330 houses with toilets, electricity, and rainwater collection systems
- 270 kilometers of all-season access roads built or upgraded
- 104 community buildings
- 330 water pumps
- 17 primary and 16 nursery schools
- 2 health centers and an upgraded district hospital

With these new resources, education has increased greatly. The company website presents 94% and 31% enrollment rates in primary and secondary school, respectively, compared to previous years (but no indication as to what years the figures were taken from). Adult literacy in the region is 86%, which is above the national average of 69-77%. Health outcomes are also improving in these villages, with a child mortality of 50 in 1000, lower than the national average of 79 in 1000. Overall, the company states that 98% of villagers believe their lives are better than what they were before the development of Nam Theun 2, implying an improvement in quality of life.

Resettlement in the villages surrounding Nam Theun 2 is being conducted through a comprehensive action plan in two phases during the concession period (2010–2035): a Resettlement Implemented Phase (RIP) to be in play until December 21, 2017 and a Medium-Term Development Plan (MTDP) until the end of the concession period. This plan was created by a joint working group composed of representatives from the Government of Laos, NTPC, and other entities involved in the development of NTP2 (World Bank, Asian Development Bank, etc.).

Seven objectives were laid out for different action areas during the RIP phase, aimed towards an end goal of sustainable livelihoods:

- Fisheries: Protect and manage habitat for basis of sustainable income generation.
- Forestry: Manage forest resources according to community priorities.
- Off-farm income (eg. tourism, handicraft production): Enhance non-farming livelihood activities accessible to communities.
- Agriculture and livestock: Mobilize long-term program under the District Agriculture and Forestry Office
- Gender: Mainstream gender in all livelihood areas
- Poor and vulnerable households: Support vulnerable, poor and other high risk households
- Ethnic groups: Facilitate full and effective participation in political, economic, and public life

The second part, the MTDP, is aimed to support sustainable livelihoods in resettled communities long-term, past the RIP phase. Financially supported by the Nam Theun 2 Development Fund, the MTDP includes the Nakai Plateau Livestock Agriculture, Livestock, and Fisheries project (NP-LAF). NP-LAF Project will support the agricultural, livestock, and fishing activities of the local communities and the efforts of district/provincial governments to develop programs that upkeep sustainable incomes through agriculture and fishing.

The company’s activities are also geared towards promoting sustainable development, following within the safeguards of the World Bank and Asian Development Bank. In order to do so, ‘eco-zones’ were established during the development of the dam which allotted certain areas for human use and others for preservation. One of these such conservation zones is the Nakai Nam Theun National Park, home to a vast and biodiverse array of flora and fauna. In addition to preserving the natural areas surrounding Nam Theun 2, NTPC is involved in conservation work of the Chinese swamp cypress (Glyptostrobus pensilis), an endangered tree native to the area.

Within the Nam Theun 2 Reservoir itself, NTPC is committed to monitoring water quality, greenhouse gas emissions, and aquatic life in the reservoir. From the website, “Nam Theun 2 provides in-house expertise on water chemistry, hydrobiology, greenhouse gas emission and wildlife in relation to the Nam Theun 2 hydro system.”

== Ownership and Financial Structure ==
According to the Nam Theun 2 Project website, shareholding of the company is divided as the following:

- EDF Nam Theun Holding (EDF-NTH) - 40%
  - “EDF Nam Theun Holding (EDF-NTH) is a subsidiary of EDF S.A. An energy market leader in Europe, EDF S.A is an integrated energy company operating in all branches of the industry: generation, transmission, distribution and the trading and sale of energy.”
- Electricity Generating Public Company Limited (EGCO) - 35%
  - “The first independent power producer in Thailand, EGCO was created to acquire some assets of Electricity Generating Authority of Thailand (EGAT) and to supply generating capacity and electrical energy to EGAT under long-term power purchase agreements”
- Lao Holding State Enterprise (LHSE) - 25%
  - “Lao Holding State Enterprise is a state-owned company, established in February 2005 to hold the Lao Government’s shares in NT2”

The partners of NPTC make contributions to the project in proportion to their equity. Equity financing for the project totals $350 million USD, 28% of the $1.45 billion USD in funding for Nam Theun 2. Of the 28%, 60% is accounted for by public sector investors, namely through LHSE and EDF-NTH which are both government-owned enterprises.

Government of Laos-

The Nam Theun Electricity Consortium signed an agreement with the Government of Laos in 1993 in order to begin development of the hydropower project. In 2002, concession agreements were signed between the Lao government and the now-NTPC to operate the project under a build-operate-transfer model. In 2035, 25 years after operations started, Nam Theun 2 will transfer management fully from the NTPC to the Government of Laos.

The Government of Laos’ equity component is $87.5 million USD, which is being funded through grants and loans provided by various international financial institutions.

== Economic impact ==
From initiation in 2010 to December 2016, the NT2 project generated $153 million in revenue for the government of Laos. Legal agreements of the project allocated this income towards efforts to reduce poverty and manage the environment. According to the 2019 World Bank Nam Theun 2 Project Overview, 39% of these funds went to education and 14% to health, the two biggest sectors to receive funding. Other portions of the revenue went towards road construction and maintenance, as well as rural electrification.

NT2 required the resettlement of 6,300 families, and the infrastructure provided by the project have integrated these communities into the economic activity of Laos. Livelihoods of these villagers are now situated in fisheries, agriculture, forestry, and other small enterprises– all of which have increased incomes and, as previously mentioned, living conditions. 97% of families doubled their monetary incomes, and 99.6% of families report having monetary savings, up from 21% in 2006.

== Recent Achievements ==
On September 11, 2024, Nam Theun 2 Power Company was recognized at the 5th ASEAN Occupational Safety and Health Network (OSHNET) Awards in Singapore, held in concurrence with the 11th ASEAN OSHNET Conference. Nominated by the Ministry of Labor and Social Welfare on behalf of the Lao government, the company was commended for its “robust safety culture and outstanding performance.”
