= Électricité du Laos =

Laotian electricity company

- Type: Public
- Industry: Energy
- Headquarters: Vientiane, Laos
- Key people: Dr. Akhomdeth Vongsay
- Subsidiaries: EDL - Generation Company
- Website: http://www.edl.com.la/

Électricité du Laos (EDL; Lao: ໄຟຟ້າລາວ) is the state corporation of Laos that owns and operates the country's electricity generation, electricity transmission and electricity distribution assets. The company also manages the import and export of electricity from the national electricity grid of the country. EDL was founded in 1959 and is headquartered in Vientiane.

In July 2010, the International Finance Corporation loaned $15 million to Electricite du Laos for the expansion of electricity networks and substations in rural areas of Laos. The company has also received debt financing from the Asian Development Bank.

By 2020, the government expects to provide electricity to 90 percent of Lao households.

In September 2020, Reuters reported that the Électricité du Laos and the China Southern Power Grid Company (CSPGC) established the joint venture Electricite du Laos Transmission Company Ltd (EDLT) that has control of the country's power grid, as well as the rights to purchase and sell power in Laos to stave off a debt default to the Chinese government. The CSPGC owns a majority share of the EDLT, but the Lao and Chinese governments have made a written agreement in which the Lao government will gradually buy Chinese shares back. An official from the Laos Ministry of Energy and Mines reasoned that "The new company will connect the (EDL and China Southern) power grids together. It’s all about capital. It is necessary to join the two grids".

== EDL-Generation Company ==
EDL logo.

EDL-Generation Company Limited (EDL-Gen) was incorporated in 2010 and operates as a subsidiary of Electricite Du Laos. Laos is the only net electricity exporter in the Mekong Region and has been nicknamed the "Battery of Asia", selling power to Thailand, Vietnam, Cambodia, and China. EDL-Gen planned to double its hydropower generation capacity by 2016, and currently operates seven plants totalling 387 MW:

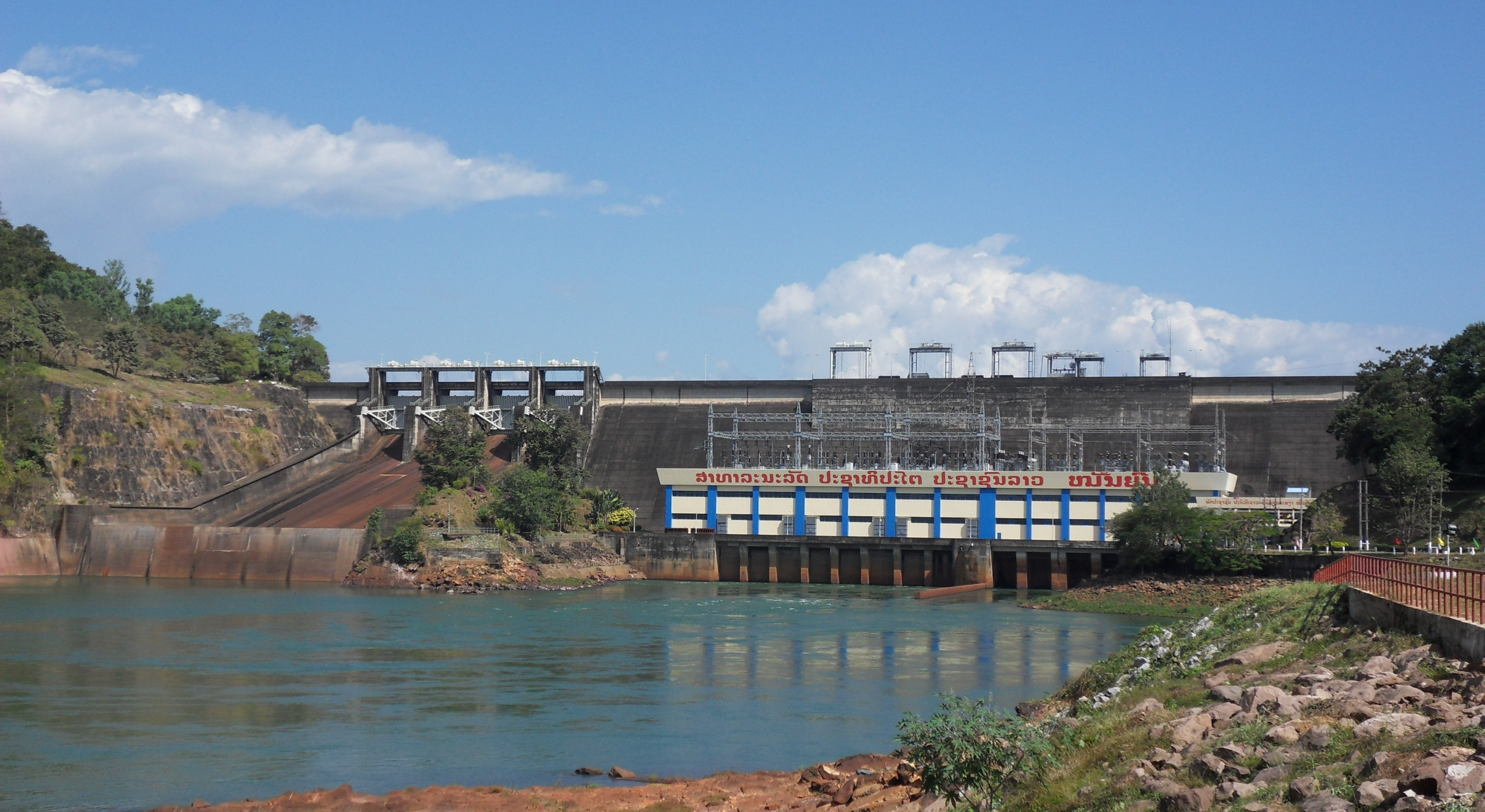
Nam Ngum 1 Dam

- Nam Ngum 1 - Installed capacity of 155 MW. Constructed 1968–1971, Phase 3 commissioned in 1984. A 2010 expansion project was partially funded by Japan International Cooperation Agency.
- Nam Song - Installed capacity of 6 MW. Completed in 2011.
- Nam Leuk - Installed capacity of 60 MW. Completed in 2000.
- Xeset 1 - Installed capacity of 45 MW. Completed in 1991, with funding provided by the Asian Development Bank, United Nations Development Programme, and the Swedish and Norwegian governments.
- Xeset 2 - Installed capacity of 76 MW. Completed in 2009. 80% of funding came from Export-Import Bank of China.
- Nan Mang 3 - Installed capacity of 40 MW. 80% of funding came from Export-Import Bank of China.
- Selabam - Installed capacity of 5.04 MW. Completed in 1994.

In June 2012, EDL-Gen approved the transfer of shares in four Independent Power Producers owned by Electricite du Laos to EDL-Gen: 60% of shares in Theun-Hinbeun (300 MW), 10% of shares in Nam Leuk 1-2 (10 MW), 25% of shares in Nam Ngum 2 (153.75 MW), and 20% of shares in Houay Ho (30 MW). The transfer of 4 IPPs will increase EDL-Gen's total capacity to 881 MW. EDL-Gen also plans to purchase two hydropower plants from Electricite du Laos that are currently under construction: Nam Khan 2 (126 MW) and Huaylamphan Nhai (88 MW).

On January 11, 2011, EDL-Generation Company participated in an initial public offering on the Lao Securities Exchange (LSX), becoming the first company to list on the country's stock exchange. Initial investors in the IPO included frontier markets private equity firm Leopard Capital, Thai energy company Ratchaburi Holding, Thai state-owned bank Krung Thai Bank, and Vietnamese investment firm Dragon Capital. Despite the LSX's limited liquidity, at the end of its first week of trading, EDL-Gen was up 30% from the IPO price at 5,600 Lao kip (LAK) ($0.69).
