= Mining industry of Laos =

The mining industry of Laos has foreign direct investments (FDI) which has, since 2003–04, made contributions to the economic condition of Laos. More than 540 mineral deposits of gold, copper, zinc, lead and other minerals have been identified, explored and mined. During 2012, the mining and quarrying sector's contribution to GDP was around 7.0%; during this reporting year the FDI in the mineral sector was of the order of US$662.5 million out of a total trade of $4.7 billion in the country. Laos is a member of the WTO.

== History ==
After 2003, the first mining project, the Sepon Mine was established. There were 127 domestic and foreign companies in 2008 working 213 projects covering prospecting, exploration and feasibility studies period.

Geological survey maps related to the mining sector are of 1964 prepared by France and updated during the 1990s and these cover 54.86% of the country (236,800 km^{2}). The Ministry of Natural Resources and the Environment has been delegated the powers to create a geologic database for effective management of mining projects including its exploration.

== Production and impact ==
As of 2009 the reserves of gold, copper and zinc were assessed at about 500 to 600 tons, 8 to 10 million tons, and 2 to 3 million tons respectively. In 2009 there were about 35 working mines including the Sepon and Phubia mines.

The impact of FDI is on export promotion.

According to the International Council on Mining and Metals, as of 2011, the mining sector has accounted for 12% of government revenues and 10% of national income with 80% of foreign direct investment. Mining exports contributed 45% of the total exports of the country. In particular, the Sepon mine and the Phu Kham mine have contributed to 90% of the total mining production in the country.

== Legal framework ==
The laws in force are of 2 types, the national mining laws and the investment promotion laws under the New Economic Mechanism (NEM) introduced in 1986. The national Mining Law which is effective since April 1997 is aimed at management including quality control of conservation, exploration, mining and processing of minerals for local use and for exports, apart from its use in industries. This law is under revision and the draft prepared in 2008 is under consideration of the National Assembly. The investment law related to FDI was introduced in 1988 which has undergone revision in 2004 and 2008. Under the mining law in force licenses are awarded to develop mineral projects with the Department of Mines authorized to issue such licenses.

== Commodities ==
Bauxite and Alumina are extracted from the Bolaven Plateau jointly with firms from Australia and China. Copper, gold, and silver are being extracted by the MMG Ltd in the Sepon mine and PanAust Ltd in the Phu Kham mine. Zinc, potash and cement production have been recorded during 2012.

== Overview ==
Following the signing of the WTO agreement, Laos's investments in the mining sector were expected to rise with increased production of copper, gold, and silver.

== List of mines ==
=== Coal ===
- Hongsa coal mine

=== Copper ===
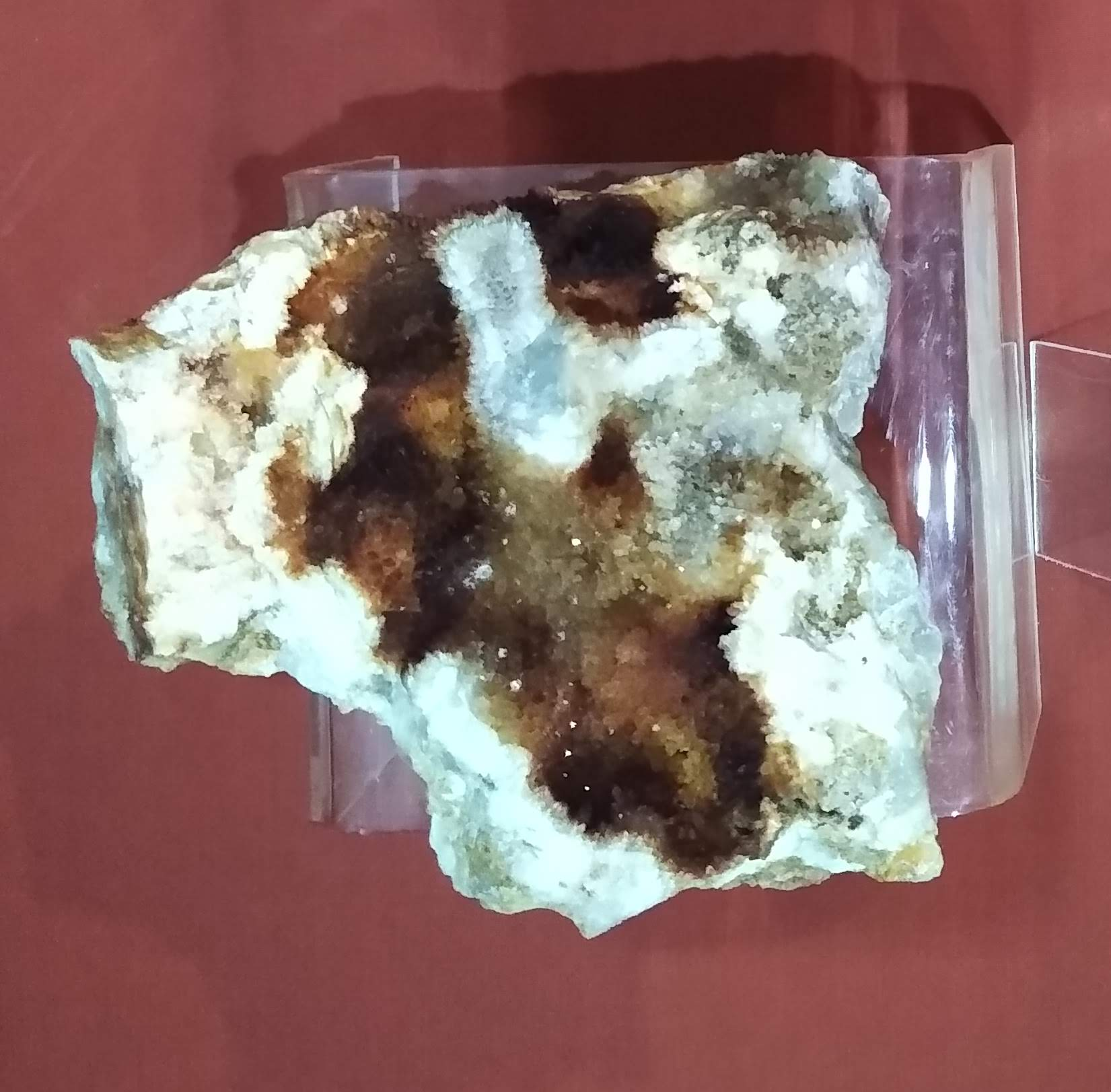
Native copper from Sepon mine

- Sepon mine
- Phu Kham mine

=== Gold ===
- Sepon mine
- Phu Kham mine
- Ban Houayxai mine

=== Gypsum ===
- Ban laomakkha mine

=== Potash ===
- Nahe mine
- Thagone mine

=== Silver ===
- Ban Houayxai mine

=== Tin ===
- Nong Xun mine
- Phon Tiou mine
