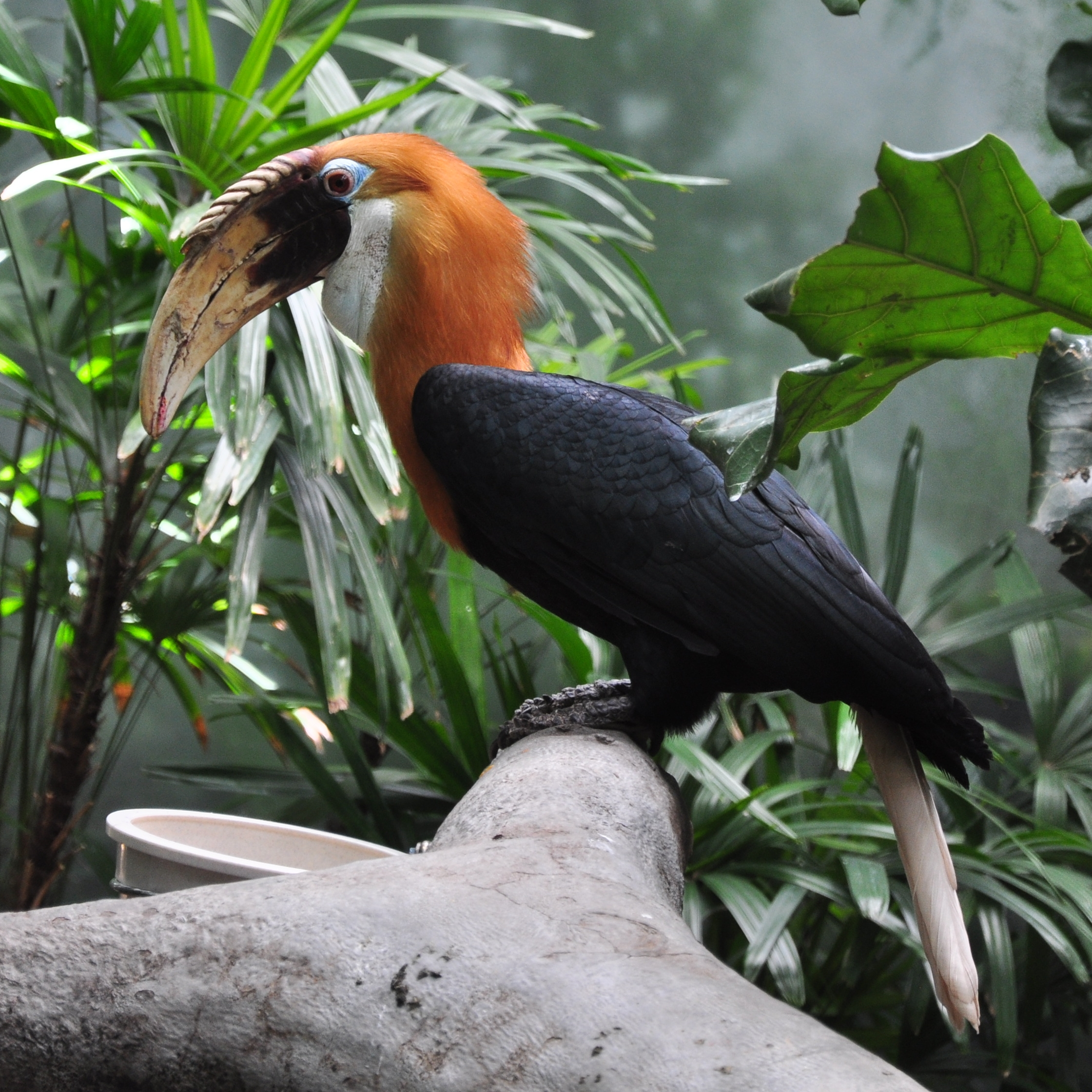
- Adult male at Lincoln Park Zoo
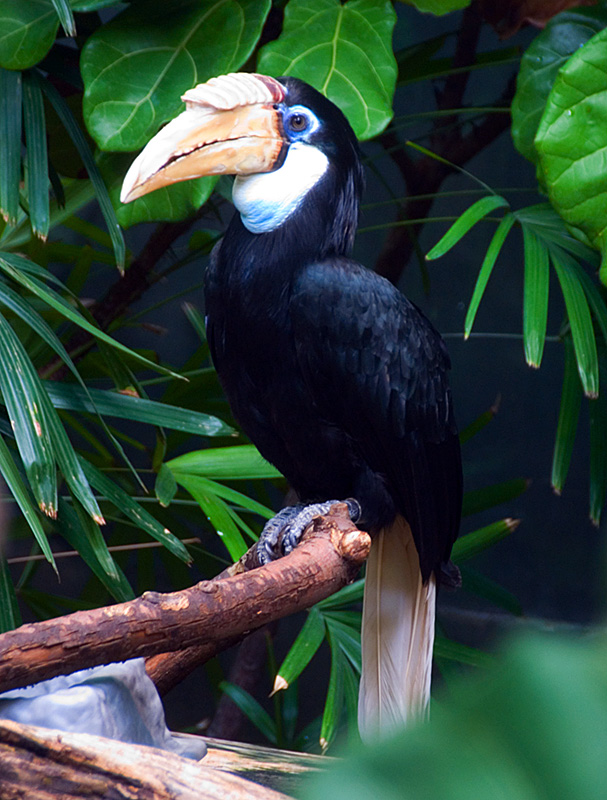
- Female

Conservation status
- Least Concern (IUCN 3.1)
- CITES Appendix II

Scientific classification
- Kingdom: Animalia
- Phylum: Chordata
- Class: Aves
- Order: Bucerotiformes
- Family: Bucerotidae
- Genus: Rhyticeros
- Species: R. plicatus

Binomial name
- Rhyticeros plicatus (Pennant, 1781)

Subspecies
- 6 subspecies, see text

Synonyms
- Aceros plicatus (Forster, 1781)

= Blyth's hornbill =

Species of bird

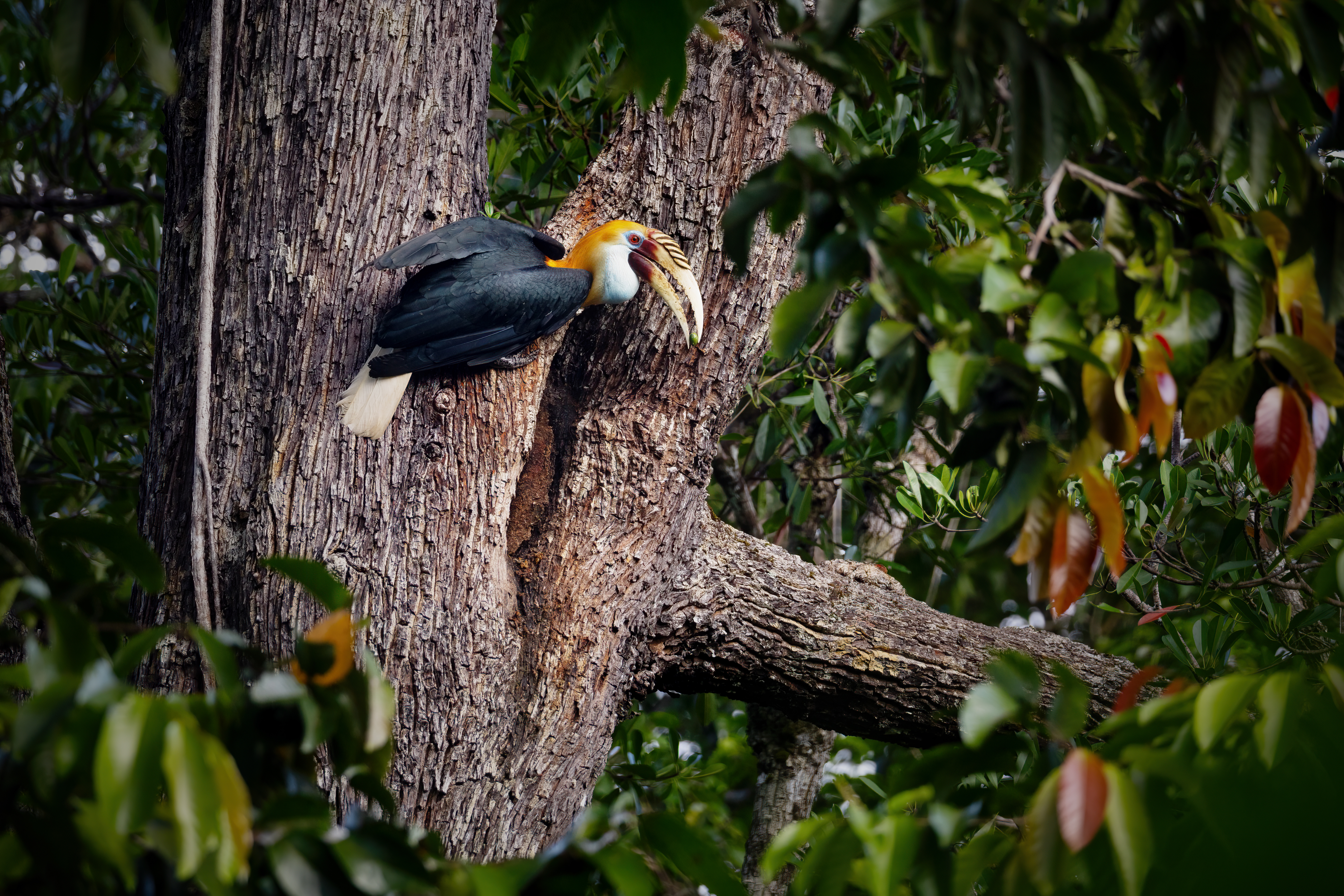
Wild blyth's Hornbill male passing fruit to mate

Blyth's hornbill (Rhyticeros plicatus), also known as the Papuan hornbill, is a large hornbill inhabiting the forest canopy in Wallacea and Melanesia. Its local name in Tok Pisin is kokomo.

Previously, this hornbill was placed in the genus Aceros. It has often been lumped with the plain-pouched hornbill (R. subruficollis), and sometimes considered to include the Narcondam hornbill (R. narcondami) and the wreathed hornbill (R. undulatus) as subspecies.

The common name commemorates Edward Blyth (1810–1873), English zoologist and curator of the museum of the Asiatic Society of Bengal.

== Description ==
Up to 91 cm (36 in) in length, the adult male has mainly black plumage with a golden or orange-buff head, white throat and a white tail. Its irises are reddish brown, and the eye is surrounded by naked pale blue skin. The female is a smaller, mainly black bird with a white throat and tail. Both sexes have a very large horn-coloured bill and casque. Young birds of both sexes resemble the male. Adults have up to eight folds on the pale casque, depending on age, while young birds have none.

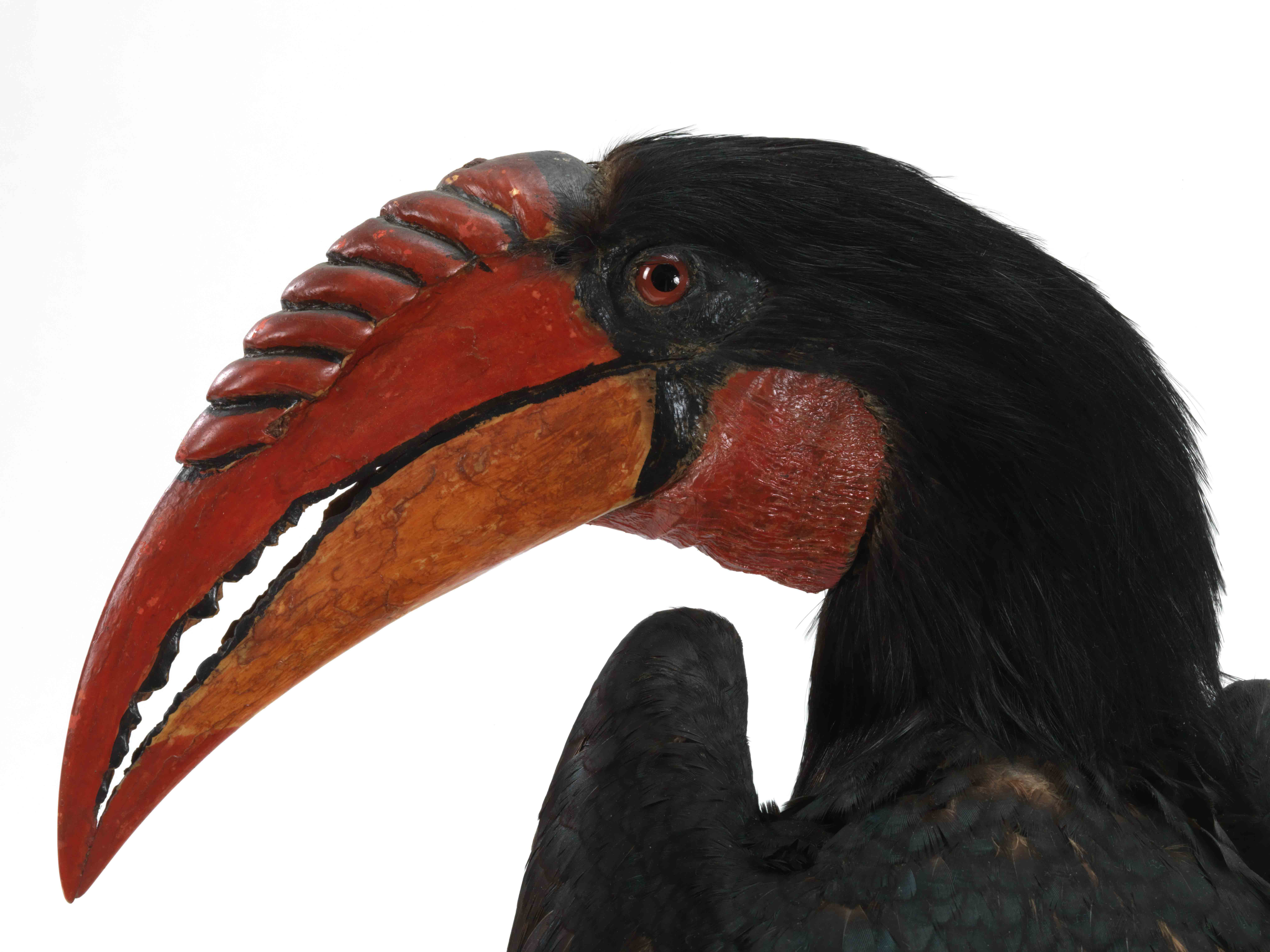
Detail of the hornbill

In flight, the sound of its wings is loud and distinctive, a rushing noise that has been compared to the sound of steam escaping from a steam locomotive. It has a range of far-reaching, guttural grunting and laughing calls.

== Subspecies ==
Various subspecies have been described across its range:

- R. p. plicatus (Forster, 1781) – South Moluccas
- R. p. ruficollis (Vieillot, 1816) – North Moluccas and West Papua, eastwards to the Southern Highlands and Simbu Province, Papua New Guinea
- R. p. jungei Mayr, 1937 – Eastern New Guinea, west as far as the Fly River region
- R. p. dampieri Mayr, 1934 – Bismarck Archipelago
- R. p. harterti Mayr, 1934 – Bougainville and Buka Islands
- R. p. mendanae Hartert, 1924 – Solomon Islands from Choiseul to Guadalcanal and Malaita

== Distribution and ecology ==
The Papuan hornbill occurs throughout lowland forests, from sea level up to 1,200–1,500 m ASL, in the Moluccas, New Guinea, the Bismarck Archipelago, and as far east as the Solomon Islands. It is the only hornbill species native to New Guinea, and one of the largest flying birds of the region. There have also been rare reported sightings on the Saibai and Boigu Islands in the Torres Strait, Queensland, Australia.

Its diet consists mainly of fruits, especially figs, occasionally supplemented with insects and other small animals.

The Papuan hornbill nests in a large tree hollow in the rainforest, from at least 18 m (59 ft) up to 30 m (98 ft) above the ground. The female is restricted to the nest cavity throughout the incubation and nestling period, being largely sealed inside by plastering up the entrance with a mixture of fruit pulp and rotten wood, leaving only a narrow aperture through which the male feeds her. The clutch size is about two eggs.

=== Status and relationship with humans ===
Still widespread throughout its large range, the Papuan hornbill is assessed as least concern on the IUCN Red List of Threatened Species. However, it is subject to hunting pressure by some tribal groups, who use its feathers in headdresses, its bill as a personal adornment, and the lower mandible as a spear point. As a consequence, it is becoming rarer in some areas of New Guinea. On the other hand, this species has withstood tens of millennia of human hunting pressure. So as long as sufficient habitat is preserved, it is unlikely that hunting alone will prove a significant threat unless population increases include concomitant increases in hunting pressures.
