= Dong Phou Vieng National Protected Area =

National protected area in Laos

- IUCN category VI (protected area with sustainable use of natural resources)
- Location within Laos
- Location: Savannakhet Province, Laos
- Nearest city: Savannakhet
- Coordinates: 16°24′24″N 106°19′46″E
- Area: 1,970 km^{2} (760 sq mi)
- Designated: 7 July 1995

Dong Phou Vieng National Protected Area is a national protected area in Savannakhet Province in central Laos. This mostly forested park is home to large variety of animal species and contains part of the former Ho Chi Minh trail. The park is home to the Katang ethnic group and is an ecotourism destination.

== Geography ==
Dong Phou Vieng National Protected Area is located about 100 kilometres (60 mi) east of Savannakhet, near the village of Muang Phin and covers parts of Phin, Xepon and Nong districts. The park's area is 1,970 square kilometres (760 sq mi). Elevations generally range from 200 metres (660 ft) to mountainous areas above 1,000 metres (3,300 ft). The park's major mountain peaks are Phou Dotouy at 1,254 metres (4,110 ft) and Phou Lapeung Nua at 1,122 metres (3,680 ft).

== History ==
In 1995 Dong Phou Vieng National Protected Area initially covered 530 square kilometres (200 sq mi). This was extended in 1998 to cover the present area of 1,970 square kilometres (760 sq mi).

== Flora and fauna ==
The park's main forest types are semi-evergreen, deciduous dipterocarp and mixed deciduous belonging to the Central Indochina dry forests region. Semi-evergreen forest covers half of the park's area.

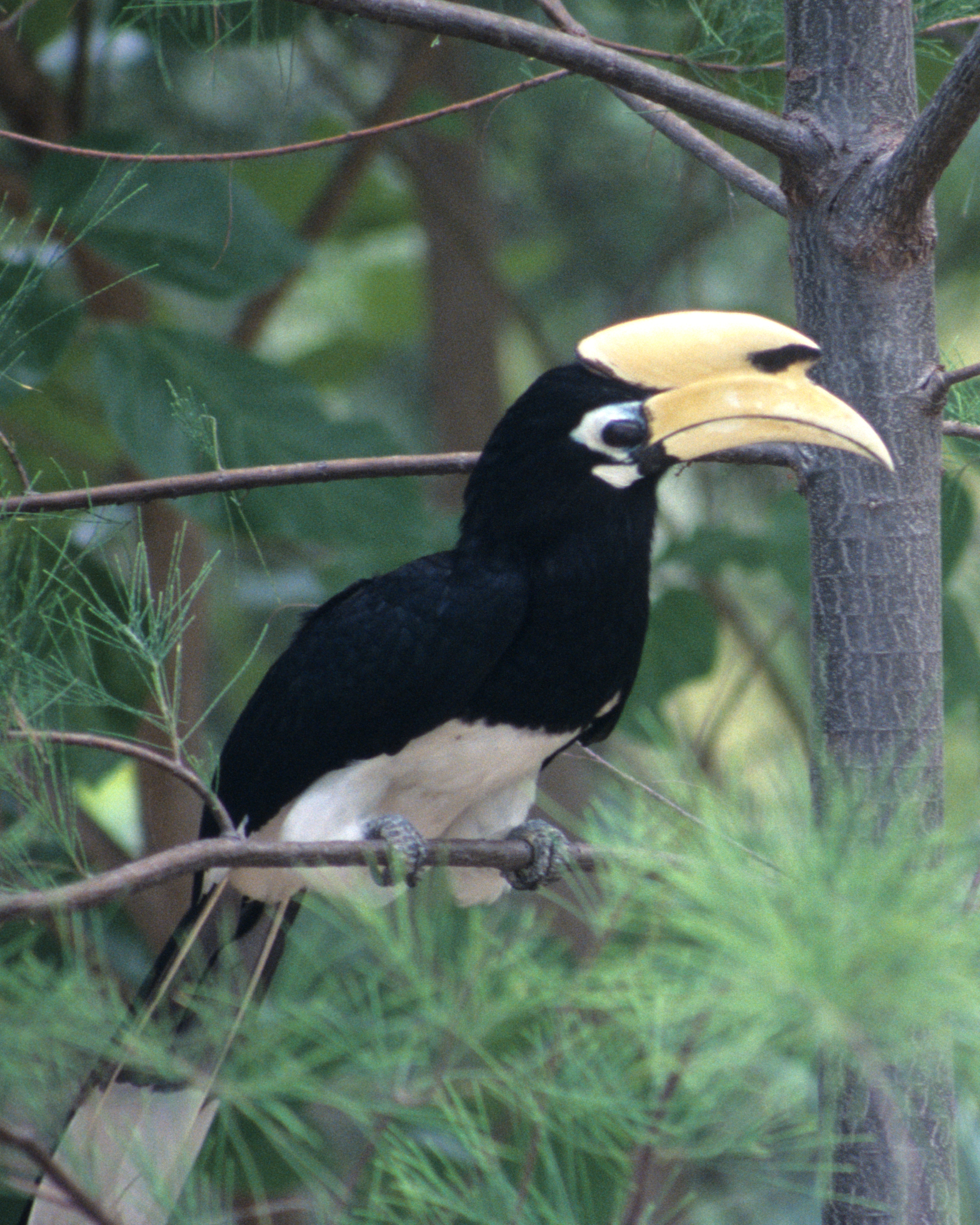
Oriental pied hornbill

Animal species include leaf monkey, gibbon, douc langur, gaur, giant muntjac, dhole, jackal, tiger, pangolin, python and king cobra. Two herds of wild elephants are known in the park.

Bird life includes the oriental pied hornbill, great hornbill, wreathed hornbill, white-rumped vulture and red-headed vulture.

== Threats ==
Dong Phou Vieng faces a number of environmental threats. The most significant is hunting and poaching of animals including endangered species such as pangolin and king cobra. Other threats include destructive fishing practices and expansion of rice paddy fields.
