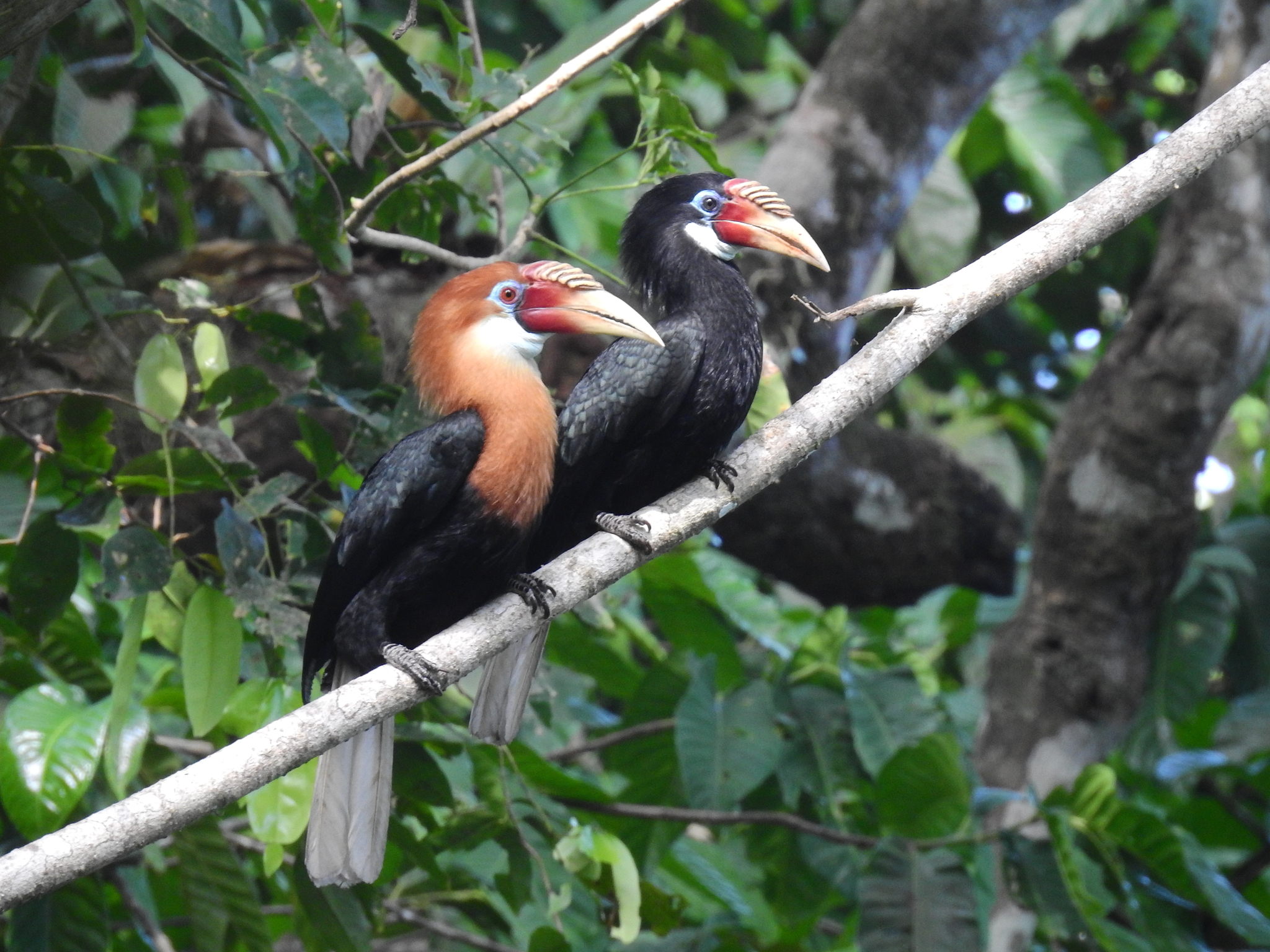
- Male (front) and female (back)

Conservation status
- Vulnerable (IUCN 3.1)
- CITES Appendix II

Scientific classification
- Kingdom: Animalia
- Phylum: Chordata
- Class: Aves
- Order: Bucerotiformes
- Family: Bucerotidae
- Genus: Rhyticeros
- Species: R. narcondami

Binomial name
- Rhyticeros narcondami Hume, 1873
- Location of Narcondam Island

Synonyms
- Aceros narcondami Rhytidoceros narcondami Rhyticeros plicatus narcondami

= Narcondam hornbill =

Species of bird

The Narcondam hornbill (Rhyticeros narcondami) is a species of hornbill in the family Bucerotidae. It is endemic to the Indian island of Narcondam in the Andaman Islands. Males and females have a distinct plumage. The Narcondam hornbill has the smallest global range of any Asian hornbill species, the entire population being confined to about 7 km² of forest on a single island.

== Description ==
The Narcondam hornbill is a small hornbill at 66 cm (26 in) long. The sexes differ in plumage. The male has a rufous head and neck, black body and upper parts glossed with green. Females are all black. There is a bluish white throat patch and the tail is white in both sexes. Both sexes have a bill with a few folds on the upper side towards the base of the upper mandible. The skin around the eye is bluish. The iris of the male is orange red while the female has an olive brown with a pale yellow ring. The bill is waxy and the furrows of the casque are brownish. The bill is pinkish towards the base. The legs are black and the sole is yellow.

== Taxonomy ==
The species was described by Allan Octavian Hume in 1873. The Narcondam hornbill is placed in the genus Rhyticeros, which is found only in Asia; molecular evidence suggests that hornbills originated in Africa. Closely related species include the wreathed hornbill (Rhyticeros undulatus) and Blyth's hornbill (Rhyticeros plicatus).

== Behaviour ==
=== Vocalisations ===
Adults have a ka-ka-ka call in flight and a ko ... kokoko..ko..kok.. kok.. call at the nest. The young in the nest produce feeble chew calls.

=== Diet and ecology ===
The hornbill is predominantly frugivorous. Hussain (1984) identified seven food-tree species from seeds in middens below nest trees, including Anamirta cocculus, Capparis sepiaria, Garuga pinnata, Amoora rohituka, Terminalia catappa and Ixora brunniscens. Subsequent studies expanded the dietary list considerably: Manchi (2017) recorded at least 22 fruit species taken during the breeding season, including Canarium euphyllum and Aglaia andamanica, while a 2019–2020 study documented 23 food-plant species, with Ficus rumphii, Ficus glaberrima, Endocomia, Chionanthus and Aidea densiflorum important in the December to February diet. Invertebrates and occasionally small reptiles are also taken. The species sometimes mobs white-bellied sea eagles that fly too close. As predominantly fruit eaters, Narcondam hornbills play an important role in seed dispersal of Ficus and other plants; figs are critical in the ecology of many insular hornbill species and a major determinant of their distribution patterns.

=== Reproduction ===
The breeding period spans at least from February until April. The species nests in holes on the trunk or broken branches of large trees; the female remains concealed in the nest cavity for the duration of egg-laying and chick-rearing and sheds her flight feathers during this period. The male provides food for the female and chicks. Each pair generally raises two offspring. Breeding birds are over four years of age and make up 46–53% of the population. Manchi (2017) monitored 21 nests and recorded 93% nesting success. Twelve tree species have been documented as nest trees, including Tetrameles nudiflora, Zanthoxylum, Aglaia, Neonauclea and Ficus nervosa.

Birds have been maintained in captivity but have not been bred successfully. In 1972, S. A. Hussain visited Narcondam and captured two adult hornbills and their chicks; the male died during the voyage and the female escaped at Madras. The chicks survived in captivity for about six years.

== Habitat and distribution ==
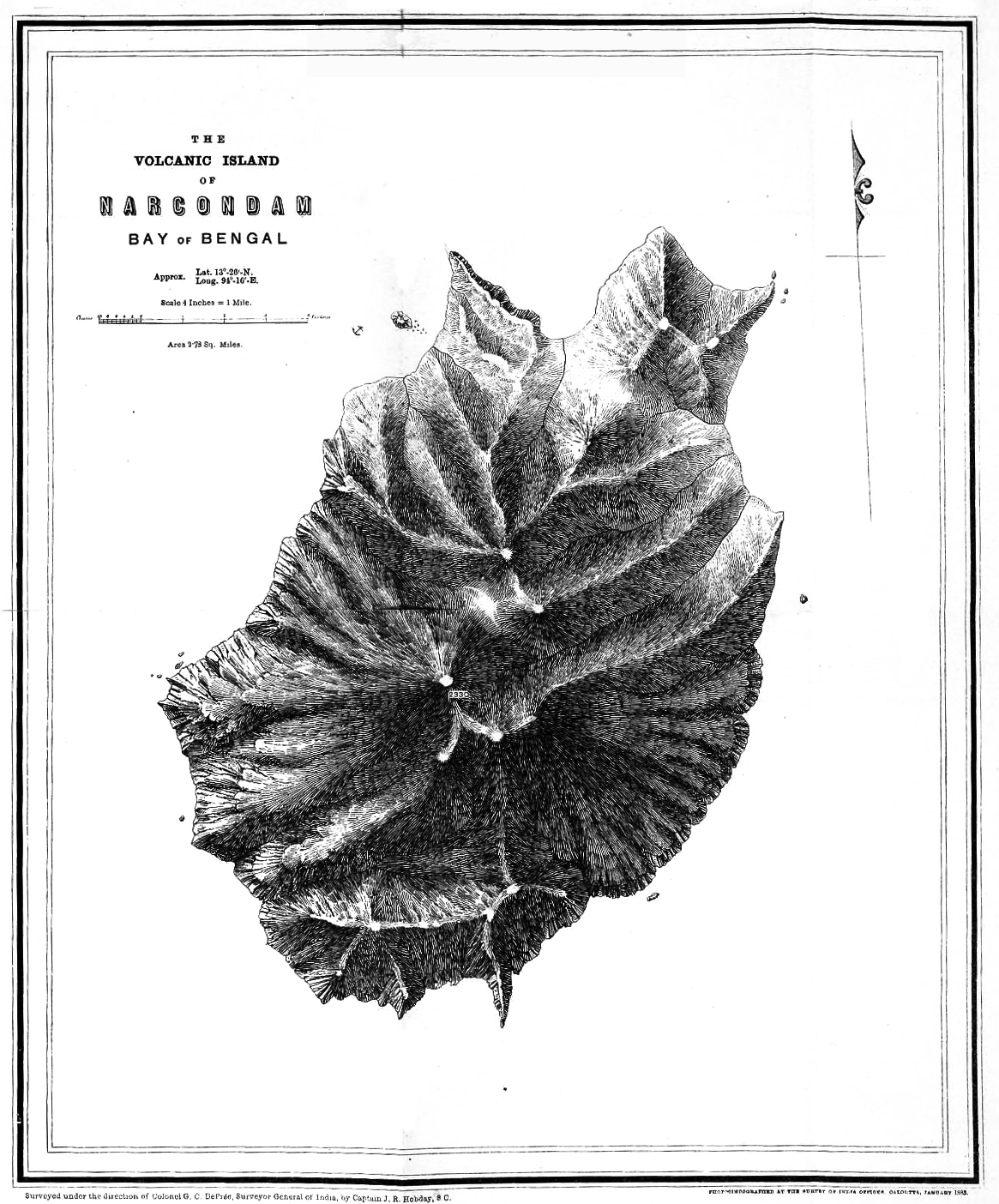
Topography of Narcondam Island

The Narcondam hornbill inhabits fairly open mixed forest covering most of the island, from sea level to the peak at about 700 m, although most nests are below 200 m and a few up to 450 m. The northern and north-eastern portions of the island are dominated by deciduous forest, with evergreen forest elsewhere and cloud forest at the summit. Mature undisturbed forest with large trees is preferred for nesting and roosting; favoured nest trees include Sideroxylon and Sterculia species. The island has an area of 6.82 km² and rises to about 700 m above sea level, and is largely devoid of human presence aside from a small police outpost. Cyclonic storms in the Bay of Bengal occasionally hit the island; the 2004 Indian Ocean tsunami did not affect the species.

== Population ==
Population estimates have varied considerably across more than a century of surveys, partly reflecting different methods and partly reflecting genuine recovery. Osmaston (1905) gave a "liberal estimate" of not more than 200 birds, while Hussain (1984), after a one-month survey in 1972, suggested a figure of around 400. The first transect-based estimate, by Vijayan and Sankaran in 1998, reported 330–360 individuals. Yahya and Zarri (2002), using two line-transect methods in March 2000, estimated densities of 72 to 83 birds per km² and a total population of 432 to 498 birds over the available habitat.

More recent surveys have produced substantially higher figures. Raman et al. (2013) recorded 167 birds per km² in lowland forest in April 2010; Manchi (2017) estimated a density of 190 ± 81 per km², and Naniwadekar's 2019–2020 line-transect work gave 150 individuals per km². Extrapolated across the island, the 2019–2020 survey indicates a total population of 750–1,400 individuals (95% confidence interval), which the 2020 IUCN assessment converts to 300–650 mature individuals after applying the proportion of breeding adults and a male-biased sex ratio. The population is considered stable or possibly increasing following the cessation of hunting and the removal of feral goats.

A 2025 preprint using mitochondrial DNA from faecal samples reports very low genetic diversity in the Narcondam hornbill compared with the widespread wreathed hornbill, with no variation detected in the Cytb or COI markers; the authors attribute this to a small founder population, the long generation time of hornbills, and a historical bottleneck caused by hunting that may have reduced the population to about 30% of its current level.

== Conservation status ==
The Narcondam hornbill was listed as Vulnerable from 1994 to 2008, uplisted to Endangered in 2009 in light of proposed development on the island, and then downlisted back to Vulnerable under criteria D1+2 in the 2020 IUCN Red List assessment, reflecting the higher population estimates from post-2010 surveys and the successful removal of feral goats. The entire global population is treated as a single subpopulation on one island, and the species occurs in a single Important Bird Area (Narcondam Island Wildlife Sanctuary, 8 km²). It is listed on Appendix II of CITES and is protected in India under Schedule I of the Wildlife (Protection) Act.

=== Threats and conservation actions ===
A small police outpost was established on the island in 1969 and led to clearance of about 20 ha for the post and for plantations of coconut, areca, banana and vegetables, although only 5–7 ha is now actively cultivated. Up to 400 feral goats, introduced in the past, had limited forest regeneration; they have since been removed, and a sizeable feral cat population has been reduced to two males. Rats remain abundant across all elevations and are known to predate seeds of several hornbill food plants; a study assessing rodent impacts on plant regeneration began in 2019. Hunting was estimated to be removing 25–40 birds per year at the start of the 2000s, but an awareness campaign has reduced this to negligible levels. Police personnel now rely on gas cylinders and stoves, reducing fuelwood demand, and dry deadwood is only occasionally collected.

A 2011 proposal by the Indian Coast Guard to install a radar station and a diesel power-generation station on the island was rejected by the Ministry of Environment and Forests in 2012 because of likely impacts on the hornbill and other endemic species. In June 2014, following Chinese monitoring activity on Myanmar's neighbouring Coco Island, a revised approval was granted for a coastal surveillance facility; however, the plan was subsequently modified and no radar installation has been built on the island.

The species remains vulnerable to stochastic events such as disease, the accidental introduction of non-native predators, and severe storms, given its tiny range and single subpopulation. The 2020 IUCN assessment recommends regular monitoring, removal of the remaining cats, ongoing rat-impact assessment, and careful evaluation of a possible second population on another Andaman island.
