= Viraboury district =

Viraboury ເມືອງວີລະບຸລີ Vilabuly
- District
- Interactive map of Viraboury
- Country: Laos
- Province: Savannakhet

Area
  - Total: 1,756 km^{2} (678 sq mi)

Population (2015)
  - Total: 39,215
- Time zone: UTC+7 (ICT)

Viraboury or Vilabuly, is a district (muang) of Savannakhet province, Laos. It covers an area of approximately 1,756 km^{2} (678 sq mi) and had a population of 39,215 in 2015. It is subdivided into 72 villages.

== History ==
Viraboury district was heavily bombed during the Vietnam War between 1965 and 1973. The district was targeted due to its location along the Ho Chi Minh trail. The war led to significant destruction of property and forced relocation of population within the district. The district is one of the four areas in the province identified as containing a high level of unexploded ordnance from the war.

== Geography ==
Viraboury is one of the 15 districts (muang) of Savannakhet Province, Laos. It covers an area of approximately 1,756 km^{2} (678 sq mi). It borders Boualapha and Xaibouathong districts of Khammouane province, and Phine, Seponh, Thaphalanxay and Assaphone districts of Savannakhet Province. The district contains gold and copper deposits, which are mined.

The district is subdivided into 72 villages. According to the 2015 census, 71 villages had road access, 52 had access to electricity, 13 had a health facility, 60 had a complete school, six had an incomplete school and three had a market. None of the villages was recorded as having a public water supply system.

== Demographics ==
According to the 2015 census, Viraboury District had a population of 39,215, including 5,149 people in urban areas and 34,066 in rural areas. The district is inhabited primarily by two major ethnolinguistic groups, the Phou Thai and the Brou. The Phou Thay speak a language belonging to the southwestern Thai branch, while the Brou speak languages belonging to the Mon-Khmer branch of the Austroasiatic language family.

== Economy ==
Agriculture and animal husbandry are important contributors of the economy. Rice and forest produce including meat and vegetables form the major part of the people's diet. The Enhancing Milled Rice Production in Vilabouly project was implemented in 2013, which sought to improve the production and supply of locally milled rice. In 2024, the district produced 17 tonnes of rice.

The Sepon mine, an open-pit gold and copper mine, is located in the district. The exploration of minerals began in 1993 and the mine started production in the early 2000s. People had to shifted from villages when the mining activities commenced. These forced relocations have led to rural communities losing their livelihoods and the mixing of people from various ethnicity with mixed beliefs and different cultural traditions. However, the mines are the second highest contributor of national revenue, and has contributed to employment, development of local business and infrastructure. In April 2015, the Lao government announced that Viraboury had been removed from the list of the country's poorest districts due to the development programmes undertaken by the mining company and the local authorities. The mining area also contains numerous caves and archaeological sites.
