= Nahe =

Nahe may refer to:

- Nahe (Rhine), a river in Rhineland-Palatinate and Saarland, Germany, tributary of the Rhine
- Nahe (Schleuse), a river in Thuringia, Germany, tributary of the Schleuse
- Nahe, Schleswig-Holstein, a municipality in the district of Segeberg, in Schleswig-Holstein, Germany
- Nahe (wine region), region (Anbaugebiet) for quality wine in Germany
- Nahe mine, a potash mine in southern Laos
