= Ban laomakkha mine =

Gypsum mine in Savannakhet, Laos

Location
- Location: Savannakhet Province, Laos

Production
- Products: Gypsum

The Ban laomakkha mine is.located in Savannakhet Province. With reserves amounting to 42 million tonnes of gypsum, it is one of the largest gypsum mines in Laos.
