= Banghiang River =

River in Laos

Coordinates: 16°19′5.3″N 105°58′35.3″E

Location
- Country: Laos

Physical characteristics
- Source
  - location: Annamite Range
- Mouth
  - location: Mekong River near Savannakhet

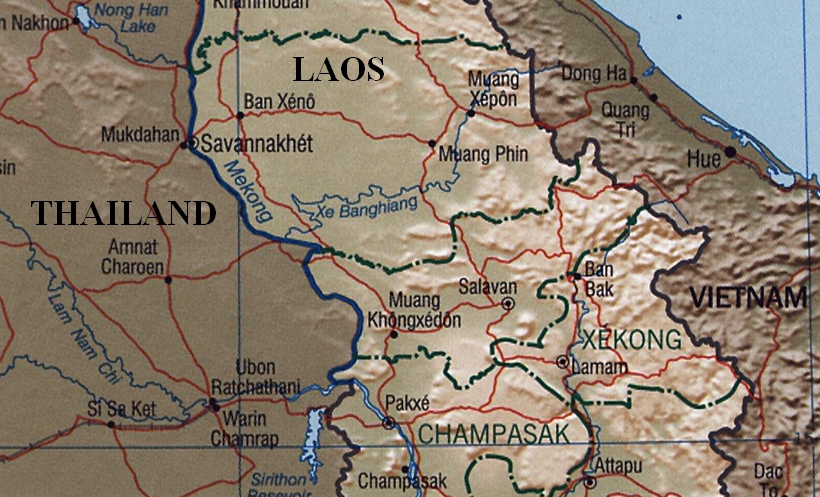
Banghiang River

Banghiang River (Se Banghiang, Sê Băng Hiêng in Vietnamese) is a river in Savannakhet Province of Laos and a tributary of the Mekong River. It originates on the west side of the Annamite Range and joins the Mekong near Savannakhet city.
