= Xonboury district =

Xonboury ເມືອງຊົນນະບູລີ Xonbuly
- District
- Location within Laos
- Coordinates: 16.4003°N 105.5739°E
- Country: Laos
- Province: Savannakhet

Area
  - Total: 1,373 km^{2} (530 sq mi)

Population (2015)
  - Total: 60,347
- Time zone: UTC+7 (ICT)

Xonboury or Xonbuly is a district (muang) of Savannakhet province, Laos. It covers an area of approximately 1,628 km^{2} (629 sq mi) and had a population of 60,347 according to the 2015 census. The district is subdivided into 62 villages.

== Geography ==
Xonbuly is one of the 15 districts (muang) of Savannakhet Province, Laos. It covers an area of approximately 1,373 km^{2} (530 sq mi). The district is bordered by Phine, Thapangthong, Thaphalanxay, Songkhone, and Champhone districts of Savannakhet Province.

The land cover consists of dry dipterocarp forest (32.5%), rice fields (31.1%) and mixed deciduous forest (27.9%). Agriculture is concentrated in the eastern, northern and western corners of the district, while the central area forms part of the Ongmang Provincial Conservation Forest and is predominantly covered by dry dipterocarp forest. The Ongmang Provincial Conservation Forest covers an area of approximately 68,465 ha (169,180 acres) and is an important habitat for Eld's deer.

The district is situated in the Xe Bang Hieng River Basin. The river forms part of the southern boundary of the district. Other rivers include the Xe Xangxoy and Xe Koumham rivers. The Xe Xangxoy river converges with the Xe Champhone river near the western border of the district. The floodplains and associated wetlands formed by these rivers provide habitats for fish and birds, and are used by the local communities for farming, fishing, and raising livestock.

The district has a tropical monsoon climate, with a dry season from November to early May and a wet season from May to October. The average monthly temperature reaches a maximum of approximately 42 °C (108 °F) in April. The district receives an average annual rainfall of approximately 1,354 mm (53.3 in).

The district is subdivided into 62 villages. According to the 2015 census, 44 villages had road access, 38 had access to electricity, 47 had a school, 11 had a health facility, and two had a market. Only one village had access to a public water supply system.

== Demographics ==
According to the 2015 census, Xonbuly District had a population of 60,347, including 2,717 people in urban areas, 49,360 in rural areas with road access and 8,270 in rural areas without road access. A 2019 report estimated the population at 65,935. The district is inhabited primarily by two ethnic groups, Lao and Breu. According to the 2019 report, the Lao accounted for 51% of the population and the Breu for 49%.

== Economy ==
In 2019, the district had a gross domestic product of 510 billion kip, an increase of 161 billion kip compared with 2014. Agriculture accounted for 82.6% of the district's GDP, industry for 5.8%, and services for 11.6%. The average GDP per capita was 7.7 million kip. In 2018, the district had a poverty rate of 13.6%, the lowest in the province excluding the city district of Kaysone Phomvihane.
