= Thaphalanxay district =

Thaphalanxay district ເມືອງພະລານໄຊ
- District
- Interactive map of Thaphalanxay district
- Country: Laos
- Province: Savannakhet

Area
  - Total: 1,047 km^{2} (404 sq mi)

Population (2015)
  - Total: 40,097
- Time zone: UTC+7 (ICT)

Thaphalanxay, or simply Phalanxay, is a district (muang) of Savannakhet province, Laos. It covers an area of approximately 1,047 km^{2} (404 sq mi) and had a population of 40,097 in 2015. It is subdivided into 54 villages. Portions of the district form a part of the Phou Xang He National Protected Area.

== Geography ==
Thaphalanxay is one of the 15 districts (muang) of Savannakhet Province, Laos. It covers an area of approximately 1,047 km^{2} (404 sq mi). It borders Viraboury, Phine, Champhone, Xonboury, Atsaphangthong and Assaphone districts of Savannakhet Province.

Part of the district is located on the foothills of the Phou Xang He Mountains. Along these mountains, dense forests occur in the highlands and the flat lands at the foothills consist of dry dipterocarp forests. The Phou Xang He National Protected Area was established in 1993 and covers an area of approximately 109,900 ha (272,000 acres), across parts of five districts in Savannakhet Province, including Thaphalanxay.

The district is subdivided into 54 villages. According to the 2015 census, 35 villages had access to electricity, 40 had road access, two had a market, six had a health facility, and 34 had a school.

== Demographics ==
According to the 2015 census, Thaphalanxay District had a population of 40,097, including 5,584 people in urban areas, 29,857 in rural areas with road access and 4,656 in rural areas without road access. According to a 2010 study conducted across two villages in the district, the majority of the people belonged to the Bru ethnic group.

== Economy ==
Agriculture and collection of forest produce are important livelihood activities in the foothills of the Phou Xang He Mountains. Rice cultivation and swidden agriculture was practised in the region. Expansion of agricultural area into forest lands in the Phou Xang He National Protected Area have resulted in human–wildlife conflict with Asian elephants. In 2024, the district produced 40 tonnes of rice. Local communities are also traditionally involved in non-timber forest products. In 2018, the district had a poverty rate of 42.7%.
