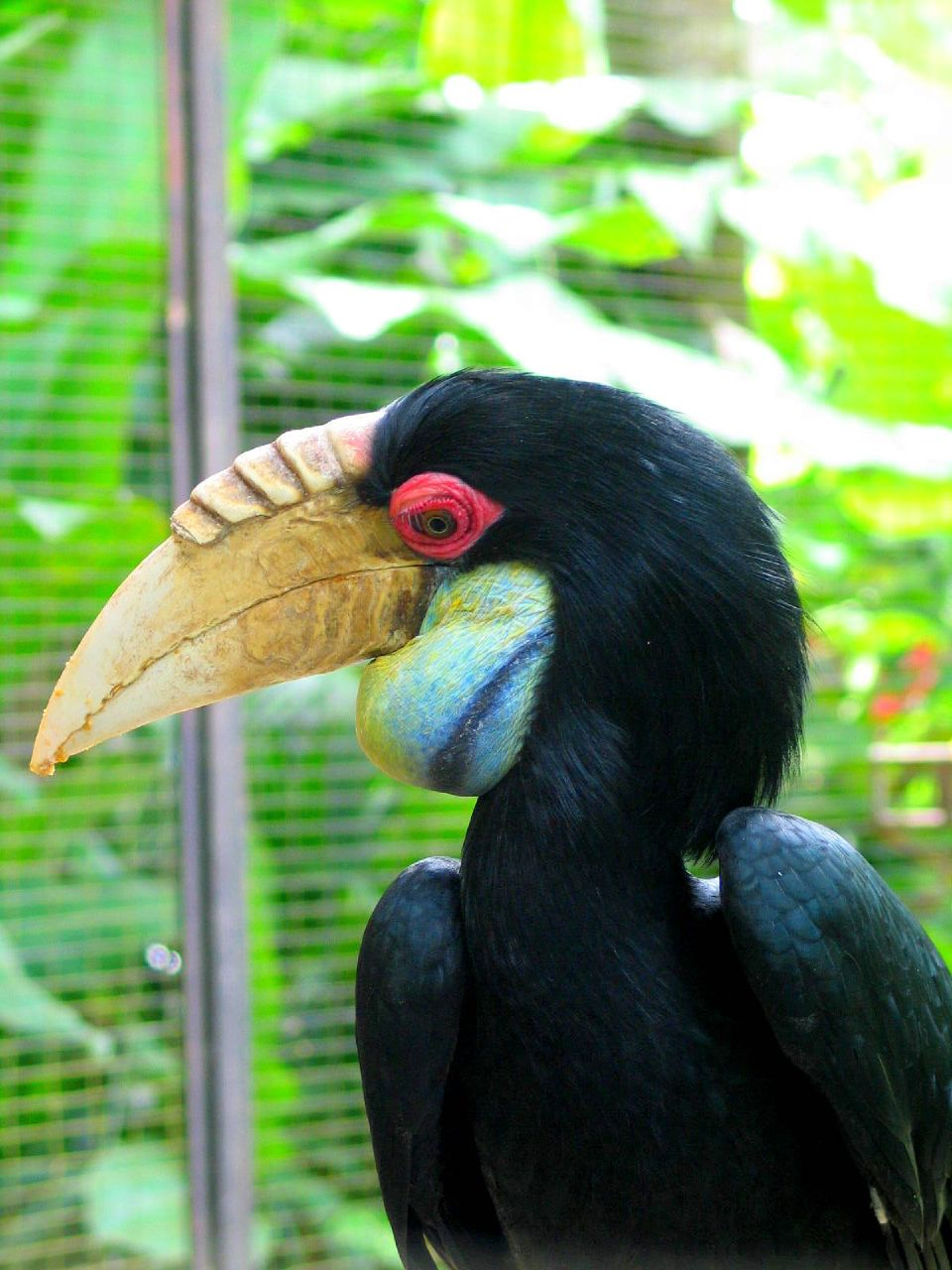
- Wreathed hornbill (R. undulatus)

Scientific classification
- Kingdom: Animalia
- Phylum: Chordata
- Class: Aves
- Order: Bucerotiformes
- Family: Bucerotidae
- Genus: Rhyticeros; Reichenbach, 1849

Type species
- Buceros plicatus Latham, 1790

Species
- See text.

= Rhyticeros =

Genus of birds

Rhyticeros is a genus of medium to large hornbills (family Bucerotidae) found in forests from Southeast Asia to the Solomons. They are sometimes included in the genus Aceros. On the other hand, most species generally placed in Aceros are sometimes moved to Rhyticeros, leaving Aceros as a monotypic genus only containing the rufous-necked hornbill.

All species generally placed in Rhyticeros have relatively low, conspicuously wreathed casques and a mainly dull whitish horn-colored bill. Both sexes have mainly black plumage, but the head and neck of the males are white or rufous. The tail is white except in the black-tailed Sumba hornbill. They have conspicuous inflatable skin on the throat, which is blue in all except the males of the plain-pouched and wreathed hornbills, where it is yellow.

== Species ==
The following six species are placed in the genus:

Image	Scientific name	Common name	Distribution
	Rhyticeros plicatus	Papuan (or Blyth's) hornbill	Wallacea and Melanesia.
	Rhyticeros narcondami	Narcondam hornbill	Narcondam
	Rhyticeros subruficollis	Plain-pouched hornbill	southern Myanmar, adjacent parts of western Thailand and northern Peninsular Malaysia
	Rhyticeros undulatus	Wreathed hornbill	north-eastern India and Bhutan, east and south through mainland Southeast Asia and the Greater Sundas in Indonesia
	Rhyticeros everetti	Sumba hornbill	Sumba in the Lesser Sunda Islands
	Rhyticeros cassidix	Knobbed hornbill	Sulawesi, Buton, Lembeh, Togian and Muna Island.

An undescribed extinct hornbill species from Lifou in the Loyalty Islands, living until at least some 30,000 years ago, was initially placed in Aceros, but its biogeography places it with the species now in Rhyticeros (Steadman, 2006).
