= Phon Tiou mine =

Tin mine in Laos

- Location: Khammouane Province, Laos
- Products: tin

Phon Tiou mine is a large mine in the southern part of Laos in Khammouane Province. Phon Tiou is one of the largest tin reserves in Laos, having estimated reserves of 10 million tonnes of ore grading 0.24% tin.
