= Sepon mine =

Gold mine in Savannakhet, Laos

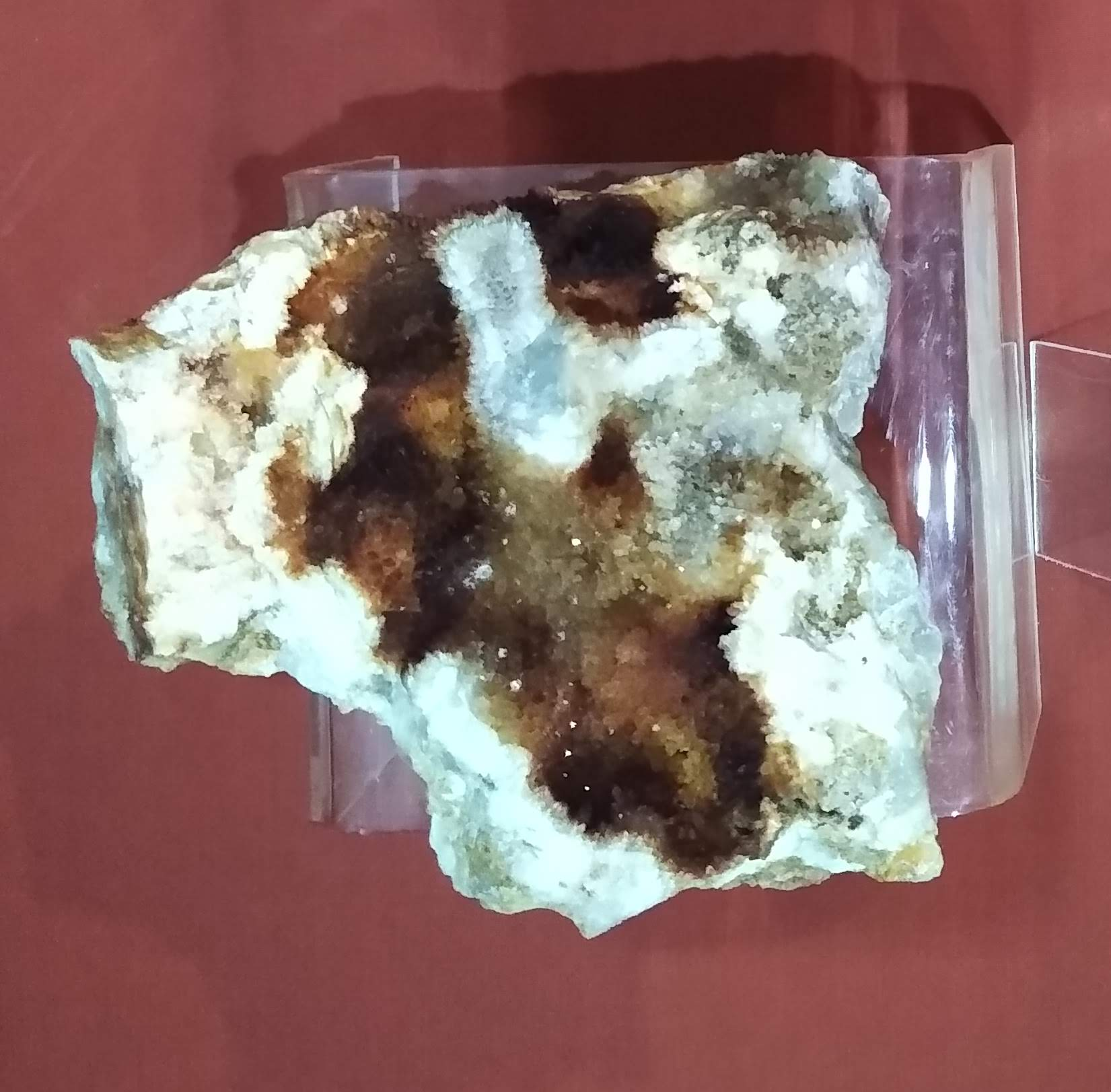
- Native copper from the mine
- Interactive map of Sepon mine
- Location: Savannakhet Province, Laos
- Products: Gold

The Sepon mine is one of the largest gold mines in Laos and in the world. The mine is in Savannakhet Province. The mine has estimated reserves of 86,430,000 tons (unspecified) of raw ore, yielding 2.77 grams/ton of gold; if short tons are meant, this would imply the reserves are approximately 7.65 million oz of pure gold, or if metric tons, then 8.45 million ounces.
