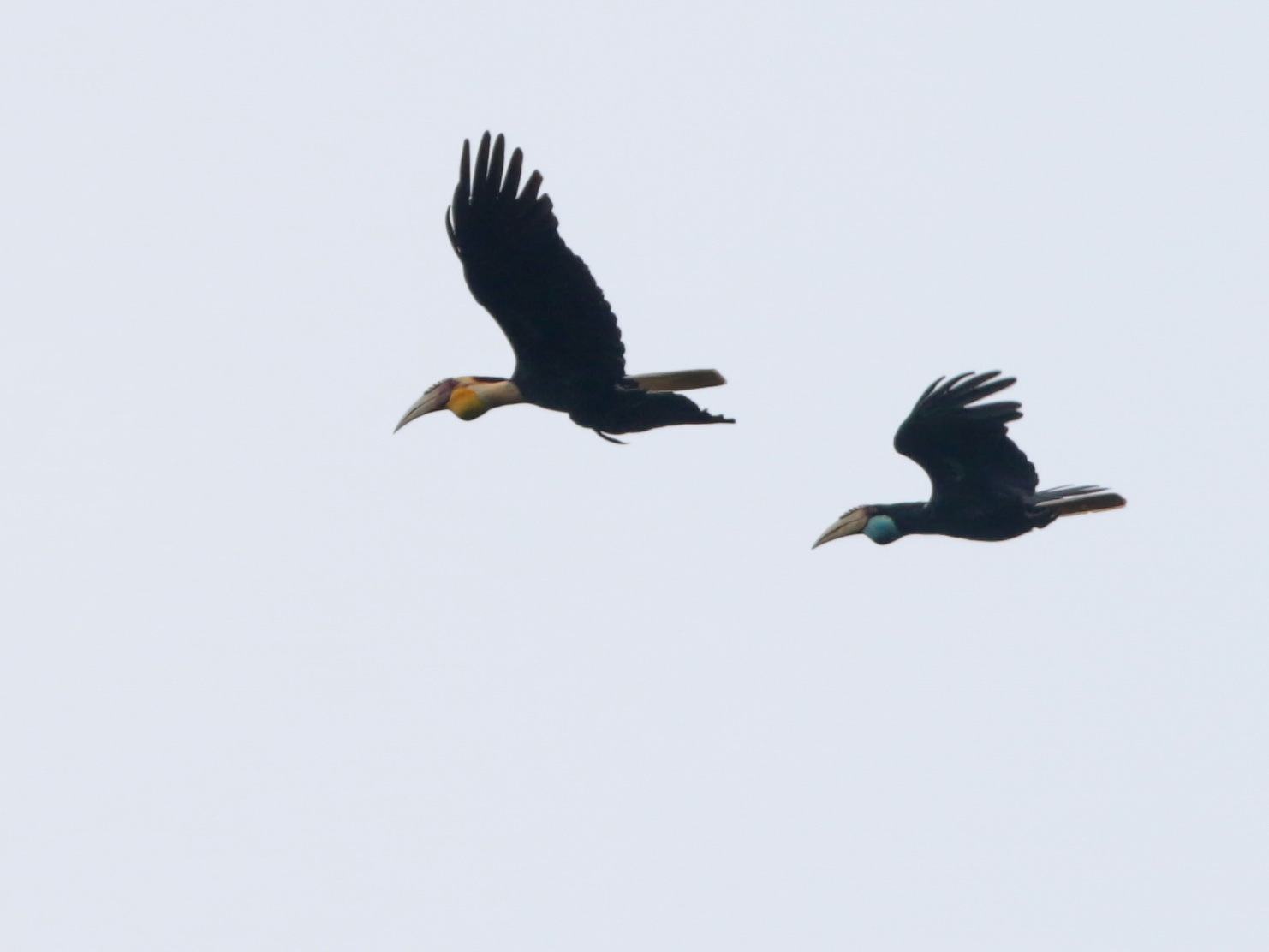

Conservation status
- Vulnerable (IUCN 3.1)
- CITES Appendix I

Scientific classification
- Kingdom: Animalia
- Phylum: Chordata
- Class: Aves
- Order: Bucerotiformes
- Family: Bucerotidae
- Genus: Rhyticeros
- Species: R. subruficollis

Binomial name
- Rhyticeros subruficollis (Blyth, 1843)

Synonyms
- Aceros subruficollis

= Plain-pouched hornbill =

Species of bird

The plain-pouched hornbill (Rhyticeros subruficollis) is a species of hornbill in the family Bucerotidae. It is found in forests of the Dawna Range and the Tenasserim Hills of southern Myanmar, adjacent parts of western Thailand and northern Peninsular Malaysia.

It is threatened by habitat loss.

The Oriental pied Hornbill is a nest competitor of the plain-pouched hornbill. They primarily nest in Tetrameles and fig trees.

It eats fruit, including mahogany and mulberries, and insects, especially cicadas and beetles.
