= Phu Kham mine =

Copper mine in Xaisomboun, Laos

Coordinates: 18.8824°N 102.9120°E

- Interactive map of Phu Kham mine
- Location: Xaisomboun Province, Laos
- Products: Copper

The Phu Kham mine is a large copper mine in the south of Laos in Xaisomboun Province. Phu Kham is one of the largest copper reserves in the world, having estimated reserves of 450 million tonnes of ore grading 0.54% copper, 3.46 million oz of gold, and 30.2 million oz of silver.
