= Hongsa coal mine =

Coal mine in Sainyabuli, Laos

Hongsa Coal Mine
- Location: Sainyabuli Province, Laos
- Products: Coking coal

The Hongsa Coal Mine is a coal mine in Sainyabuli Province. The mine has coal reserves amounting to 424 million tonnes of lignite, one of the largest coal reserves in the world. Annual production is estimated at 14.3 million tonnes per year.

The coal mine is located in the Hongsa Basin, next to the Laos–Thailand border near the village of Huai Kon. The basin covers a region between the rough latitudes of 19º 39' N and 19º 43' N and longitudes 101º14' E and 101º 24' E.

The mine is owned by the Hongsa Power Company, a joint venture between Lao Holding State Enterprise (20%) and Thai companies Banpu Power (40%) and Ratchaburi Electricity Generating Holding (40%). It is 80% Thai-owned. The Thai-Lao Lignite Company was granted a concession to build the project in 1994, but it was cancelled in September 2006, and a new contract awarded in November of that year to Banpu Power.

== Power plant ==
The Hongsa Mine Mouth Power Plant is a lignite power plant located at the mouth of the Hongsa Coal Mine. It is the only coal-fired power plant in Laos. Units 1 and 2 of the power plant were completed in 2015, and Unit 3 opened in 2016.

The power plant burns roughly 15 million tonnes of lignite per year, and produces 1878 MW of electricity, most of which is exported to Thailand. The power plant has been criticized for environmental and health impacts in both Laos and Thailand; in the four years since it began operations, Laos' carbon dioxide emissions grew approximately fivefold, and mercury pollution was detected in Thailand's Nan province. The power plant uses flue-gas desulfurization to remove sulfur dioxide from its exhaust.
