= Thagone mine =

Potash mine in Laos

- Location: Vientiane Province, Laos
- Products: Potash

The Thagone mine is a large potash mine in northern Laos in Vientiane Province. Thagone is one of the largest potash reserves in Laos having estimated reserves of 50.3 billion tonnes of ore grading 15% potassium chloride.
