= Nong Xun mine =

Tin mine in Laos

Coordinates: 17°57′10″N 104°31′35″E

- Interactive map of Nong Xun mine
- Location: Khammouane Province, Laos
- Products: tin

The Nong Xun mine is a large mine in the southern part of Laos in Khammouane Province. Nong Xun is one of the largest tin reserves in Laos, having estimated reserves of 29.4 million tonnes of ore grading 0.16% tin.
