= Savannakhet province =

Province of Laos

Savannakhet province ແຂວງ ສະຫວັນນະເຂດ
- Province
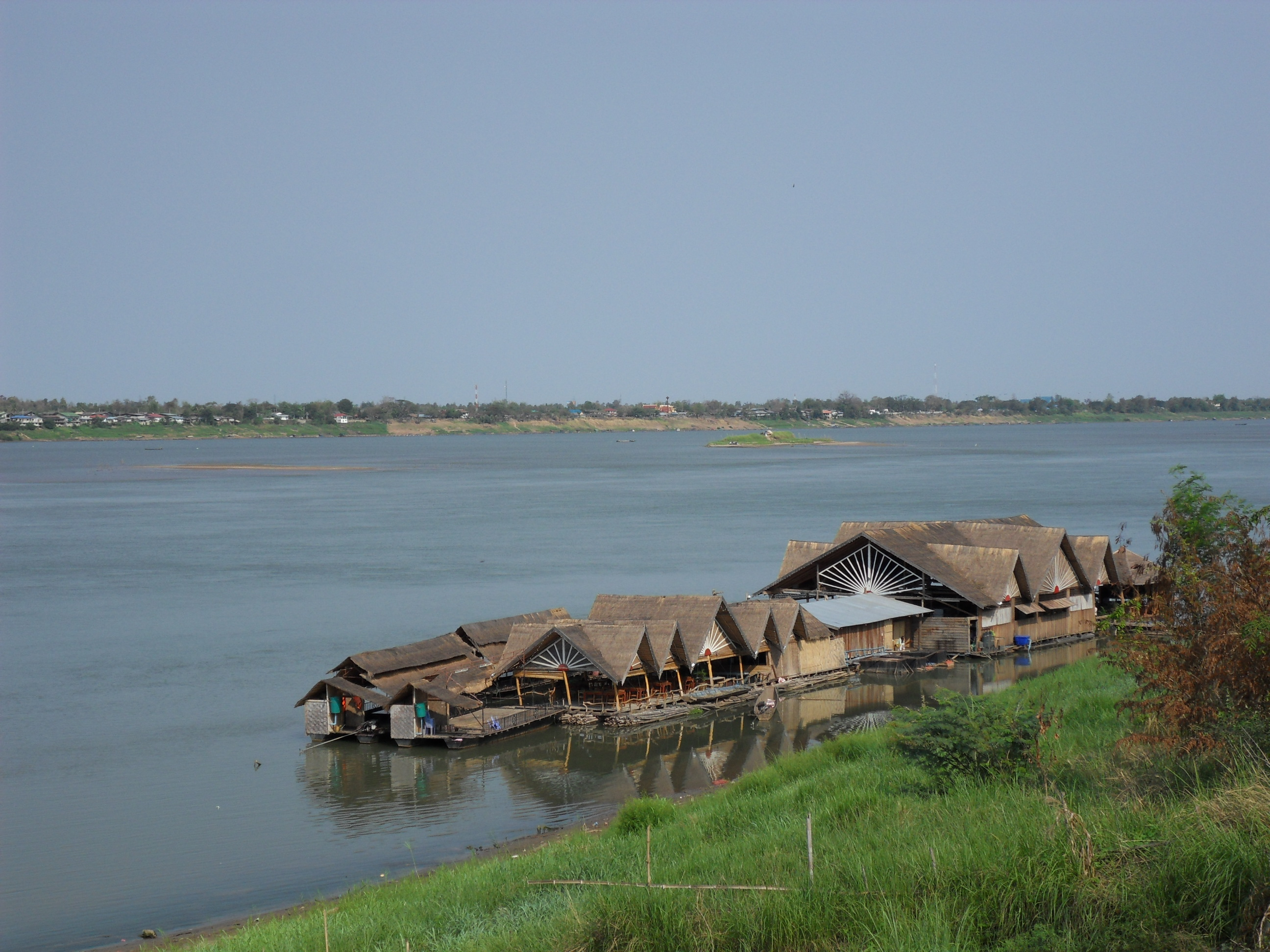
- A restaurant on the Mekong

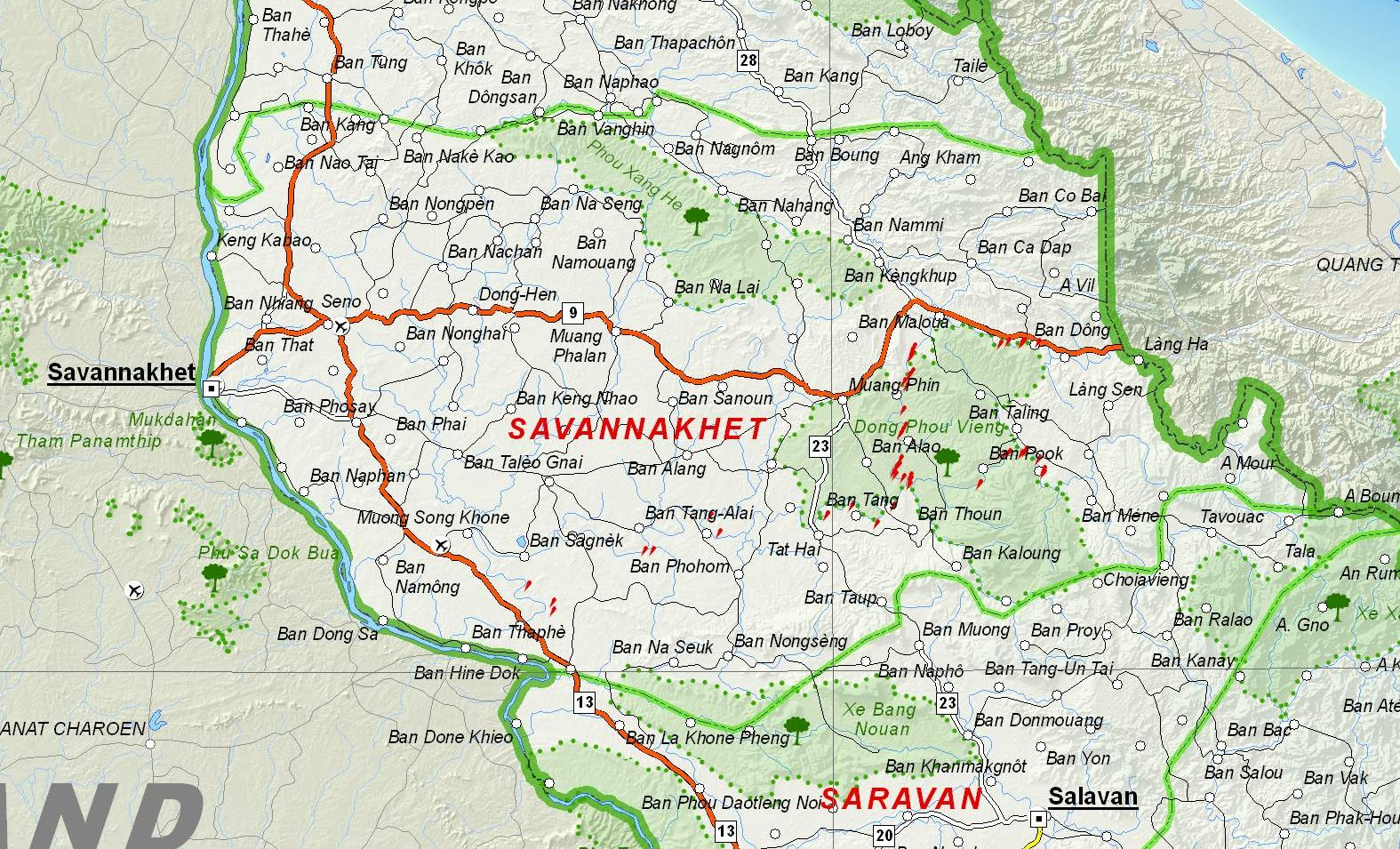
- Map of Savannakhet province

- Location of Savannakhet province in Laos
- Coordinates: 16.54°N 105.78°E
- Country: Laos
- Capital: Savannakhet

Area
  - Total: 21,774 km^{2} (8,407 sq mi)

Population (2020 census)
  - Total: 1,037,553
  - Density: 47.651/km^{2} (123.42/sq mi)
- Time zone: UTC+7 (ICT)
- ISO 3166 code: LA-SV
- HDI (2022): 0.578 medium · 14th

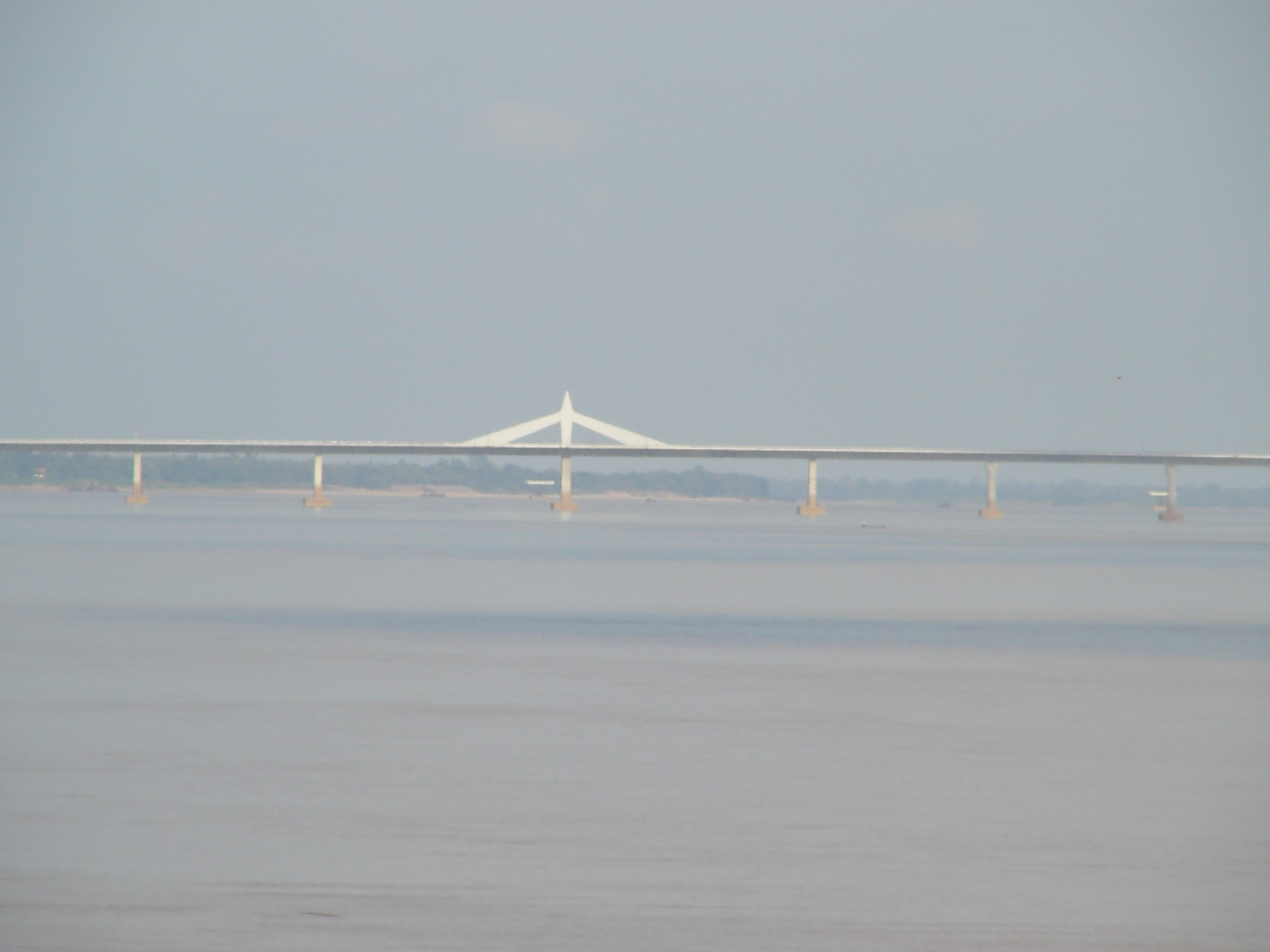
Second Thai–Lao Friendship Bridge

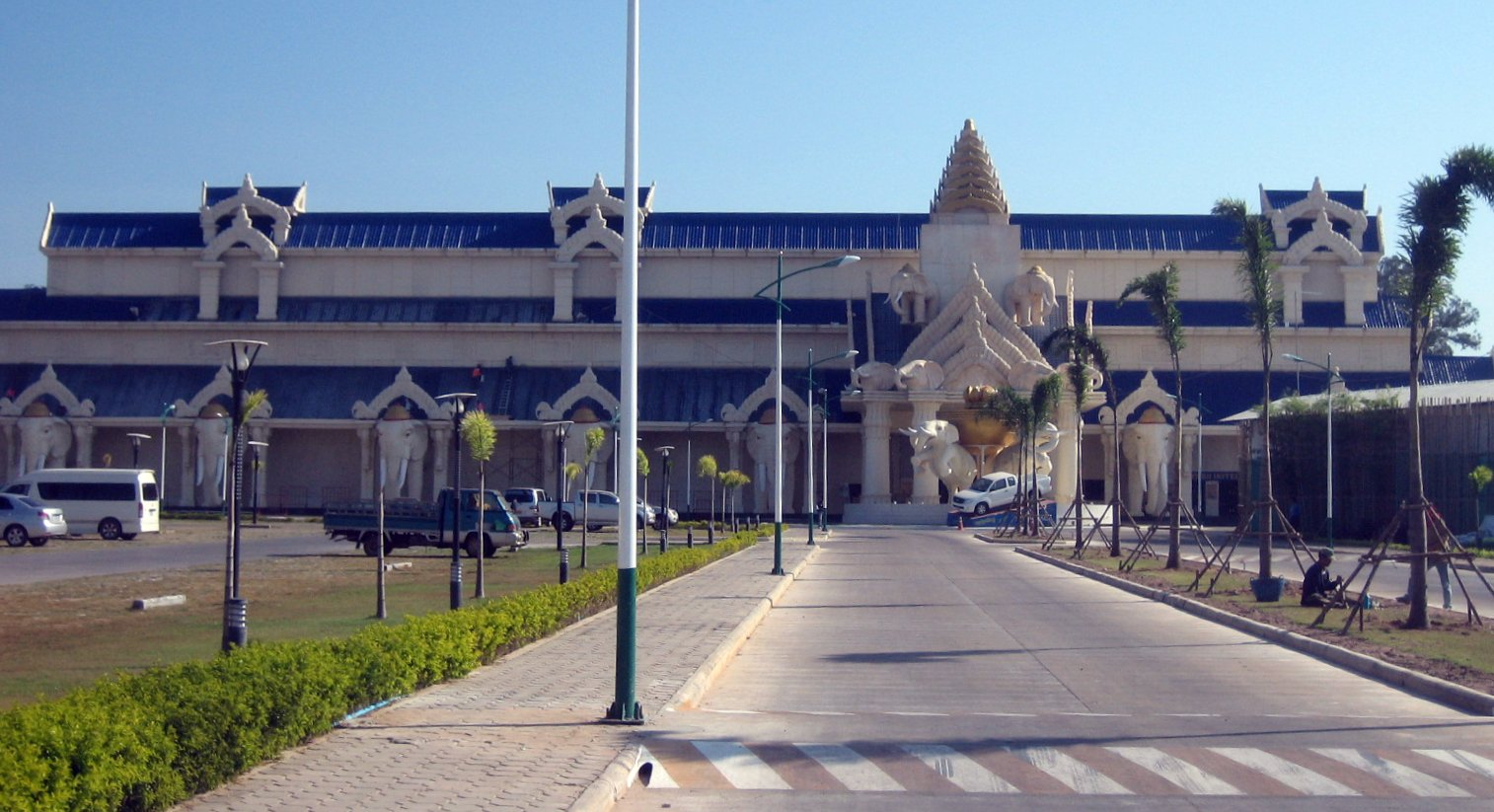
Savan-Vegas, a casino in Savannakhet City

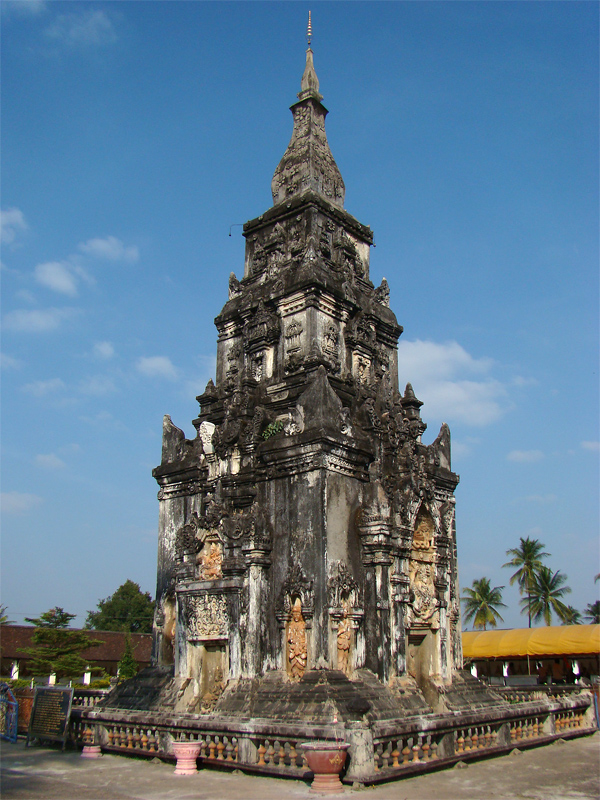
That Inghang

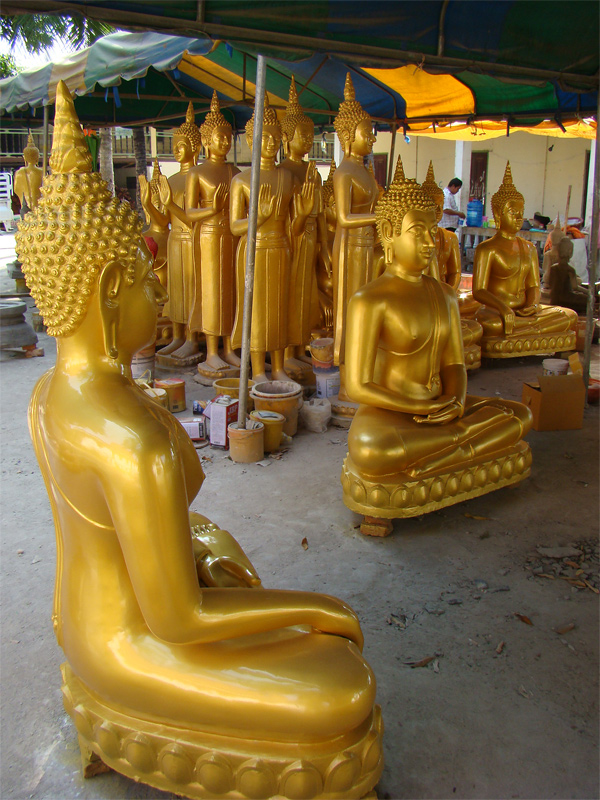
Buddha statues workshop, Wat Xayaphoum

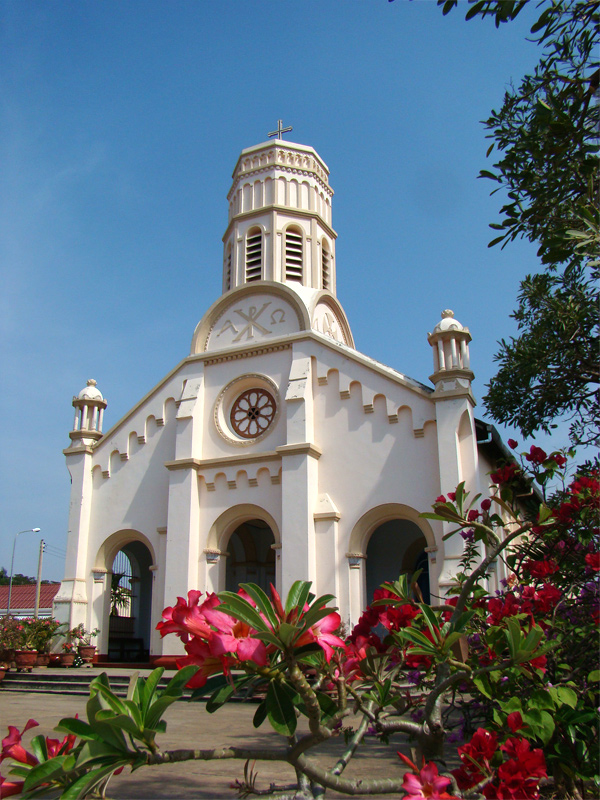
St Teresa's Catholic Church

Savannakhet (Lao: ສະຫວັນນະເຂດ, pronounced [sā.wǎn nā(ʔ).kʰȅːt]) is a province of Laos. The name of Savannakhet Province derives from old Pali-Sanskrit language, meaning “a field of gold”. The name follows from the province's previous name Savanh Nakhone ('heavenly district' or 'land of fertility suitable for agriculture'). The province is in the southern part of the country and is the largest province in Laos. It borders Khammouane province to the north, Quảng Trị and Thừa Thiên–Huế provinces of Vietnam to the east, Salavan province to the south, and Nakhon Phanom and Mukdahan provinces of Thailand to the west.

== Geography ==
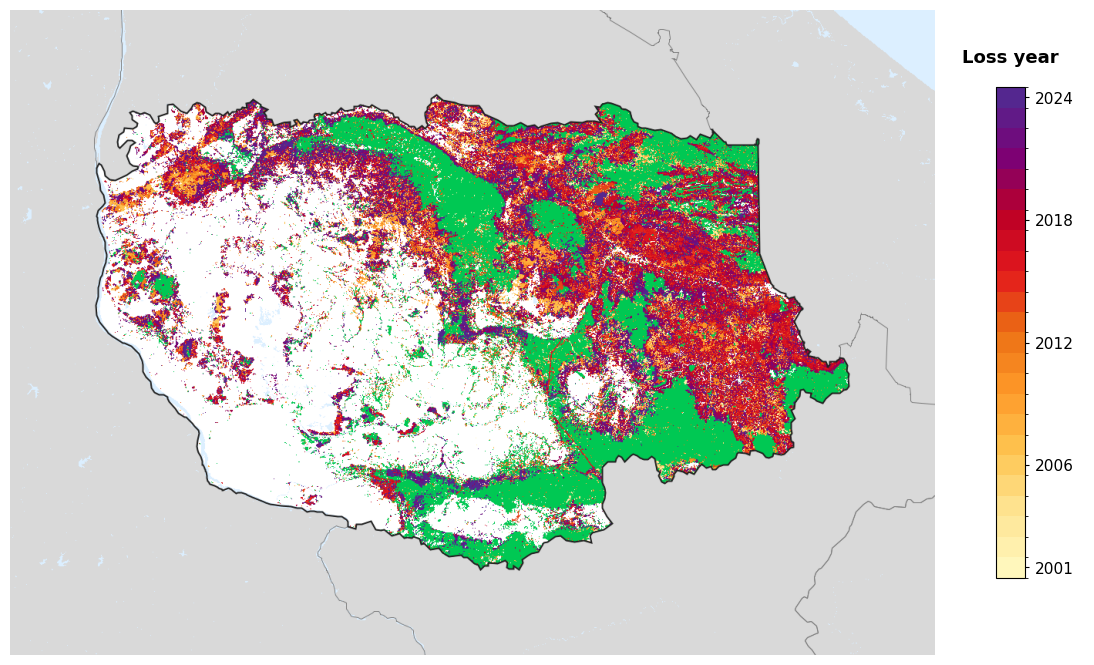
Tree-cover loss year in Savannakhet, 2001-2024, from the Global Forest Change dataset.

Savannakhet is the largest province, covering an area of 21,774 square kilometres (8,407 sq mi). The province borders Khammouan province to the north, Quảng Trị province and Huế city of Vietnam to the east, Salavan province to the south, and Nakhon Phanom and Mukdahan provinces of Thailand to the west. Settlements in the province include Savannakhet, Muong Song Khone, Ban Nhiang, Seno, Dong-Hen, Muang Phalan, Ban Sanoun, Muang Phin, Ban Dong, Ban Nammi, Ban Nao Tai.

The Second Thai–Lao Friendship Bridge over the Mekong connects Mukdahan province in Thailand with Savannakhet in Laos. The bridge is 1,600 metres (5,200 ft) long and 12 metres (39 ft) wide, with 2 traffic lanes.

=== Protected areas ===
Areas under protection in the province include Xe Bang Nouan National Biodiversity Conservation Area to the south, Dong Phou Vieng National Protected Area to the southeast, and Phou Xang He National Protected Area to the north. Phou Xang He has rocky mountain ranges, and is known for local Puthai culture. The Dong Phou Vieng is known for its forest with vegetation, a sacred lake and That Ing Hang Stupa; there are Eld's deer, silver langurs and hornbills.

=== Administrative divisions ===
The province is made up of the following 15 districts:

| Map | Code | Name | Lao script |
|---|---|---|---|
| | 13-01 | Kaysone Phomvihane (formerly Khanthabouly) | ໄກສອນ ພົມວິຫານ |
| | 13-02 | Outhoumphone District | ອຸທຸມພອນ |
| | 13-03 | Atsaphangthong District | ອາດສະພັງທອງ |
| | 13-04 | Phine District | ພີນ |
| | 13-05 | Seponh District | ເຊໂປນ |
| | 13-06 | Nong District | ນອງ |
| | 13-07 | Thapangthong District | ທ່າປາງທອງ |
| | 13-08 | Songkhone District | ສອງຄອນ |
| | 13-09 | Champhone District | ຈຳພອນ |
| | 13-10 | Xonboury District | ຊົນນະບູລີ |
| | 13-11 | Xayboury District | ໄຊບູລີ |
| | 13-12 | Viraboury District | ວີລະບຸລີ |
| | 13-13 | Assaphone District | ອາດສະພອນ |
| | 13–14 | Xayphouthong District | ໄຊພູທອງ |
| | 13–15 | Thaphalanxay District | ພະລານໄຊ |

== History ==
Prehistoric human occupation is evidenced by the first stone tools in the province, dating back between 100,000 and 12,000 years. The first bronze tools date to 2000 BCE. The region was then the center of the Sikhottabong Kingdom. The Pha That Sikhottabong stupa is on the grounds of a 19th-century monastery in Thakhek. Sikhottabong was a kingdom in Indo-China. Its capital was in the north-west of the province, in what later is the village of Meuang Kabong, on the eastern shores of the Banghiang River, about 10 kilometres (6.2 mi) east of the Mekong. Other centers of the kingdom were in Viang Chan, Khammuan, Nong Khai, and Udon. From the 7th to 10th century, the region was culturally and economically influenced by Champa, and then by that of Angkor until the 13th century. Khmer Empire ruins dating to 553 and 700 CE have been found at Heuan Hin.

In the 20th century, Savannakhet province was 1 of the seats of the struggle for independence. Prime Minister Kaysone Phomvihane originated in the province. The town was bombed and then occupied by Thai armed forces during the Franco-Thai War. During the Vietnam War, the eastern part of the province was crossed by the Ho Chi Minh trail. It was bombed by U.S. forces and loyalists. Some areas are still under the threat of unexploded ordnance. In 2007, the Second Thai–Lao Friendship Bridge was opened across the Mekong from Savannakhet to Mukdahan, Thailand. In April 2008, a chance discovery was made at Meuang Kabong consisting of 8.5 kilograms (19 lb) of gold and 18.7 kilograms (41 lb) of silver objects, and pillars and traces of brick walls. Missionaries came here, evidenced by a Catholic church in Savannakhet.

== Demographics ==
The population is 969,697 as of the 2015 census, spread over 15 districts. The ethnic minority groups residing in the province include Lao Loum, Phu Tai, Tai Dam, Katang, Mongkong, Vali, Lavi, Souei, Kapo, Kaleung and Ta Oi. In the 2000 census, 3 ethnic groups were listed: Lao Loum (Lowland Lao), Phu Tai, and Bru, the ones recognized by the provincial government. The Bru are a people with dialects and cultures.

== Economy ==
Sepon Mine, about 400 kilometres (250 mi) southeast of Vientiane, is the largest mine in Laos, with reserves of copper and gold. In the 1980s, Laotians panned for gold here using pieces of shrapnel and aircraft wreckage. Exploration occurred in 1990 by Australian mining company CRA, which was subsequently awarded a contract. It is later operated, and 90% owned by MMG Limited. Sepon became a foreign mining interest when it opened in 2002. Other mining companies operating in the province (2008) include: Wanrong Cement III, Lane Xang Minerals LTD (Vilabuly District), Lane Xang Minerals Ltd (Vilabuly District), Lao State Gypsum Mining Co Ltd (Champhone District), and Savan Gypsum Mining Co. (Champhone District).

Along with Bolikhamsai and Khammouane provinces, it is 1 of tobacco producing areas of Laos.

== Landmarks ==
Apart from the provincial capital, Savannakhet, which is a trading centre opposite to Mukhdahan town in Thailand, other places of interest in the town area are the Roman Catholic Church, a Vietnamese temple and school. Most of the buildings in the town are in the French architectural style of their colonial rule. In the Ban Nonglamchan Village in Champhone District, there is a library which contains a collection of manuscripts written in the Kham-Pali and Lao languages on palm leaves which are stated to be 200 years old. In Ban Tangvay Village of Xonbuly District, fossilized dinosaur bones found in 1930 are exhibited in the Dinosaur Exhibition Hall in Savannakhet. The Ho Chi Minh trail and remnants of American tanks and warplanes are on display in Phin District on Route 9, near the Lao Bao border check post.

Fossil sites

There are 5 fossil sites in the province. A Cretaceous fossil site is Tang Vay, 120 kilometres (75 mi) northeast of Savannakhet, which dates to 110 million years ago. The site was discovered by the geologist Josué Hoffet in 1936 and was explored by a team led by Philippe Taquet from the Muséum national d'histoire naturelle of Paris in the 1990s. He discovered tree fossils (Araucarioxylon hoffetti), turtles, and a sauropod, Tangvayosaurus hoffetti.

Museums

Fossils are exhibited in a dinosaur museum in Savannakhet.

Religious sites

The Wat Inghang temple, about 2000 years old, is located in the Ban Thad village. It was built to commemorate a visit of Lord Buddha when he was the guest of King Sumitatham of the Sikhottabong Kingdom. King Saysethathirath had the temple remodeled during 1548. It is approached by Route 9 between Savannakhet and Seno. An annual festival is held here on the first full moon of the lunar calendar.

The Wat Xayaphoum temple was built in 1542 in Xayaphoum village on the bank of the Mekong River during the period when Ban Thahir or Nakham temple was built. As the Buddhist centre and largest monastery in Laos, its arts and architecture are dated to the earliest Savannakhet period. The temple has a garden with trees surrounding it. There is a workshop near the entrance from the river side where golden Buddha statues are made. Pimai Lao festival is held in the province and boat racing is an event.

Heuan Hin ("stone house") is a shrine in Ban Dongdokmay. It was built during the Khmer regime in honour of their Sikhottabong Kingdom. The stone house is located 15 kilometres (9.3 mi) from Xayphouthong District, or 66 kilometres (41 mi) from Khanthabuly.

The That Phon Stupa was built during the period of 557 to 700. The festival held here during the first full moon of the lunar calendar marks tribute to Phra Sghiva and some Hindu gods.

St Teresa's Catholic Church is situated in Savannakhet's main square. Built in 1930, it consists of masonry walls and an octagonal spire.
