= Nahe mine =

Potash mine in Laos

- Location: Khammouane Province, Laos
- Products: Potash

The Nahe mine is a large potash mine in southern Laos in Khammouane Province. Nahe represents one of the largest potash reserves in Laos having estimated reserves of 226 million tonnes of ore grading 17.5% potassium chloride.
