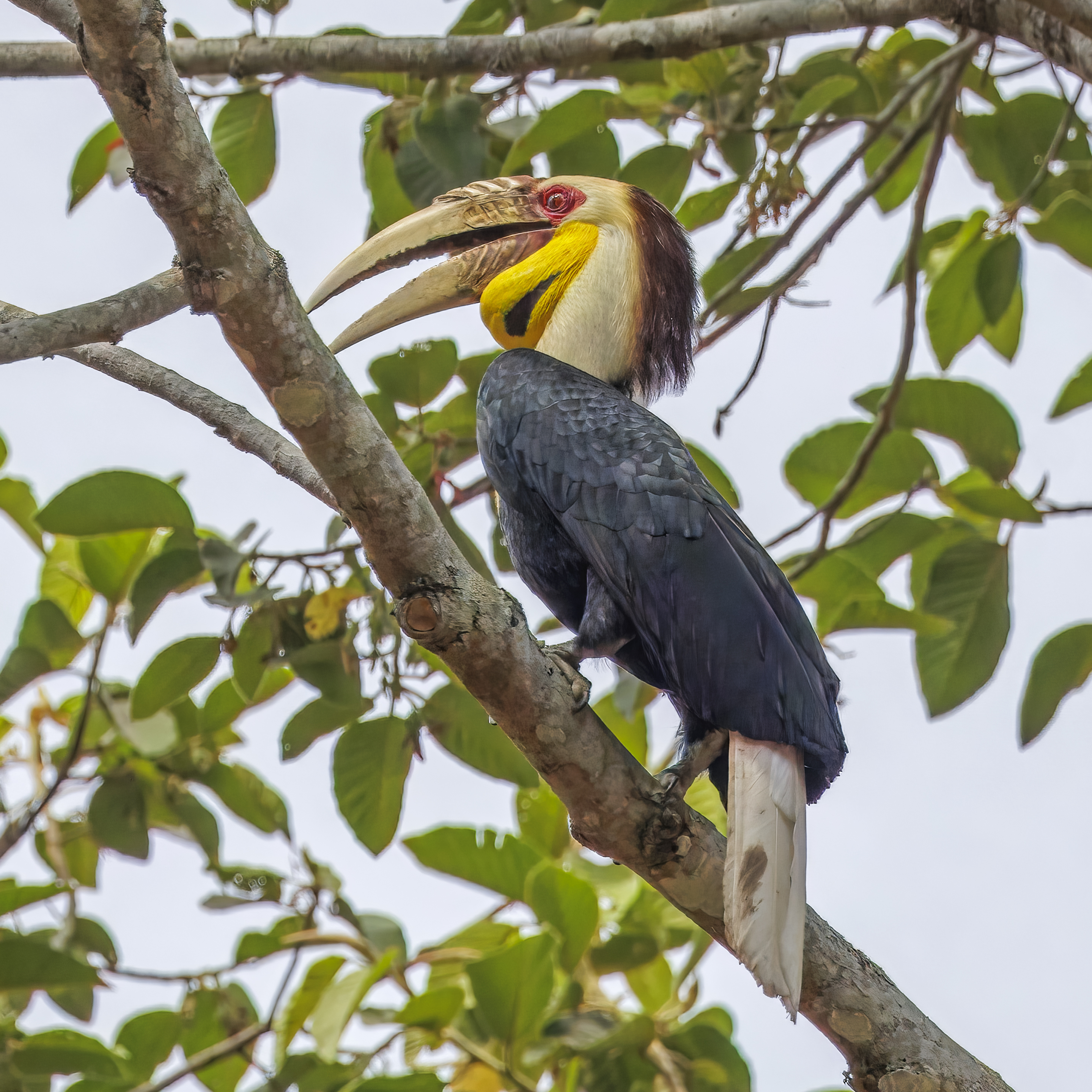
- Male
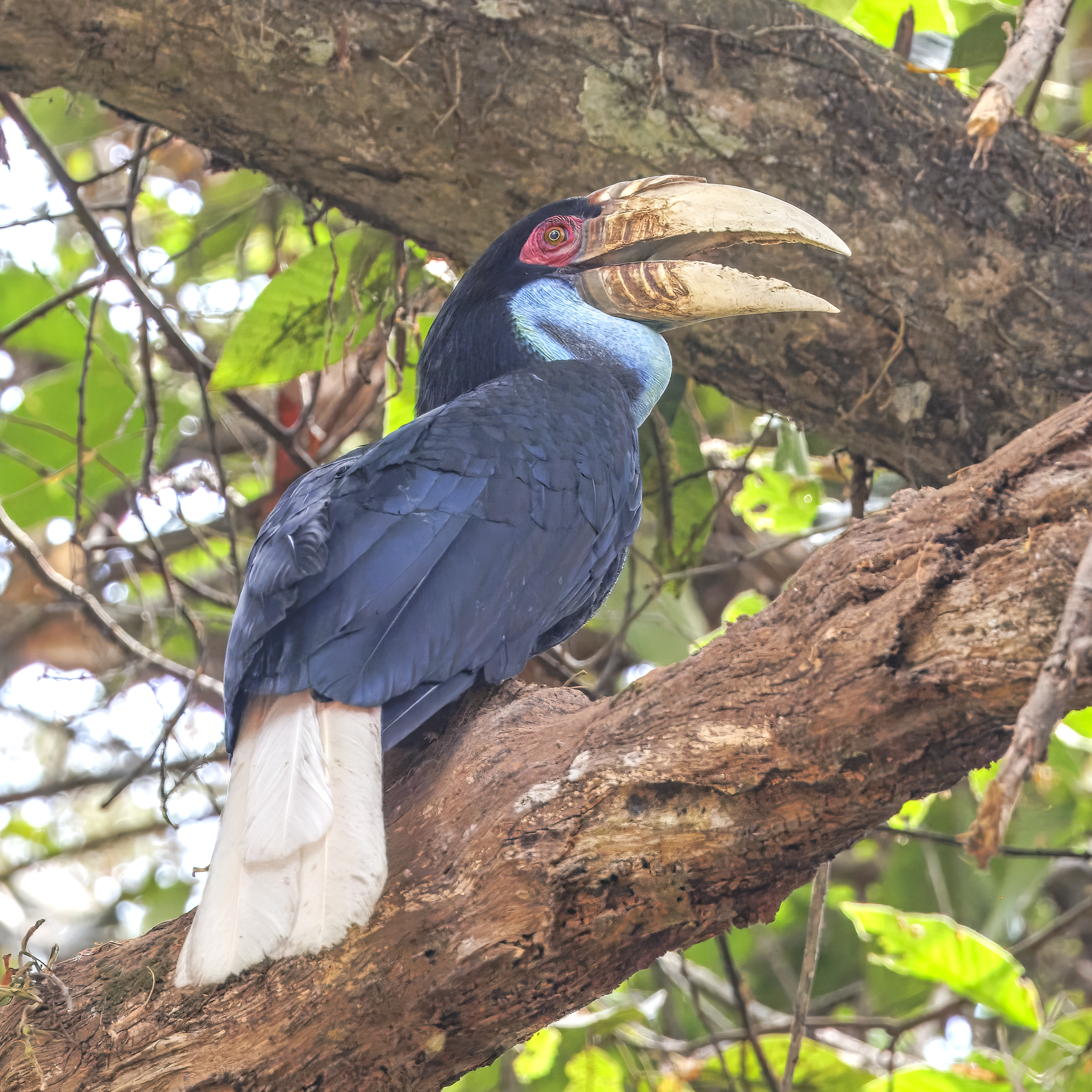
- Female both at Angkor Wat, Cambodia

Conservation status
- Vulnerable (IUCN 3.1)
- CITES Appendix II

Scientific classification
- Kingdom: Animalia
- Phylum: Chordata
- Class: Aves
- Order: Bucerotiformes
- Family: Bucerotidae
- Genus: Rhyticeros
- Species: R. undulatus

Binomial name
- Rhyticeros undulatus (Shaw, 1812)

Synonyms
- Aceros undulatus

= Wreathed hornbill =

Species of bird

The wreathed hornbill (Rhyticeros undulatus) is an Old World tropical bird of the hornbill family Bucerotidae, also called bar-pouched wreathed hornbill due to its distinctive blue-black band on its lower throat sac. It is named after its characteristic long, curved bill that develops ridges, or wreaths, on the casque of the upper mandible in adults. Males are black with a rufous crown, a white upper breast and face, and a yellow featherless throat. Females are uniformly black with a blue throat and are slightly smaller than males.

The wreathed hornbill ranges across the foothills and evergreen forests of Northeast India and Bhutan to Bangladesh, Southeast Asia and the Greater Sunda Islands. It is a frugivore and feeds mainly on large fruits, which it swallows whole leaving the seeds intact. This feeding behaviour plays an important ecological role for the long-distance seed dispersal in forest ecosystems.

The wreathed hornbill is threatened by hunting, habitat fragmentation and deforestation. It has been listed as Vulnerable on the IUCN Red List since 2018, as the global population is estimated to decrease due to these threats.

== Taxonomy ==
English ornithologist George Shaw first described the species in 1812 as Buceros undulatus, based on a zoological specimen collected in Java. It was placed in the genus Rhytidoceros by Daniel Giraud Elliot in 1882; in Rhyticeros by Allan Octavian Hume in 1878; and in Aceros by James L. Peters in 1931.

The wreathed hornbill is a monotypic taxon and is widely recognized as a member of Rhyticeros, the genus of hornbills with low wreathed casques. Analysis of the mitochondrial genomes of eight hornbill species revealed that the wreathed hornbill is closely related with Aceros and the Visayan hornbill (Penelopides panini).

== Description ==
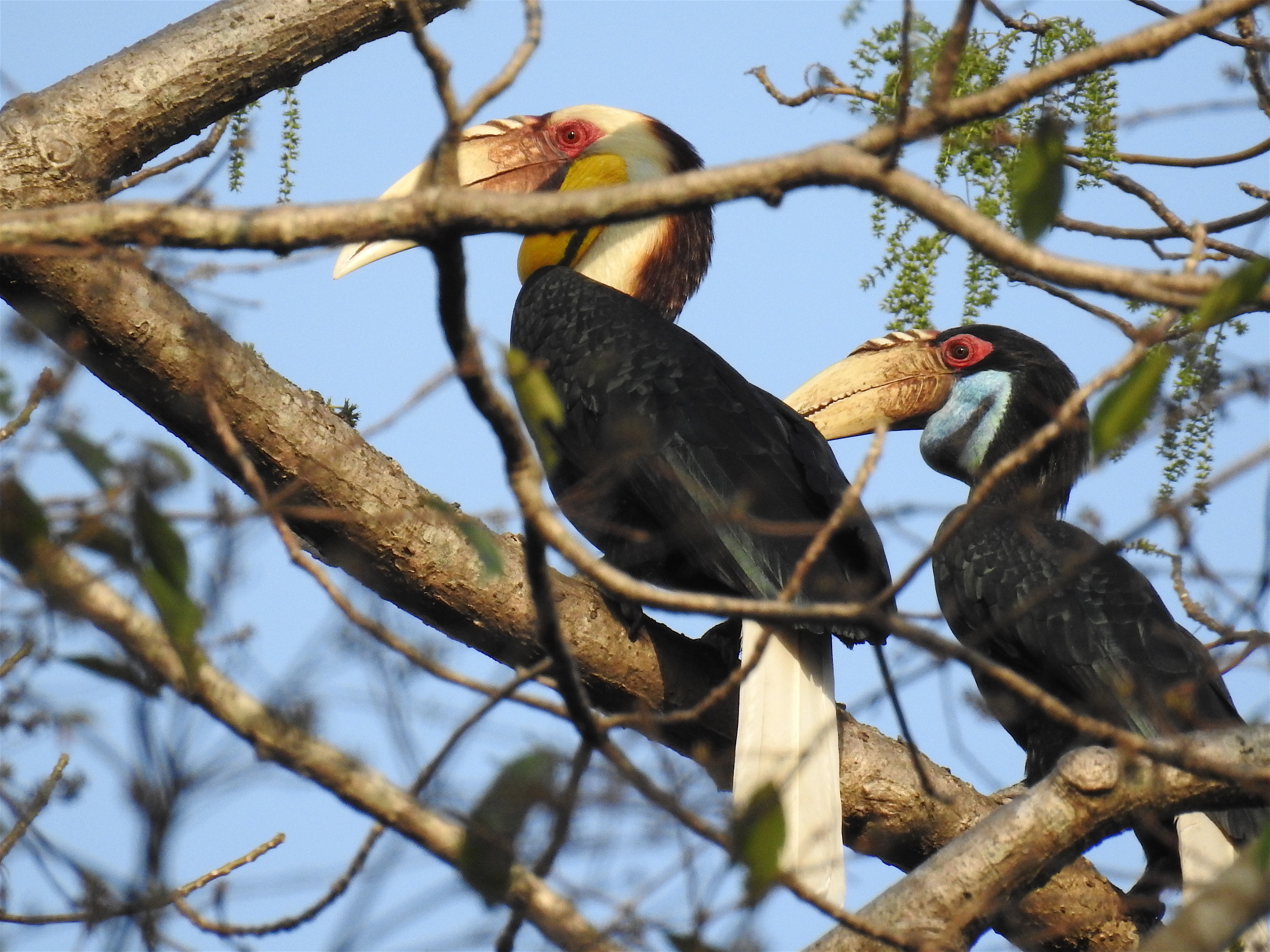
Pair of adult wreathed hornbills in Pakke Tiger Reserve

The wreathed hornbill is black with black legs and feet, but has a pale yellow bill, bare reddish skin around the eyes, a black band around the gular skin and a white tail. The female's gular skin is blue, whereas the male's is bright yellow; his neck is white and his nape dark reddish passing into black. Sexual dimorphism in the colouration of plumage and inflatable gular skin is less pronounced in young wreathed hornbills, but becomes more apparent as both sexes mature.

It is a medium-sized bird with a body length of 75 to 90 cm (30 to 35 in); adult males weigh from 1.68 to 3.65 kg (3.7 to 8.0 lb), and females weigh from 1.36 to 2.69 kg (3.0 to 5.9 lb).

=== Bill morphology ===
All members of the hornbill family have large, heavy bills with characteristic casques that distinguish them from other avian taxa. Hornbill casques contain foamy air-filled cavities surrounded by multiple layers of keratin tiles that act as an external shell. The extra weight of the casque is supported by the fusion of the first two vertebrae.

The bill has distinctive serrated casques near the base of the upper mandible, which are particularly unique because of its ridges. As the birds mature, forward growth causes the foremost ridge to break off. It is hypothesized that specialized casque characteristics evolved due to multiple selection pressures, including its use for vocalization enhancement, physical pounding, mating displays, and as visual cues for age and social status.

== Distribution and habitat ==
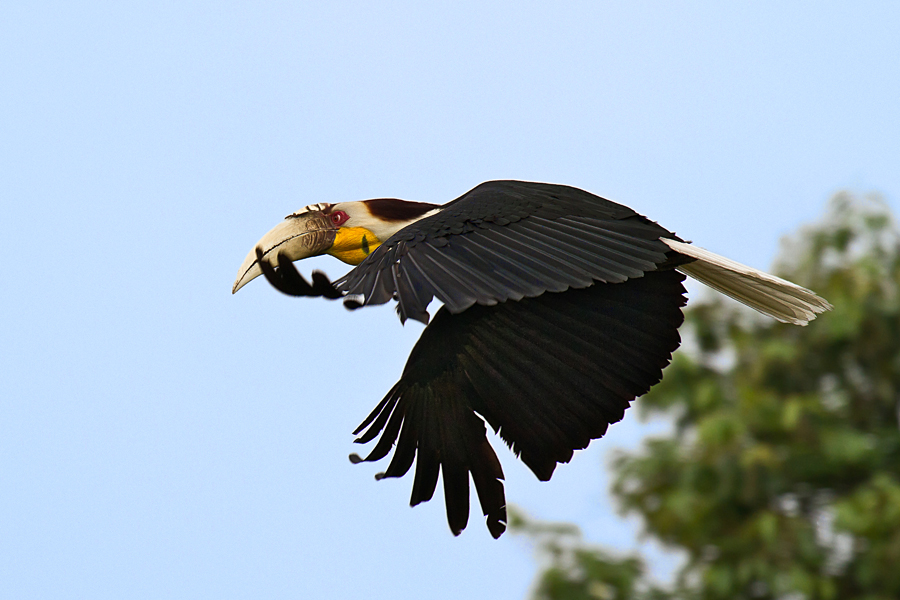
A wreathed hornbill in flight

The wreathed hornbill inhabits tropical evergreen forests in the region from southern Bhutan, Northeast India, Bangladesh and through mainland Southeast Asia to Indonesia, where it is restricted to Sumatra, Java, Borneo and a few smaller islands. It has been recorded up to an elevation of 2,560 m (8,400 ft).

In Bhutan, two individuals were sighted in Sarpang district in spring 1986.

In Northeast India, it inhabits unlogged primary forests and selectively logged forests in the foothills of the Eastern Himalayas from Nameri National Park in Assam to Namdapha National Park in Arunachal Pradesh. During the breeding season, it lives in lowland areas, but migrates to higher elevations in the non-breeding season.

In Myanmar, 62 wreathed hornbills were sighted in the Mali River valley at elevations of 800–2,500 m (2,600–8,200 ft) in winter 1999. A flock of about 50 individuals was sighted in Hponkanrazi Wildlife Sanctuary in September 2004.

== Behaviour and ecology ==
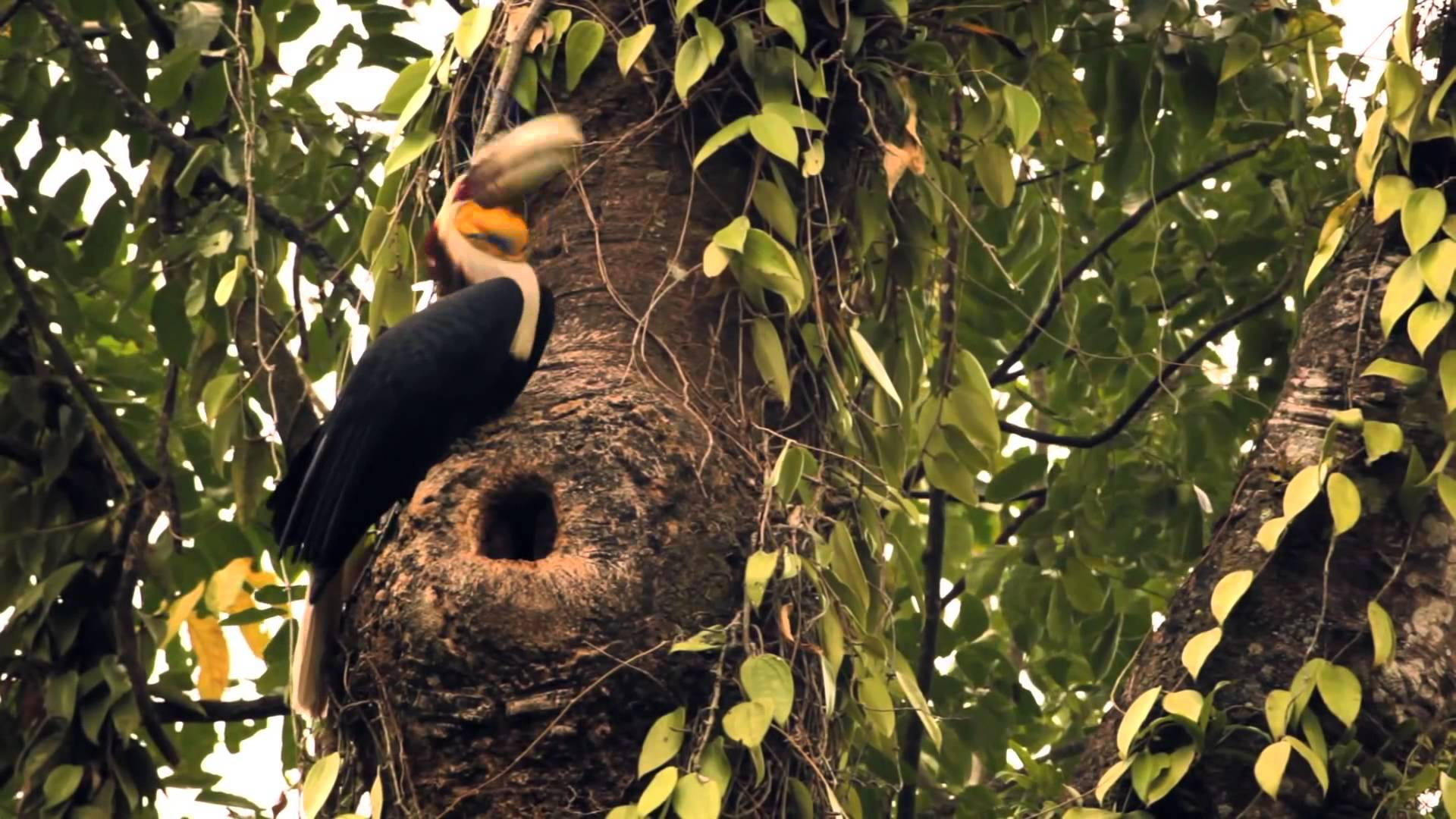
Wreathed hornbill at its nest

The wreathed hornbill is a social bird and most active in the early mornings when foraging for fruits; 21 individuals studied in Pakke Tiger Reserve during the non-breeding season rested at midday and resumed activity in the early afternoons.

It lives in larger flocks than other hornbill species and remains in groups during both breeding and non-breeding seasons. Flock size observed in Namdapha National Park ranged from a mean of 4.7 to 6.6 individuals with a density of 1.3 birds/km^{2} (3.4 birds/sq mi) in March and April to 68 birds/km^{2} (180 birds/sq mi) in December. In Arunachal Pradesh, the wreathed hornbill density is much lower in habitats where local people hunt, ranging from 2.9 to 9.02 birds/km^{2} (7.5 to 23.4 birds/sq mi).

It travels long distances to forage for fruit, sometimes flying between islands, but it does not migrate. A male wreathed hornbill was fitted with a GPS tracking unit in Pakke Tiger Reserve during the breeding season; it moved a mean minimum daily distance of 24.8 km (15.4 mi) and dispersed seeds for up to 10.8 km (6.7 mi) from its nesting site.

Home ranges of the wreathed hornbill and other hornbill species overlap in several range countries.

=== Vocalizations ===
The main call of the wreathed hornbill is a loud double yelp that has been described to sound like "coo-cuk" or "wuff-wurff". This call is short and typically repeated in a sequence of three or more from a perching position or during flight. The second part of the call is higher pitched and louder than the first and can be heard from farther distances. When calling, the wreathed hornbill displays its brightly coloured throat sac by sharply thrusting its head backwards and upwards. This movement is thought to be a form of communication between individuals. It makes various other low-pitched, bisyllabic barking sounds.

=== Diet and feeding ===
The wreathed hornbill mainly feeds on large fruit with figs making up the majority of its diet. It consumes more drupaceous fruits than other hornbill species. It also occasionally eats small animals like insects, crabs, snails and reptiles, particularly during the breeding season. It forages in the forest canopy across its range, sometimes descending to eat small prey or to retrieve fallen fruit. Tropical fruit abundance can greatly vary by location and season, therefore the wreathed hornbill flies long distances to track areas with high fruit availability. As it moves across its range, it disperses the consumed seeds. The seed dispersal behaviour of the wreathed hornbill plays a critical role in maintaining tropical forest diversity.

The feeding technique used by the wreathed hornbill is called ballistic food transport. It holds the large food item at the tip of its bill and throws its head back quickly, swallowing it whole. This behaviour is likely to reduce resource competition by exploiting fruit that is too large for smaller frugivores. Another advantage to ballistic food transport is that the fruit seeds are protected from damage when they are swallowed whole. The entire seed passes through the gastrointestinal tract and is excreted intact, increasing its chances of germination and forming a new plant.

=== Reproduction ===
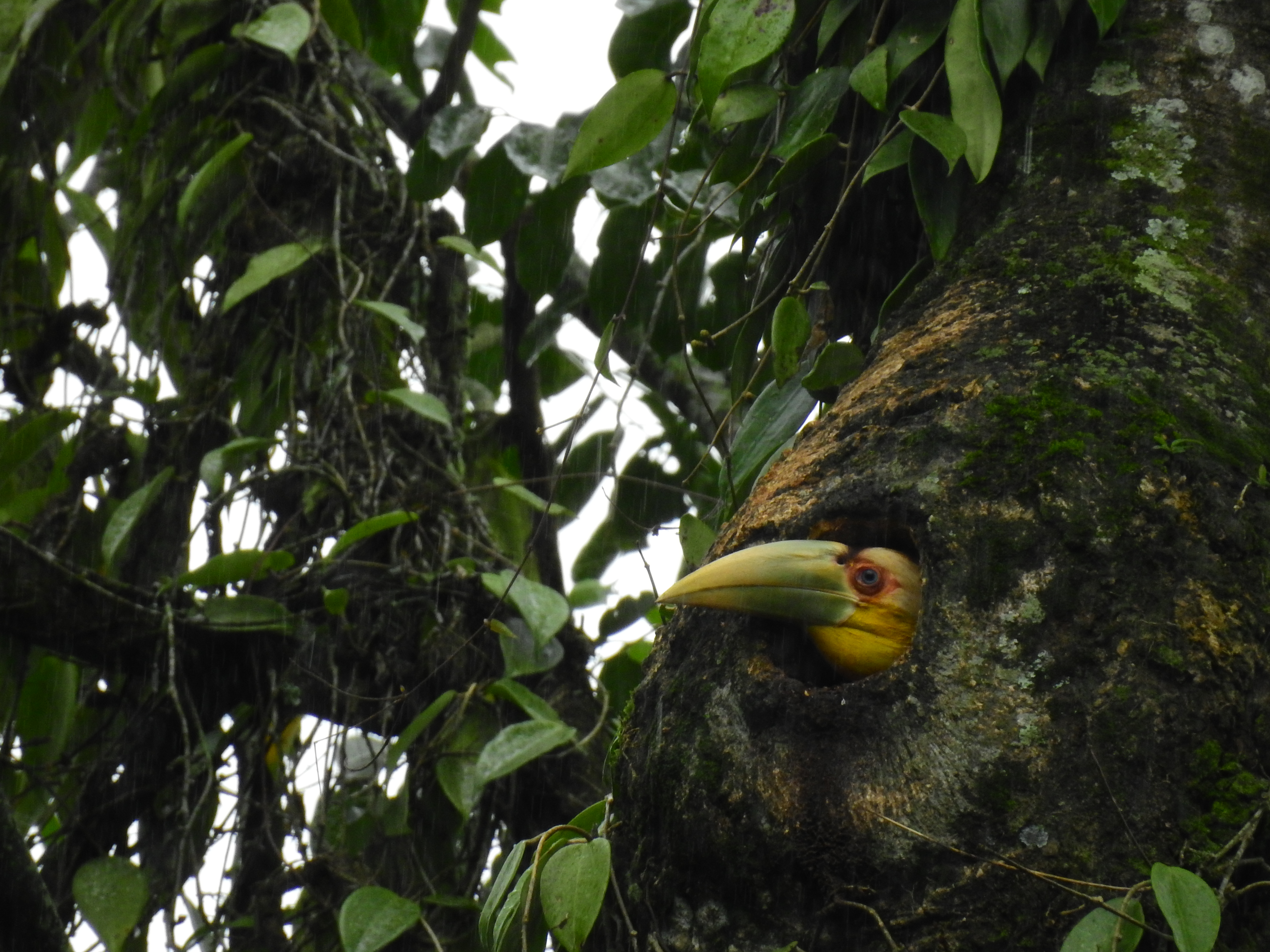
Wreathed hornbill emerges from its nest

The wreathed hornbill is a monogamous breeder that demonstrates biparental care. It nests in the cavities of large trees located in coastal forests, illegally logged areas, or among foothills up to an elevation of 2,560 m (8,400 ft). It searches for existing oval-shaped tree cavities for nesting because it cannot excavate its own. The nest height ranges from 18 to 28 m (59 to 92 ft) above ground. Females use droppings or mud to cover the nest hole to protect the clutch and fledglings from predators but leave a gap large enough for males to deliver food. They unload the mud when they need to leave the nest.

The average clutch size of the wreathed hornbill is 1–3 eggs, which the female incubates and guards alone for 40 days. She raises only one of the chicks and remains with it in the nest until it fledges at the end of the nesting cycle, which lasts 111–137 days. Both parents remain with the juvenile for multiple months after it has left the nest.

== Threats ==
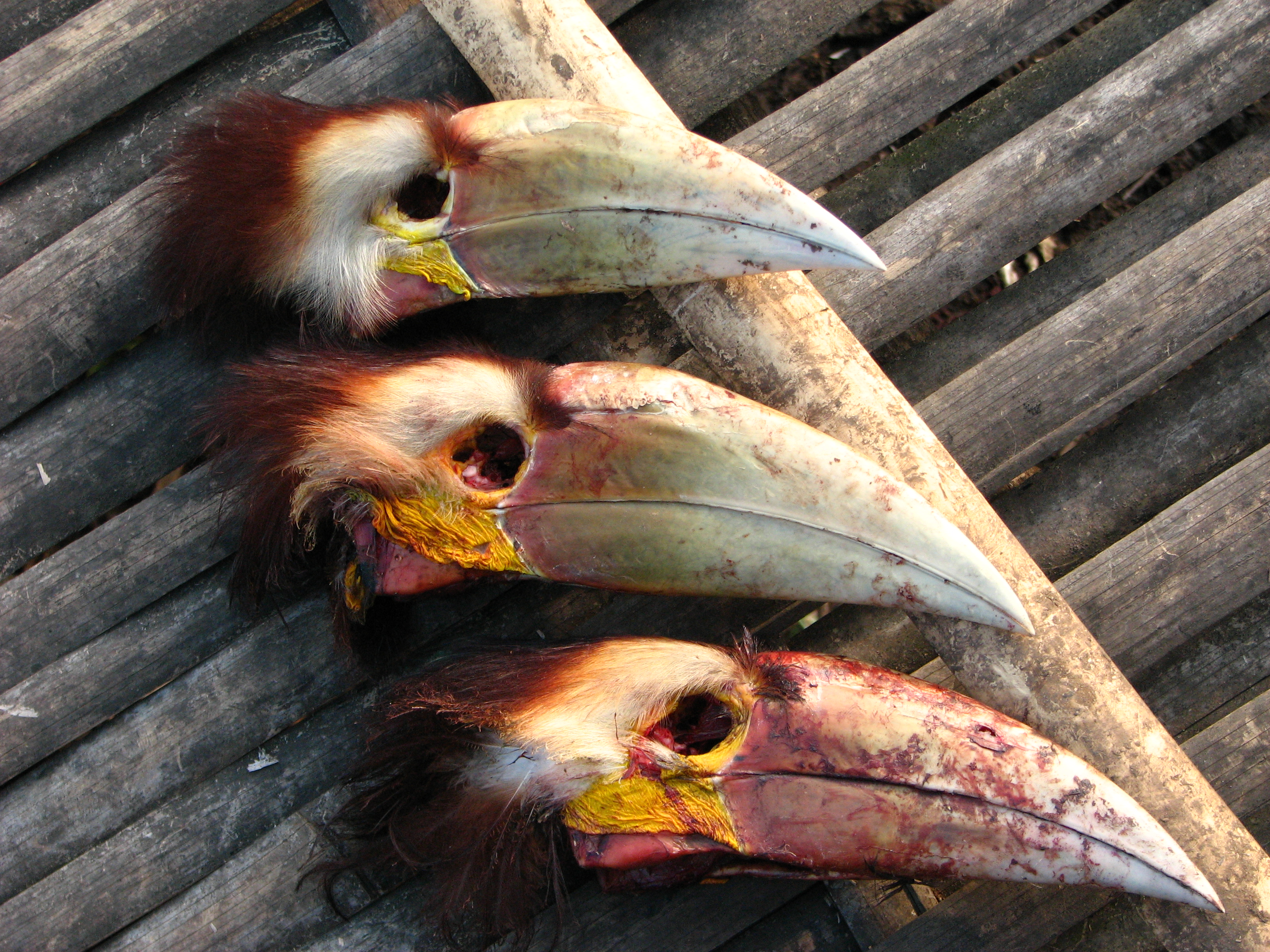
Wreathed hornbill heads in Dibang Valley

Major threats to wreathed hornbill populations include hunting, use of pesticides, illegal logging and habitat fragmentation. In Arunachal Pradesh, the local Mishmi and Adi people shoot 50–70 wreathed hornbills during the migratory season; they eat their meat, use their gizzards as medicine to cure stomach problems, their feathers to decorate their homes and their casques to adorn their headgear. Local people also hunt wreathed hornbills for sport and use their fat for medical purposes.

The wreathed hornbill has been listed as a vulnerable species on the IUCN Red List since 2018, as these threats will likely lead to a decline of the global population in the near future.

== Conservation ==
The wreathed hornbill is internationally protected under CITES Appendix II and is a Class II national protected species in China.

In Pakke Tiger Reserve, a community-based Hornbill Nest Adoption Program was initiated in collaboration with the Arunachal Pradesh Forest Department in 2011; local Nyishi people from nine villages worked as nest protectors and one youth as field coordinator; more than 90 urban citizens supported the project financially. In the breeding seasons of 2012 and 2013, the nest protectors located eight wreathed hornbill nests, of which two had fledglings.
