= Energy in Laos =

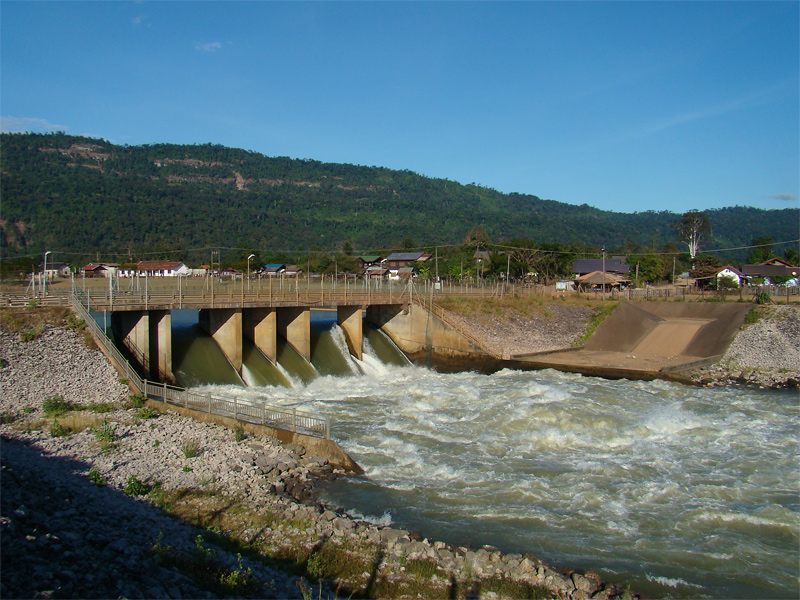
Laos generates most of its electricity from hydropower. This is Theun Hinboun Hydropower station in Khammouane Province

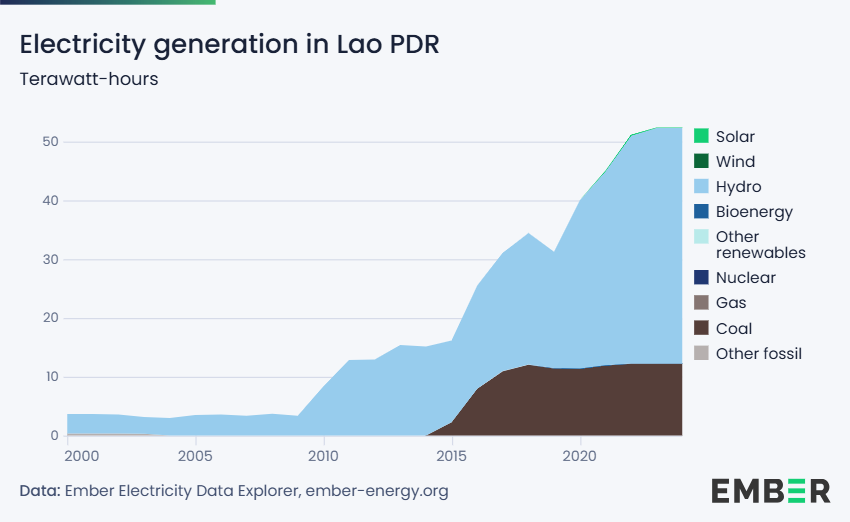
Electricity generation in Laos in terawatt-hours

This page describes energy and electricity production, consumption and export in Laos. In 2023, Laos' energy mix was made up of 38% coal and 34% hydropower, the rest coming from biofuels, oil, or other renewables such as solar energy (although they comprised only 351TJ in 2023, compared to over 155,000TJ for coal energy sources). In terms of electricity generated, 80% comes from hydropower in 2023. 75% of the electricity generated in Laos is exported, which earned the country the name of "battery of Southeast Asia". In 2024, electricity accounted for 15.35% of Laos' total exports, and is mostly exported to China, Vietnam, and Thailand. The state-owned electricity company, Électricité du Laos, sells electricity domestically for less than the cost of production. Due to their growing export market, the Laos energy sector generated 12.8% of the nation's GDP in 2022.

== Fossil fuel ==
The Hongsa Thermal Power Station is an 1,878MW coal-fired power station in Hongsa District, Sainyabuli Province. It is a "mine mouth" facility, fueled by lignite from an adjacent mine. Its three power generating units came on line in 2015–2016. Between 2004 and 2014, 100% of the electricity generated in Laos came from hydropower.

In February 2021, the Lao government announced that two more lignite-fired power plants will constructed in Sekong Province. Work began in 2021 and be completed by 2025. The electricity generated will be sold to Cambodia for 7.2 US cents per kWh. The first plant will be built by Phonesack Group in Kaleum District. It will have an installed capacity of 1,800MW. The company will invest between US$3–4 billion, including the construction of transmission lines to export electricity to Cambodia. The second coal-fired, 700 MW plant will be built in La Mam District by a Chinese company that will invest over US$1 billion in the project. The government claims that coal reserves adjacent to the plants are sufficient to power the plants for the entire 25-year concession period.

=== Environmental impact ===
The combustion of fossil fuels, particularly coal, is the main contributing factor to the increase in carbon dioxide (CO_{2}) emissions in Laos. Laos's CO_{2} emissions increased more sharply in 2015 when their first coal-fired power station came online. The CO_{2} to

GDP intensity increased by 9.8% per year, from 68 kg CO_{2} per thousand US dollars PPP to 278 kg CO_{2} per thousand US dollars PPP. As of 2021, despite cheap and plentiful hydropower electricity production, Laos continues to build more coal-fired power stations.

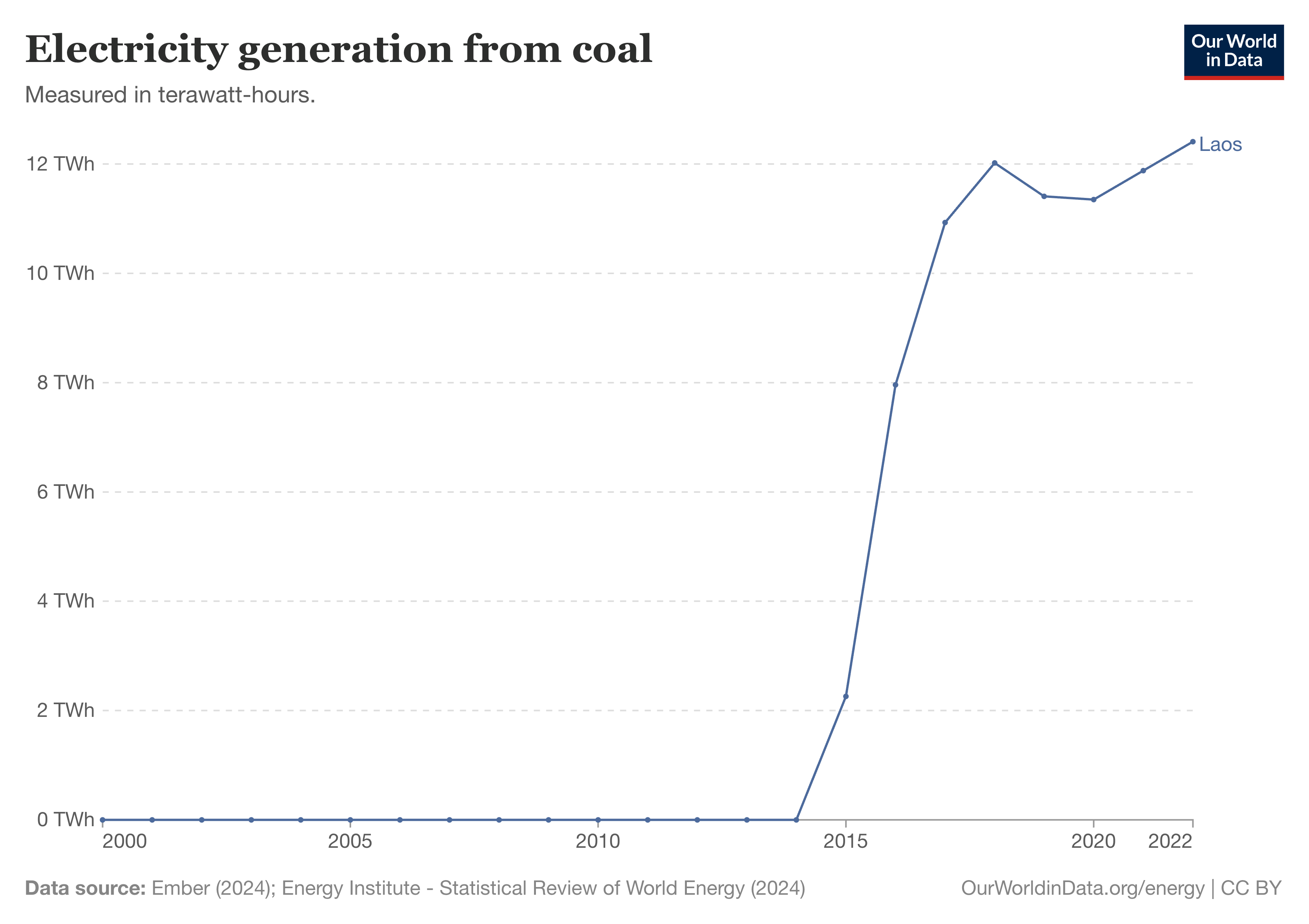
The first coal-fired power station in Laos was built in 2015

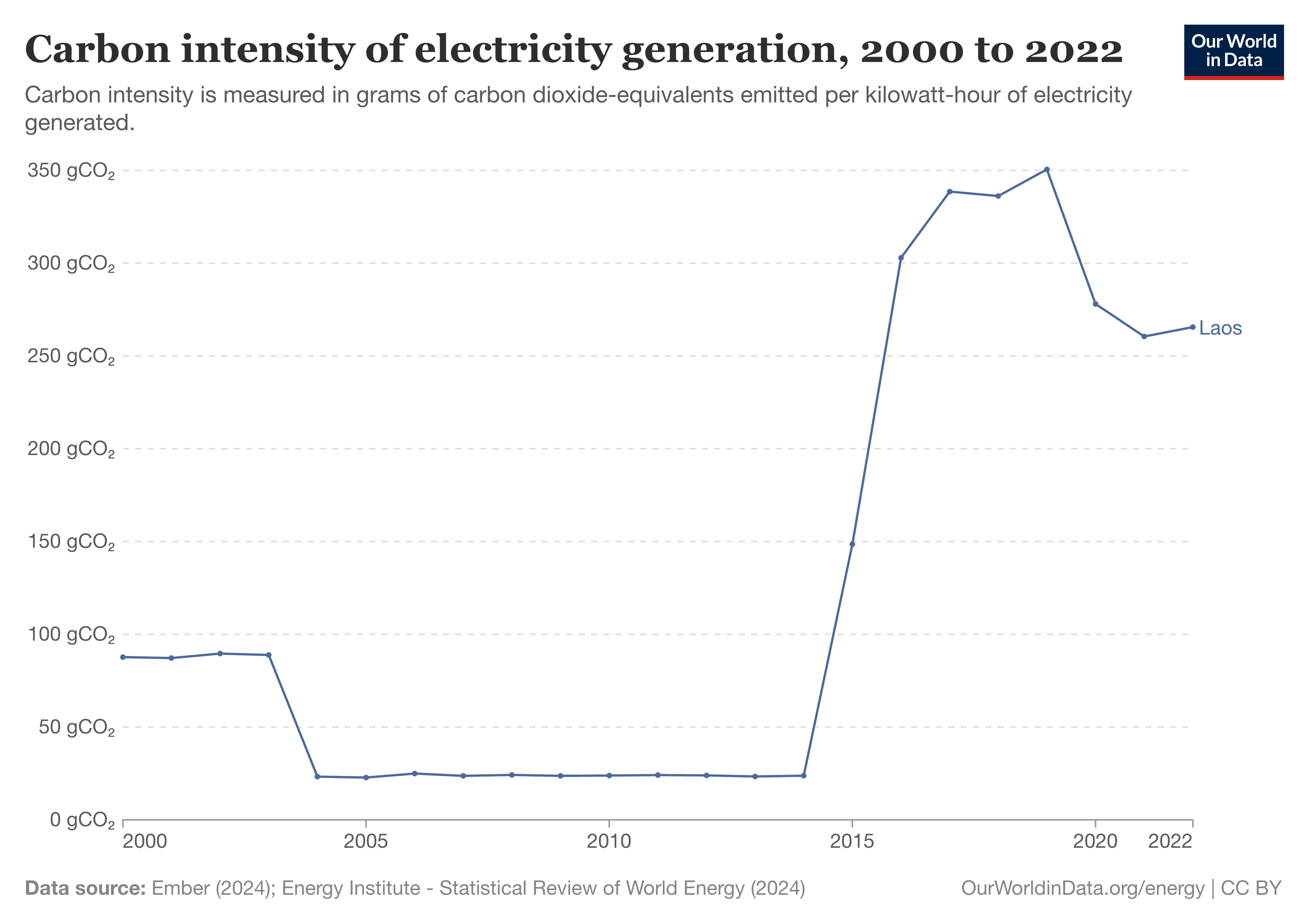
New coal-fired power stations have caused a marked increase in the carbon intensity of electricity generation in Laos

== Hydropower ==
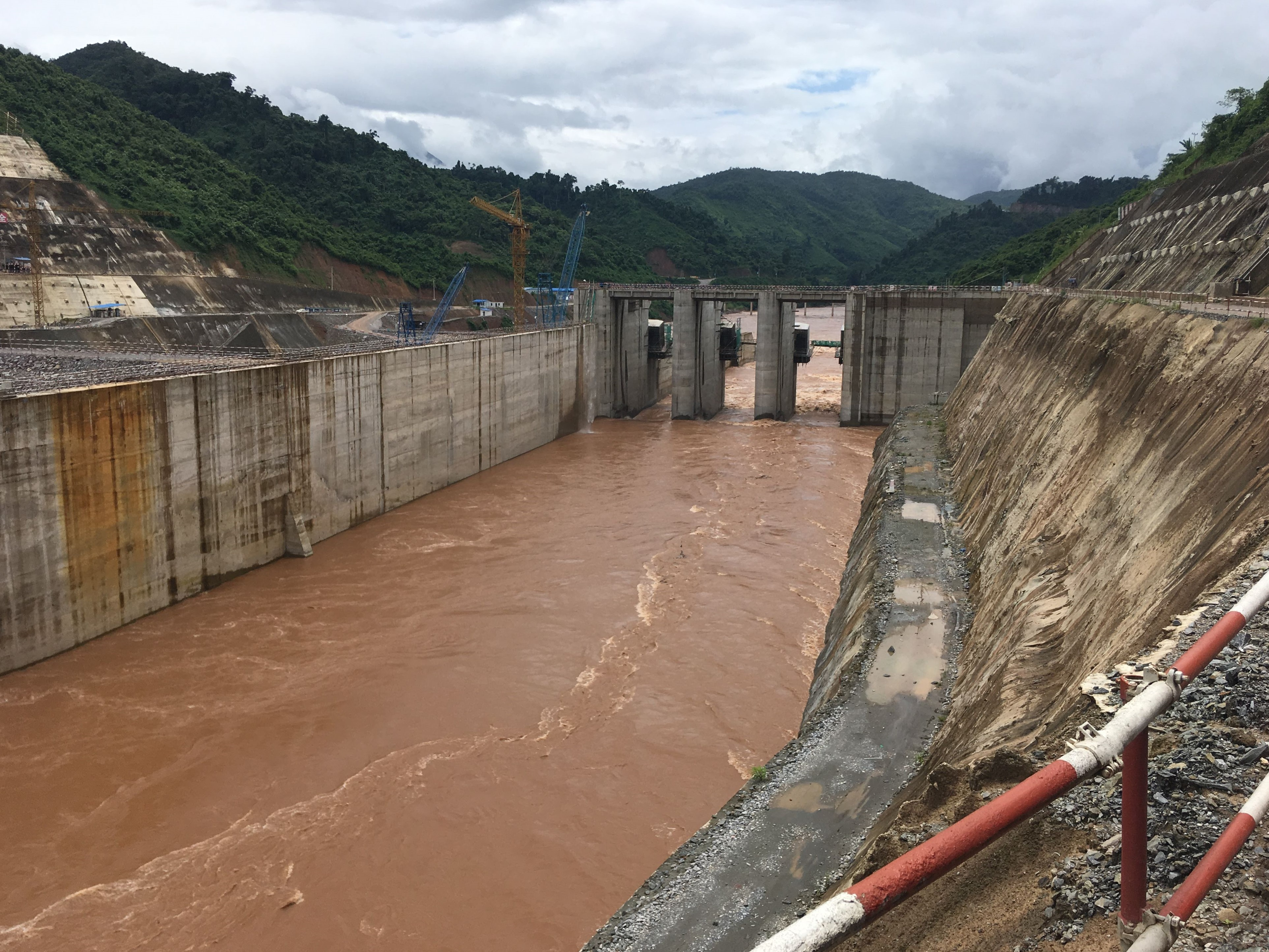
The Nam Ou 3 Dam under construction in 2018

In 2010, Laos petitioned the Mekong River Commission (MRC) to approve their proposal for 11 new dams. This move resulted from the government's intention to become the "battery of Southeast Asia", as Laos exports an estimated two-thirds of its hydropower. This goal can be attributed to the geographical region of Laos being situated in the lower Mekong Basin (LMB), which includes a 35% of Mekong's total inflows. According to the Strategic Environmental Assessment (SEA) of the MRC, if the proposed dams are built, they will generate 15,000 MW of power, which is projected to fill 8% of the regional demand by 2025. The SEA reports hydropower in Laos can result in a gross income of $3.8 billion per year. With the SEA research, the Lao government's decision to develop hydropower plants is explained by its economic benefit. The Lao Government has ongoing plans for 50+ new hydropower plants for electricity export. Hydropower development may have environmental and social consequences beyond national borders. Non-governmental organizations such as International Rivers has raised concerns over these developments in the Mekong.

Hydropower has brought in foreign exchange reserves to Laos. Thailand has benefited from importing Lao hydropower to develop its poorer areas, especially in Thailand's northeast.

=== Xayaburi Dam ===
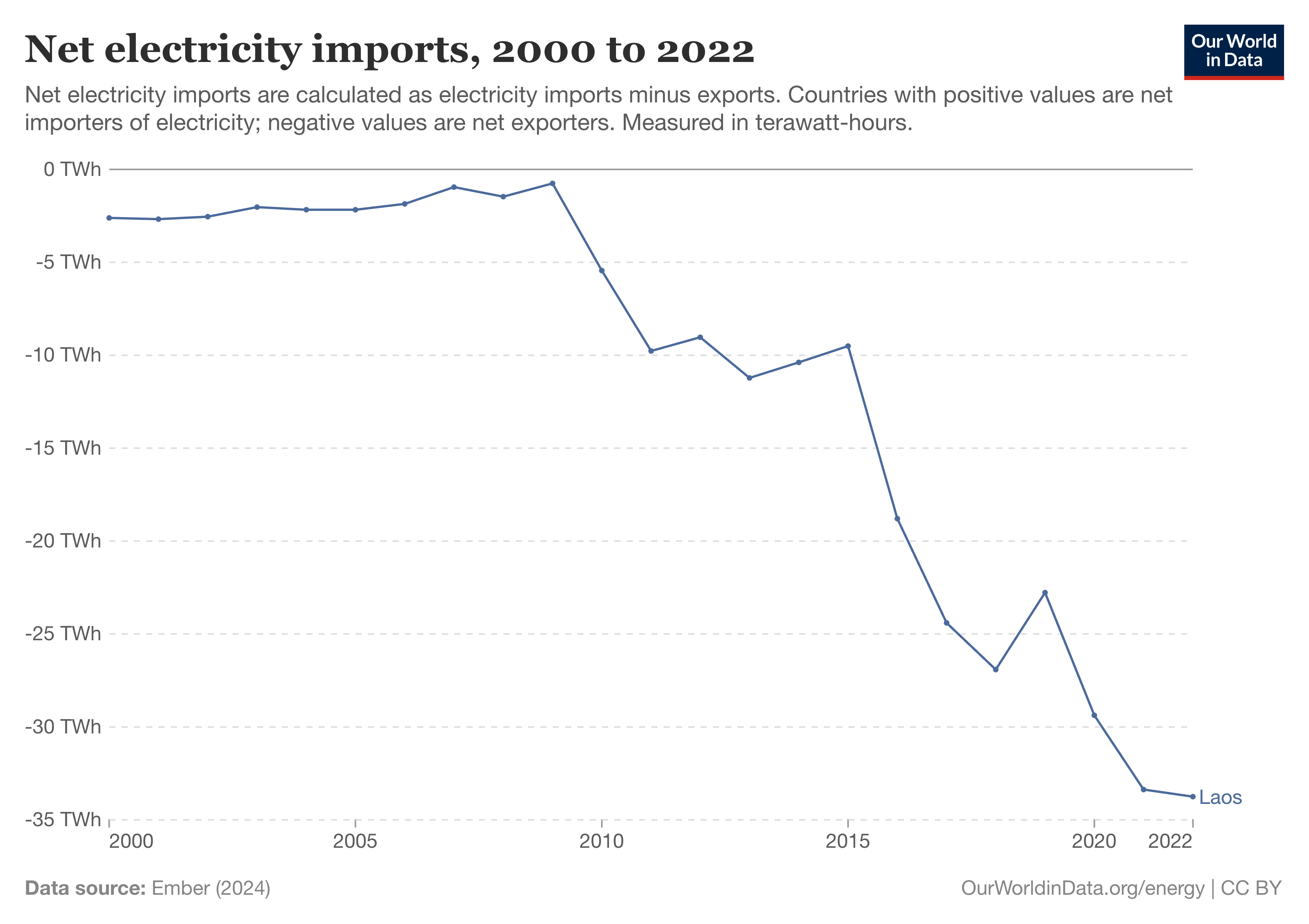
Laos exported 34 terawatt-hours of electricity in 2022

The US$3.8 billion (£2.4bn) proposed hydroelectric Xayaburi Dam has caused tension among Mekong region countries: Laos, Vietnam, Cambodia, and Thailand. In April 2012 a contract was signed for a Thai company, C H Karnchang, to build the dam. The Lao government has pledged to resolve the environmental issues. The government says two big issues—fish migration and sediment flow—will be addressed. Critics say the hydro-electric dam project at Xayaburi would harm the river's ecosystem.

As of 2012, the Mekong River downstream is free of dams. Approximately 60 million people live in the area in Laos, Vietnam, and Cambodia. U.S. Secretary of State Hillary Clinton visiting the ASEAN countries in July 2012, demanded environmental investigations of the project. During her visit, the Lao government made the first official announcement of project cancellation.

== Other renewable energy resources ==
Laos has small-scale hydro and solar energy potential. Laos adopted the Renewable Energy Development Strategy in 2011 and set a target of 30% small-scale renewable energy in the energy production by 2025; to achieve the target Laos could improve renewable energy governance, adopt a feed-in tariff, build a regulatory framework and facilitate market entry for foreign investors.

== Environmental effects of hydropower ==
=== Impacts on the fish life cycle ===
The construction of dams in the Mekong Basin impact fish migration and local fisheries. Generally, the development of a hydropower dam results in altered flow patterns and creates a physical barrier, thus disrupting the fish and their breeding habitats within the river. This is particularly impactful in the Mekong as 40–70% of fish catch is from migrating species, where most hunted fish can potentially fail to reach historic fishing areas with dams impeding upstream migration. Looking at a 2008 study of Hydropower dams in the Lower Mekong Basin, planned dams will have an impact on fisheries and "disrupt upstream migration of economically and biologically important species". The downstream drift of fish eggs that sustain lower fisheries will be blocked by the construction of dams. Trying to apply modern solutions to fish passage can partially mitigate the impact; the scale of fish migration on the Mekong stream involves over 50 species which some methods cannot support. With the addition of more hydropower dams, local fisheries may adapt to different flow conditions and be prepared for unexpected floods with the potential to wash away assets.

=== Impacts to Mekong sediment ===
With Laos planning over 50 dams on the Mekong and its tributaries, the physical barrier of hydropower dams disturbs natural sediment flow downstream. This barrier can cause water levels to rise and creates a trap for sediment behind walls. Investigations note 26,400 tons of nutrient is sent into the Mekong floodplains per year through sediment loads. With dams in place, the floodplains and agricultural lands that are reliant on a certain level of sediment will be deprived. A report by the International Center for Environmental Management suggest, "current nutrient load will be reduced by seventy-five percent by 2030" if all proposed dams are built. A block to nutrient-carrying sediment sets off a chain reaction that will impact all nations downstream, lowering food security and putting millions of livelihoods at risk.

=== Impacts on human development ===
The continual development of Hydropower has effects such as flood control, irrigation, and river navigation. The development of Hydropower plants can affect the 3 million Laotians relying on the Mekong for livelihood and food security. With dams blocking the migration of fish, some communities will experience a loss of fish population. Over some years, the development of hydropower dams have caused a 10–20% population loss while during a period of 2001–2003, the Thai-Lao border showcased a 50% catch decrease, affecting local communities and their livelihood.

The rural communities of a riparian country like Laos rely heavily on fishing for food security. Hydropower development affecting the migration of fish and productivity of fisheries are a great threat to food security. Local communities are not the only ones impacted, a study done by the Mekong River Commission showcased, "Fisheries do not only benefit the people living next to the river or the floodplains, but all of the Lower Mekong Basin countries." Hydropower development indirectly impacts human development on many scales.
