= Lamam =

Lamam may be,

- Lamam language, Vietnam
- Lamam District, Laos
