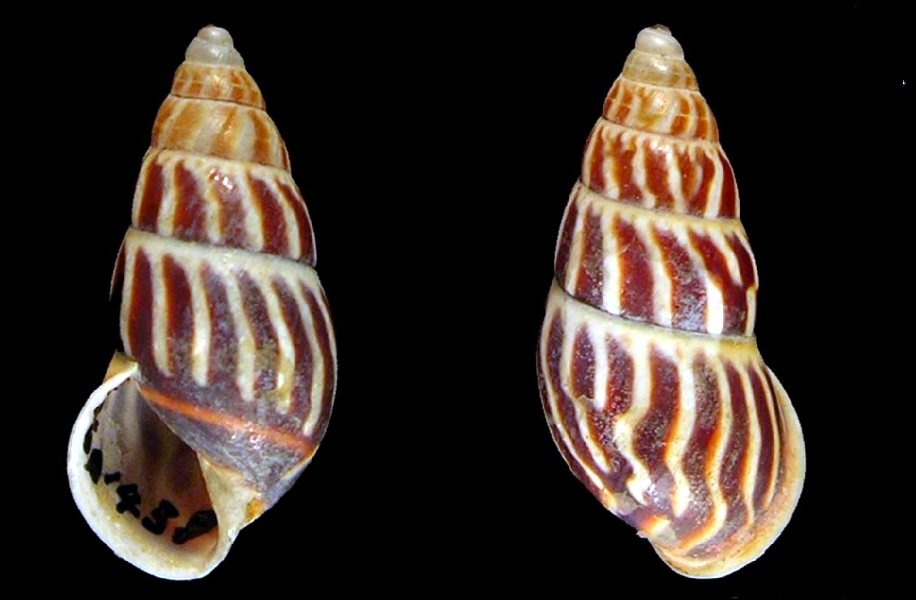
- Shell of Amphidromus zebrinus (lectotype at the Natural History Museum, London)

Scientific classification
- Kingdom: Animalia
- Phylum: Mollusca
- Class: Gastropoda
- Order: Stylommatophora
- Family: Camaenidae
- Genus: Amphidromus
- Species: A. zebrinus

Binomial name
- Amphidromus zebrinus (L. Pfeiffer, 1861)

Synonyms
- Amphidromus (Syndromus) zebrinus (L. Pfeiffer, 1861) · alternative representation; Bulimus zebrinus L. Pfeiffer, 1861 (original combination)

= Amphidromus zebrinus =

Species of tree snail

Amphidromus zebrinus is a species of air-breathing tree snail, an arboreal gastropod mollusk in the family Camaenidae.

Subspecies

- Amphidromus zebrinus fuscolabris Möllendorff, 1898: synonym of Amphidromus cruentatus (Morelet, 1875) (junior subjective synonym)

== Description ==
The length of the shell attains 25 mm, its diameter 10.5 mm.

The shell is sinistral, subperforate, and oblong-conic, appearing rather solid and lightly striate. Its color is white, closely painted with rather wide, nearly straight or somewhat waved black-brown stripes. The spire is slender and conic, with a slightly acute and black vertex; the suture appears shallow and white. Comprising six and a half whorls, the upper ones are convex, while the rest are slightly so, with the body whorl measures two-fifths of the total length and tapers slightly below. The columella appears slightly inflated and rather straightly receding. The aperture is oblique and semi-oval; the peristome is simple and rather broadly expanded, with the columellar margin reflexed and overhanging.

== Distribution ==
This species is endemic to Vietnam
