= Salavan province =

Province of Laos

Salavan province ແຂວງ ສາລະວັນ
- Province
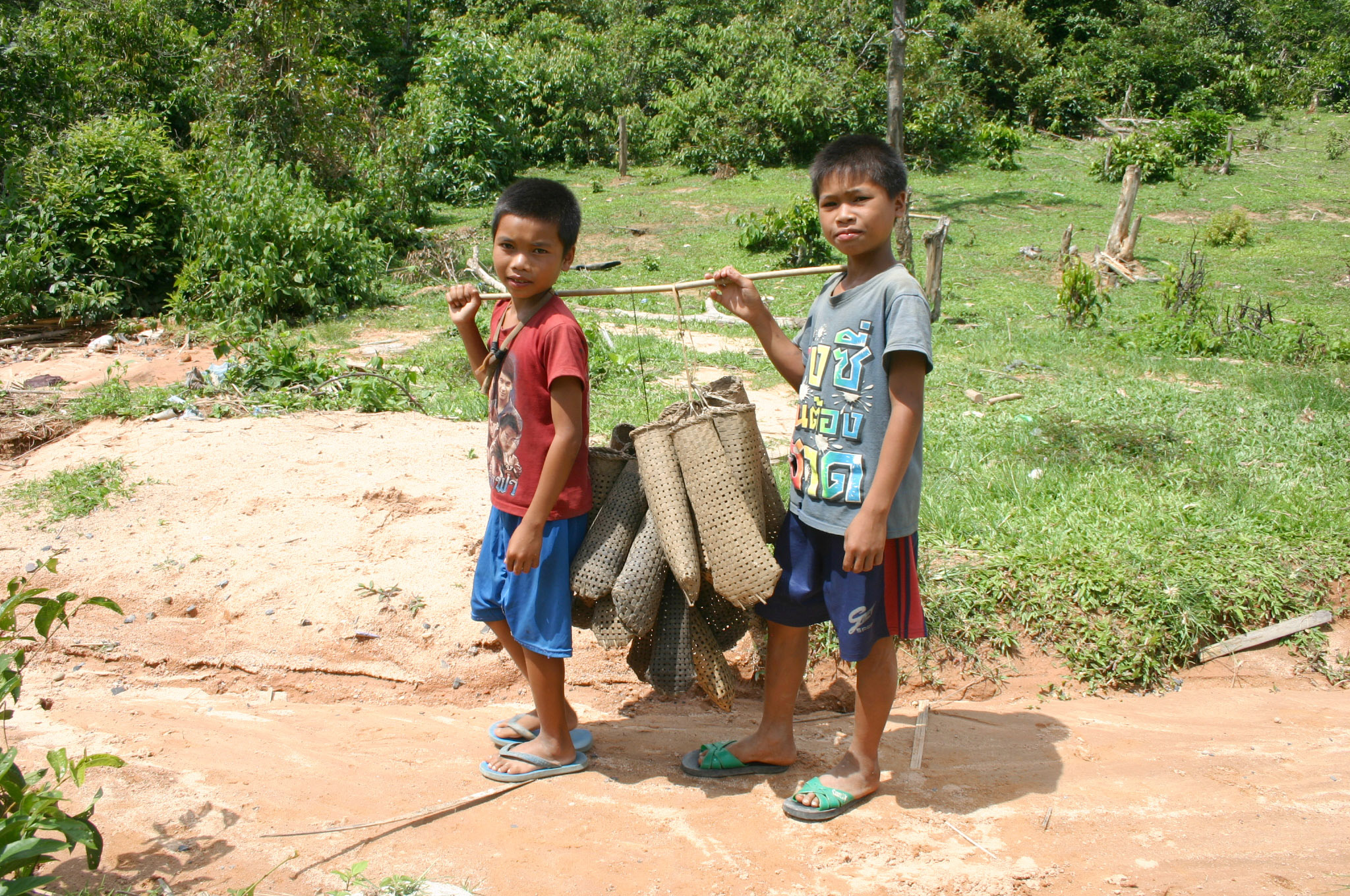

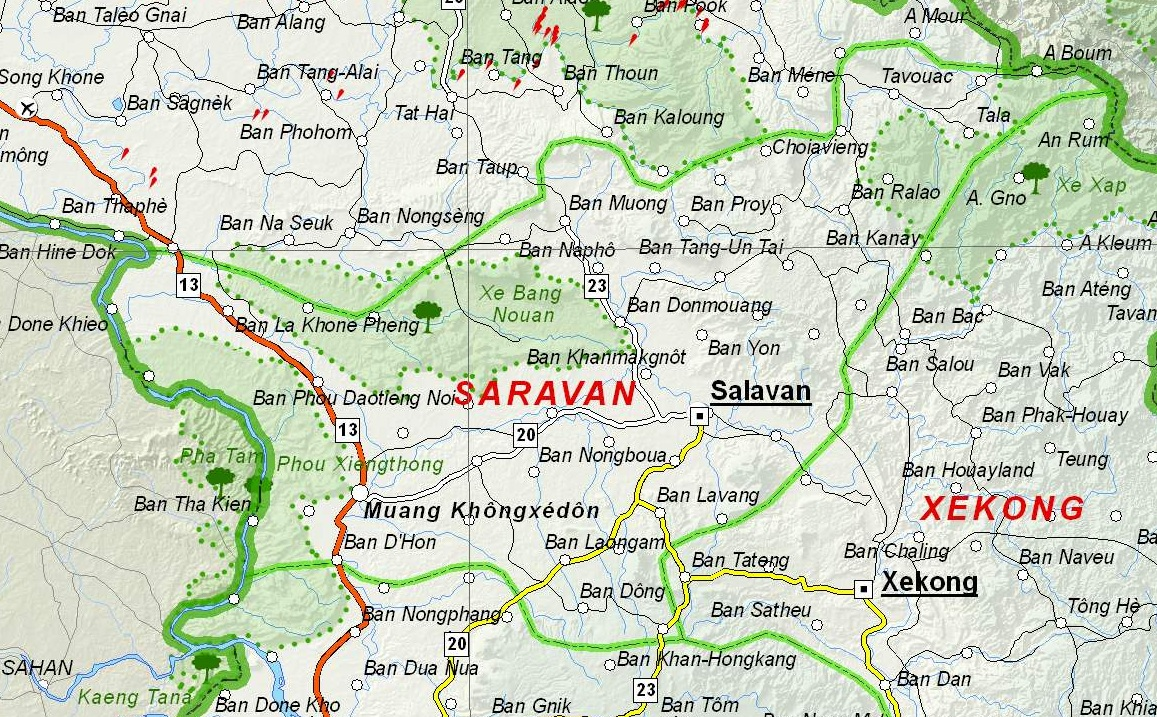
- Map of Salavan province

- Location of Salavan province in Laos
- Coordinates: 15.87°N 106.35°E
- Country: Laos
- Capital: Salavan

Area
  - Total: 10,691 km^{2} (4,128 sq mi)

Population (2020 census)
  - Total: 442,200
  - Density: 41.36/km^{2} (107.1/sq mi)
- Time zone: UTC+07
- ISO 3166 code: LA-SL
- HDI (2022): 0.535 low · 16th

Salavan (also Saravane, Lao: ສາລະວັນ) is a province of Laos, located in the south of the country. Its earlier name was Saravan which was changed by the Thais to Salavan in 1828. It was part of the Champasak Kingdom in an area known as Muang Mang inhabited by minorities of Mon-Khmer groups.

== Geography ==
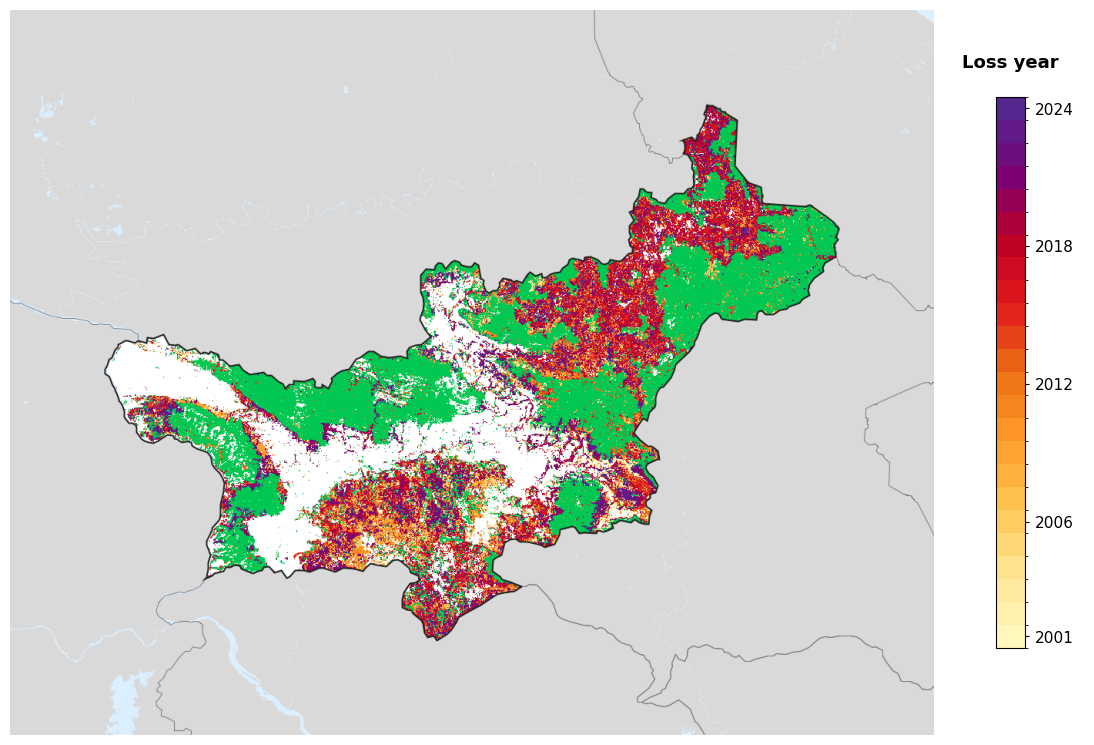
Tree-cover loss year in Salavan, 2001-2024, from the Global Forest Change dataset.

Salavan province covers an area of 16,389 square kilometres (6,328 sq mi). The province borders Savannakhét province to the north, Vietnam to the east, Xekong province to the southeast, Champasak province to the south and Thailand to the west. Settlements in the province include Salavan, Muang Khongxedon, Ban Tha Kien, Ban D'Hon, Ban Phou Daotleng Noi, Ban La Khone Pheng, Ban Laongam, Ban Dong, Ban Lavang, Ban Nongbua, Ban Khanmakgnot, Ban Yon, Man Donmouang, Ban Napho, Ban Proy, Ban Tang-Un Tai, Choiavieng, Ban Ralao, Ban Kanay, Tavouc, Tala and A Boum.

Salavan city is the capital of the province is located on a bend of Se Don River, which flows through the province and eventually joins the Mekong River at Pakse river. The city serves as a nerve center for supply of goods to the hinterland districts of the province. The city is the administrative, economic and cultural hub of the province. Subsequent to the damage caused to the town during the 1971 Indochina war, it has been rebuilt as per urban planning concepts. 2 French colonial buildings are seen here.

Nang Bua Lake, from where the Se Bon River originates, is 15 kilometres (9.3 mi) from the city. The lake has Siamese crocodiles. Nearby is a hill, Phu Katae at 1,588 metres (5,210 ft) where the CIA airstrip was once functional.

Its origin is volcanic with mountains and valleys. The central part of the province is located on the Bolaven Plateau, which is an agricultural area with Arabica coffee as the dominant cash crop and other horticultural products which are exported. The western part of Salavan province is delimited by the Mekong river while the eastern part is delimited by the Lao-Vietnamese border. In addition to the Bolaven Plateau and the Mekong, the topography includes plains and a mountainous region near the border with Vietnam. The 2 protected areas in the province are the Xe Pian and Dong Ampham.

=== Protected areas ===
The Xe Sap Important Bird Area (IBA) is situated within the Xe Xap National Biodiversity Conservation Area (NBCA) (113,000 ha), surpassing its boundaries. The IBA is part of 2 provinces, Salavan and Sekong. It is 137,120 ha in size, and sits at an altitude of 400–2,100 metres (1,300–6,900 ft). The habitat includes dry evergreen forest, pine forest, semi-evergreen forest, upper montane forest, and grassland. 2 species of gymnosperm were noted: Fokienia hodginsii and Pinus dalatensis. Its avifauna includes Blyth's kingfisher (Alcedo hercules), yellow-billed nuthatch (Sitta solangiae), and Vietnamese crested argus (Rheinardia ocellata). There are types of mammals, 2 types of primates, and 1 turtle species.

The "Mekong Channel from Phou Xiang Thong to Siphandon" IBA is 34,200 ha in size. There is a 10,000 ha overlap with the Phou Xiengthong National Biodiversity Conservation Area (NBCA is 120,000 ha in size). The IBA encompasses 2 provinces, Salavan and Champasak. The IBA's altitude is 40–50 metres (130–160 ft) above sea level. Its topography is characterized by earth banks, rocky banks, rocky islands, seasonally flooded sandbars, low vegetated islands, rocky islets, sandy beaches, and sand bars. Avifauna is the last known nesting little terns (Sternula albifrons); there are small pratincoles (Glareola lactea), river lapwings (Vanellus duvaucelii), wire-tailed swallows (Hirundo smithii), and river terns (Sterna aurantia).

The Phou Xiang Thong IBA (36,650 hectare) is situated within the Phou Xiengthong NBCA (120,000 hectare). The IBA encompasses 2 provinces, Salavan and Champasak. The IBA is located at an altitude of 40–500 metres (130–1,640 ft) above sea level. Its topography is characterized by low hills, lowlands, rivers, and seasonal streams. Its habitat contains dry deciduous tropical forest, moist deciduous tropical forest, semi-evergreen tropical rain forest, mixed deciduous forest, dry dipterocarp forest, and open rocky savanna. Avifauna include Siamese fireback (Lophura diardi), red-collared woodpecker (Picus rabieri), green peafowl (Pavo muticus), and grey-faced tit babbler (Macronous kelleyi).

Xe Bang Nouan (XBN) Protected Area was established on 29 October 1993 covering an area of 1260 km^{2}, and extending over Salavan and Savannakhet provinces. The topography of the reserve lies in the elevation range of 200-1000m; has flat to gently rolling terrain below 400 m elevation in the north and south of the Bang Nouan River; the central part the river flows through gorges; and to the east of the hills is the valley of the river. The forests found are the evergreen, dry dipterocarp, mixed deciduous and other natural forest types, and about 87% of the area of the reserve is forested. Forest products of damar, fish and sticklac are exploited by the ethnic population living in the reserve for economic sustenance; they have livestock and shifting cultivation practices.

=== Administrative divisions ===
The province is made up of the following 8 districts:

Map	Code	Name	Lao script
	14-01	Salavan District	ເມືອງສາລາວັນ
	14-02	Ta Oy District	ຕາໂອ້ຍ
	14-03	Toumlane District	ຕຸ້ມລານ
	14-04	Lakhonepheng District	ລະຄອນເພັງ
	14-05	Vapy District	ວາປີ
	14-06	Khongsedone District	ຄົງເຊໂດນ
	14-07	Lao Ngarm District	ເລົ່າງາມ
	14-08	Sa Mouay District	ສະມ້ວຍ

== History ==
Approximately 1,500 years ago, Khmer people established settlements in what later is Salavan province. It came to be ruled by the Champa after the Cham people migrated to the territory. Kingdoms united into the Lan Xang under Fa Ngum in 1353. Between 1779 and 1893, the province was a Thai colony. In the 20th century, it became a French Protectorate under the Franco-Siamese Treaty of October 3, 1893. The province had 8 districts and 715 villages after the liberation of 1975.

In the Indochina war, Salavan town was subject to depredation when its control shifted between the Royal Forces and the Pathet Lao. It was subsequently rebuilt with brick masonry and timber buildings, coexisting with buildings which survived the war.

== Demographics ==
The population of the province as per the 2015 census was 396,942. The ethnic groups in the province comprise the Tahoy, Pako, Katang, Kado, Suay, and Laven.

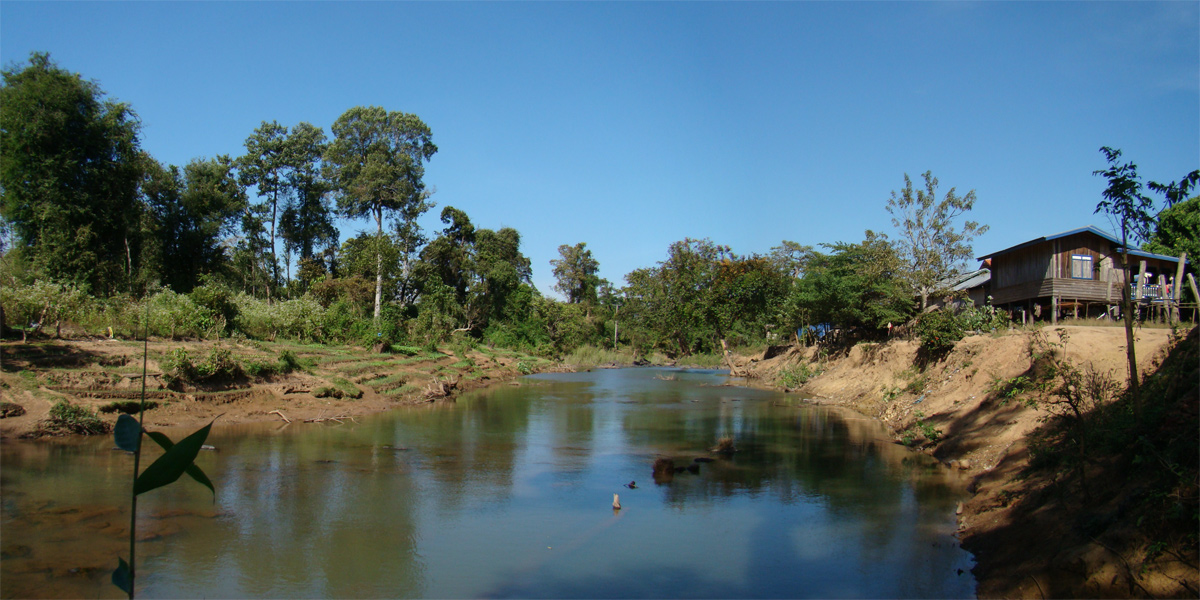
Ban Huay Lanong, a Tahoy village

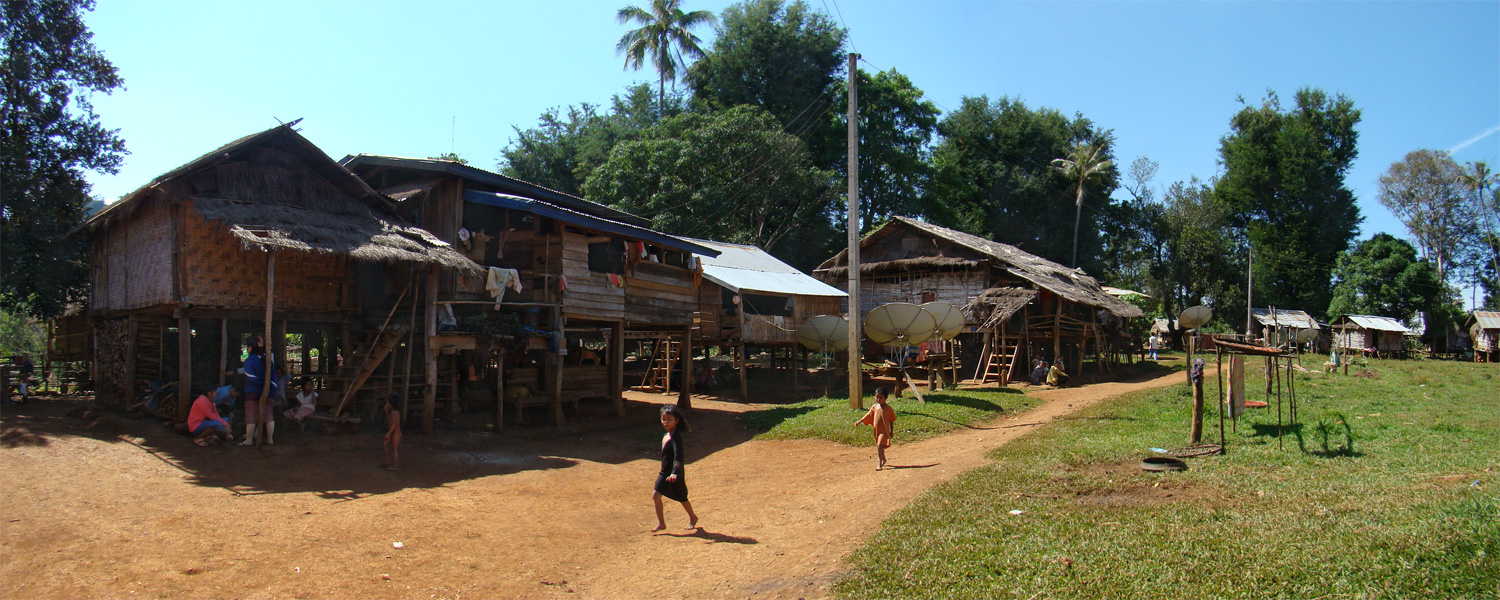
Ban Khiang Tadsoung, an Alak village

== Economy ==
Salavan province is “one of the most important coffee producing areas of Laos” along with Champasak province and Sekong province. Arabica coffee and coffee beans are the products of the Bolaven Plateau which is an export revenue product and can be bought in villages along the roads.

== Landmarks ==
Katang village in Toomlarn District is known for silk weaving. Here the Lapup Festival is held in February, when buffaloes are sacrificed. Hence, the festival is called the Katu and Alak Buffalo Sacrifice. The village is located on the Ho Chi Minh Trail where UXOs are found. People collect the war relics and sell them.

Tahoy town is where the Tahoy ethnic groups reside; there are about 30,000 of them. Their cultural practice involves shamanistic rituals combined with animism. During the festivals, people of the town erect totems made in the form of a diamond as a warning to outsiders not to enter the town. Tigers are a sight in this town which keeps the people indoors during the night.

Tatlo on the Bolaven Plain is known for Katu and Alak villages, and a waterfall.

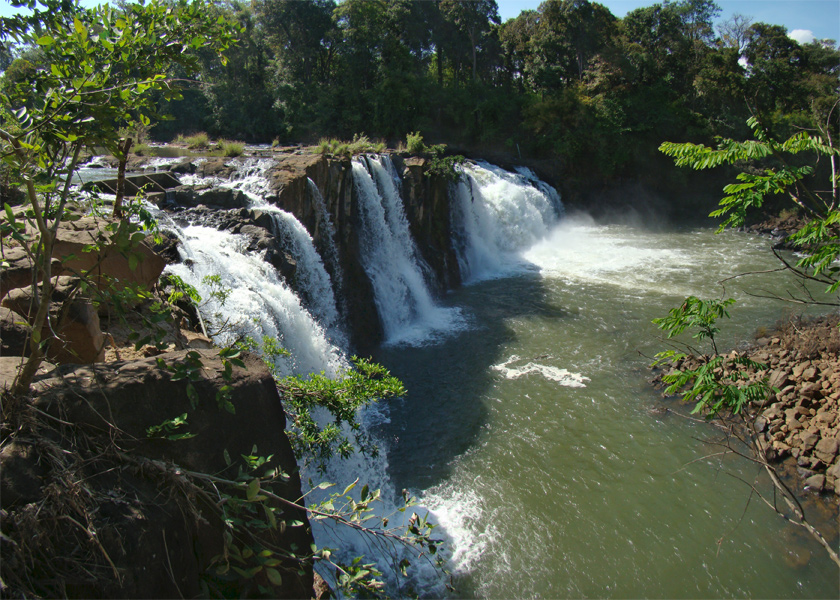
Tatlo Waterfalls

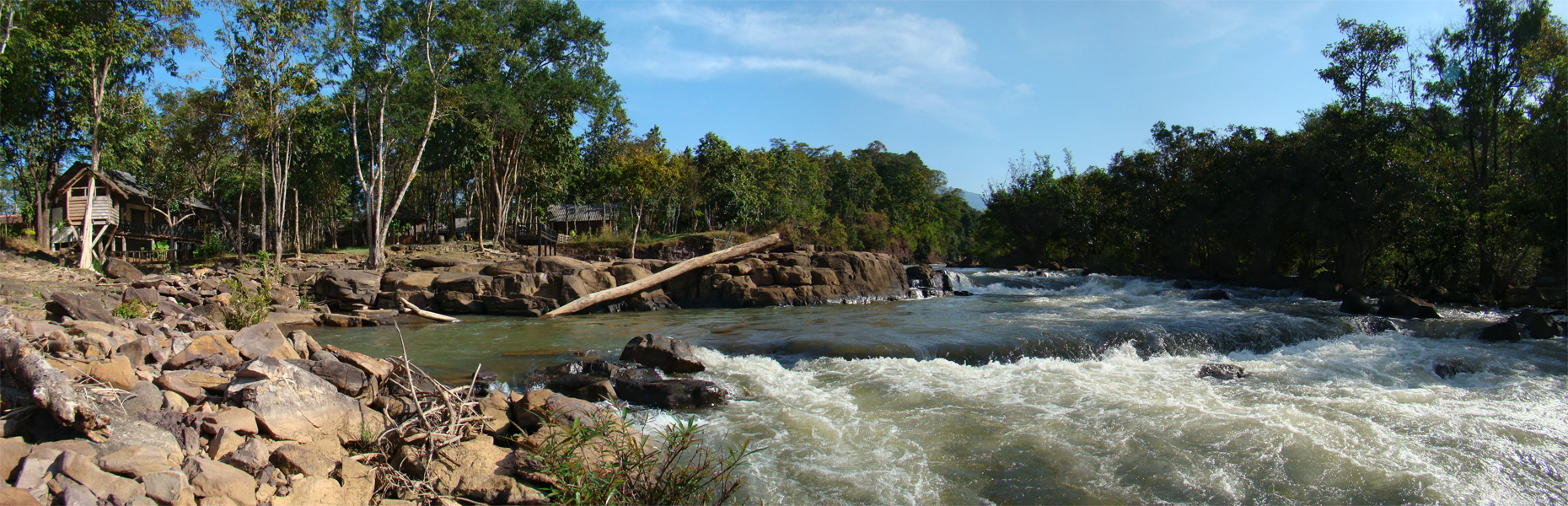
Downstream of Tatlo Waterfalls

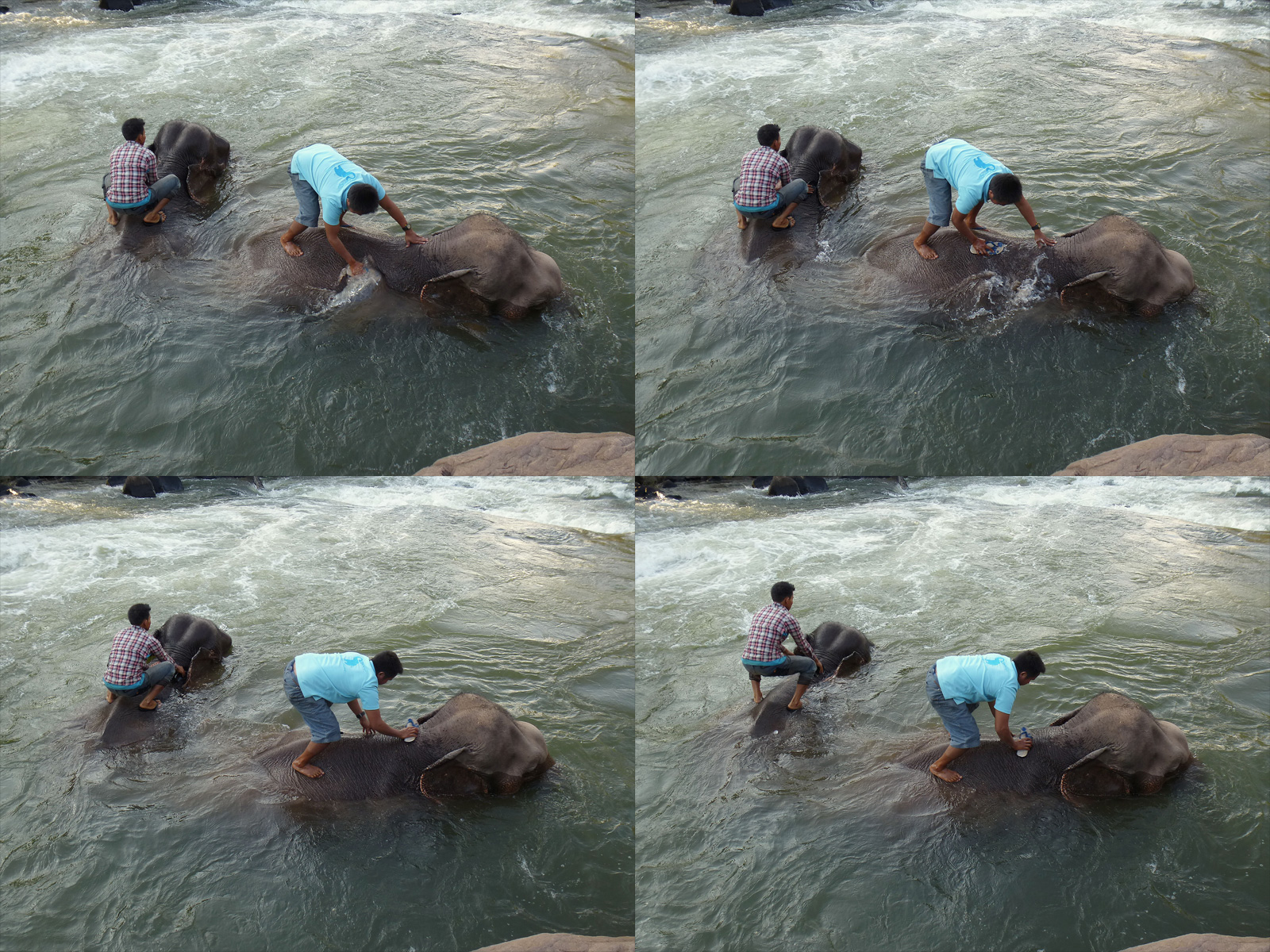
Elephant bath in the Tatlo River

== Culture ==
Lam Salavane is a Lao language folksong derived from Mon–Khmer styles, accompanied by drums, fiddles, flutes, khenes, lutes, and other percussive instruments.
