= Electrical Construction and Installation, State Enterprise =

Company of Laos

Electrical Construction and Installation, State Enterprise (ECI) is a state company of Laos that is involved with the construction of the country's energy infrastructure. The company is part of the Ministry of Mines and Energy. It was formed as a branch of Electricite du Laos (EDL) in 1982, working on the Vientiane Plain Rural Electrification Project. The company was split from Electricite du Laos in 1989 and continued work on the Southern Provincial Electrification Project, rejoining EDL in 1996 and re-splitting from it in 2006.

ECI has a headquarters building in Vientiane.

== See also ==
- Energy in Laos
- Government of Laos
