= A Magne =

- Location in Laos
- Coordinates: 16°28′N 106°50′E
- Country: Laos
- Province: Saravane Province
- District: Sa Mouay District

A Magne is a village in south-eastern Laos near the border with Vietnam. It is located in Sa Mouay District in Saravane Province.

== History ==
The town was founded following Pakse as French colonists made their way to establish rule in southern Laos. It eventually became a small trading post under the French and French architecture is evident in city planning with tree-lined roads. After Laos gained its independence, the town served as a border town with South Vietnam. The Vietnam War brought few clashes in the region and the town lost much of its significance. After the communist takeover, the town fell into despair until aid in the 1980s. Today, it continues to serve as a border town with Vietnam.
