= Sekong province =

Province of Laos

Sekong province ແຂວງ ເຊກອງ
- Province
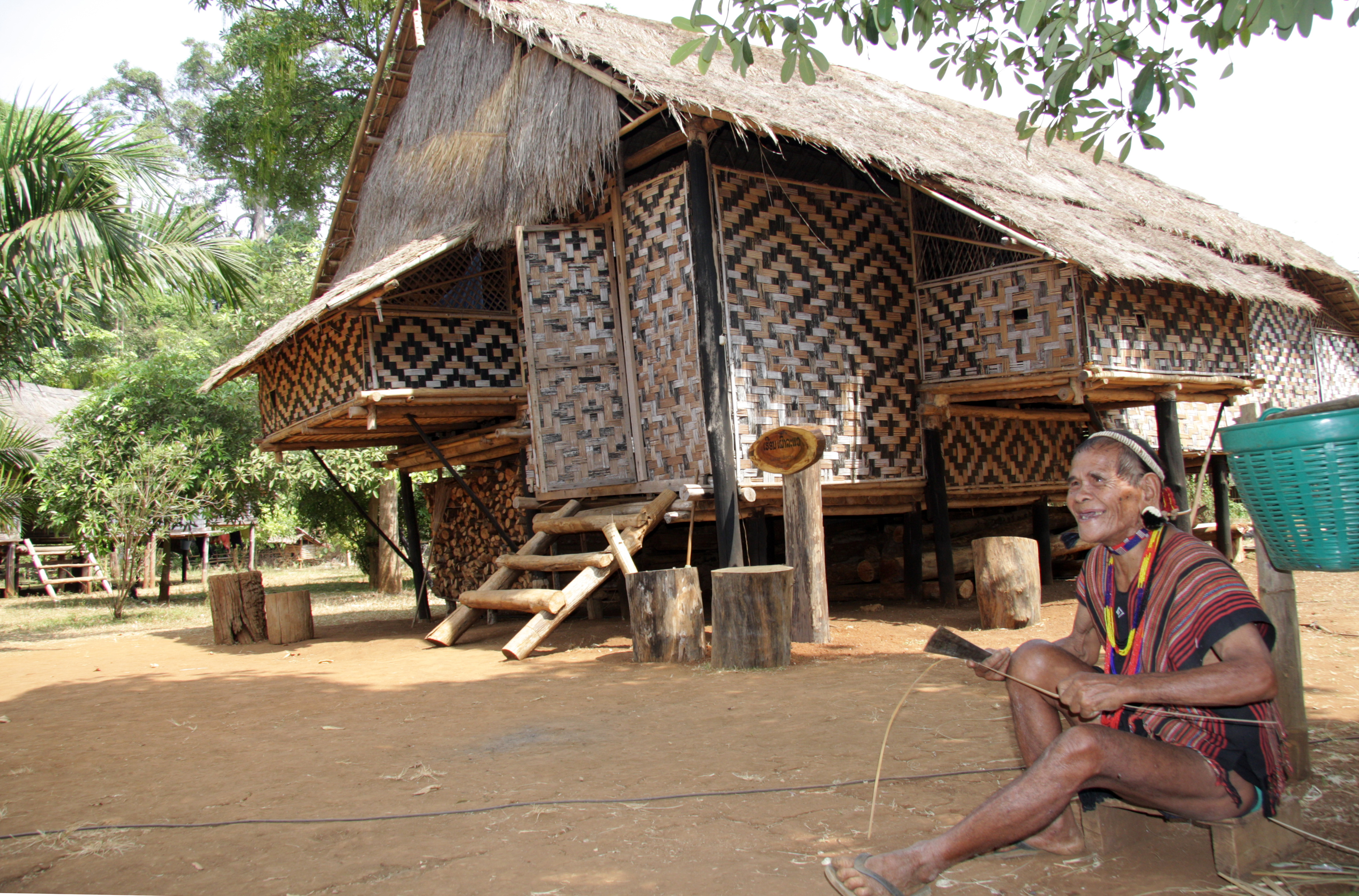

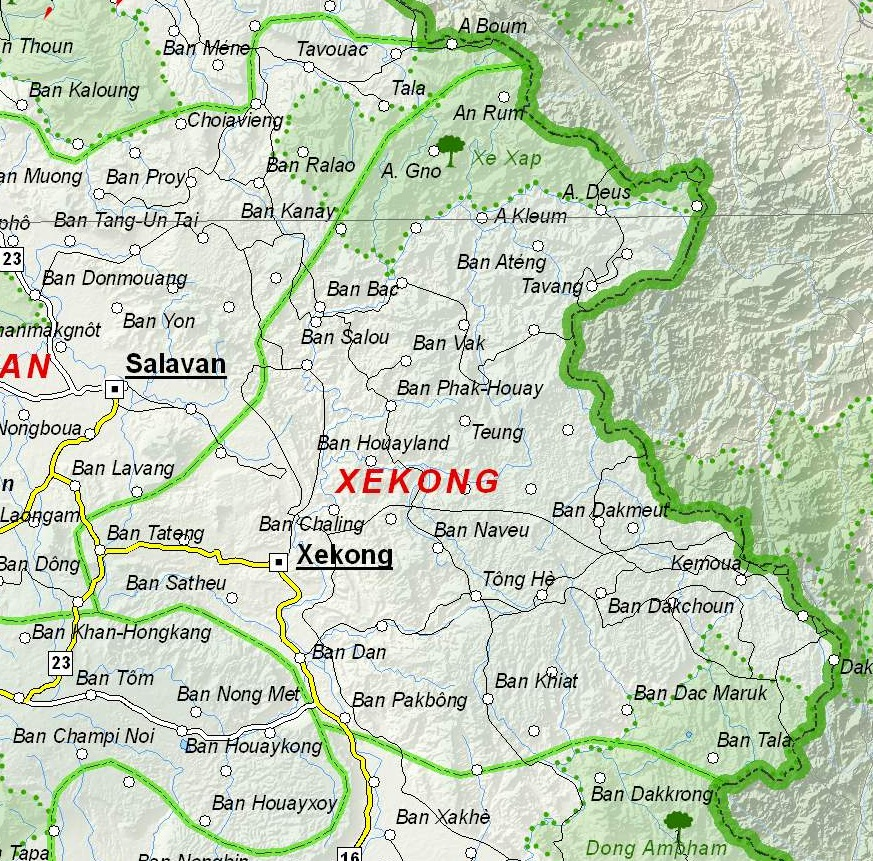
- Map of Sekong province

- Location of Sekong province in Laos
- Coordinates: 15.7166°N 106.65°E
- Country: Laos
- Capital: Sekong

Area
  - Total: 7,665 km^{2} (2,959 sq mi)

Population (2020 census)
  - Total: 129,398
  - Density: 16.88/km^{2} (43.72/sq mi)
- Time zone: UTC+7 (ICT)
- ISO 3166 code: LA-XE
- HDI (2022): ▲0.591 medium · 11th

Sekong (also sometimes Xekong, Lao: ເຊກອງ, pronounced [séː kɔ̀ːŋ]) is a province of Laos in the southeast of the country. It is the second smallest province in Laos, covering an area of 7,665 square kilometres (2,959 sq mi). It is bordered by Vietnam to the east, Attapeu province to the south, Salavan province to the north, and Champasak province to the west. Sekong has the smallest population (129,398 as of 2020) and the lowest population density of any province. It was created in 1984 by splitting Salavan province. It is the most diverse province in Laos with 14 ethnic groups. The Sekong River, which divides the province, flows in a southerly direction into Cambodia and is navigable. The Dakchung Plateau and Xe Xap National Biodiversity Conservation Area are among the areas under protection.

== History ==
Sekong province was created in 1984, when it was split off from Salavan province and Attapeu province. Sekong has 14 ethnic groups reported from a population of 85,000. Since most of these ethnic groups are not Buddhist fewer wats are seen in the province as their belief system is more of animism and ancestral worship. During the communist regime, the province was created to give benefits to the local ethnic groups. This advantage seems to be on the decline with ethnic Lao groups dominating the political scene and in the local administration.

== Geography ==
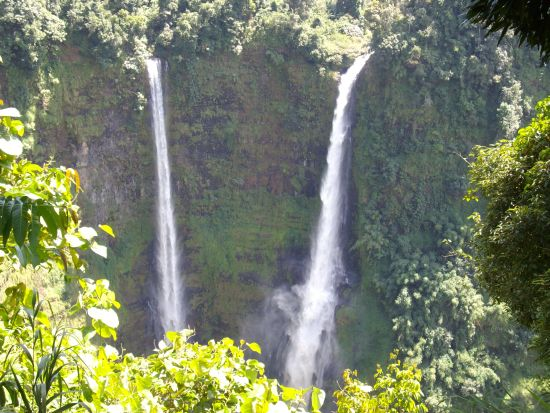
Tad Fane Waterfall in the Bolaven Plateau

Sekong province, 1 of the provinces in Laos, is the second smallest province, covering an area of 7,665 square kilometres (2,959 sq mi). It is bordered by Vietnam to the east, Attapeu province to the south, Salavan province to the north, and Champasak province to the west. Sekong has the lowest population (about 83,000) and the lowest population density of any province. Sekong is split administratively into 4 districts: Thateng on the Bolaven Plateau, Lamam in the lowland plain, and Dakchung and Kaleum in the mountainous areas bordering Vietnam. The Tad Xe Noi waterfall is located 25 kilometres (16 mi) south of Sekong city.

The Sekong River, which divides the province, flows in a southern direction into Cambodia and is navigable for boats. Long-tail boats are navigated through the river along routes on the edge of the Bolaven Plateau. Freshwater dolphins can be seen in the river. Waterfalls are a feature in the river valley; some of the falls are the Tad Hia, Tad Faek, Tad Se Noi (or Tad Hua Khon), and Nam Tok Katamtok that is located on the Huay Katam River, in the forests of the Bolaven Plateau. The Sekong river valley has plains interspersed with paddy fields and fruit orchards. Its tropical forest has species of flora and fauna.

Sekong is “among the most remote areas of Laos”; some of its villages are virtually inaccessible by road for at least half of the year.

== Environment ==
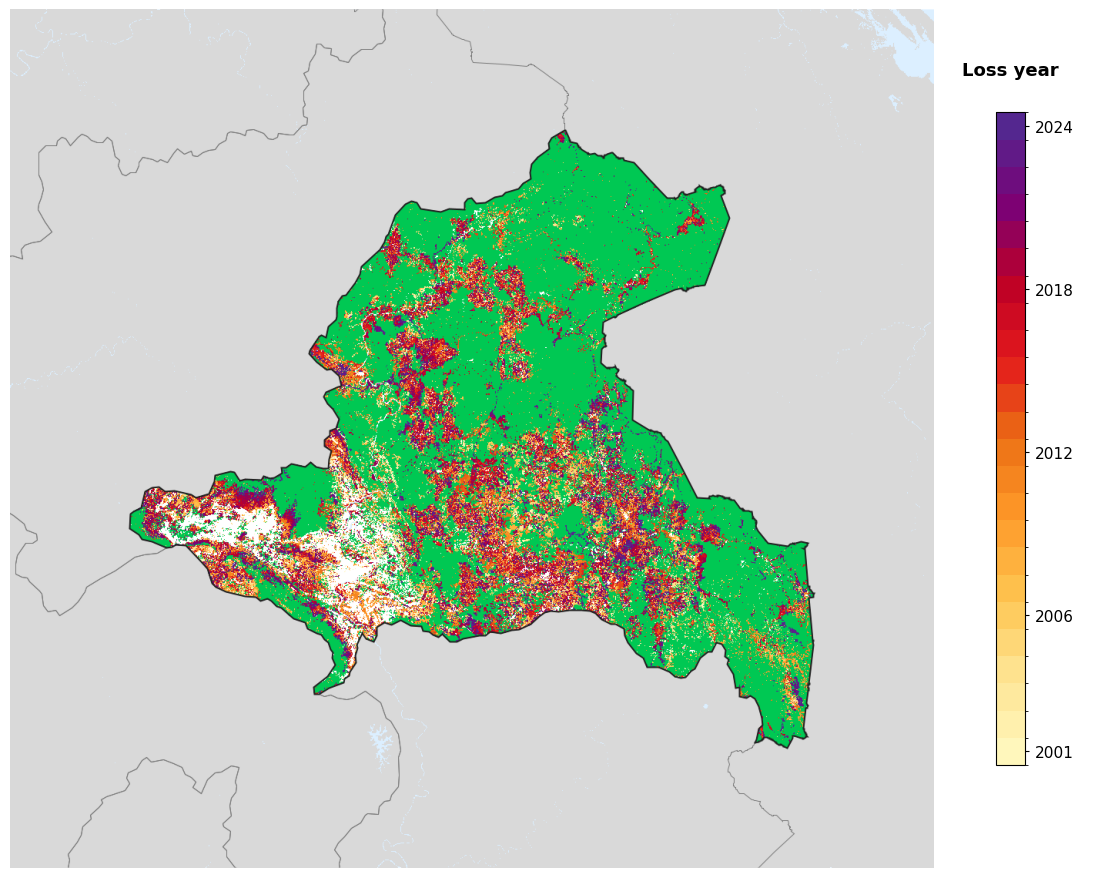
Tree-cover loss year in Sekong, 2001-2024, from the Global Forest Change dataset.

Government figures classify over 50% of the province's land area as forest, the majority of it mixed deciduous and semi-evergreen forest, and with pockets of dry dipterocarp forest along the Sekong River valley, and pine forest in the Dakchung highlands. Most of the natural forest in Sekong has never been commercially logged. Commercial timber extraction has been expanding. There is growing pressure on Sekong to log its forests – from Vietnamese interests (where the wood furniture sector averaged 70% growth per year during 2000–2004) and from Lao companies (who face wood shortages because of dwindling stocks in lowland forests). The economic return from the forest resources of the province, as of 2003, was estimated to be in the range of US$398–$525 per household, more than agricultural income. The revenue to the state from sale of timber was estimated to be US$10.35 per hectare. The natural forests in the province are helpful in carbon sequestration benefits estimated to be US$124 per hectare and in watershed improvements, by way of avoiding erosion and reducing flood incidence. Corruption in Sekong province has reportedly "undermined a successful donor-funded village participatory sustainable forest management initiative."

=== Protected areas ===
The Dakchung Plateau is an Important Bird Area (IBA). It is 5,140 ha in size, and at an elevation of 800–1,400 metres (2,600–4,600 ft). The habitat is characterized as pine woodland, grassland, degraded semi-evergreen forest, dry evergreen forest, marshy land, and tall grasses areas. Of the avifauna, the yellow-billed nuthatch (Sitta solangiae) is classified as near threatened, while the black-crowned barwing (Actinodura sodangorum) is classified as vulnerable. Other fauna include the Oriental small-clawed otter (Aonyx cinerea), tiger (Panthera tigris), big-headed turtle (Platysternon megacephalum), and herds of Asian elephant (Elephas maximus).

The Xe Sap IBA is in the Xe Xap National Biodiversity Conservation Area (NBCA); the IBA surpasses the NBCA's 1335 km^{2} boundaries (established in February 1996). The IBA and NBCA are part of 2 provinces, Sekong and Salavan. The NBCA sits at an altitude of 400–2,066 metres (1,312–6,778 ft) and is 1335 km^{2} in size; the highest peak is Dong Be with an elevation of 2,066 m, part of the Southern Annamite Mountains. The habitat is characterized by forests (dry evergreen, pine, semi-evergreen, and upper montane), and grassland. 2 species of gymnosperm were recorded. Its key avifauna includes Blyth's kingfisher (Alcedo hercules), Vietnamese crested argus (Rheinardia ocellata), and yellow-billed nuthatch. Other wildlife are 2 types of primates and 1 turtle species. An unpaved road from Salavan to Ta-Oy and further east to Samuoy runs the northern border of Xe Sap NBCA. Paths provide approaches from the main road to villages located on the northern part of the NBCA. The Kong River (or Xe Kong, or Sekong) and its 2 tributaries Xe Sap and Xe Lon provide access to the reserve by boats. The reserve has water falls, rocky cliffs and rhododendrons at higher elevations. There are 43 mammals (including 18 key species), 178 birds (18 are key species), 48 reptiles and 33 amphibians; some species of wildlife are 2 species of bears, serow, large antlered muntjac, a number of gaurs and tigers. A particular plant species are Pinus dalatensis and Kinabaluchloa species, a genus of bamboo.

The Phou Ahyon IBA is 148,900 hectares in size. The IBA's elevation varies between 400–2,193 metres (1,312–7,195 ft) above sea level. The topography contains the Phou Ahyon massif (2,193 metres (7,195 ft)), which is the highest and largest massif in the country's southern area. The habitat is characterized by dry evergreen forest, Fokienia forest, and upper montane forest. Avifauna includes black-crowned barwing, black-hooded laughingthrush (Garrulax milleti), chestnut-eared laughingthrush (G. konkakinhensis), Vietnamese crested argus, golden-winged laughingthrush (G. ngoclinhensis), and yellow-billed nuthatch.

== Administrative divisions ==
The second smallest province in Laos is made up of the following districts:

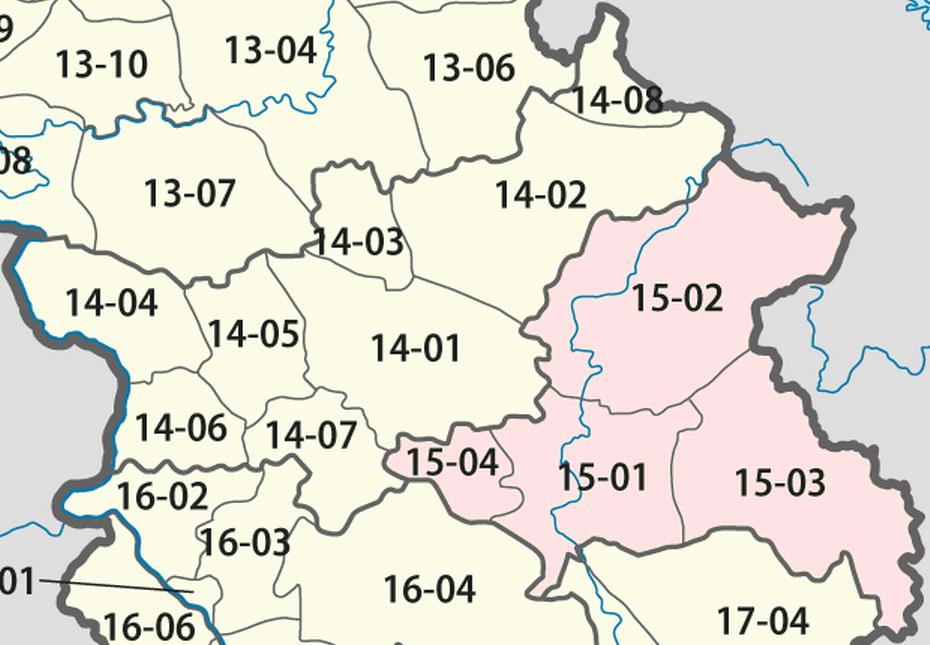
Map

Map	Code	Name	Lao script
	15-01	La Mam District	ລະມາມ
	15-02	Kaleum District	ກະເລິມ
	15-03	Dak Cheung District	ດັກເຈິງ
	15-04	Tha Teng District	ທ່າແຕງ

== Demographics ==
About 3% of the population are ethnic Lao. The majority (97%) come from 1 of at least 14 ethnic minority groups. The Alak (21% of the provincial population), Katu (20%), Tarieng (19%) and Nge/Krieng (11%) are the most populous ethnic groups. The Lao government classifies these groups as “Lao Theung” (midland Lao), and an ethno-linguistic categorization, based on language families, places them under the Austroasiatic family. Within this family, the ethnic groups of Sekong fall into 2 linguistic branches: the Katuic (including the Katu and the Nge/Krieng) and the Bahnaric (Alak and Tarieng). Approximately 14,700 Katu live in the province.

== Economy ==
Sekong province is “one of the most important coffee-producing areas of Laos” along with Salavan province and Champasak province. Sekong province is Laos' main honey-producing area. Purpose-made tree cavities are a particular tree beekeeping methods practiced in 3 districts: Dakchung, Kalum, and Lama.

In June 2020, the Lao government approved a Singapore energy firm's plan to develop a US$1.7 billion fossil fuel-fired thermal power plant in Sekong province. The plant will produce 1,000 megawatts (MW) of power. The plant will reportedly run on "domestically-extracted fuel sources, adding value to local natural resources." Laos has an estimated 600-700 million tons of coal reserves nation-wide, primarily lignite.

In February 2021, the Lao government announced that 2 lignite-fired power plants will constructed in Sekong province. Work is to begin in 2021 and be completed by 2025. The electricity generated will be sold to Cambodia for 7.2 US cents per kWh. The first plant will be built by Phonesack Group in Kaleum District. It will have an installed capacity of 1,800MW. The company will invest between US$3–4 billion, including the construction of transmission lines to export electricity to Cambodia. The second coal-fired, 700 MW plant will be built in La Mam District by a Chinese company that will invest over US$1 billion in the project. The government claims that coal reserves adjacent to the plants are sufficient to power the plants for the entire 25-year concession period.

== Culture ==
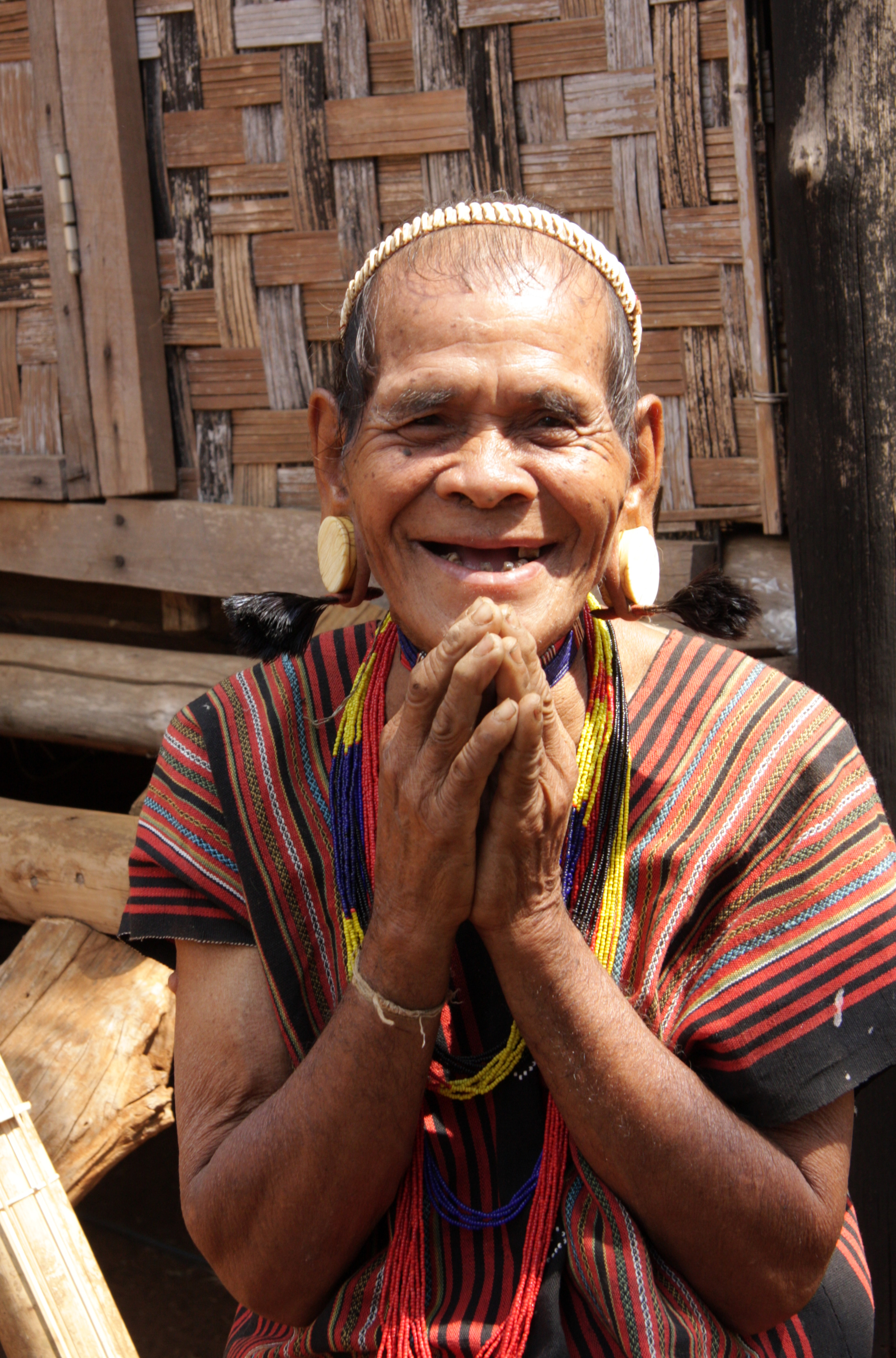
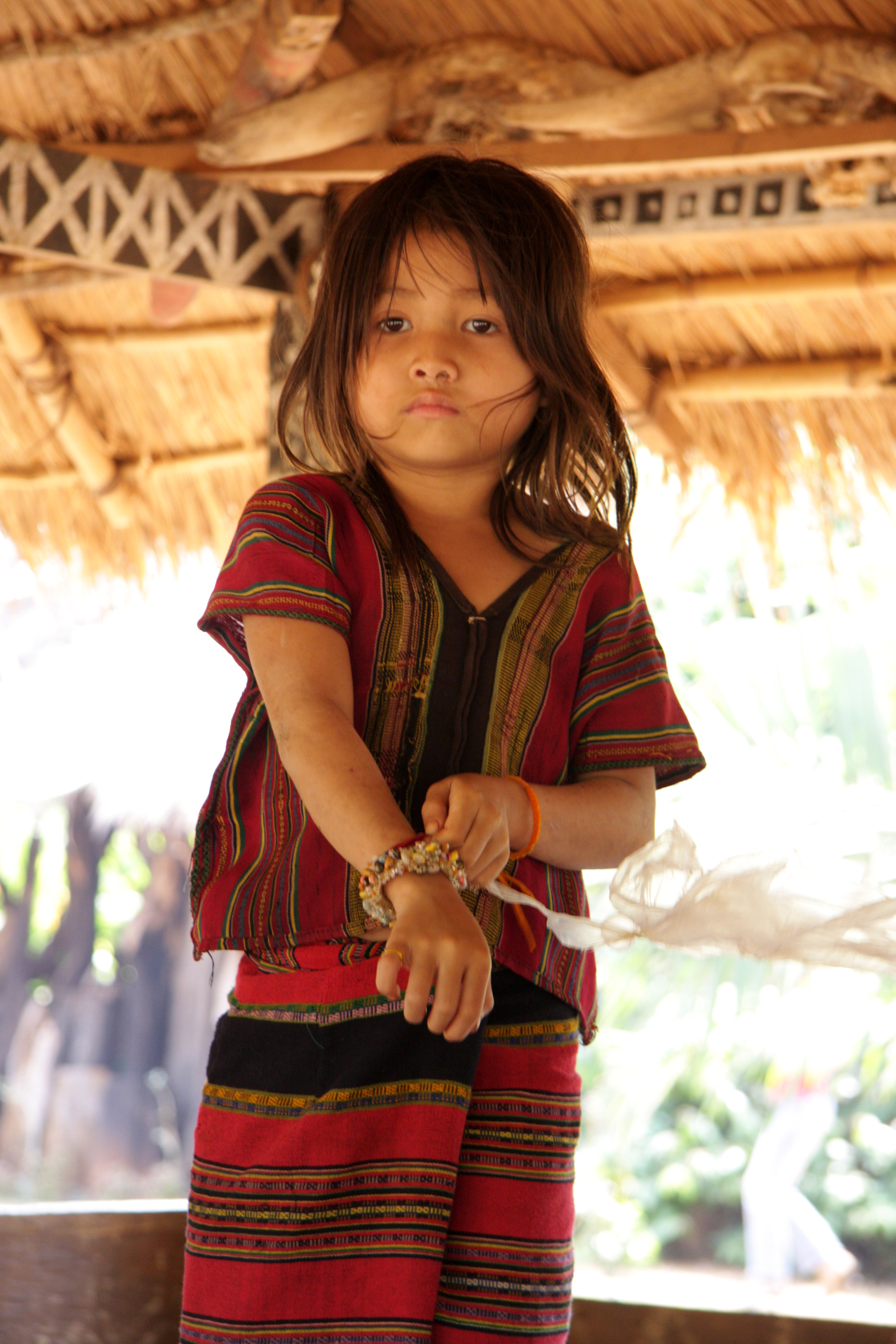
Bru and Katu locals of Sekong province wearing striped clothing

Cultural features in the province relate to the indigenous ethnic cultures with spiritual links to the land, including 5 "Lao Theung" languages with 1 becoming extinct. There are funerary and sacred forests, Indochina War relics, and a stretch of the Ho Chi Minh Trail. To ward off falling bombs during the Indochina War, some animist tribal people placed a talisman above their huts.

Weaving activity in Sekong City has textile designs featuring multicolored lines and is aided by a back-tensioned loom called the "hip loom". Katu women apply a warping technique to their weaving. In addition to the Katu, the Talieng (Tarieng) of Sekong City use back-tensioned looms, as do the Harlak in Kasangkang village, which is located outside Sekong City. The men of the Talieng ethnic group wrap a Tha Khatil cloth around their waist as a traditional costume. Among the Mon-Khmer, stripped lines are incorporated into clothing by use of the back strap loom. In addition to geometric stripes, decorative patterns include animals or plants, considered to be traditional motifs, or planes and bombs, which have a historical context. Traditional skirts (sin) are a specialty of the Alak group. Of note are Pha Biang (scarves) and Pha Kaan (head cloth scarves), including turbans, bonnets, hats and diadems.

Woodcarvings and traditional longhouses are features in some villages, with visitor attractions at Kandone Village.
