= Sa Mouay district =

Sa Mouay district ເມືອງສະມ້ວຍ
- District
- Coordinates: 16°25′N 106°49′E
- Country: Laos
- Province: Salavan
- Time zone: UTC+7 (ICT)

Sa Mouay is a district (muang) of Saravane province in southern Laos.

== Settlements ==
- A Magne
