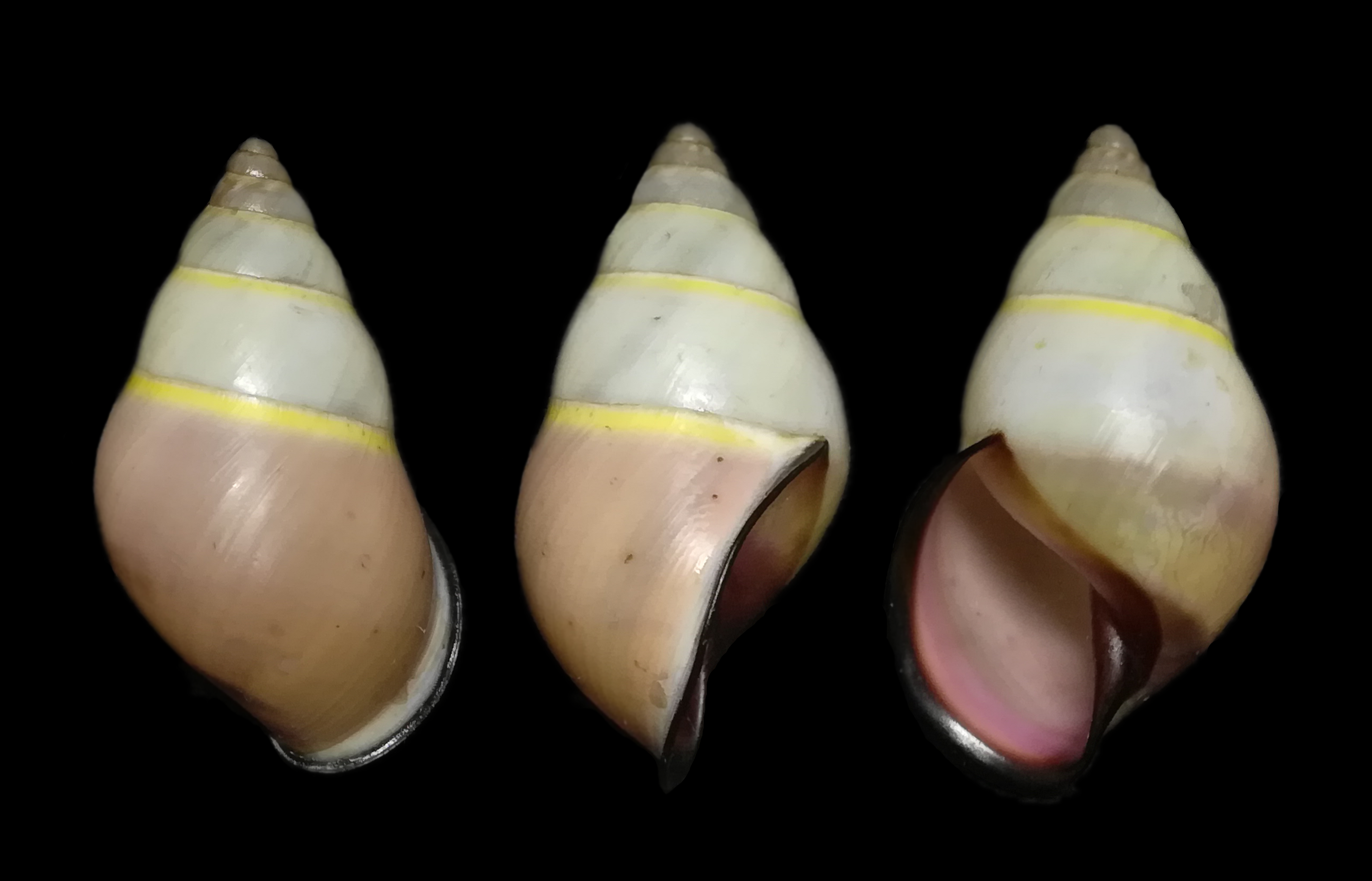

Scientific classification
- Kingdom: Animalia
- Phylum: Mollusca
- Class: Gastropoda
- Order: Stylommatophora
- Family: Camaenidae
- Genus: Amphidromus
- Species: A. cruentatus

Binomial name
- Amphidromus cruentatus (Morelet, 1875)

Synonyms
- Amphidromus (Syndromus) fuscolabris Möllendorff, 1898; Amphidromus eichhorsti Thach, 2020; Amphidromus fuscolabris Möllendorff, 1898; Amphidromus gerberi bolovenensis Thach & F. Huber, 2018; Amphidromus goldbergi Thach & F. Huber, 2018; Amphidromus pankowskiae Thach, 2020; Amphidromus pengzhuoani Thach, 2018; Amphidromus thakhekensis Thach & F. Huber, 2017; Amphidromus zebrinus fuscolabris Möllendorff, 1898; Bulimus cruentatus Morelet, 1875

= Amphidromus cruentatus =

Species of air-breathing tree snail

Amphidromus cruentatus is a species of air-breathing tree snail, an arboreal gastropod mollusk in the family Camaenidae.

== Description ==
The height of the shell attains 33.4 mm, its diameter 16.5 mm.

(Original description in Latin) The sinistral shell is imperforate and oblong-conical. Its surface appears smooth and glossy, displaying a pale straw-colored hue that becomes greenish at the base. The apex presents a rosy coloration and is finely dotted with reddish markings. It consists of 6.5-7 slightly convex whorls, with the body whorl being ventrose and obtusely angled, and exhibiting fine ribbing on its back. The spire is a little shorter than the aperture, and the suture shows an orange color. The columella is vertical or slightly receding. The aperture is oblong, angled at the base, and milky white inside. The peristome is somewhat expanded and is tinged purplish on the inside and violet on the outside near the suture. Its margins are joined by a thin, purple callus, and the columellar margin is dilated.

== Distribution ==
The type locality is Cambodia, and the species is also present in Sekong Province and Champasak Province in Laos.
