= Lam saravane =

Music Genre

Lam saravane (Lao: ລຳສາລະວັນ, Thai: ลำสาละวัน) is a popular folk song originally from the southern province of Saravane Province of Laos, but popular throughout the Lao-speaking world, including the Isan region of Thailand, but it is also regarded as a traditional folksong and dance of Khmer culture. It is possible that the melody was borrowed from the Khmer or related Mon-Khmer groups and later re-popularised later by its recent rise of popularity in Laos and Isan.

Like in most mor lam melodies, the primary instrument is the khene. The popular versions of the song have lyrics which explain what should be done, much like an American squaredance. The song is quite popular, for its melody, and for its associated lyrics that make it a favourite at weddings, parties, and festivals.
