= List of provinces of Laos by Human Development Index =

This is a list of provinces of Laos by Human Development Index as of 2023.

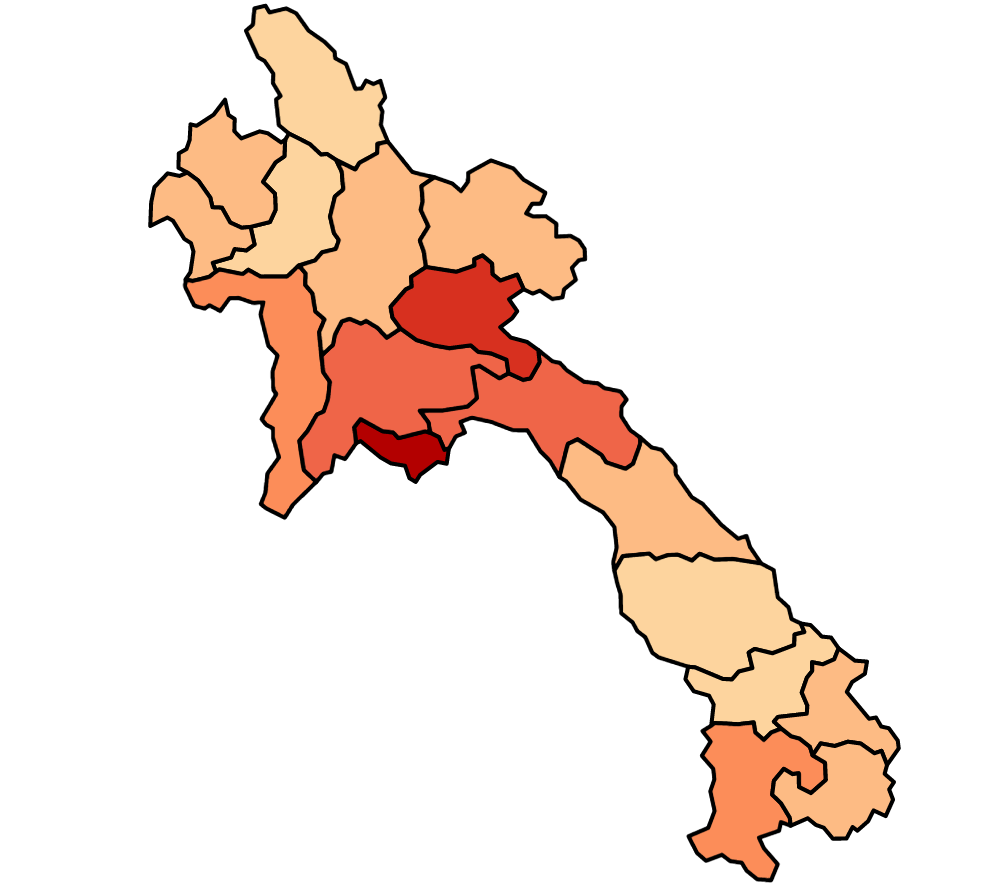
Provinces of Laos by Human Development Index as of 2017Note: the HDI values are calculated using the pre-2013 regional borders 0.795-0.745 0.744-0.695 0.694-0.645 0.644-0.595 0.594-0.545 0.544-0.495

Rank	Province	HDI (2023)
High human development
1	Vientiane Municipality	0.736
Medium human development
2	Sainyabuli	0.667
3	Bolikhamxai	0.652
4	Xiangkhouang	0.643
5	Vientiane Province	0.630
–	Laos (average)	0.617
6	Champasak	0.609
7	Luang Prabang	0.600
8	Khammouane	0.600
9	Attapeu	0.595
10	Bokeo	0.590
11	Houaphanh	0.588
12	Sekong	0.586
13	Luang Namtha	0.583
14	Oudomxay	0.579
15	Savannakhet	0.575
16	Phongsaly	0.554
Low human development
17	Salavan	0.534
