= Kaleum district =

Kaleum district ເມືອງກະລຶມ
- District
- Interactive map of Kaleum district
- Country: Laos
- Province: Sekong
- Time zone: UTC+7 (ICT)

Kaleum is a district (muang) of Sekong province in southeastern Laos. In 2013, more than 100 families who inhabited the district were displaced by the construction of the Sekong 4 Dam.

== Economy ==
In February 2021, the Lao government announced that two lignite-fired power plants will constructed in Sekong province, one of them in Kaleum District. Work is to begin in 2021 and be completed by 2025. The electricity generated will be sold to Cambodia for 7.2 US cents per kWh. The Kaleum plant will be built by Phonesack Group. It will have an installed capacity of 1,800 MW. The company will invest between US$3–4 billion, including the construction of transmission lines to export electricity to Cambodia. The government claims that coal reserves adjacent to the plant are sufficient to power it for the entire 25-year concession period.
