= Global Forest Change dataset =

Landsat-based dataset of global tree cover change

Global Forest Change dataset, also known as Hansen Global Forest Change or simply Global Forest Change, is a global remote sensing dataset of tree cover extent and change produced by researchers at the University of Maryland and collaborators. Derived from time-series analysis of the Landsat program, it provides near-global coverage at roughly 30 metres per pixel. The maintained release covers 2000-2024 and includes layers for tree canopy cover in 2000, annual tree-cover loss and year of loss, cumulative tree-cover gain for 2000–2012, reference image composites from the first and last available years, and a data mask.

First described in a 2013 paper in Science, the dataset was created to provide a globally consistent annual record of tree-cover change using one methodology. The initial study reported 2.3 million square kilometres of tree-cover loss and 0.8 million square kilometres of tree-cover gain between 2000 and 2012 and found increasing loss in the tropics despite declines elsewhere. Its development depended on the opening of the Landsat archive and cloud-based computation, allowing the product to evolve from a one-time publication into a maintained data series.

The dataset became widely used in forest monitoring, conservation, environmental accountability and national reporting. It broadened access to high-resolution forest-change data beyond specialist mapping agencies and became an important input to downstream platforms such as Global Forest Watch.

Its interpretation has also been contested. Because it measures biophysical tree-cover change rather than land-use change, mapped loss may reflect harvesting, plantation cycles, fire, storms, pests or permanent conversion to another land use. Critics argued soon after publication that it could blur natural forests and plantations, while later validation studies found that default canopy thresholds often require calibration before the data can be used reliably in national statistics or as a proxy for deforestation.

== History and development ==
The dataset addressed a long-standing problem in global forest monitoring: forest change mattered for climate, biodiversity and land-use governance, but existing measurements were often inconsistent across countries and too coarse for comparable year-by-year analysis. Matthew Hansen and colleagues set out to produce a single global record from Landsat imagery using one methodology and a common definition of tree-cover change. The resulting 2013 study analyzed 654,000 Landsat images representing 143 billion pixels to map changes between 2000 and 2012. It reported aggregate loss and gain as well as strong regional contrasts, including declining deforestation in Brazil, sharply rising loss in Indonesia, and intensive patterns of harvest and regrowth in parts of the southeastern United States.

A key precondition was the opening of the Landsat archive, which made systematic global image analysis possible at no direct data cost. Researchers at the University of Maryland developed the models used to process and characterize the imagery, while cloud-based processing by Google Earth Engine made it possible to reproduce those models at planetary scale. With that infrastructure, a processing task that would once have taken years was reduced to days. At the time, many global land-cover and forest products had spatial resolutions of about 250 to 300 metres, so the new dataset represented a major increase in detail as well as a major improvement in cross-country comparability.

The initial scientific publication was followed by a public online demo and download service that allowed users to explore the maps directly. The 2013 demo site evolved from a fixed 2000-2012 interval described in the paper to a maintained product within the Global Land Analysis and Discovery ecosystem, with later releases extending annual loss detection beyond the original study period. The current official catalog lists the maintained release as version 1.12 and gives its coverage as 2000–2024. It also notes that annual loss continues to be updated while the gain layer remains cumulative only for 2000–2012. This shift from a landmark study to a regularly updated data product made Global Forest Change a long-lived reference dataset for later forest-monitoring systems and analyses.

== Dataset structure ==
The maintained product is organized as raster layers describing baseline tree cover, change and contextual imagery. The treecover2000 layer records the percentage of canopy closure for vegetation taller than five metres in the year 2000 on a scale from 0 to 100. The loss layer records whether tree-cover loss was detected during the study period, while lossyear identifies the first year in which that loss was detected. The gain layer records cumulative tree-cover gain, but only for 2000–2012, so the maintained product combines an annually updated loss record with a gain layer fixed to the original interval. A datamask layer distinguishes mapped land surface from permanent water and areas with no data.

The downloadable country statistics are available at several minimum canopy-cover thresholds, and global aggregates derived from those tables change substantially depending on which threshold is chosen.

Threshold sensitivity of global cumulative loss
Summing the 2001-2024 country statistics gives about 6.13 million km^{2} of cumulative tree-cover loss at threshold 0, compared with about 5.17 million km^{2} at 30% and 3.19 million km^{2} at 75%.
Cumulative global tree-cover loss derived from the country statistics at different minimum 2000 canopy-cover thresholds. View chart definition.

The dataset also includes reference image composites commonly described as first and last. These are multispectral composites from the first and last available years, using Landsat bands in the red, near-infrared and shortwave infrared ranges. In the current release, lossyear is encoded from 1 to 24, corresponding to loss detected primarily in calendar years 2001 through 2024, while 0 indicates no mapped loss. Each band has a nominal pixel size of 30.92 metres. Together, these layers let users compare baseline canopy cover, the timing of detected loss and representative imagery from the beginning and end of the observation period.

== Production methodology ==
The product is built from time-series analysis of Landsat observations rather than from simple before-and-after image comparison. In the original study, tree cover was defined as all vegetation taller than five metres, forest loss was defined as stand-replacement disturbance or a change from a forest to a non-forest state, and forest gain was defined as the opposite transition. This let the same analytical logic be applied globally rather than relying on separate national classification systems.

The maintained release uses quality-assessed Landsat observations and composite imagery to characterize both baseline canopy cover and subsequent change. The reference image layers are median composites drawn from the first and last available years, assembled from growing-season observations rather than arbitrary single-date scenes. This design helps reduce cloud contamination and makes the change layers interpretable against representative baseline and end-state imagery.

Methodologically, the product is stronger at detecting abrupt canopy removal than gradual gain. The annual loss-year layer records only the first post-2000 loss event detected for each pixel, which suits stand-replacement disturbance but leaves lower-intensity or repeated events harder to encode. By contrast, gain remains a cumulative 2000-2012 layer rather than an annual series, reflecting the greater difficulty of mapping gradual regrowth consistently at global scale.

A crucial implication of the methodology is that the product measures biophysical canopy dynamics rather than legal or administrative forest categories. Tree cover in this framework includes natural forests, planted forests, wood-fiber plantations, tree crops, agroforestry systems and urban tree cover. For that reason, later analyses often combine Global Forest Change with additional layers on land use, primary forest, carbon stocks or protected-area status when they are trying to isolate narrower phenomena such as primary-forest loss or approximate deforestation more closely.

== Updates and distribution ==
After the original publication described results for 2000–2012, the product continued as a maintained dataset rather than a fixed supplement to the 2013 paper. Later releases extended annual loss detection beyond the original interval, and the current official release is version 1.12, covering 2000–2024. The product has therefore evolved from a one-time retrospective map set into a regularly updated data series, but its layers have not all advanced in parallel: annual loss has been extended through 2024, while the gain layer remains cumulative only for 2000–2012. The maintained release also reflects methodological changes over time, including reprocessing from 2011 onward, and official documentation warns that older and newer portions of the record should be compared with caution.

Aggregating the downloadable country and territory statistics at threshold 0, without a minimum canopy-cover cutoff, gives a maintained global annual tree-cover-loss series for 2001–2024. On this basis, cumulative global tree-cover loss reaches about 6.13 million km^{2} by 2024; for 2001–2012, the same aggregation gives about 2.36 million km^{2}, close to the 2.3 million km^{2} headline reported in the original 2013 paper.

Global annual tree-cover loss, 2001-2024, aggregated from downloadable country and territory statistics at threshold 0 (no canopy-cover cutoff). Loss refers to tree-cover loss, not net forest change. View chart definition.

Additional global aggregate charts
The same threshold-0 aggregation gives about 6.13 million km^{2} of cumulative global tree-cover loss by 2024, and places Russia, Brazil, Canada and the United States at the top of the cumulative country totals.
Cumulative global tree-cover loss, 2001-2024, from the threshold-0 country and territory statistics. View chart definition.
Top 10 countries by cumulative tree-cover loss, 2001-2024, using the threshold-0 country statistics. View chart definition.

The dataset is distributed through the Google Earth Engine catalog, a dedicated download service, and a GLAD web viewer for map exploration. It is also reused in downstream forest-monitoring platforms: annual tree-cover-loss layers derived from the dataset are published through Global Forest Watch's interactive map and open data portal, and the dataset's annual updates on tree cover loss and gain are described as a critical input to the Global Forest Review.

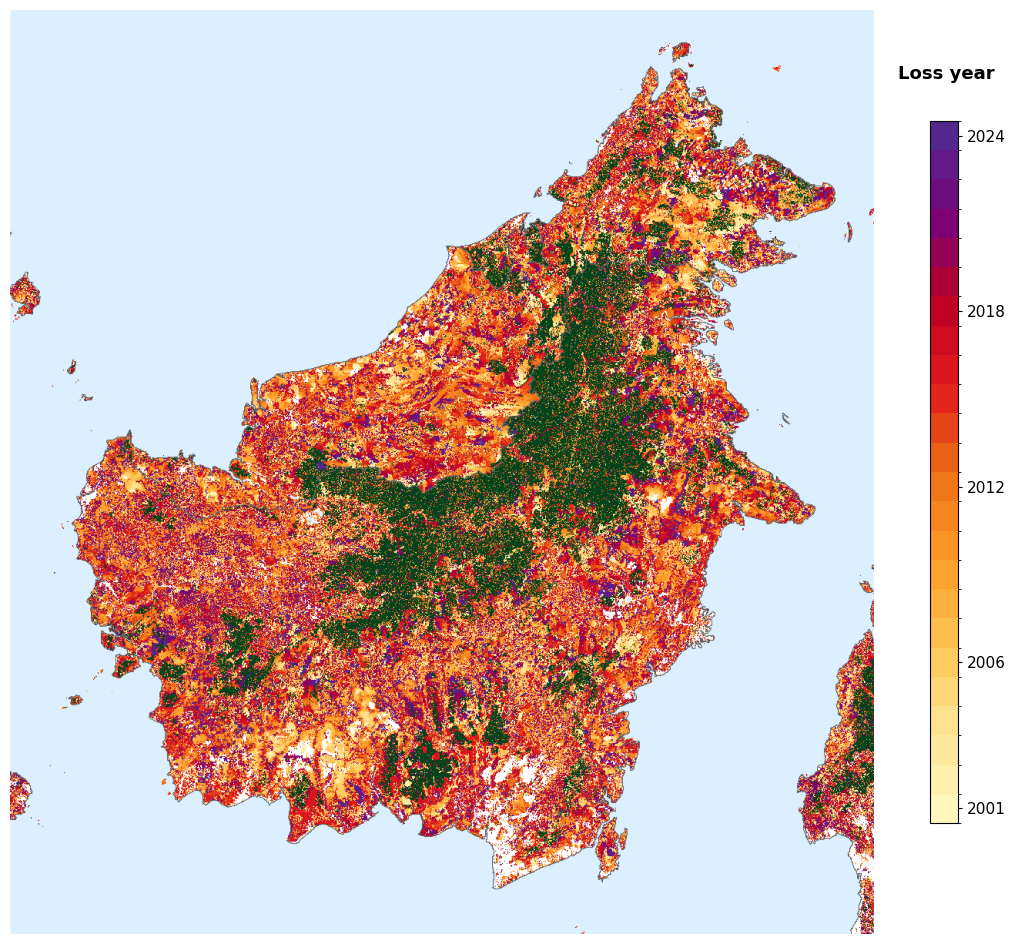
Borneo

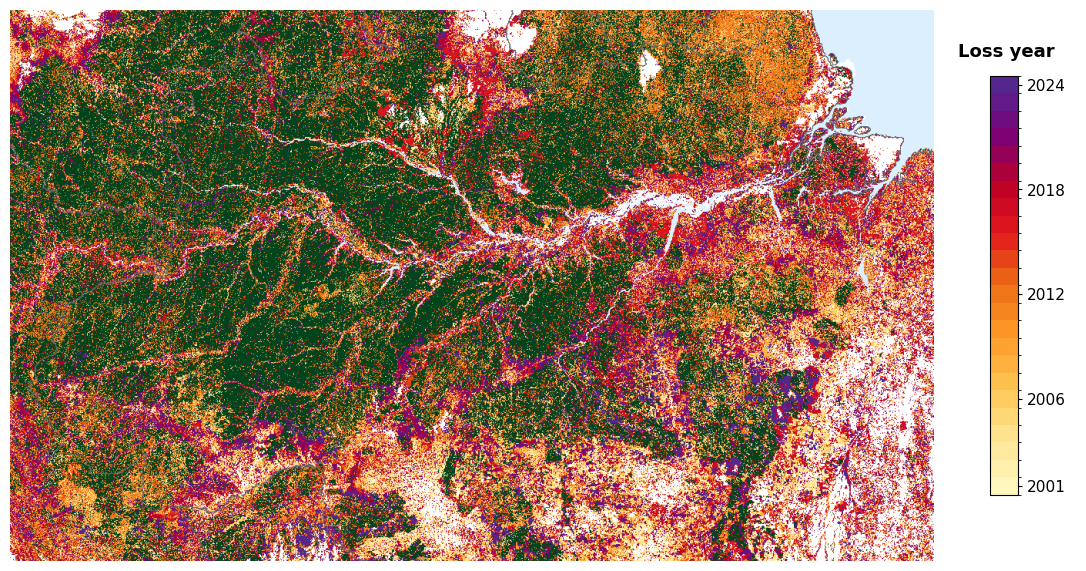
Part of the Brazilian Amazon

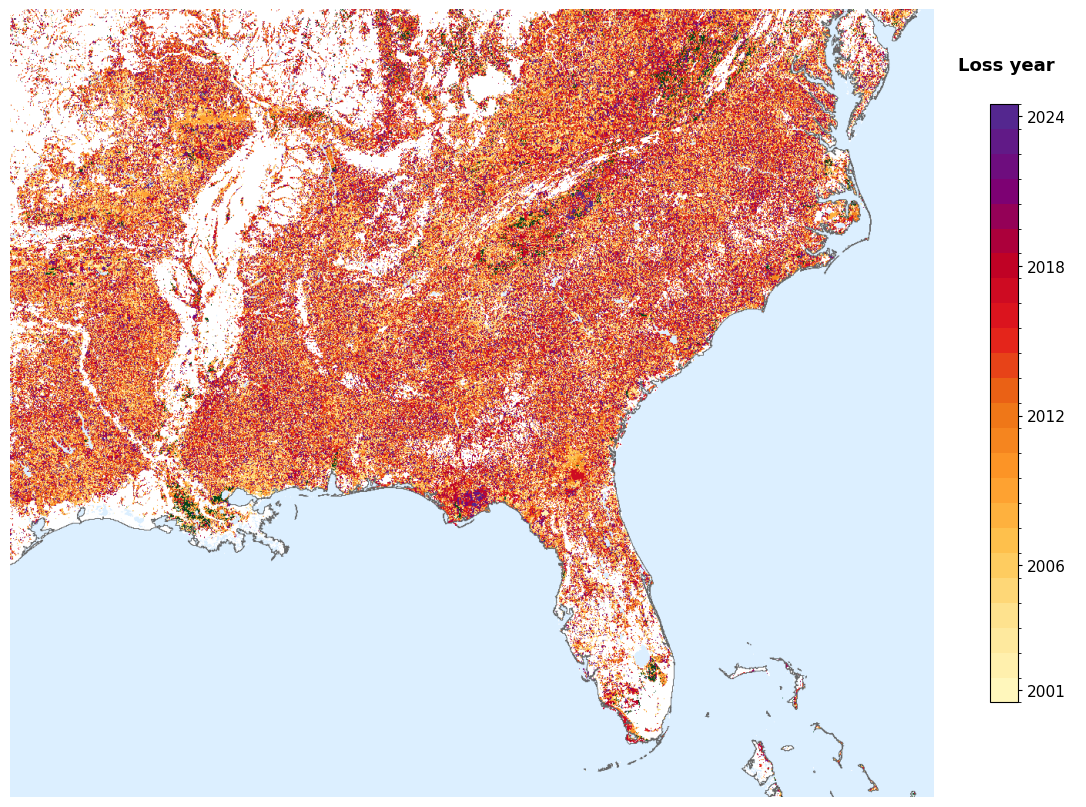
Part of the southeastern United States

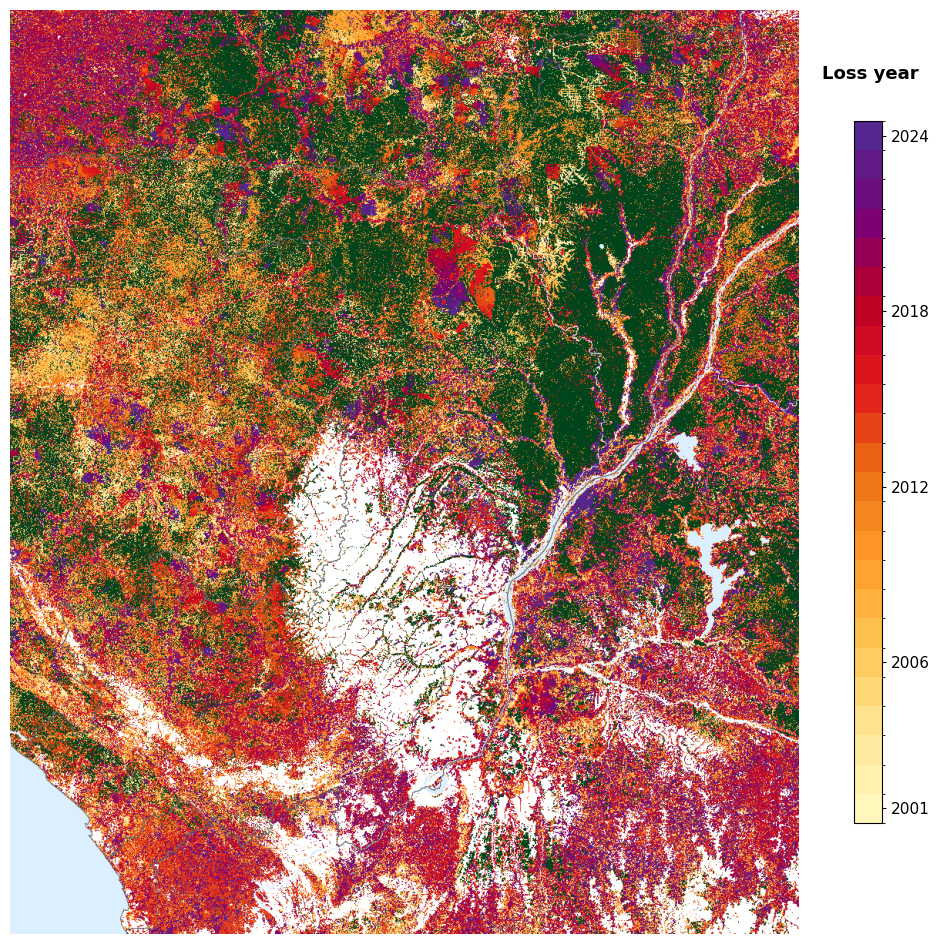
Republic of the Congo region

== Relation to Global Forest Watch ==
Global Forest Watch is a broader forest-monitoring platform that combines many geospatial layers, while Global Forest Change is one of its keystone inputs rather than a synonym for the platform itself. In practice, the dataset is often encountered through Global Forest Watch and the Global Forest Review rather than as a standalone download. The Global Forest Review describes the 30 m global map of tree-cover change as the keystone dataset underlying most of its analysis, and its methods pages draw heavily on geospatial data provided through Global Forest Watch. In that context, the more neutral term tree-cover loss is generally preferred when the dataset itself is being described, while deforestation is usually reserved for cases where additional information supports an inference of permanent, human-caused conversion to another land use.

Related downloadable country statistics also exist for humid tropical primary-forest loss and forest carbon emissions, which are narrower or more derived indicators than the native bands of the core Global Forest Change release.

Related Global Forest Watch indicators built around the dataset
In the downloadable country workbook, humid tropical primary-forest loss totals about 0.83 million km^{2} for 2002–2024, while gross forest carbon emissions at the 30% canopy threshold total about 219.4 Gt CO2e for 2001–2024.
Global annual humid tropical primary-forest loss, 2002-2024, aggregated from country statistics. This is a related downstream indicator, not a native band of the core Global Forest Change raster release. View chart definition.
Global annual gross forest carbon emissions, 2001-2024, aggregated from the country carbon statistics at the 30% canopy-cover threshold. This is a related downstream indicator rather than a native band of the core release. View chart definition.

== Uses and impact ==
Beyond its methodological importance, the dataset altered who could participate in monitoring tree-cover change. By making high-resolution global data openly available, it helped shift forest oversight from a task dominated by specialist mapping agencies to one shared by researchers, activists, companies, NGOs and public officials. Commentary has credited it with ushering in a new era of forest monitoring in which comparable evidence could be assembled quickly enough to inform public scrutiny and practical intervention, rather than only retrospective academic analysis.

In practical use, the dataset and derivative alert systems have supported rapid-response monitoring of illegal logging, mining and other forest incursions. Landsat-based alerts built from the same analytical approach were used to flag new roads and small clearings in Peru, the Republic of the Congo and Kalimantan, allowing land managers, civil society groups and companies trying to reduce forest loss in their supply chains to react more quickly. The wider effect was not merely technical: by making fresh evidence of tree-cover loss visible to a broader public, the data also strengthened accountability efforts in places where official information had previously been delayed, fragmented or difficult to access.

At national scale, assessments have found that the dataset can be useful for national forest monitoring systems and related reporting, but only when calibrated to local conditions and checked against independent reference data. In Guyana, researchers found that the default 30% tree-cover threshold overstated forest area relative to the national system, whereas a much higher threshold produced a much closer match. After this calibration, the dataset provided a good first approximation of tree-cover loss, but the authors concluded that in heavily forested countries with low deforestation rates it should not be treated as a precise annual audit instrument without higher-quality reference data. This has made it valuable as an input to national monitoring and reporting workflows while also underscoring that it is best used in combination with locally validated methods rather than as a direct substitute for national statistics.

== Limitations and criticism ==
Official guidance stresses that the dataset is a map of tree-cover dynamics, not a complete map of forest condition or land use. Not all tree cover is forest, not all tree-cover loss is deforestation, tree cover itself is only a one-dimensional description of a forest, and tree-cover gain is harder to detect than loss because it is gradual rather than abrupt. These asymmetries also mean that the loss and gain layers cannot simply be subtracted to produce a reliable measure of net forest change. Many kinds of canopy disturbance can also appear in the product as tree-cover change. Fires, storms, pests, sustainable forest management and rotational harvesting can all register as change, which is useful when the goal is to detect canopy disturbance broadly but potentially misleading when the data are used as a direct proxy for permanent human-driven forest conversion.

Criticism appeared soon after publication. A 2014 comment argued that the product did not adequately distinguish tropical forests from plantations and even some herbaceous crops, which could substantially underestimate forest loss and limit the dataset's value for local policy decisions. The original authors replied that this criticism partly reflected a misunderstanding of the product's forest definition and validation, and argued that the dataset is most informative when combined with ancillary layers such as forest type, carbon stocks and protected-area status.

Later validation studies at national scale reinforced the need for calibration to local definitions. In Gabon, researchers found that the default 30% tree-cover threshold clearly overestimated forest proportion, while a 70% threshold combined with a minimum-area filter produced estimates much closer to the national map. In Guyana, the default 30% threshold overestimated forest area by about 483,000 hectares, or 18.15%, whereas a 94% threshold corresponded much more closely to the national MRV dataset. Both studies concluded that the product can support national reporting, but only when adjusted to local definitions and checked against independent reference data rather than used as a direct substitute for national statistics.

A 2022 study focusing on protected-area complexes in the Amazon found more specific sources of disagreement. It identified mixed pixels, disagreement over baseline land cover, undetected forest gain, secondary forest and time-range issues as the main categories of mismatch between the dataset and author-generated comparison maps. Mixed pixels were the largest single source of dissimilarity, and the authors argued that limited treatment of regrowth after 2012 and confusion around secondary forest could cause some regenerating or partially forested areas to be mapped as deforested. They concluded that the dataset tended to overestimate deforestation in their case studies, while the comparison maps tended to underestimate it, suggesting that the most plausible rates lay between the two products.
