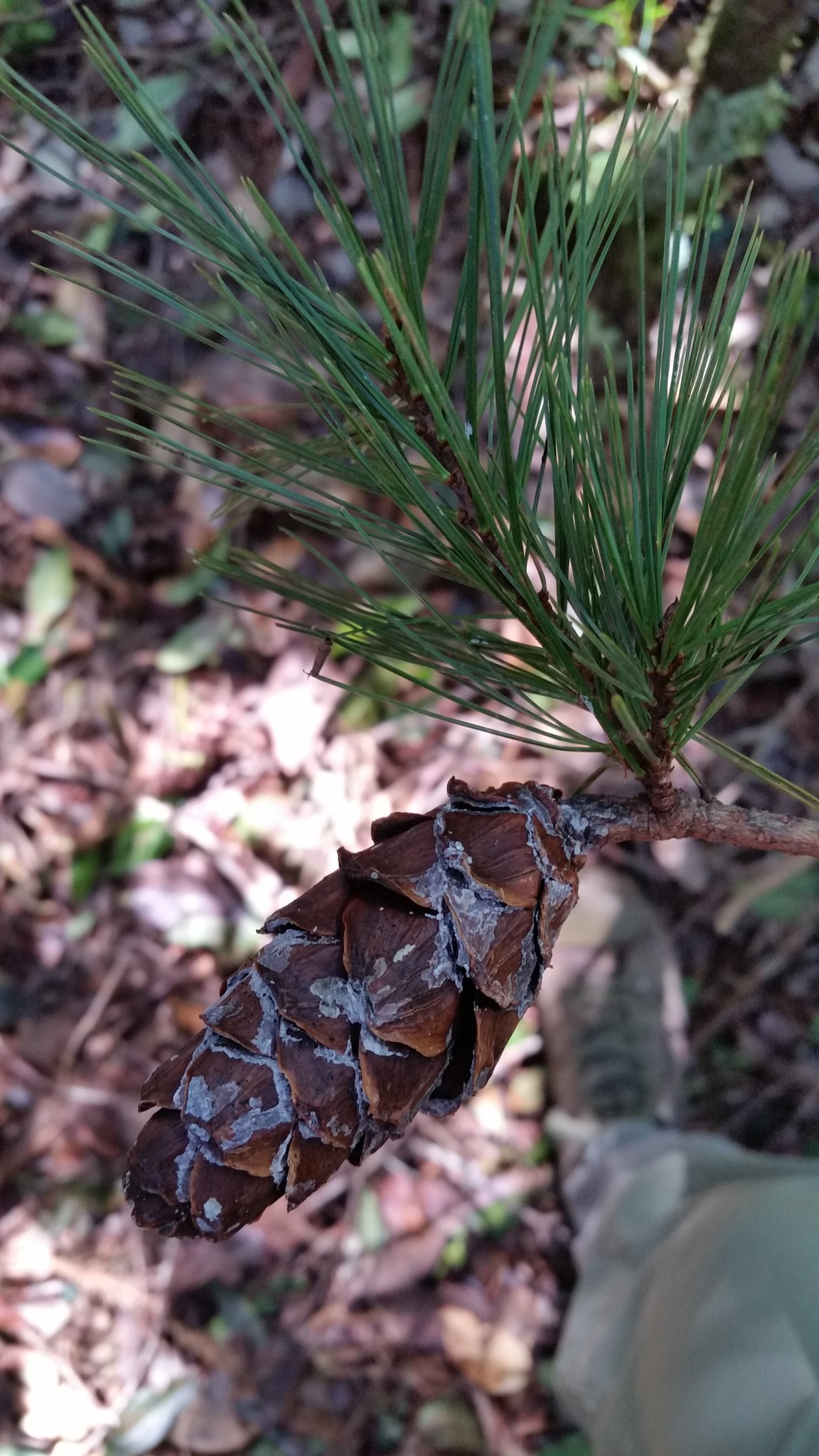

Conservation status
- Near Threatened (IUCN 3.1)

Scientific classification
- Kingdom: Plantae
- Clade: Tracheophytes
- Clade: Gymnosperms
- Division: Pinophyta
- Class: Pinopsida
- Order: Pinales
- Family: Pinaceae
- Genus: Pinus
- Subgenus: P. subg. Strobus
- Section: P. sect. Quinquefoliae
- Subsection: P. subsect. Strobus
- Species: P. dalatensis

Binomial name
- Pinus dalatensis Ferré

Synonyms
- Pinus wallichiana var. dalatensis (Ferré) Silba

= Pinus dalatensis =

Species of conifer

Pinus dalatensis, also known as Vietnamese white pine or Dalat pine, is a species of pine endemic to Indochina. In Vietnam it grows in the mountains of the central and south-central parts of the country at elevations of 1,400 to 2,300 metres (4,600 to 7,500 ft). Only recently confirmed from Laos, the population located within the Nakai-Nam Theun Biodiversity Conservation Area is the largest, at the lowest elevation, and the northernmost of the known populations of P. dalatensis.

== Description ==
Pinus dalatensis is a medium-sized evergreen tree growing to 30 to 40 metres (98 to 131 ft) tall. It is a member of the white pine group, Pinus subgenus Strobus, and like all members of that group, the leaves ('needles') are in fascicles (bundles) of five, with a deciduous sheath. The needles are finely serrated, and (3-)5–14 cm long.

The cones are slender, 6 to 23 centimetres (2.4 to 9.1 in) long and 2 to 4 centimetres (0.79 to 1.57 in) broad (closed), opening to 3 to 9 centimetres (1.2 to 3.5 in) broad; the scales are thin and flexible. The seeds are small, 6 to 8 millimetres (0.24 to 0.31 in) long, and have a long slender wing 18 to 25 millimetres (0.71 to 0.98 in) long. It is most closely related to the blue pine Pinus wallichiana from the Himalaya.

=== Subspecies ===
It is divided into two subspecies:

- Pinus dalatensis subsp. dalatensis. Da Lat region, between 11°50'N and 12°30'N. Cones 6–17 cm long.
- Pinus dalatensis subsp. procera Businský. Central Vietnam, between 15°00'N and 16°20'N. Cones 13–23 cm long.
