= La Mam district =

La Mam district ເມືອງລະມາມ
- District
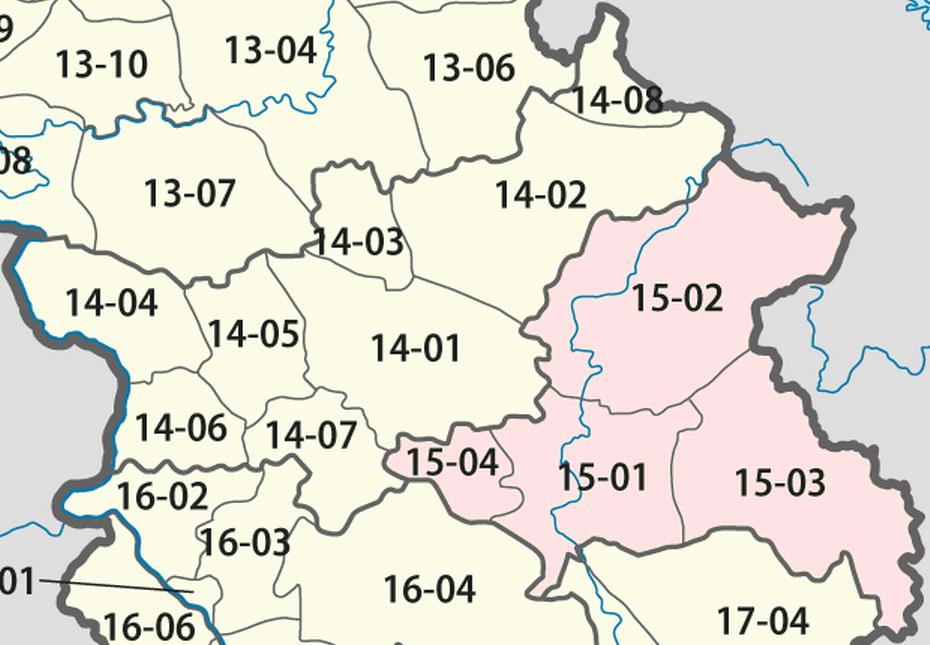
- La Mam district in the Sekong Province, Laos
- Interactive map of La Mam district
- Country: Laos
- Admin. division: Sekong province
- Time zone: UTC+7 (ICT)

La Mam district (Lao: ເມືອງລະມາມ) is a district of Sekong province, Laos.

== Economy ==
In February 2021, the Lao government announced that two lignite-fired power plants will constructed in Sekong Province, one of them in La Mam District. Work is to begin in 2021 and be completed by 2025. The electricity generated will be sold to Cambodia for 7.2 US cents per kWh. The La Mam coal-fired, 700 MW plant will be built in the district by a Chinese company that will invest over US$1 billion in the project. The government claims that coal reserves adjacent to the plant are sufficient to power it for the entire 25-year concession period.
