= Outline of Laos =

Landlocked country in Southeast Asia

The Flag of Laos

The Emblem of Laos

The location of Laos

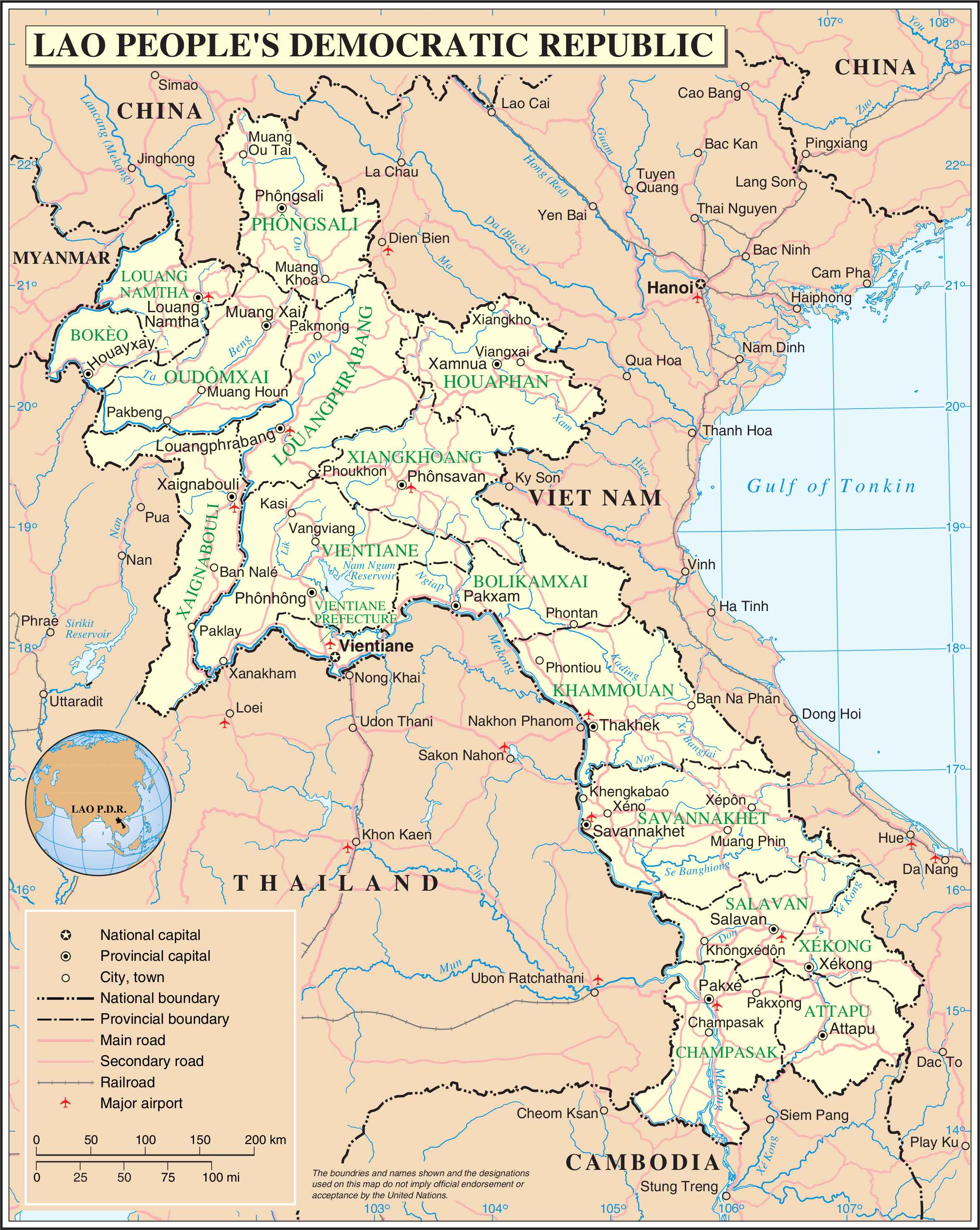
Lao People's Democratic Republic

The following outline is provided as an overview of and topical guide to Laos:

Laos is a landlocked, sovereign nation in Southeast Asia. Laos borders Burma (Myanmar) and China to the northwest, Vietnam to the east, Cambodia to the south, and Thailand to the west. Laos traces its history to the Kingdom of Lan Xang or "Land of a Million Elephants", which existed from the fourteenth to the eighteenth century. After a period as a French protectorate, it gained independence in 1949. A long civil war ended officially when the communist Pathet Lao movement came to power in 1975, but strife between competing between factions continued for several years.

Private enterprise has increased since the late-1990s when economic reforms, including rapid business licensing, were introduced. Laos is still ranked low for economic and political freedom. The economy of Laos grew at 6.89% in 2017, 35th fastest in the world. Eighty percent of the employed practice subsistence agriculture. The country's ethnic make-up is diverse, with around 70% belonging to the largest ethnic group, the Lao.

== General reference ==
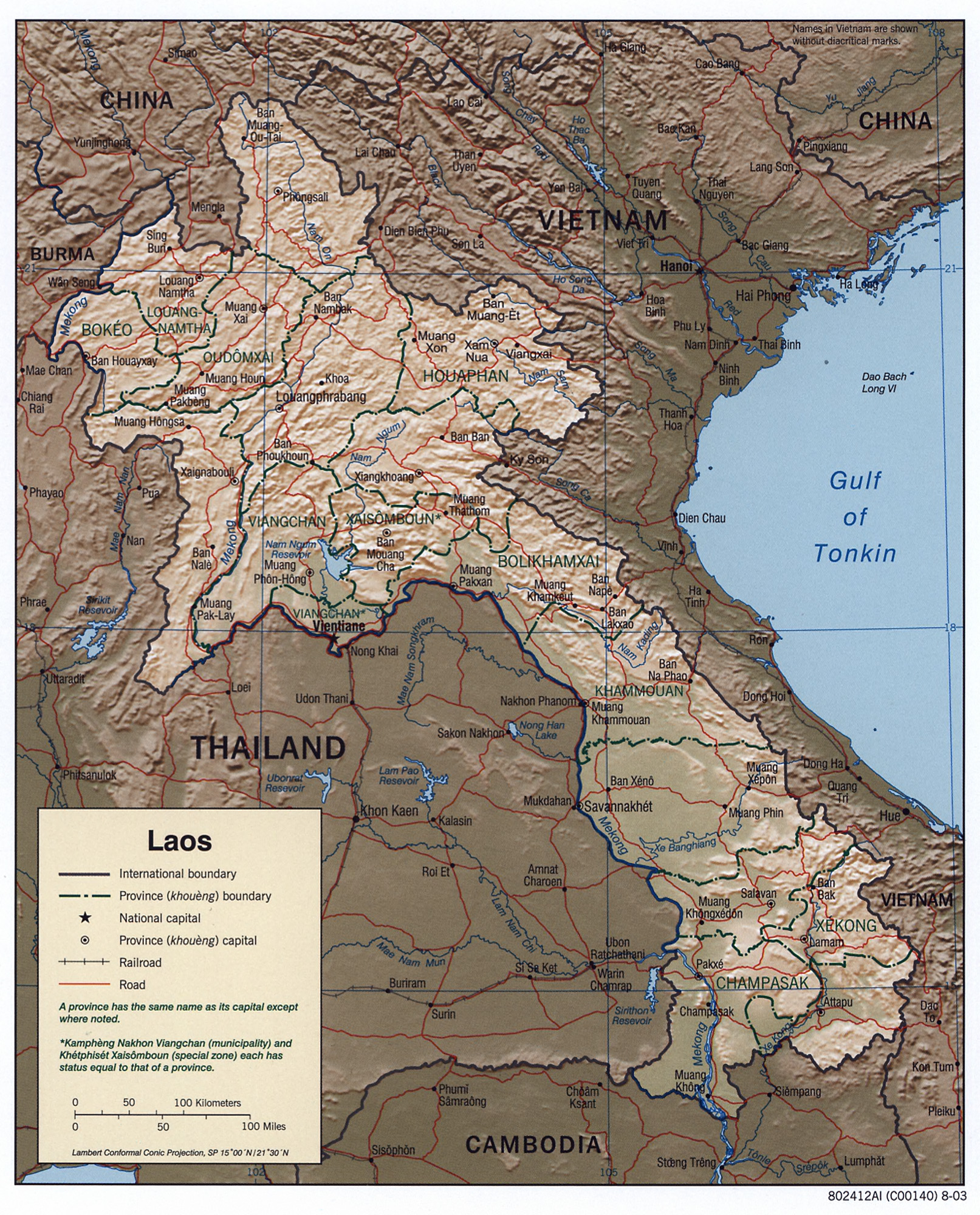
An enlargeable relief map of Laos

- Pronunciation:
- Common English country name: Laos
- Official English country name: The Lao People's Democratic Republic
- Adjectives: Lao, Laotian
- Demonym(s):
- Etymology: Name of Laos
- International rankings of Laos
- ISO country codes: LA, LAO, 418
- ISO region codes: See ISO 3166-2:LA
- Internet country code top-level domain: .la

== Geography of Laos ==
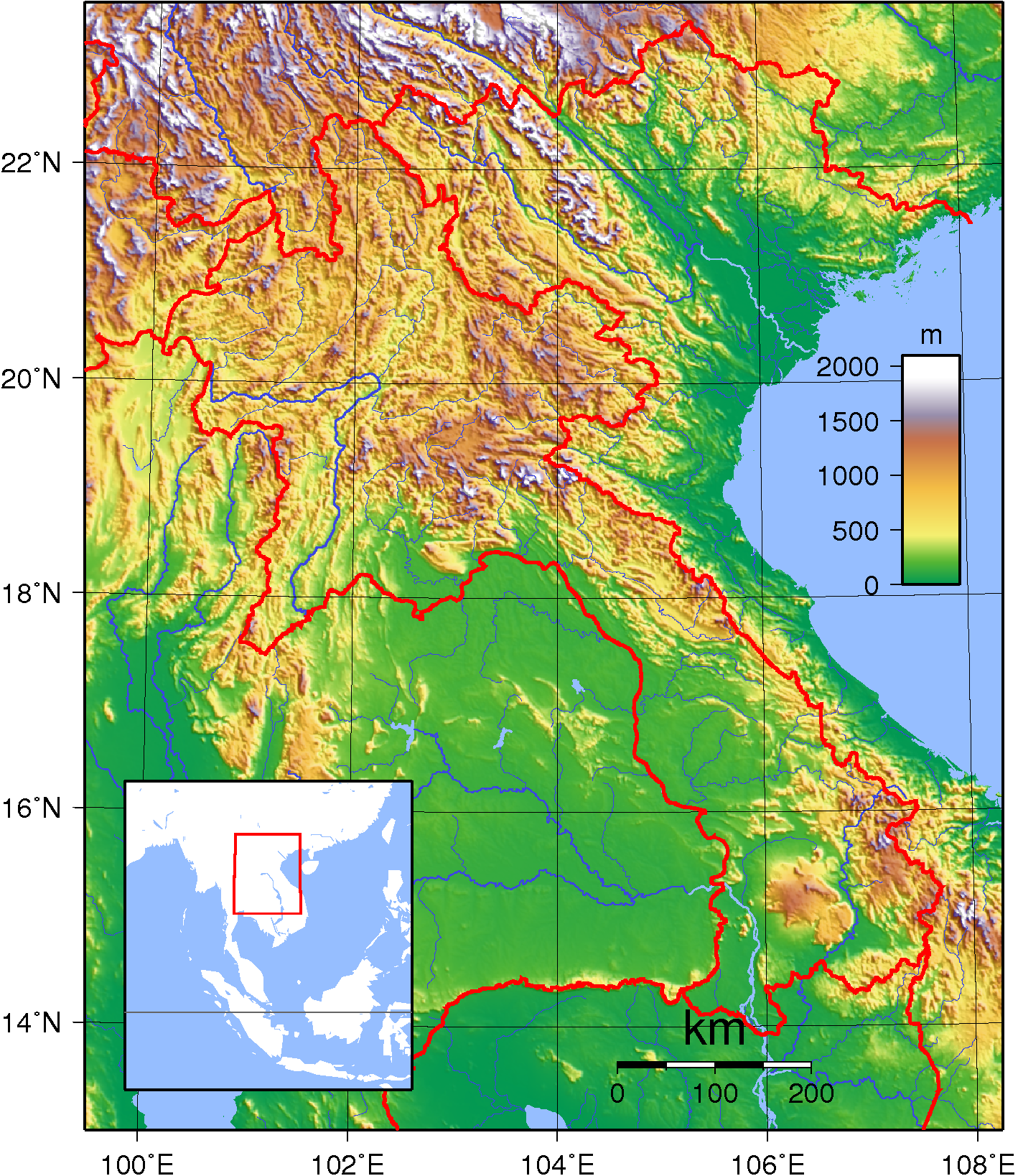
An enlargeable topographic map of Laos

Geography of Laos

- Laos is: a landlocked country
- Location:
  - Northern Hemisphere and Eastern Hemisphere
  - Eurasia
    - Asia
      - South East Asia
        - Indochina
  - Time zone: ICT
  - Extreme points of Laos
    - High: Phou Bia 2,817 m (9,242 ft)
    - Low: Mekong 70 m (230 ft)
  - Land boundaries: 5,083 km

Vietnam 2,130 km
Thailand 1,754 km
Cambodia 541 km
China 423 km
Myanmar 235 km

- Coastline: none

- Population of Laos: 7,275,560 (2020) (105th most populous country)
- Area of Laos: 230,800 km^{2} (89,112 mi^{2})
- Atlas of Laos

=== Environment of Laos ===
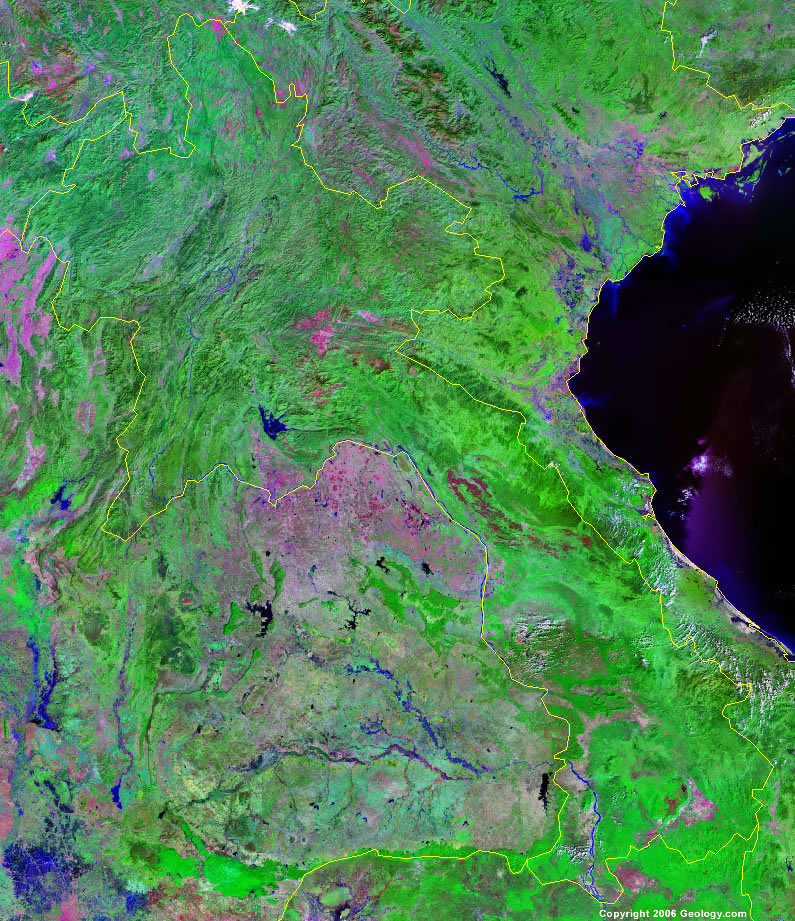
An enlargeable false color satellite image of Laos

- Climate of Laos
- Protected areas of Laos
- Wildlife of Laos
  - Fauna of Laos
    - Birds of Laos
    - Mammals of Laos

==== Natural geographic features of Laos ====
- Rivers of Laos
- World Heritage Sites in Laos: None

=== Regions of Laos ===
==== Ecoregions of Laos ====
List of ecoregions in Laos

==== Administrative divisions of Laos ====
Administrative divisions of Laos

- Provinces of Laos
  - Districts of Laos

===== Provinces of Laos =====
Provinces of Laos

===== Districts of Laos =====
Districts of Laos

===== Municipalities of Laos =====
- Capital of Laos: Vientiane
- Cities of Laos

=== Demography of Laos ===
Demographics of Laos

== Government and politics of Laos ==
Politics of Laos

- Form of government:
- Capital of Laos: Vientiane
- Elections in Laos
- Political parties in Laos

=== Branches of the government of Laos ===
Government of Laos

==== Executive branch of the government of Laos ====
- Head of state: President of Laos,
- Head of government: Prime Minister of Laos,

==== Legislative branch of the government of Laos ====
- Parliament of Laos (bicameral)
  - Upper house: Senate of Laos
  - Lower house: House of Commons of Laos

==== Judicial branch of the government of Laos ====
Court system of Laos

=== Foreign relations of Laos ===
Foreign relations of Laos

- Diplomatic missions in Laos
- Diplomatic missions of Laos
- Laos-Vietnam relations

==== International organization membership ====
The Lao People's Democratic Republic is a member of:

- Asian Development Bank (ADB)
- Asia-Pacific Telecommunity (APT)
- Association of Southeast Asian Nations (ASEAN)
- Association of Southeast Asian Nations Regional Forum (ARF)
- Colombo Plan (CP)
- East Asia Summit (EAS)
- Food and Agriculture Organization (FAO)
- Group of 77 (G77)
- International Bank for Reconstruction and Development (IBRD)
- International Civil Aviation Organization (ICAO)
- International Criminal Police Organization (Interpol)
- International Development Association (IDA)
- International Federation of Red Cross and Red Crescent Societies (IFRCS)
- International Finance Corporation (IFC)
- International Fund for Agricultural Development (IFAD)
- International Labour Organization (ILO)
- International Monetary Fund (IMF)
- International Olympic Committee (IOC)
- International Organization for Standardization (ISO) (subscriber)
- International Red Cross and Red Crescent Movement (ICRM)
- International Telecommunication Union (ITU)
- Inter-Parliamentary Union (IPU)
- Multilateral Investment Guarantee Agency (MIGA)
- Nonaligned Movement (NAM)
- Organisation internationale de la Francophonie (OIF)
- Organisation for the Prohibition of Chemical Weapons (OPCW)
- Permanent Court of Arbitration (PCA)
- United Nations (UN)
- United Nations Conference on Trade and Development (UNCTAD)
- United Nations Educational, Scientific, and Cultural Organization (UNESCO)
- United Nations Industrial Development Organization (UNIDO)
- Universal Postal Union (UPU)
- World Customs Organization (WCO)
- World Federation of Trade Unions (WFTU)
- World Health Organization (WHO)
- World Intellectual Property Organization (WIPO)
- World Meteorological Organization (WMO)
- World Tourism Organization (UNWTO)
- World Trade Organization (WTO) (observer)

=== Law and order in Laos ===
Law of Laos

- Constitution of Laos
- Crime in Laos
- Human rights in Laos
  - LGBT rights in Laos
  - Freedom of religion in Laos
- Law enforcement in Laos

=== Military of Laos ===
Military of Laos

- Command
  - Commander-in-chief:
- Forces
  - Army of Laos
  - Navy of Laos: None
- Military history of Laos

== History of Laos ==
History of Laos

- Timeline of the history of Laos
- Current events of Laos
- Military history of Laos

== Culture of Laos ==
Culture of Laos

- Cuisine of Laos
- Festivals in Laos
- Languages of Laos
- List of museums in Laos
- National symbols of Laos
  - Coat of arms of Laos
  - Flag of Laos
  - National anthem of Laos
- Lao people
- Prostitution in Laos
- Public holidays in Laos
- Religion in Laos
  - Buddhism in Laos
  - Christianity in Laos
  - Hinduism in Laos
  - Islam in Laos
- World Heritage Sites in Laos: None

=== Art in Laos ===
- Literature of Laos
- Music of Laos
- Theatre in Laos

=== Sports in Laos ===
Sports in Laos

- Football in Laos
- Laos at the Olympics

== Economy and infrastructure of Laos ==
Economy of Laos

- Economic rank, by nominal GDP (2007): 141st (one hundred and forty first)
- Agriculture in Laos
- Communications in Laos
  - Internet in Laos
- Companies of Laos
- Currency of Laos: Kip
  - ISO 4217: LAK
- Energy in Laos
- Tourism in Laos
- Transport in Laos
  - Airports in Laos
  - Rail transport in Laos

== Education in Laos ==
Education in Laos

== Health in Laos ==
Health in Laos

== See also ==
Laos

- Index of Laos-related articles
- List of international rankings
- List of Laos-related topics
- Member state of the United Nations
- Outline of Asia
- Outline of geography
