= Protected areas of Laos =

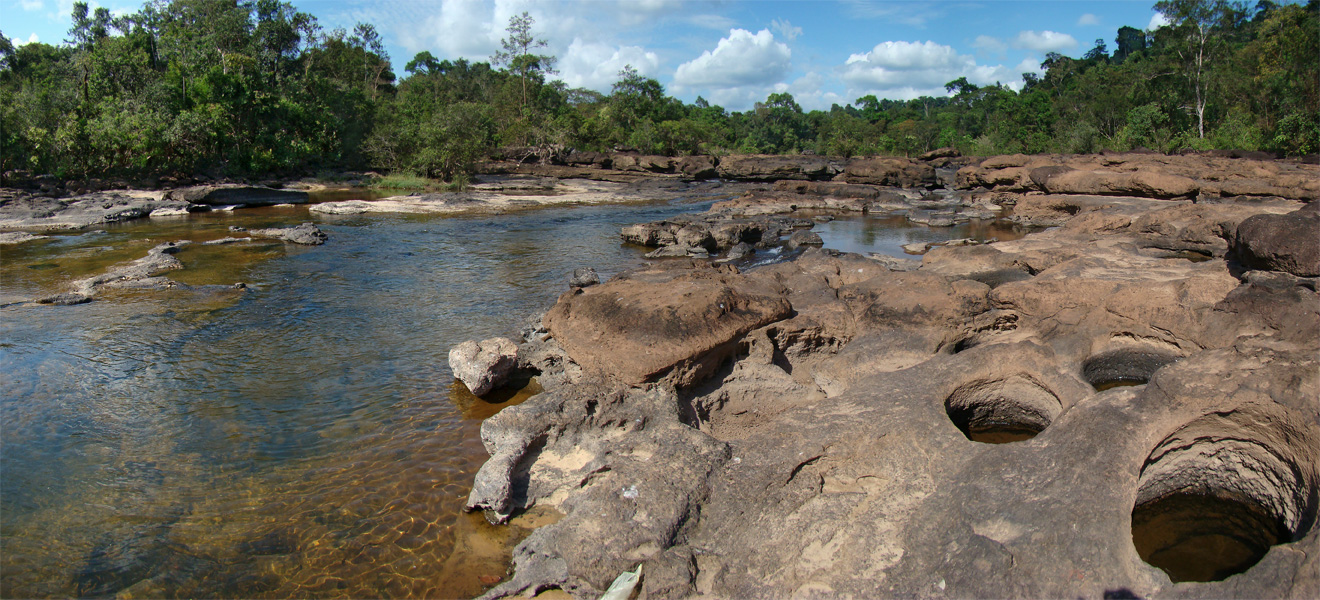
Phou Khao Khouay National Protected Area

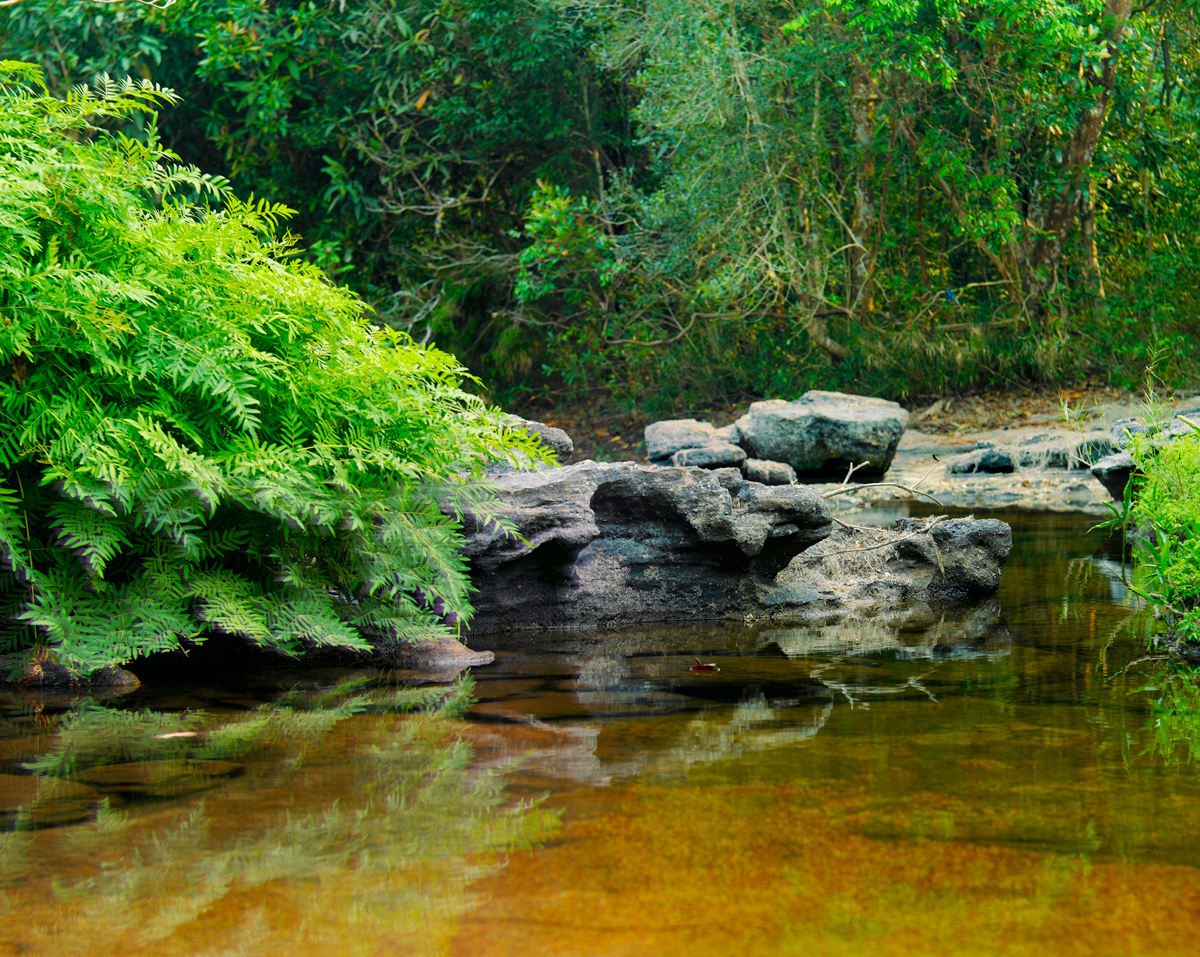
Phou Khao Khouay

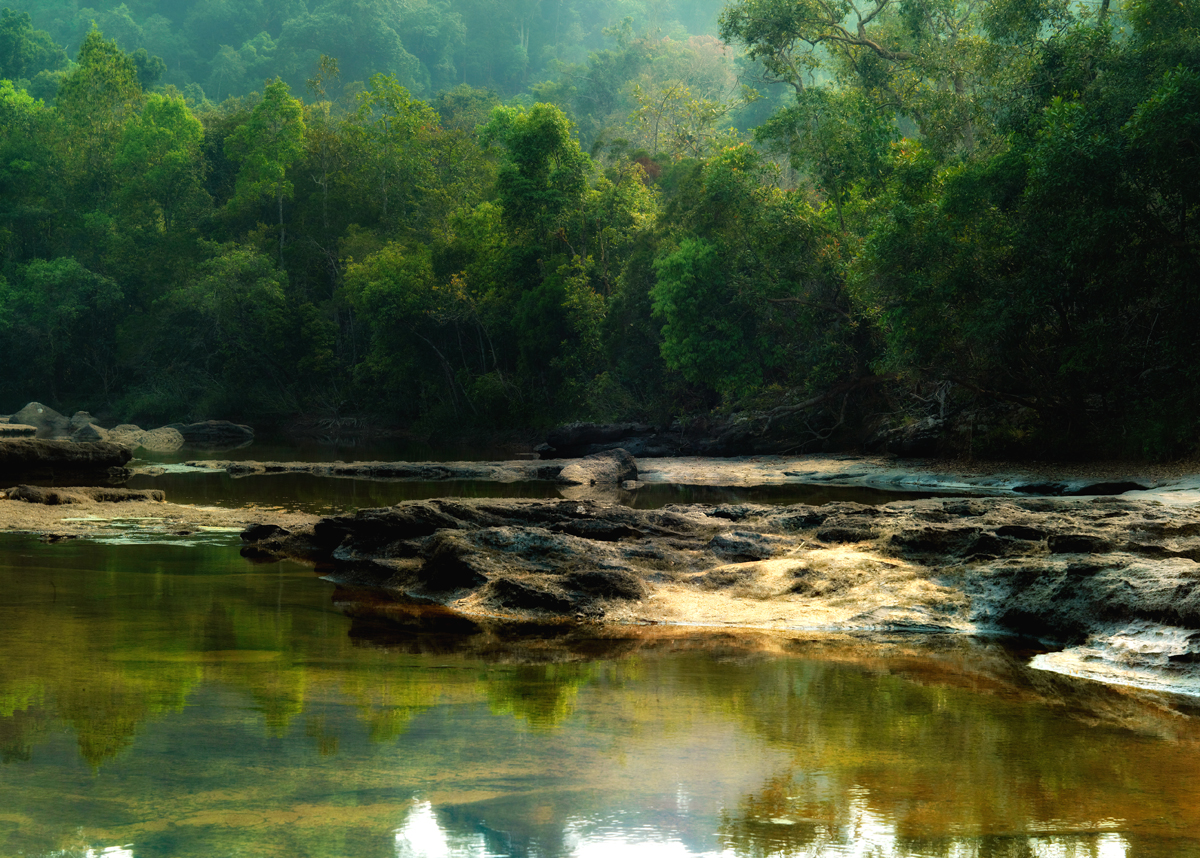
Phou Khao Khouay

Protected areas in Laos include:

== National parks ==
- Dong Hua Sao National Park (99.8 km^{2} reported area; 1004 km^{2} GIS-calculated area)
- Hin Namno National Park (941.21 km^{2})
- Nakai-Nam Theun National Park (4277 km^{2})
- Nam Et-Phou Louey National Park, (4107.1 km^{2} reported area; 4828 km^{2} GIS-calculated area)
- Phou Khao Khouay National Park (191.94 km^{2})
- Xe Pian National Park (258.63 km^{2} reported area; 2578 km^{2} GIS-calculated area)

== National biodiversity conservation areas (national protected areas) ==
- Dong Ampham National Biodiversity Conservation Area, 20,000 ha
- Dong Phou Vieng
- Eld's Deer Sanctuary
- Kounxe Nongma
- Laving Lavern
- Nam Ha National Biodiversity Conservation Area (2224 km^{2})
- Nam Kading National Biodiversity Conservation Area, 169,000 ha
- Nam Kan, 77,500 ha
- Nam Phouy (Nam Poui) National Biodiversity Conservation Area
- Nam Xam National Biodiversity Conservation Area, 70,000 ha
- Phou Daen Din
- Phou Hi Phi
- Phou Hin Poun (Phou Hinpoun or Khammouane Limestone)
- Phou Pha Nang
- Phou Sabot Phoungchong
- Phou Xang He National Biodiversity Conservation Area, 109,900 acre
- Phou Xieng Thong (Phou Xiang Thong) National Biodiversity Conservation Area, 120,000 ha
- Xe Bang Nouan (Xe Bang Nouane) National Biodiversity Conservation Area, 150,000 ha
- Xe Xap National Biodiversity Conservation Area, 133,500 ha
- Yodnammo-Phousamsoum National Biodiversity Conservation Area

== Other protected areas ==
- Bokeo Nature Reserve
- Buddha Park
- Houei Nhang Conservation Area
- Phou-Chomvoy Provincial Protected Area
- Tor 10 Provincial Protected Area
- Xekhampo-Boloven Plateau Hunting Reserve

== International designations ==
=== ASEAN Heritage Parks ===
- Nam Ha
- Nam Poui (proposed)
- Phou Xieng Thong (proposed)

=== Ramsar sites (Wetlands of International Importance) ===
- Beung Kiat Ngong Wetlands
- Xe Champhone Wetlands

== See also ==
- Geography of Laos
- Conservation in Laos
- Fauna of Laos
- Flora of Laos
- Wildlife of Laos

== Source ==
- UNEP-WCMC (2023). Protected Area Profile for Lao People's Democratic Republic from the World Database on Protected Areas. Retrieved 2 June 2023.
