= Beung Kiat Ngong Wetlands =

Wetland complex in Champassak Province, Laos

Designations

Ramsar Wetland
- Official name: Beung Kiat Ngong Wetlands
- Designated: 16 June 2010
- Reference no.: 1941

Beung Kiat Ngong Wetlands is located in Champassak Province, southern Laos. Wetland complex is made up of diverse wetland types, including lakes, swamps, peat lands and marshes.

== Geography ==
The Bung Kiat Ngong wetland cover 2,360 hectares and is located in Pathoumphone District, Champassak Province in southern Laos, 56 km south of the provincial capital, Pakse. The southern parts of the wetland and most of the village of Ban Kiat Ngong, are located within the Xe Pian National Protected Area (NPA). Beung Kiat Ngong wetland is included the Indo-Burma Biodiversity Hotspot or the Central Indochina area.

Beung Kiat Ngong wetlands has a catchment of more than 6,000 ha, of which 2,360 ha are a part of Xe Pian National Protected Area. Wetlands includes about 400 ha of high quality peat land and about 1,000 ha of seasonal semi-peatland with a low quality of peat.

=== Climate ===
The Beung Kiat Ngong Wetland is situated in a monsoonal zone with one distinct dry season (late October-early May) and one distinct wet season (late May-October). Temperatures range from a minimum low of 14.5oC in January (humidity 32-95%) to a maximum high of 38.3oC in April (humidity 39-96%), with humidity approaching 99% throughout the wet season. Average annual rainfall at the site is around 2,000 mm with up to one third of the rainfall recorded during the month of August.

== Importance ==
The wetland has high biodiversity value, supports threatened species such as the fishing cat, leopard cat, sambar and Malayan snail-eating turtle. The site is important for flood control and maintaining ground water. The forest of the wetland is rich due to the quality soil and abundance of water, and seasonal and perennial flooded grasses are found here. Ngong Wetlands is also one of the only places in Laos where peatland areas can be found.

== Governance and population ==
There are a 20 villages with a population of 7,400 people within the wetland site boundaries. The Agriculture and Forestry District Office and the Water Resources and Environment Agency are responsible for the management of this site. Local people are engage in subsistence and commercial fishing, harvesting of wild vegetables, rice and non-timber products. There is a population of domesticated elephants in the area. The wetlands area also contains an important cultural site, Phou Asa temple located at western side of the wetland.
