= ASEAN Heritage Parks =

Group of protected areas in Southeast Asia

ASEAN Heritage Parks (AHP) are selected protected areas in the ASEAN region that are known for their unique biodiversity and ecosystems, wilderness and outstanding values in scenic, cultural, educational, research, recreational and tourism. Its vision is "An ASEAN region whose biological is conserved, sustainably managed and used, and equitably shared for the well-being of its peoples." The ASEAN Centre for Biodiversity (ACB) in the Philippines serves as the secretariat of the ASEAN Heritage Parks Programme.

The ASEAN Heritage Parks were established as the ASEAN national heritage parks, nature parks and wild life sanctuary on 29 November 1984 when only 6 countries: Brunei, Indonesia, Malaysia, Philippines, Singapore and Thailand were member countries. They became known by the present name on 18 December 2003 after Cambodia, Laos, Myanmar and Vietnam joined the organisation between 1995 and 1999. Through declarations, ASEAN member countries agreed that, "common cooperation is necessary to conserve and manage the parks for the development and implementation of regional conservation as well as regional mechanisms complementary to national efforts to implement conservation measures.

Fifty ASEAN Heritage Parks have been designated as of 2019.

Nine sites are designated as UNESCO World Heritage Sites: Kinabalu National Park of Malaysia; Gunung Mulu National Park of Malaysia; Lorentz National Park of Indonesia; Kerinci Seblat National Park and Gunung Leuser National Park as 2 of 3 national parks that form Tropical Rainforest Heritage of Sumatra of Indonesia; Tubbataha Reefs Natural Park of the Philippines; Mount Hamiguitan Range Wildlife Sanctuary of the Philippines; Khao Yai National Park and Kaeng Krachan National Park of Thailand.

== List of parks ==
The following is a list of areas designated as ASEAN Heritage Parks.

No.	Park	Country	Date of declaration
1	Tasek Merimbun Heritage Park	Brunei	29 November 1984
2	Kerinci Seblat National Park	Indonesia	29 November 1984
3	Mount Leuser National Park	Indonesia	29 November 1984
4	Lorentz National Park	Indonesia	29 November 1884
5	Gunung Mulu National Park	Malaysia	29 November 1984
6	Kinabalu National Park	Malaysia	29 November 1984
7	Taman Negara National Park	Malaysia	29 November 1984
8	Mount Apo Natural Park	Philippines	29 November 1984
9	Mounts Iglit–Baco National Park	Philippines	29 November 1984
10	Khao Yai National Park	Thailand	29 November 1984
11	Tarutao National Marine Park	Thailand	29 November 1984
12	Preah Monivong National Park (Bokor)	Cambodia	18 December 2003
13	Virachey National Park	Cambodia	18 December 2003
14	Nam Ha National Protected Area	Laos	18 December 2003
15	Alaungdaw Kathapa National Park	Myanmar	18 December 2003
16	Hkakaborazi National Park	Myanmar	18 November 2004
17	Indawgyi Lake Wildlife Sanctuary	Myanmar	18 December 2003
18	Inlé Lake Wildlife Sanctuary	Myanmar	18 December 2003
19	Lampi Island Marine National Park	Myanmar	18 December 2003
20	Meinmahla Kyun Wildlife Sanctuary	Myanmar	18 December 2003
21	Sungei Buloh Wetland Reserve	Singapore	18 December 2003
22	Ao Phang Nga National Park, Surin Islands and Similan Islands	Thailand	18 December 2003
23	Kaeng Krachan National Park	Thailand	18 December 2003
24	Ba Be National Park	Vietnam	18 December 2003
25	Chư Mom Ray National Park	Vietnam	18 December 2003
26	Hoàng Liên Sa Pa National Park	Vietnam	18 November 2003
27	Kon Ka Kinh National Park	Vietnam	18 December 2003
28	Mount Kitanglad Range Natural Park	Philippines	30 October 2009
29	Mount Malindang Range Natural Park	Philippines	10 October 2011
30	Bukit Timah Nature Reserve	Singapore	18 October 2011
31	Natmataung National Park	Myanmar	25 September 2012
32	U Minh Thượng National Park	Vietnam	25 September 2012
33	Mount Makiling Forest Reserve	Philippines	25 September 2013
34	Mount Hamiguitan Range Wildlife Sanctuary	Philippines	21 October 2014
35	Tubbataha Reefs Natural Park	Philippines	21 October 2014
36	Way Kambas National Park	Indonesia	28 October 2015
37	Timpoong and Hibok-Hibok Natural Monument	Philippines	28 October 2015
38	Bái Tử Long National Park	Vietnam	30 September 2016
39	Thousand Islands National Park	Indonesia	13 November 2017
40	Wakatobi National Park	Indonesia	13 November 2017
41	Bantimurung–Bulusaraung National Park	Indonesia	17 August 2018
42	Agusan Marsh Wildlife Sanctuary	Philippines	2018
43	Bidoup Núi Bà National Park	Vietnam	2018
44	Vu Quang National Park	Vietnam	2018
45	Hat Chao Mai National Park and Mu Ko Libong islands	Thailand	2019
46	Mu Ko Ang Thong National Park	Thailand	2019
47	Lò Gò–Xa Mát National Park	Vietnam	2019
48	Ngọc Linh Nature Reserve	Vietnam	2019
49	Htamanthi Wildlife Sanctuary	Myanmar	2019
50	Khao Sok National Park	Thailand	18 February 2021
51	Endau-Rompin National Park	Malaysia	7 July 2022
52	Pasonanca Natural Park	Philippines	13 May 2024
53	Côn Đảo National Park	Vietnam	28 April 2023
54	Mount Inayawan Range Natural Park	Philippines	28 June 2023
55	Phou Xieng Thong National Protected Area	Laos	19 September 2024
56	Nam Phouy (Nam Poui) National Protected Area	Laos	3 October 2024
57	Balinsasayao Twin Lakes Natural Park	Philippines	2025
