= Amolops akhaorum =

Conservation status
- Data Deficient (IUCN 3.1)

Scientific classification
- Kingdom: Animalia
- Phylum: Chordata
- Class: Amphibia
- Order: Anura
- Family: Ranidae
- Genus: Amolops
- Species: A. akhaorum

Binomial name
- Amolops akhaorum Stuart, Bain, Phimmachak, and Spence, 2010

Species of amphibian

Amolops akhaorum is a species of true frogs (family Ranidae) discovered in 2007 in the Nam Ha National Protected Area, north-western Laos. It is still only known from its type locality. The specific name akhaorum refers to the local Akha people who helped with the fieldwork of the team who discovered the species.

== Description ==
Adult males measure 35–37 mm (1.4–1.5 in) in snout–vent length; females are unknown. The overall appearance is moderately slender with long head. The snout is obtusely pointed in dorsal view (projecting beyond lower jaw) and round in profile. The tympanum is distinct and round. The canthus rostralis is distinct. The fingers have large discs but no webbing. The toes have smaller discs and are heavily webbed. Skin is smooth but there are some large, raised, black tubercles on the dorsum. The dorsum is otherwise green. The side of head is black; there is a narrow gold stripe on canthus that start from the tip of snout and continues along margin of upper eyelid and above edge of the dorsolateral fold to the sacrum.

== Habitat and conservation ==
The type series was collected from evergreen hill forest at about 1,000 m (3,300 ft) above sea level. They were found perched on rocks, plant leaves, a mossy vine, or a fallen tree trunk above stream. All were males that were collected at night, and none of them was calling.

As of mid-2017, Amolops akhaorum has not been reported elsewhere than its type locality. Its conservation status has not been assessed by the International Union for Conservation of Nature (IUCN).
