= Bai Tu Long Bay =

National park in Vietnam

Coordinates: 21.0797°N 107.5665°E

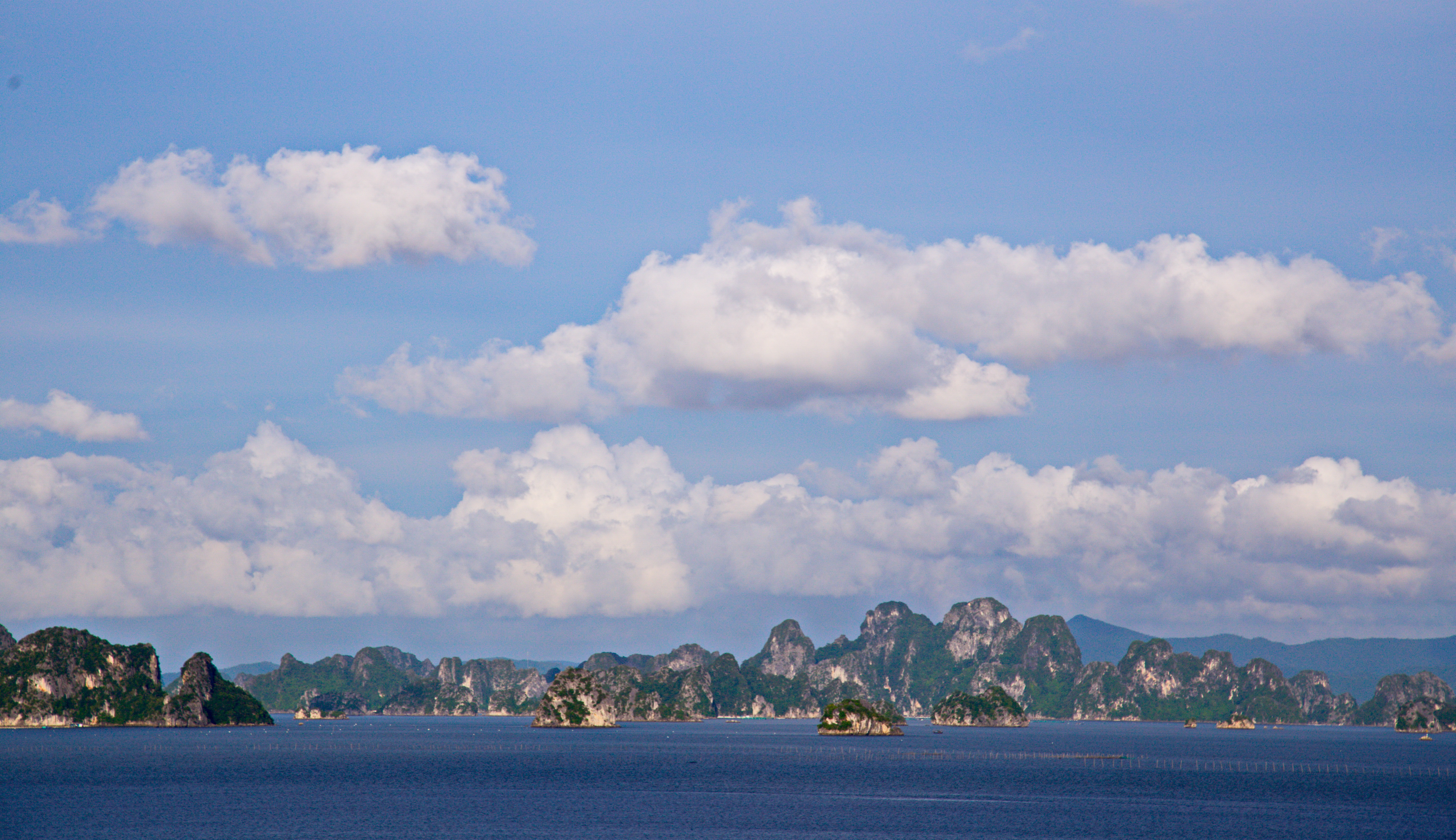

- Location within Vietnam
- Location: Quảng Ninh province
- Type: Bay
- Part of: Gulf of Tonkin
- Basin countries: VietNam

Bai Tu Long Bay is a bay in Vietnam. It encompasses Bái Tử Long National Park. Bai Tu Long Bay is northeast of Hạ Long Bay.
