= Bái Tử Long National Park =

National Park in Vân Đồn, Vietnam

- Vườn quốc gia Bái Tử Long
- IUCN category II (national park)
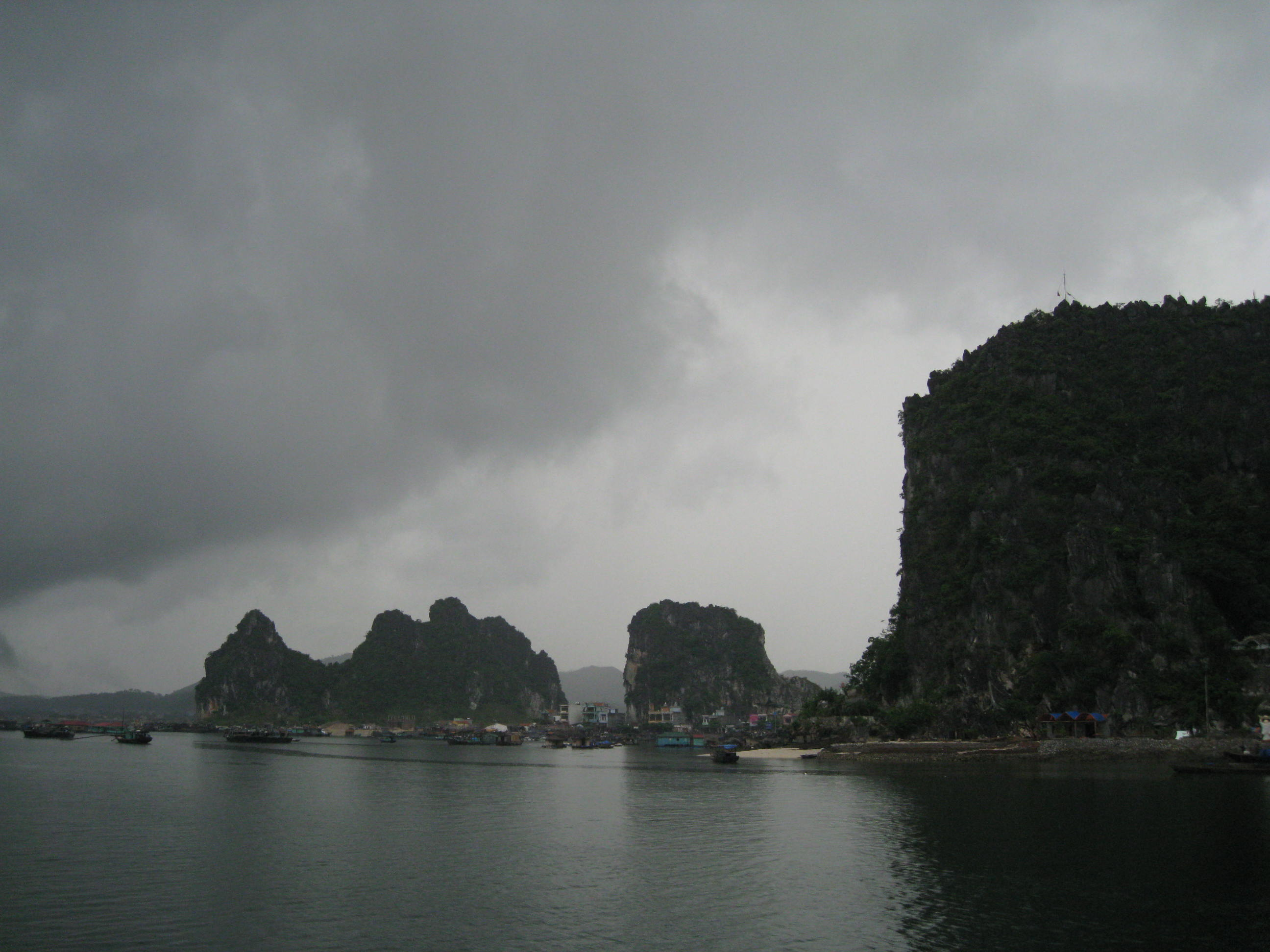
- Settlement within Bái Tử Long National Park

- Location within Vietnam
- Location: Vân Đồn, Quảng Ninh, Vietnam
- Nearest city: Cẩm Phả
- Coordinates: 21°6′0″N 107°38′0″E
- Area: 157.83 km^{2} (60.94 sq mi)
- Established: 1 June 2001

Bái Tử Long National Park (Vietnamese: Vườn quốc gia Bái Tử Long) is a national park in northern Vietnam. It is known for its biodiversity and landscape of islands and marine areas in Bái Tử Long Bay. The park covers an area of 157.83 km², including 61.25 km² of islands and 96.58 km² of marine waters, with a buffer zone of 165.34 km². It was established in 2001 and recognized as an ASEAN Heritage Park in 2016.

== History ==
The park was established on 1 June 2001 by Decision 85/2001/QĐ-TTg of the Prime Minister of Vietnam, based on the former Ba Mùn Nature Reserve. It is one of seven national parks in Vietnam that protect both terrestrial and marine environments. In 2016, it was designated as an ASEAN Heritage Park due to its ecological integrity, representativeness, naturalness, and conservation importance.

== Geography ==
The park is located in Vân Đồn, Quảng Ninh, encompassing parts of Bái Tử Long Bay. It includes about 40 islands and islets divided into three groups: Ba Mùn, Trà Ngọ, and Sậu. The park's core zone spans three communes: Minh Châu, Vạn Yên, and Hạ Long, while the buffer zone covers five communes including Bản Sen and Quan Lạn. Part of the park is within the UNESCO World Heritage Site of Hạ Long Bay.

== Tourism ==
The park offers tourism activities such as kayaking, hiking, cave exploration, and new routes launched in 2024 and 2025. Historical sites include temples from the Lý dynasty.
