= Nam Ha National Protected Area =

Nature reserve in Laos

- IUCN category VI (protected area with sustainable use of natural resources)
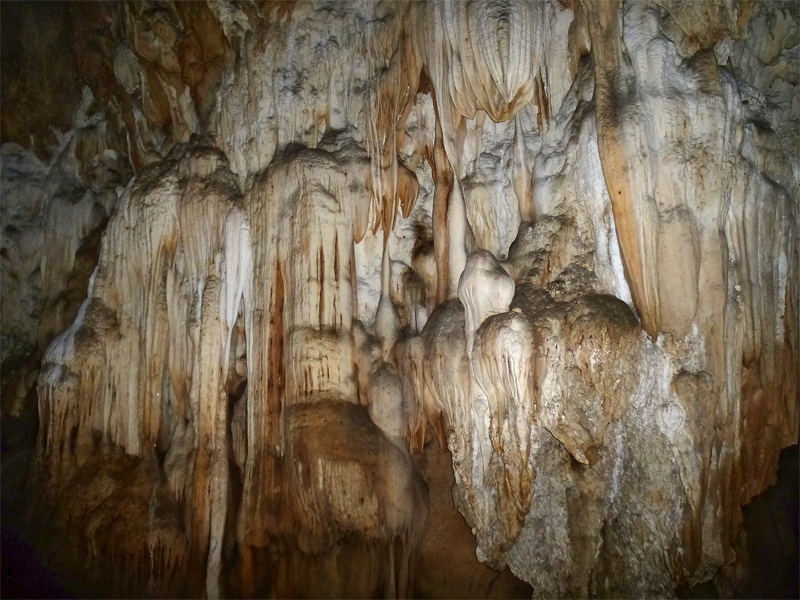
- Tham Khao Rao caves in Nam Ha NPA

- Location within Laos
- Location: Luang Namtha Province, Laos
- Nearest city: Luang Namtha
- Coordinates: 20°49′1″N 101°15′10″E
- Area: 2,224 km^{2} (860 sq mi)
- Designated: 29 October 1993
- Visitors: 6,500 (in 2008)
- Website: www.namha-npa.org/info/nam_ha_npa.htm

Nam Ha National Protected Area is a national protected area in Luang Namtha Province in northern Laos. This mostly forested park is home to a variety of ethnic groups and diverse animal and plant species. The park is an ecotourism destination.

== Geography ==
Nam Ha National Protected Area is located about 5 km (3 mi) southwest of Luang Namtha and covers parts of all five of the province's districts. The park's area is 2,224 km^{2} (860 sq mi). The park encompasses the Nam Ha Important Bird Area with an area of 1,845 km^{2} (710 sq mi).

Elevations range from about 500 m (1,640 ft) to the park's peak at 2,094 m (6,870 ft). The park incorporates three rivers which drain into the Mekong: the Nam Tha, Nam Fa and Nam Long. The Nam Tha is the Mekong's first major tributary after entering Laos.

== History ==
In 1980 Nam Ha was identified as a Provincial Protected Area. In 1993 Nam Ha National Protected Area was initially decreed to cover 697 km^{2} (270 sq mi). This was extended in 1999 to cover the present area of 2,224 km^{2} (860 sq mi). In 2003 Nam Ha was designated an ASEAN Heritage Park, the only one in Laos. In 2006 the Nam Ha Ecotourism Project (a joint UNESCO–Lao project to sustainably manage the park) won the Equator Prize.

== Flora and fauna ==
The park's main forest type is mixed secondary deciduous forest including secondary evergreen forest. At the park's lower elevations, in the Luang Namtha plain, human modification of the forest is evident and habitats include bamboo and scrub areas.

Animal species include Assam macaque, clouded leopard, gaur, tiger, elephant and a possibly unique species of muntjac. The frog species Amolops akhaorum is only known from the park. It is named for the local Akha people who helped with the fieldwork of the team who discovered the species in 2007.

The park is host to diverse bird species: about 300 species are recorded here. A few species are unique in Laos to Nam Ha: crested finchbill, white-bellied redstart and white-necked laughingthrush.

== Threats ==
Nam Ha faces a number of environmental threats. The most significant is slash-and-burn agriculture. Harvesting of forest products, including /% rubber plantations has occurred.

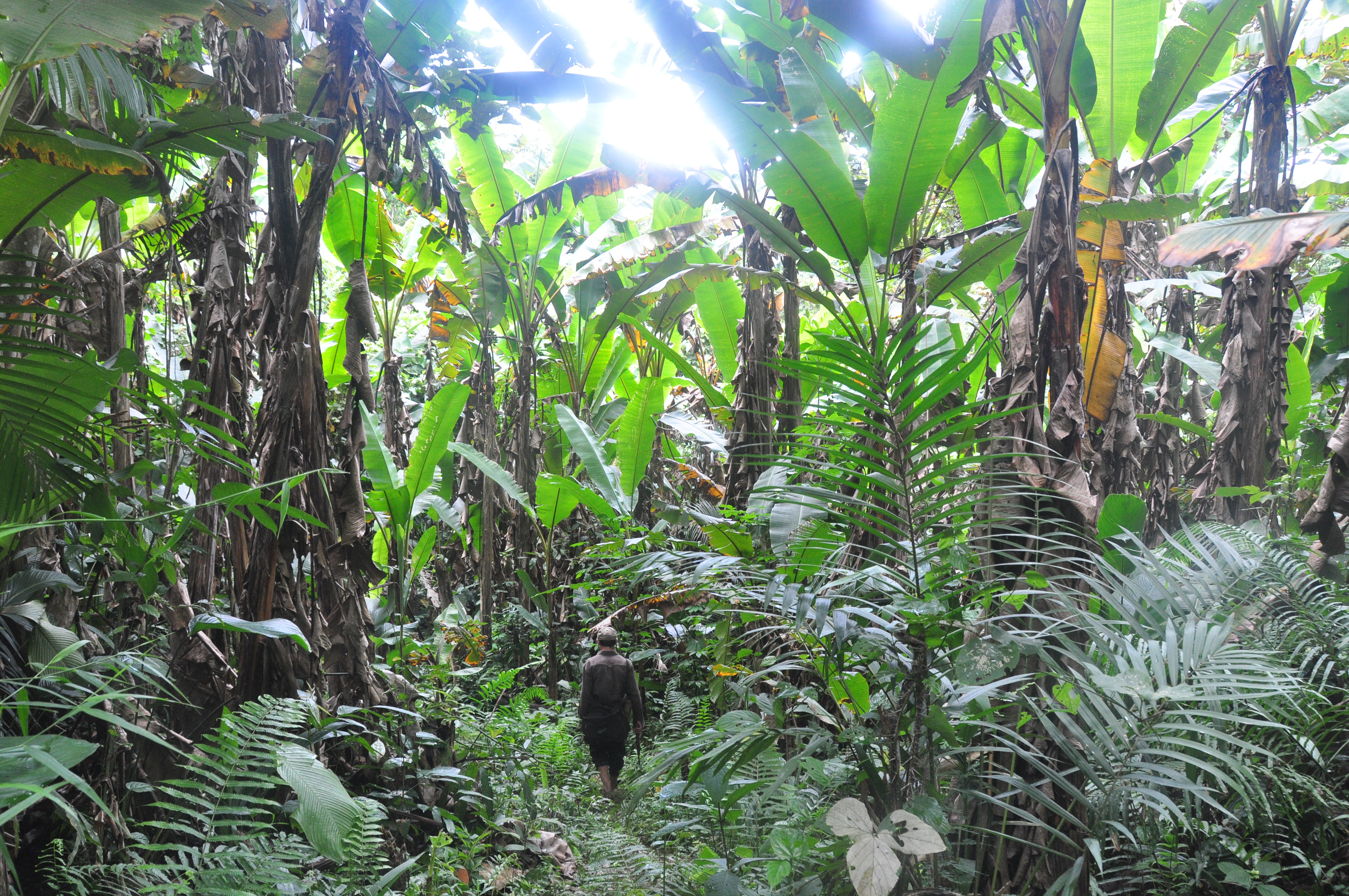
Park forest

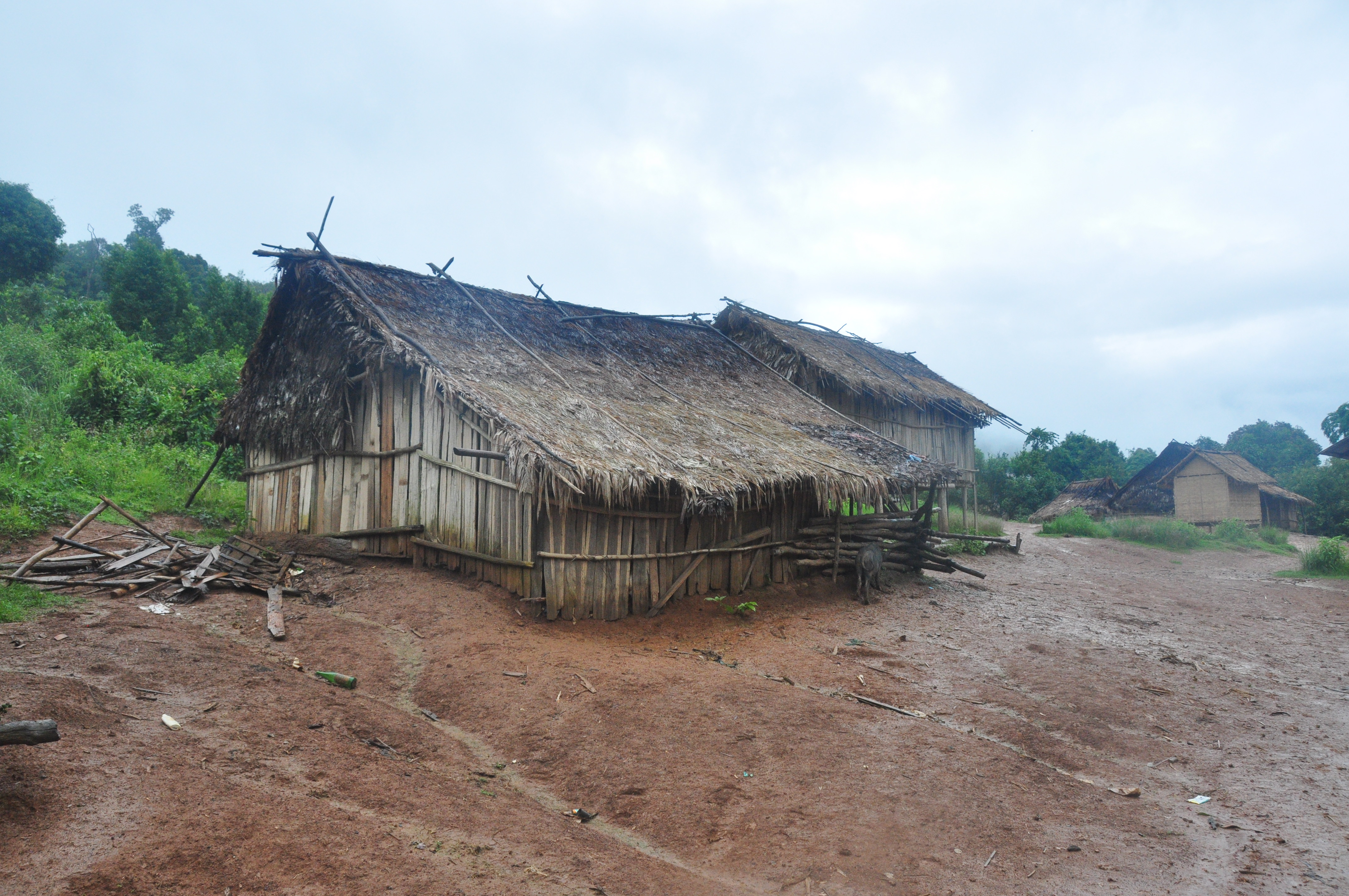
Village within NPA

== See also ==
- Protected areas of Laos
