= Xe Champhone Wetlands =

Wetlands in southern Laos

Designations

Ramsar Wetland
- Official name: Xe Champhone Wetlands
- Designated: 16 June 2010
- Reference no.: 1942

Xe Champhone Wetlands located in Savannakhet Province, in southern Laos and includes a large plain containing perennial and seasonal river channels, scattered lakes, ponds, permanent and seasonal freshwater marshes and rice paddy fields. Xe Champhone Wetlands was declared Ramsar Convention site in 2010.

== Geography ==
Xe Champhone Wetlands is located along the Xe Champhone River from below Ban Sakheun down to Ban Khoklo at Phia Cheo. North and south zones of the wetlands are divided by Ban Kengkok. The area of the wetlands covers 12,400 ha. The northern part of Xe Champhone includes rice paddy fields and two large reservoirs. The southern part contains extensive vegetation: open woodland, mixed semi-evergreen forest, shrubs and grasses.

=== Climate ===
There is a monsoonal zone with dry season from late October to early May and wet season from May to October in the wetlands. Temperatures range from an approximate low of 13 °C in January to a high of around 39 °C in April. Average annual rainfall at the site is around 1800 mm with up to a third of the rainfall recorded during August. Water level varies significantly between wet and dry seasons.

== Biodiversity ==
Some of the fauna which can be found in the Xe Champhone Wetlands includes: critically endangered Siamese crocodile, Asiatic softshell turtle, turtles, pythons, snipes, Indian spot-billed duck, waterhen, starling, kingfisher, herons and number of key fish species: mainly padouk (Clarias batrachus) pakho (Channa striata), patongnoy (Notopterus notopterus), pado (Channa spp.) etc. Wetlands are covered with mixed semi-evergreen and open woodland, bamboo and an understory of shrubs and grasses.
