= International rankings of Laos =

Organisation	Survey	Ranking
Institute for Economics and Peace	Global Peace Index	45 out of 144
The Heritage Foundation/The Wall Street Journal	Index of Economic Freedom	137 out of 157
Reporters Without Borders	Worldwide Press Freedom Index	164 out of 173
Transparency International	Corruption Perceptions Index	158 out of 180
United Nations Development Programme	Human Development Index	133 out of 179
World Intellectual Property Organization	Global Innovation Index, 2026	108 out of 139
