= Marshe =

Marshe may refer to:

- John Marshe, a Member of Parliament numerous times in the 16th century - see City of London (elections to the Parliament of England)
- Marshe Rockett (born 1985), American professional wrestler
- Surrey Marshe (born 1947), Playboy Playmate of the Month for January 1967
- Witham Marshe, the representative of the colony of Maryland at the negotiation of the Treaty of Lancaster in 1744
- Sheena Marshe, actress active from 1956–1968
