= Military history of Laos =

The Military history of Laos has been dominated by struggles against stronger neighbours, primarily Thailand and Vietnam, from at least the 18th century.

== Early history ==
Historically, Laos was subject to the will of its stronger neighbors, enforced by military means. By force of circumstances in warding off repeated foreign invasions, Laotians developed battle skills using elephants and compiled a history full of warlike deeds. Lan Xang, or the Kingdom of the Million Elephants, the first state in the recorded history of Laos, maintained a standing army of 150,000 men. Regiments included cavalry, infantry, and an elephant corps. Prince Fa Ngum, Lan Xang's founder, redeveloped the old Mongol model of an army composed of units of 10,000, which gave rise to the name of the succeeding reign, the Sam Sen Tai, or 300,000 Tai (ສາມແສນໄທ).

The army's strength enabled Fa Ngum to expand Lan Xang's borders to the western escarpment of the Khorat Plateau, the crest of the Annamite Chain in the east, and the northern edge of the Khmer and Cham civilizations in the south. To the north and east especially, however, mountain tribes resisted absorption and maintained a degree of independence.

Following Fa Ngum's death, struggles with Siamese and Burmese states in which his successors became embroiled, sapped the strength of the army and led to the decline and eventual splitting up of Lan Xang. In 1778 the capital of the Kingdom of Vientiane was attacked and destroyed for the first time by a Siamese army. By the 1820s, Laos had reestablished sovereignty over its own borders, enough that the king of Vientiane launched a disastrous military expedition against Siam in 1826 . Laotian forces were overwhelmed by the superior firepower and strategy of the Siamese army, which attacked and destroyed Vientiane for a second time in 1828.

== Colonial era ==
=== 1828 to 1900 ===
Following the destruction of Vientiane, Laotian affairs were dominated by Siam, although the Vietnamese also involved themselves from over the mountains. It was not until 1884, when France guaranteed Annam the integrity of its territorial domain, that Siamese hegemony over the eastern bank of the Mekong encountered a new challenge. Using Annam's claims to Laotian territories as a diplomatic pretext, France forced Siam to renounce all claims to territory east of the Mekong and even to islands in the river by successive treaties between 1893 and 1907.

To reinforce their security forces, which up to the twentieth century consisted largely of Vietnamese militia, the French formed local Laotian police and military constabulary units and provided them with some modern weapons, equipment, and rudimentary training. The Laotian units, whose salaries were paid for by the royal house of Louangphrabang (Luang Prabang), pledged allegiance to the monarchy, establishing a military tradition that ended only in 1975.

=== 1901 to 1940 ===
Between 1901 and 1907, France's colonial forces in Laos put down a group of southern mountain Mon-Khmer rebels, who were angry that France was suppressing their customary slave-trading activities. Bandits from China's Yunnan Province also kept the colonial army occupied in the north between 1914 and 1916. The army's final major action—from 1919 to 1921—was against the Hmong led by Pa Chay, who were conducting raids on the Lao, and other groups in Houaphan and Xiangkhoang provinces, with the aim of expelling the French and establishing an independent Hmong kingdom.

=== 1941 to 1946 ===
The first entirely Laotian military unit was formed by the French in 1941 and was known as the First Battalion of Chasseurs Laotiens (light infantry). It was used for internal security and did not see action until after the Japanese incursion of March 9, 1945, when Japan occupied Laos. The unit then went into the mountains, supplied and commanded by Free French agents, who had received special jungle training in camps in India and had parachuted into Laos beginning in December 1944 with the aim of creating a resistance network.

Meanwhile, taking advantage of the temporary absence of French authority in the towns, the Lao Issara government armed itself to defend the Laotian independence it had claimed on behalf of the people. For the most part, the effective components of the Lao Issara armed forces consisted of Vietnamese residents of the towns of Laos, who either had received weapons given them by the surrendering Japanese troops—sold by the Chinese Nationalist soldiers who occupied northern Laos under the 1945 Potsdam Conference agreements—or looted from French arsenals. In the Battle of Thakhek (Khammouan) in March 1946, which decided the issue of sovereignty in Laos in favor of the French, the Lao Issara used mortars and light machine guns against French armored vehicles and planes. One of the main preoccupations of the members of the Lao Issara government, exiled in Bangkok between 1946 and 1949, was to procure weapons to fight against the French.

=== 1946 to 1954 ===
French efforts to train and expand the Royal Lao Army continued during the First Indochina War (1946–54), by which time Laos had a standing army of 15,000 troops. The French knew that the lightly equipped Royal Lao Army was not in a position to defend Laos against Việt Minh regular forces formed by General Võ Nguyên Giáp. To counter Việt Minh invasions of Laos in 1953 and 1954, the French Union High Command diverted regular colonial units from the Democratic Republic of Vietnam into Laos; Giap exploited this weakness to disperse French Union forces. The French originally picked Dien Bien Phu as the site of a major strong point because it blocked a main invasion route into Laos, which they felt they had to defend at all cost in order to preserve their credibility with the king of Louangphrabang, who had sought France's protection. Some of the most effective fighters against the Việt Minh were Hmong from Xiangkhoang, whom the French had recruited and formed into guerrilla units; one of these units, under a sergeant named Vang Pao, was on the march to Dien Bien Phu when the garrison fell in May 1954.

Under the terms of the armistice signed at the Geneva Conference on Indochina on July 20, 1954, by the French Union High Command and the Việt Minh, all Việt Minh troops had to withdraw from Laos within 120 days. Laos was prohibited from having foreign military bases or personnel on its soil and from joining any military alliance. The agreements provided for the regrouping of Pathet Lao guerrillas in the provinces of Houaphan and Phôngsali and their integration into the Royal Lao Army. The Pathet Lao, however, taking advantage of their easy access across the border to North Vietnam, immediately began to expand their guerrilla army, the first unit of which, the Latsavong detachment, had been formed in 1949 by Kaysone Phomvihane.

== Royal Lao Army ==
=== 1954 to 1961 ===
With the ending of the war, Laos was no longer a part of the French Union, but had instead become an entirely sovereign nation. The country was subsequently divided into five military regions and the chain of command of the Royal Lao Army was placed under the Ministry of Defense in Vientiane.

To meet the threat represented by the Pathet Lao, the Royal Lao Army depended on a small French military training mission led by a general officer—an exceptional arrangement permitted under the Geneva agreement. Laos' military organization and tactical training reflected the French military tradition. Most of the equipment possessed by the Lao military was of United States (US) origin, because the US had been supplying the French during the early phase of the First Indochina War. Matériel support ranged from guns to aircraft. In the post-war period, a small US legation remained in Vientiane and informed Washington about the status of the Royal Lao Army. The Americans became seriously concerned over the capacity of the Laotians to maintain their equipment, with the majority of items being subject to damage from the tropical sun and rain. As France was no longer responsible for Laos' finances, further concern emerged over payment of the Royal Lao Army salaries.

It seemed evident to the US legation that only United States personnel in Laos could ensure that the Royal Lao Army was capable of meeting the threat posed by the North Vietnam-backed Pathet Lao. In December 1955, as a means of circumventing the prohibition against foreign military personnel imposed by the 1954 Geneva agreement—which the US had pledged to honor—the United States Department of Defense established a disguised military mission in Laos, called the Programs Evaluation Office (PEO). The PEO worked under cover of a civilian aid mission. It was staffed by military personnel and a general officer, who wore civilian clothes was in command. During the 1955–61 period, the PEO gradually supplanted the French military mission's role as the provider of equipment and training to the Royal Lao Army. With increasing numbers of Laotian officers receiving training in Thailand, and at staff schools in the US, a perception that the French military mission in Laos was a relic of colonialism surfaced. By 1959, the PEO had more than 100 staff members and the US was paying the entire cost of the Royal Lao Army's salaries.

A treaty prohibiting Laos from joining any military alliance prevented the nation from joining the Southeast Asia Treaty Organization (SEATO) that was formed by Australia, Britain, France, New Zealand, Pakistan, the Philippines, Thailand and the United States in September 1954. However, a protocol to the treaty designated Laos as a country for which mutual security provisions would apply in the event that it became the victim of aggression. Furthermore, with the unsuccessful integration of two Pathet Lao battalions into the Royal Lao Army, Laos faced an increased chance of attack from North Vietnamese forces. When fighting consequently broke out with North Vietnam along the Lao border between July and September 1959, the Royal Lao Government (RLG) wanted to appeal to SEATO for help. However, the RLG was dissuaded from seeking support by the US, due to the latter's fear that such an appeal could lead to the engagement of US combat troops in Laos. Also, guerrillas belonged to ethnic tribes that lived on both sides of the border, which made the question of aggression ambiguous. In January 1961, the Lao Government was again dissuaded by the US from seeking SEATO assistance, but on this occasion Kong Le was also involved in the aggression.

Kong Le's coup d'état on August 9, 1960, threatened to split the army between Kong Le's Lao Neutralist Revolutionary Organization (known as the Neutralists or the Neutralists Armed Forces) and the leadership of General Phoumi Nosavan, the former Lao minister of defense. PEO headquarters in Vientiane had become inactive, as US diplomats were instructed to find a way to isolate Nosavan and aid was eventually cut off. Meanwhile, the PEO branch office in Savannakhet, Phoumi's headquarters, continued to supply and pay Phoumi's troops. Following Phoumi's capture of Vientiane, the Neutralists were compelled, for survival, to enter into an alliance with the Pathet Lao and their North Vietnamese backers; an alliance that would thereafter provide Kong Le's organization with supplies.

=== 1961 to 1968 ===
In April 1961, the PEO was upgraded to a Military Assistance Advisory Group (MAAG), and its members were allowed to wear uniforms. The MAAG was withdrawn in 1962 under the terms of the Geneva Agreement, which was supposed to neutralize Laos. Because the North Vietnamese did not respect the withdrawal requirement, the United States stepped up military aid to the Lao Government, but avoided sending ground troops into Laos, which would have violated the agreement.

As part of this effort, United States Central Intelligence Agency (CIA) personnel operating from a base at Udon Thani, Thailand, took over the support of between 30,000 and 36,000 irregulars, including Hmong guerrillas who bore the brunt of the fighting in northern Laos. A CIA-chartered airline, Air America, dropped rice and ammunition from its C-46s and C-47s to isolated Hmong outposts, which were sometimes behind enemy lines. A variety of short takeoff and landing aircraft used dirt airstrips carved out of the jungle by the Hmong. The irregulars, who became known as the Secret Army, were instrumental in helping to rescue a large number of United States airmen who were shot down over Laos. By this time, Hmong leader Vang Pao had risen to the rank of general in the Royal Lao Army and commanded the Second Military Region.

In October 1964, in response to an offensive by the Pathet Lao and North Vietnamese to expel the Neutralists from the Plain of Jars, the United States began providing air support against Pathet Lao positions and North Vietnamese supply lines. However, it was not until March 1966 at Phoukout, northwest of the Plain of Jars, that the Pathet Lao started to win major battles against the Royal Lao Army. In July 1966, the Pathet Lao won another major battle in the Nambak Valley in northern Louangphrabang Province by overrunning a Royal Lao Army base and inflicting heavy casualties. These victories gave the Pathet Lao new momentum in the war for control of Laos.

Meanwhile, in southern Laos, where the North Vietnamese had been working steadily every dry season to expand the Ho Chi Minh Trail leading into South Vietnam, the intensity of the air war also grew. The air war in Laos operated under a complicated command and control system that involved the United States embassy in Vientiane, the Military Assistance Command Vietnam in Saigon, Royal Thai air bases in Thailand, the commander in chief Pacific in Honolulu, and sometimes even the White House. The United States ambassador in Vientiane had the final say on target selection, using criteria that included: the distance of targets from civilian habitations and the types of ordnance to be expended. The ambassador also was to keep the Lao Government informed so as to avoid, or at least minimize, the latter's embarrassment vis-à-vis the British and Soviet embassies in Vientiane and the heads of the Indian, Canadian, and Polish delegations to the International Control Commission who were jointly responsible for enforcing the 1962 Declaration on the Neutrality of Laos signed in Geneva.

=== 1969 to 1973 ===
During the June 1969 rainy season, the Pathet Lao and two North Vietnamese battalions, using Soviet tanks, pushed the Royal Lao Army and the Neutralists out of their base at Muang Sua northwest of the Plain of Jars. Fighting continued during the monsoon season. In September 1969, Vang Pao's Hmong, supported by United States bombing, launched a series of surprise attacks against key points on the Plain of Jars. A new North Vietnamese army division joined the battle shortly thereafter and by February, 1970, had regained all of the devastated plain.

In 1970, despite eight years of ground offensives by the Royal Lao Army and massive United States air support, the Pathet Lao had grown into an army of 48,000 troops and was prepared to challenge Royal Lao Army forces on their own territory by mounting large offensives in the south, engaging an even greater number of North Vietnamese forces. The introduction of Soviet-made long-range 130mm artillery pieces onto the battlefield, in that year, allowed the Pathet Lao and North Vietnamese to neutralize to some extent the Royal Lao Army's advantage of air superiority.

In 1970 the combat elements of the Royal Lao Army were organized into fifty-eight infantry battalions and one artillery regiment of four battalions. The largest tactical unit was the battalion, which was composed of a headquarters, a headquarters company, and three rifle companies. Royal Lao Army units were devoted primarily to static defense and were stationed near population centers, lines of communication, depots, and airfields. These units were complemented by military police and armored, engineer, and communications units. Between 1962 and 1971, the United States provided Laos with an estimated US$500 million in military assistance, not including the cost of equipping and training irregular and paramilitary forces. During the 1971–75 period, it added about seventy-five T-28 light-strike or training aircraft, about twenty C-47s in both transport and gunship configurations, fewer than ten H-34 helicopters, and some small U-1 and U-17 aircraft.

In February 1971, a major offensive by the South Vietnamese army, with United States logistical and air support, sent two divisions into Laos in the vicinity of Xépôn, with the objective of cutting North Vietnamese supply lines. However, once inside Laos, South Vietnamese commanders were separated from their resupply bases by long logistics lines, resulting in an early termination of the offensive. By December 1971, the Pathet Lao had taken Paksong on the Bolaven Plateau and had invested the main Hmong base at Longtiang. Communist advances continued into 1972 and encircled Thakhek on the Mekong, and Vientiane.

The cease-fire of February 22, 1973, ended bombing by the United States and temporarily halted ground offensives. The Pathet Lao, however, following their usual practice, used the cessation of military operations to resupply their forces over the long and exposed roads from North Vietnam. In further fighting in the spring of 1975, the Pathet Lao finally broke the resistance of Vang Pao's Hmong blocking the road junction linking Vientiane, Louangphrabang, and the Plain of Jars. Watched by two battalions of Pathet Lao troops, which had been flown into Vientiane and Louangphrabang on Soviet and Chinese planes to neutralize those towns under the cease-fire agreement, the communists organized demonstrations to support their political and military demands, leading to the final, bloodless seizure of power in the towns that the RLG had held until then.
