= Nam Phouy National Biodiversity Conservation Area =

Protected area in Laos

Nam Poui National Biodiversity Conservation Area
- Nam Phoi National Protected Area
- IUCN category VI (protected area with sustainable use of natural resources)
- Interactive map of Nam Poui National Biodiversity Conservation Area
- Area: 1,912.0 km^{2} (738.2 sq mi)
- Designation: National
- Designated: 1993
- Governing body: Ministry of Agriculture and Forestry (MAF)

Nam Poui National Biodiversity Conservation Area is a protected area in the Sayaboury Province of the Lao P.D.R. It is named after Nam Poui village, also known as "Muang Pieng" and is one of the 21 National Biodiversity Conservation Areas (NBCA) established by the Lao government. The NBCA is located in the forested mountains of the Luang Prabang Range and shares a border with Thailand and three other national parks. It is part of the Luang Prabang montane rain forests ecoregion.

Nam Poui NBCA is home to 50 - 60 Asian elephants, the largest wild population left in Laos. The reservoir area of the lower Nam Poun river is partly within the Nam Poui NBCA border.

The area, covering nearly 2000 square kilometers is currently patrolled by 12 persons. With such little support trying to maintain conservation efforts is difficult. It is because of this that the elephant and wildlife monitoring in Nam Poui NBCA needs to be strengthened.

== See also ==
- Protected areas of Laos
