= Xe Pian National Park =

National park in southern Laos

- IUCN category VI (protected area with sustainable use of natural resources)
- Location within Laos
- Location: Champasak and Attapeu provinces, Laos
- Nearest city: Pakse
- Coordinates: 14°33′40″N 106°3′46″E
- Area: 2,400 km^{2} (930 sq mi) (decreed), 2,665–3,418 km^{2} (1,030–1,320 sq mi) (later measurements/estimates)
- Designated: 1993 national protected area, 2021 national park

Xe Pian National Park is a national park in Champasak and Attapeu provinces in southern Laos. This forested, hilly park is home to significant wetlands and a great diversity of animal, bird and fish species. It is an ecotourism destination.

== Geography ==
Xe Pian National Park is about 50 kilometres (30 mi) south of Pakse in Pathoumphone and Khong districts of Champasak and Sanamxay District of Attapeu. A large part of the park's boundary follows the border with Cambodia. The park's decreed area is 2,400 square kilometres (930 sq mi) but there have been recent higher estimates of size.

Elevations range from 150 metres (500 ft) to the park's highest point at 844 metres (2,770 ft). Three significant rivers have portions in the park: Xe Pian, which joins the Xe Kong, and Xe Khampho.

== Flora and fauna ==
The park's main forest type is mixed evergreen covering about 80% of its area. Deciduous forest constitutes a further 17% of the park.

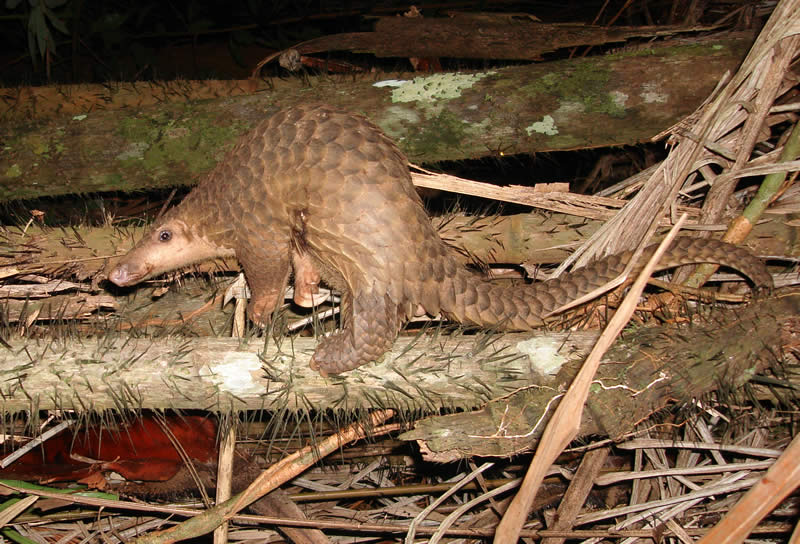
Sunda pangolin

Threatened animal species include elephant, tiger, yellow-cheeked gibbon, gaur, dhole, Asian black bear, sun bear, banteng and the critically endangered Sunda pangolin. Reptiles include Siamese crocodile and Cantor's giant softshell turtle, both endangered.

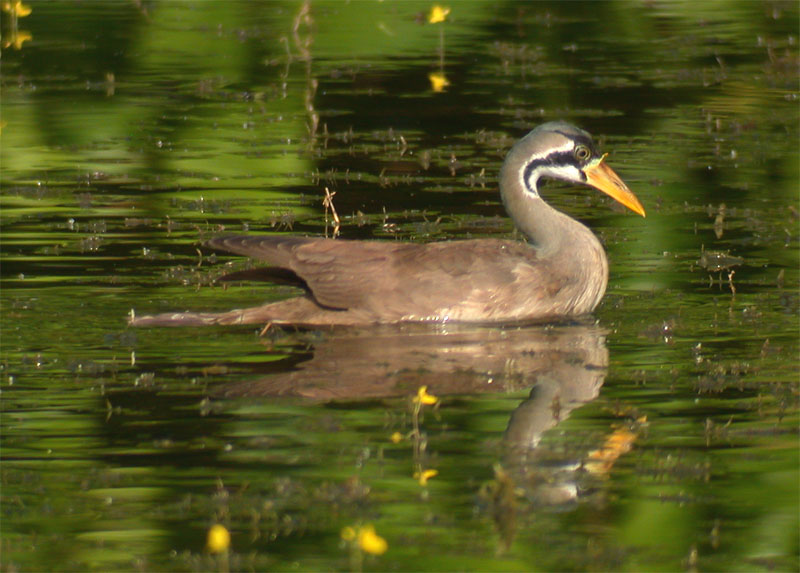
Masked finfoot

A part of the Xe Khampho–Xe Pian Important Bird Area (IBA) overlaps the park. 750 square kilometres (290 sq mi) of the IBA's approximate area of 2,000 square kilometres (770 sq mi) lies in Xe Pian. Bird species of important conservation status in the common IBA and park area include white-winged duck, masked finfoot and white-rumped vulture. Elsewhere in the park important species include giant ibis, sarus crane, red-headed vulture, woolly-necked stork and green peafowl.

== Threats ==
Xe Pian faces a number of environmental threats. A fertiliser plant and a hydropower project have been constructed in the park. There is hunting and poaching of animals for international trade and local consumption. Agricultural activity is taking place in ecologically sensitive areas including park wetlands. Since 2015 an additional threat is the Golden Apple Snails eating the rice and grass (the elephants feed on). The locals collect and boil these now to sell at the markets but the sheer numbers are a growing problem.

== See also ==
- Protected areas of Laos
