= Wildlife of Laos =

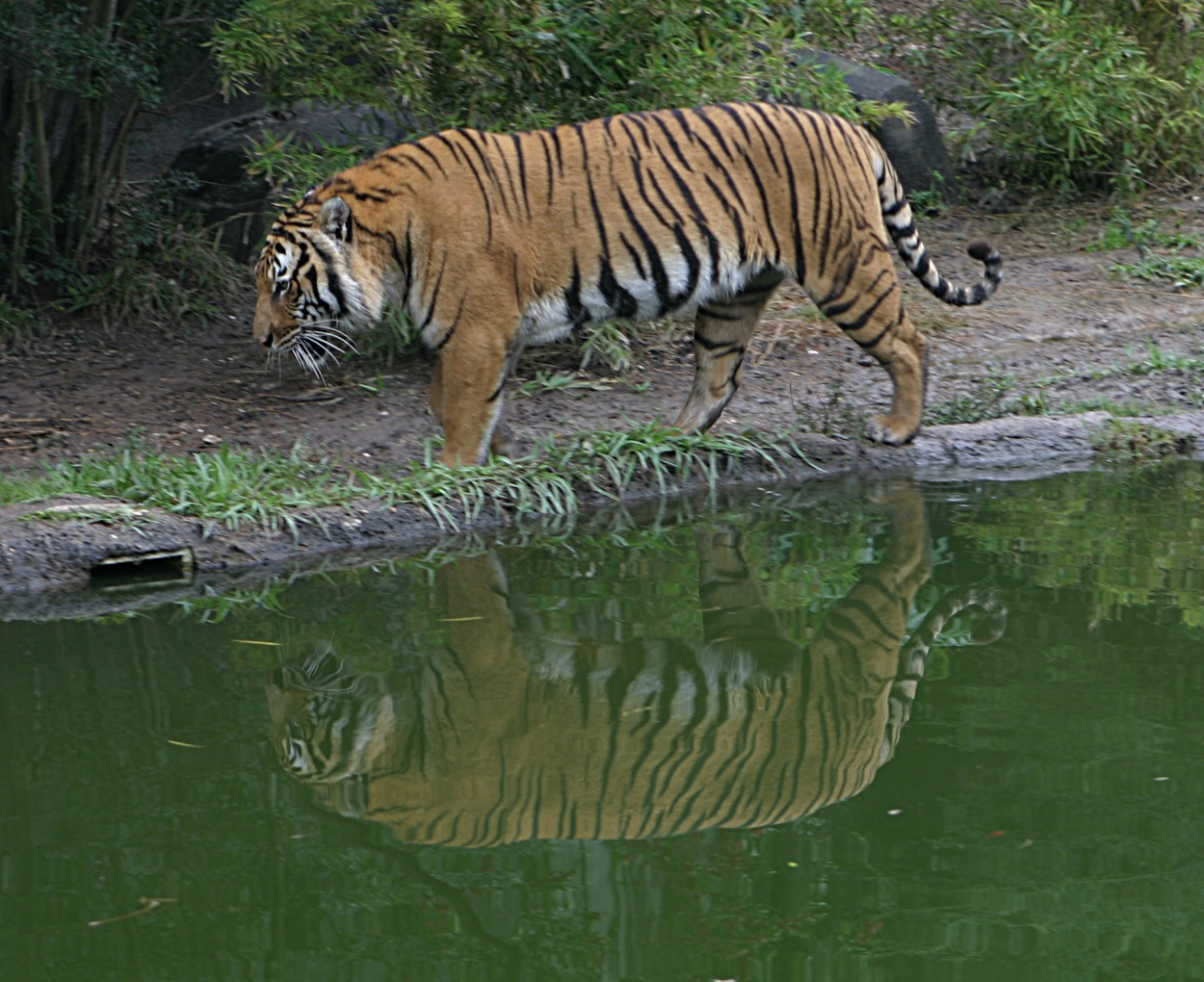
An Indochinese tiger.

The wildlife of Laos encompasses the animals and plants found in the Lao People's Democratic Republic, a landlocked country in southeastern Asia. Part of the country is mountainous and much of it is still clad in tropical broadleaf forest. It has a great variety of animal and plant species.

== Geography ==
Laos is a land-locked country located in southeastern Asia. The northern part is mountainous, with the Luang Prabang Range separating the northwestern part of the country from Thailand. The Xiangkhoang Plateau separates these mountains from the Annamite Range, a chain of mountains which run parallel with the Vietnamese coast, and mark the easternmost boundary of the country. The west of the country is mostly bounded by the broad Mekong River, and the south is the Bolaven Plateau at some 1,000 to 1,350 metres (3,280 to 4,430 ft) above sea level. Laos lies in the monsoon belt and experiences a rainy seasons between May and November when much rain falls, and a dry season without rain from December to April. This results in a natural forest cover of deciduous, broadleaf trees, that lose their leaves during the dry season. There is a distinct rainy season from May to November, followed by a dry season from December to the middle of April.

== Habitat ==
Much of Laos is still covered by natural forest and six different species of gibbon are found here, all of which are threatened by being hunted for food and by reduction in forest cover.

The Annamite Range has a high level of endemism and is home to the critically endangered saola (Pseudoryx nghetinhensis), the Annamite striped rabbit (Nesolagus timminsi) and the Truong Son muntjac (Muntiacus truongsonensis), all of which have only been discovered in the last two decades.

In the south of the country, mostly within about 50 km (30 mi) of the Mekong River, there are wetlands and swamp forests. These include lakes and ponds, some permanent and some temporary, swamps, and seasonally-flooded grasslands, and these and the surrounding woodlands support a biodiverse community.

== Flora ==
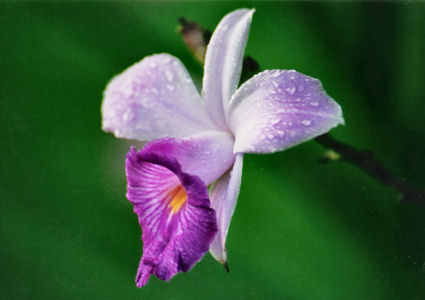
Bamboo orchid

Much of Laos still retains its natural tropical and subtropical dry broadleaf forests, and some areas consist of secondary forests growing where timber has been extracted from the primary forest. In general, the upper parts of the canopy are dominated by the cauliflower-like crowns of tall dipterocarps with trunks devoid of branches. The middle levels consist of other hardwood trees including teak, mahogany, Heritiera javanica, Tetrameles nudiflora, Ficus and Pterocarpus. The understorey consists of smaller trees, bamboos, shrubs and grasses. Near the streams are bamboo thickets; Laos is rich with species of bamboo, and where timber has been extracted from primary forest, bamboos tend to dominate in the new-growth secondary forest. In wetter, upland regions of northern Laos, Fujian cypress is dominant, and supports a dense ground cover of mosses and ferns.

There is tropical rainforest in the Annamite Mountains because the rainfall is higher and more evenly distributed throughout the year. The dominant species here are Elaeocarpus, Podocarpus, oaks, magnolias, camellias and laurels, and many of these are endemic to this mountain range. In the higher parts of the range there are forests of pine, and the mists that often envelope these cloud forests encourage the growth of lush mosses and ferns on the deep leaf litter, and epiphytes on the branches.

In the south of the country, there are tropical pine forests, and on the southern plateau are more open deciduous forests with less-dense, middle-level growth and more shrubs, herbs and grasses below.

The bamboo orchid grows here, and the Vietnamese white pine is an uncommon tree that can be seen in the Nakai–Nam Theun conservation area in central Laos. It is one of about 16 species of conifer present in the country.

== Fauna ==
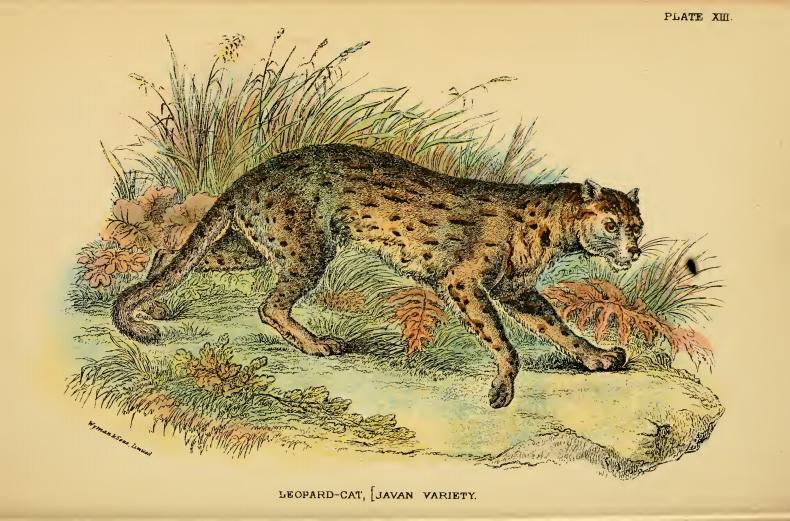
Leopard cat

There are a number of large mammals in Laos, including the Asian elephant (Elephas maximus) and Indochinese tiger (Panthera tigris corbetti). There are two species of bear, the sun bear (Helarctos malayanus) and Asian black bear (Ursus thibetanus). Smaller carnivorans include the leopard cat (Prionailurus bengalensis), marbled cat (Pardofelis marmorata) and hog badger (Arctonyx collaris).

Ungulates include the pot-bellied pig (Sus scrofa domestica), Javan rhinoceros (Rhinoceros sondaicus), banteng (Bos javanicus), kouprey (Bos sauveli), saola (Pseudoryx nghetinhensis), Indian muntjac (Muntiacus muntjak), giant muntjac (Muntiacus vuquangensis) and Truong Son muntjac (Muntiacus truongsonensis). There are many rodents, including the ricefield rat (Rattus argentiventer) and the recently discovered Pauline's limestone rat (Saxatilomys paulinae), Laotian giant flying squirrel (Biswamoyopterus laoensis) and Laotian rock rat (Laonastes aenigmamus), the latter being a Lazarus taxon. The lesser false vampire bat (Megaderma spasma) is found in Laos, and endemic species of bat include the Phou Khao Khouay leaf-nosed bat (Hipposideros khaokhouayensis). The long-eared gymnure (Hylomys megalotis) is another mammal endemic to Laos.

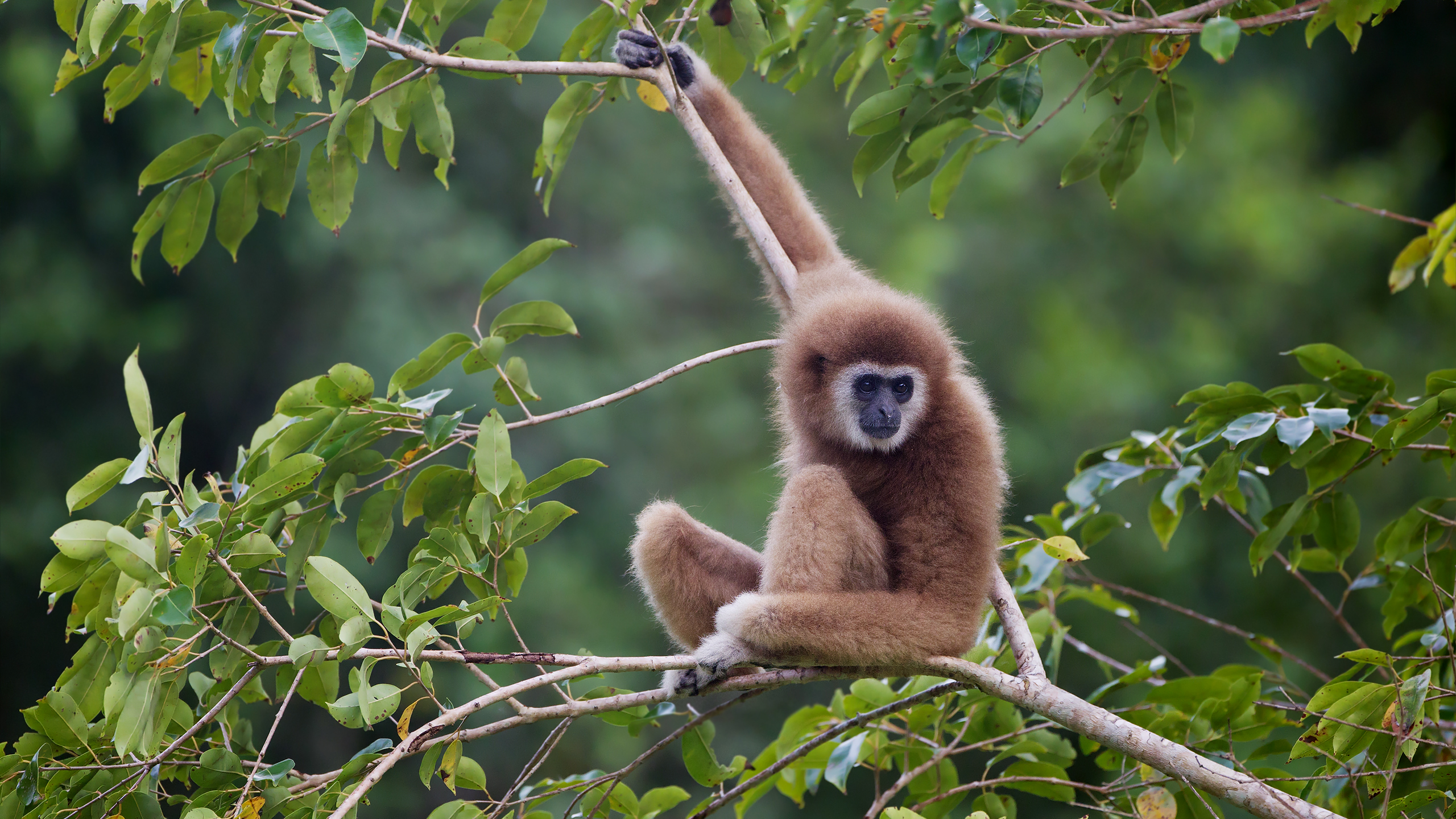
Lar gibbon

Primates present in Laos include the hatinh langur (Trachypithecus hatinhensis), silvery lutung (Trachypithecus cristatus) and red-shanked douc (Pygathrix nemaeus), as well as seven species of gibbon; the lar gibbon (Hylobates lar), pileated gibbon (Hylobates pileatus), northern buffed-cheeked gibbon (Nomascus annamensis), black crested gibbon (Nomascus concolor), yellow-cheeked gibbon (Nomascus gabriellae), northern white-cheeked gibbon (Nomascus leucogenys) and southern white-cheeked gibbon (Nomascus siki).

Snakes present in Laos include the reticulated python (Python reticulatus) and the pit vipers Deinagkistrodon (D. acutus), Chinese mountain pit viper (Ovophis monticola), Jerdon's pit viper (Protobothrops jerdonii), three-horned scaled pit viper (Protobothrops sieversorum), Chinese green tree viper (Trimeresurus stejnegeri) and brown-spotted pit viper (Protobothrops mucrosquamatus).

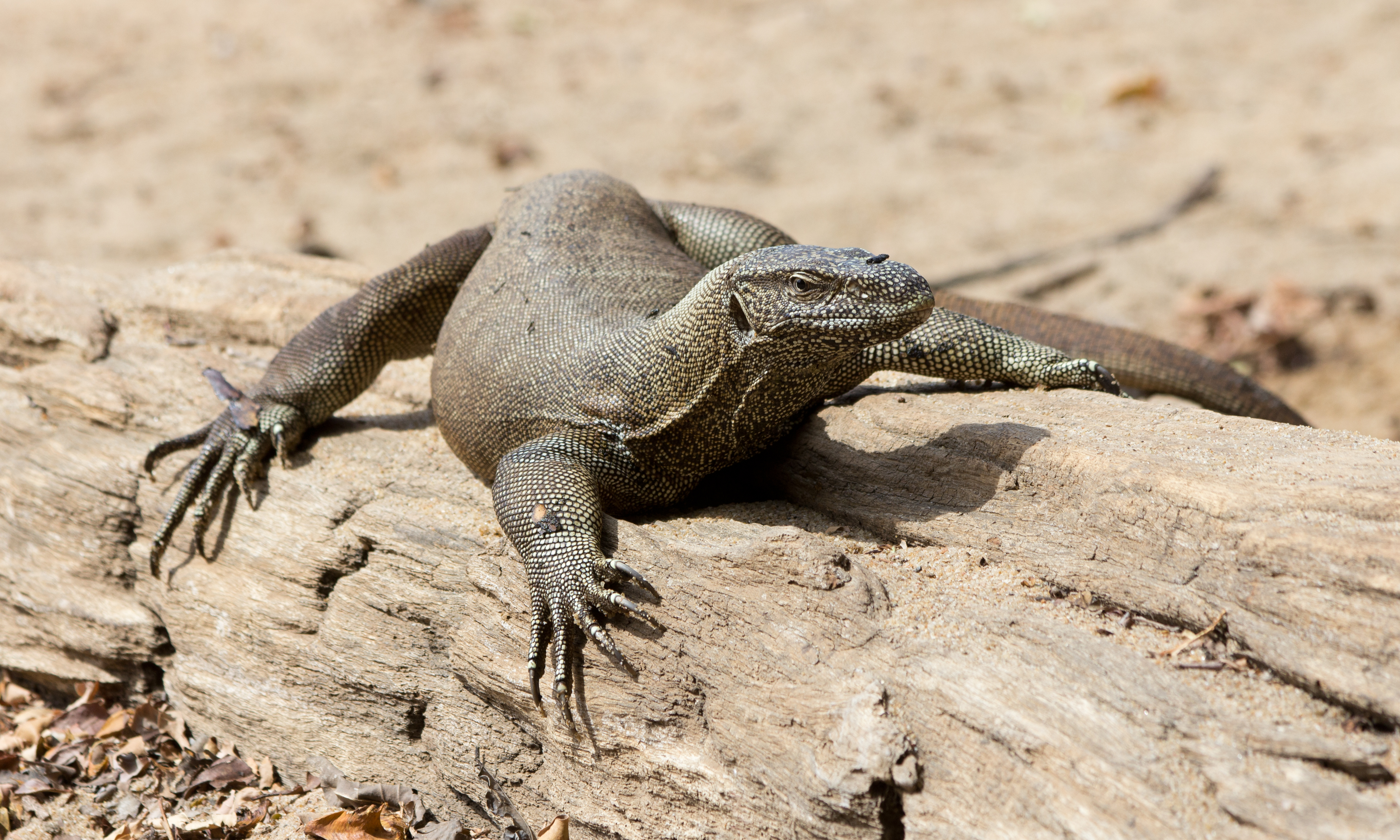
Bengal monitor

Other reptiles include two monitor lizards, the Bengal monitor (Varanus bengalensis) and Asian water monitor (Varanus salvator). The Siamese crocodile (Crocodylus siamensis) is found in the rivers and swamps and is critically endangered. The elongated tortoise (Indotestudo elongata) is found in Laos, as well as two species of turtle, the Amboina box turtle (Cuora amboinensis) and Cantor's giant softshell turtle (Pelochelys cantorii).

Amphibians are plentiful in Laos, with some only recently being discovered, including many frogs and the Upper Laos caecilian (Ichthyophis laosensis), Laos warty newt (Paramesotriton laoensis) and Laos knobby newt (Tylototriton notialis).

The Mekong giant catfish (Pangasianodon gigas) is a critically endangered species of fish found in the Mekong River. A number of loaches and guppies are endemic to the country, as are Poropuntius bolovenensis, Tor ater, Acrossocheilus xamensis, Speolabeo musaei and Troglocyclocheilus khammouanensis.

About 740 species of bird have been recorded in Laos. The only known endemic species is the bare-faced bulbul (Pycnonotus hualon). Globally endangered species that occur in the country include the white-winged duck (Cairina scutulata), green peafowl (Pavo muticus), greater adjutant (Leptoptilos dubius), white-shouldered ibis (Pseudibis davisoni), giant ibis (Pseudibis gigantea), masked finfoot (Heliopais personatus), Nordmann's greenshank (Tringa guttifer), black-bellied tern (Sterna acuticauda), collared laughingthrush (Trochalopteron yersini) and yellow-breasted bunting (Emberiza aureola), as well as four species of vulture; the red-headed vulture (Sarcogyps calvus), white-rumped vulture (Gyps bengalensis), Indian vulture (Gyps indicus) and slender-billed vulture (Gyps tenuirostris).

== Conservation ==
Laos ratified The Convention on International Trade in Endangered Species of Wild Fauna and Flora in 2004 and this means that theoretically, the wildlife is protected. However, in practice, the treaty is poorly enforced. At markets, particularly near the borders, endangered species can be observed on sale with gibbons being sold as pets to Thailand, and bushmeat, trophies (horns) and medicines being sold to Vietnam. Besides this, many birds and animals are hunted for food, so much so that wild birds are scarce in populated areas.

A 2020 study of wildlife consumption in northern Laos by San Diego Zoo Global researchers found widespread use of body parts from sun bears, Asiatic bears, and serows, goat-like mammals, among other vulnerable species. The most sought-after items, consumed by about a quarter of those interviewed, were derived from the bile or gallbladder of sun bears and Asiatic bears. Researchers interviewed 100 adults in 18 villages in Luang Prabang Province. Use of bear products in the region had been documented previously, but this study indicates that consumption is greater than previously thought. The second most-consumed items, used by seven percent of respondents, were derived from serows. Products derived from serows and bears are similar in form and use, often being made into topicals or consumables to treat bruises or fight fatigue. All three species are listed at Threatened.

Other species listed as endangered include tigers, Asian elephants, banteng, black gibbon, douc monkey, hoolock gibbon, particolored flying squirrel, and red pandas. Several critically endangered species, notably the Javan and Sumatran rhinoceros and the kouprey also exist in the country. Conservation efforts have increased in recent decades, with the official establishment of the World Wildlife Fund in Laos in 2001, and local efforts including the Lao Conservation Trust for Wildlife. In 2026, Laos implemented the National Tiger Recovery Action Plan (NTRAP) for 2026–2035, increasing conservation efforts for wild tigers found in multiple regions in the country. For elephants, specific organisations such as the Elephant Conservation Center (ECC) in Sayaboury offers a sanctuary for elephants aiming to promote their conservation and development before release into natural parks.

== See also ==
- Deforestation in Laos
