= Geography of Laos =

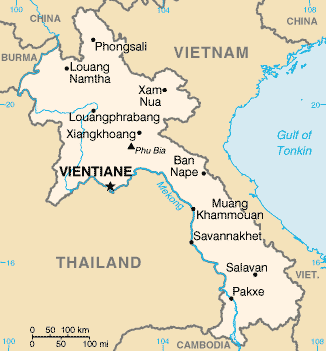

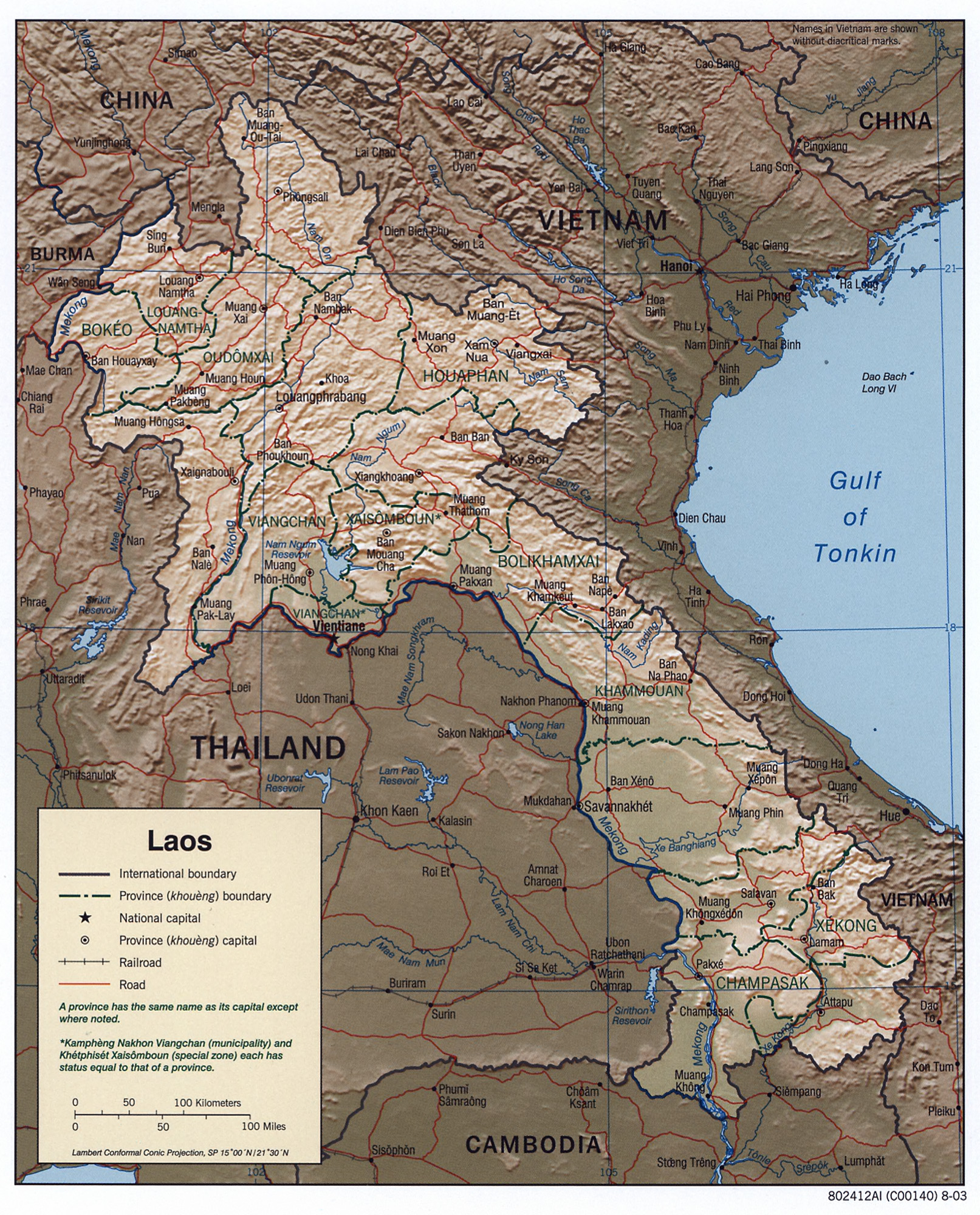

Laos is a landlocked country in mainland Southeast Asia. It covers approximately 236,800 square kilometers and is surrounded by Myanmar, Cambodia, China, Thailand, and Vietnam.

About 70% of its geographic area is made up of mountain ranges, highlands, plateaus, and rivers cut through.

== Topography ==
Most of the western border of Laos is demarcated by the Mekong river, which is an artery for transportation. The Dong Falls at the southern end of the country prevent access to the sea, and cargo boats travel along the entire length of the Mekong in Laos during most of the year. Smaller power boats and pirogues provide an important means of transportation on many of the tributaries of the Mekong.

Prior to the twentieth century, kingdoms and principalities encompassed areas on both sides of the Mekong, and Thai control in the nineteenth century extended to the left bank. While the Mekong was established as a border by French colonial forces, travel from 1 side to the other has been more limited since the establishment of the Lao People's Democratic Republic (LPDR, or Laos) in 1975.

The eastern border with Vietnam extends for 2,130 kilometres, mostly along the crest of the Annamite Chain, and serves as a physical barrier between the Chinese-influenced culture of Vietnam and the Indianized states of Laos and Thailand. These mountains are populated by tribal minorities who traditionally have not acknowledged the border with Vietnam any more than lowland Lao have been constrained by the 1,754-kilometre Mekong River border with Thailand. Thus, ethnic minority populations are found on both the Laotian and Vietnamese sides of the frontier. Because of their "relative isolation", contact between these groups and lowland Lao has been mostly confined to trading.

Laos shares a 541 kilometres—southern border with Cambodia, and Khmer ruins at Wat Pho and other southern locations attest to the history of contact between the Lao and the Khmer. In the north, the country is bounded by a 423-kilometre border with China and shares the 235-kilometre-long Mekong River border with Myanmar.

The topography of Laos is "largely mountainous", with the Annamite Range in the northeast and east and the Luang Prabang Range in the northwest, among other ranges typically characterized by "steep terrain". Elevations are typically above 500 metres with river valleys. This landscape extends across most of the north of the country, except for the plain of Vientiane and the Plain of Jars in the Xiangkhoang Plateau.

The southern "panhandle" of the country contains areas in Savannakhét and Champasak provinces that are more suited for paddy rice cultivation and livestock raising. Most of Khammouan Province and the eastern part of all the southern provinces are "mountainous". Together, the alluvial plains and terraces of the Mekong and its tributaries cover about 20% of the land area.

About 4% of the total land area is classified as arable. The forested land area has declined since the 1970s as a result of commercial logging and expanded swidden, or slash-and-burn, farming.

== Climate ==
Laos Köppen climate classification

Climate data for Vientiane

Laos has a tropical climate, with a rainy season from May through October, a cool dry season from November through February, and a hot dry season in March and April. Generally, monsoons occur at the same time across the country, while that time may vary from 1 year to the next.

Rainfall varies regionally, with the highest amounts—3,700 millimeters (150 inches) annually—recorded on the Bolaven Plateau in Champasak Province. City rainfall stations have recorded that Savannakhét averages 1,440 millimeters (57 inches) of rain annually; Vientiane receives about 1,700 millimeters (67 inches), and Louangphrabang (Luang Prabang) receives about 1,360 millimeters (54 inches).

Rainfall is not always adequate for rice cultivation and the average precipitation conceals years where rainfall may be half or less of the norm, causing declines in rice yields. Such droughts sometimes are regional, leaving production in other parts of the country unaffected.

The average temperatures in January, coolest month, are, Luang Prabang 20.5 °C (minimum 0.8 °C), Vientiane 20.3 °C (minimum 3.3 °C), and Pakse 23.9 °C (minimum 7.8 °C); the average temperatures for April, usually the hottest month, are, Luang Prabang 28.1 °C (maximum 44.8 °C), Vientiane 42.5 °C. Temperature does vary according to the altitude, there is an average drop of 1.7 °C for every 1000 feet (or 300 meters). Temperatures in the upland plateux and in the mountains are considered lower than on the plains around Vientiane.

Climate data for Vientiane (1981–2010)
Month	Jan	Feb	Mar	Apr	May	Jun	Jul	Aug	Sep	Oct	Nov	Dec	Year
Record high °C (°F)	36.0 (96.8)	38.0 (100.4)	40.0 (104.0)	41.4 (106.5)	42.5 (108.5)	39.5 (103.1)	39.0 (102.2)	37.2 (99.0)	37.5 (99.5)	36.8 (98.2)	36.0 (96.8)	36.0 (96.8)	42.5 (108.5)
Mean daily maximum °C (°F)	28.7 (83.7)	30.8 (87.4)	33.1 (91.6)	34.6 (94.3)	33.1 (91.6)	32.2 (90.0)	31.6 (88.9)	31.2 (88.2)	31.3 (88.3)	31.2 (88.2)	30.1 (86.2)	28.3 (82.9)	31.1 (88.0)
Daily mean °C (°F)	22.4 (72.3)	24.7 (76.5)	27.1 (80.8)	29.0 (84.2)	28.4 (83.1)	28.1 (82.6)	27.7 (81.9)	27.5 (81.5)	27.3 (81.1)	26.8 (80.2)	24.8 (76.6)	22.2 (72.0)	26.3 (79.3)
Mean daily minimum °C (°F)	17.4 (63.3)	19.6 (67.3)	22.1 (71.8)	24.5 (76.1)	24.9 (76.8)	25.2 (77.4)	25.0 (77.0)	24.8 (76.6)	24.3 (75.7)	23.4 (74.1)	20.5 (68.9)	17.3 (63.1)	22.4 (72.3)
Record low °C (°F)	3.3 (37.9)	7.6 (45.7)	10.0 (50.0)	16.8 (62.2)	19.0 (66.2)	20.0 (68.0)	19.5 (67.1)	20.6 (69.1)	18.8 (65.8)	12.9 (55.2)	8.9 (48.0)	5.0 (41.0)	3.3 (37.9)
Average precipitation mm (inches)	7.8 (0.31)	15.3 (0.60)	39.2 (1.54)	92.8 (3.65)	233.5 (9.19)	264.6 (10.42)	307.2 (12.09)	332.9 (13.11)	270.2 (10.64)	96.6 (3.80)	13.5 (0.53)	3.7 (0.15)	1,677.2 (66.03)
Average rainy days	1.0	2.0	5.0	8.0	16.0	19.0	20.0	22.0	17.0	9.0	2.0	1.0	122.0
Average relative humidity (%)	70	68	66	69	78	82	82	84	83	78	72	70	75
Mean monthly sunshine hours	239.8	216.9	218.5	227.6	195.3	140.8	129.9	133.0	165.9	210.5	228.5	246.6	2,353.5
Source 1: World Meteorological Organization, Deutscher Wetterdienst (extremes 1907–1990), Pogoda.ru.net, tutiempo.net
Source 2: NOAA (humidity 1961–1990)

Climate data for Pakse (1981–2010)
Month	Jan	Feb	Mar	Apr	May	Jun	Jul	Aug	Sep	Oct	Nov	Dec	Year
Record high °C (°F)	36.7 (98.1)	37.8 (100.0)	38.9 (102.0)	40.8 (105.4)	41.3 (106.3)	38.3 (100.9)	38.2 (100.8)	35.0 (95.0)	36.0 (96.8)	36.7 (98.1)	36.7 (98.1)	36.6 (97.9)	41.3 (106.3)
Mean daily maximum °C (°F)	32.0 (89.6)	33.5 (92.3)	35.1 (95.2)	35.5 (95.9)	33.5 (92.3)	31.6 (88.9)	31.0 (87.8)	30.5 (86.9)	31.0 (87.8)	31.3 (88.3)	31.2 (88.2)	30.8 (87.4)	32.3 (90.1)
Daily mean °C (°F)	25.6 (78.1)	27.7 (81.9)	29.6 (85.3)	30.4 (86.7)	29.1 (84.4)	28.1 (82.6)	27.6 (81.7)	27.2 (81.0)	27.3 (81.1)	27.1 (80.8)	26.2 (79.2)	24.9 (76.8)	27.6 (81.7)
Mean daily minimum °C (°F)	18.7 (65.7)	21.4 (70.5)	24.1 (75.4)	25.8 (78.4)	25.3 (77.5)	24.9 (76.8)	24.5 (76.1)	24.3 (75.7)	24.1 (75.4)	23.1 (73.6)	21.1 (70.0)	18.9 (66.0)	23.0 (73.4)
Record low °C (°F)	7.8 (46.0)	10.8 (51.4)	12.8 (55.0)	19.8 (67.6)	21.7 (71.1)	21.5 (70.7)	21.4 (70.5)	21.5 (70.7)	20.0 (68.0)	16.7 (62.1)	13.9 (57.0)	8.9 (48.0)	7.8 (46.0)
Average precipitation mm (inches)	1.5 (0.06)	10.4 (0.41)	26.5 (1.04)	67.3 (2.65)	229.6 (9.04)	351.3 (13.83)	414.6 (16.32)	504.6 (19.87)	308.2 (12.13)	128.9 (5.07)	25.3 (1.00)	2.2 (0.09)	2,070.6 (81.52)
Average rainy days	0	1	3	8	17	21	24	25	20	12	5	1	138
Average relative humidity (%)	62	60	59	65	75	82	83	85	84	79	72	67	72.8
Mean monthly sunshine hours	274.5	243.9	244.5	227.1	202.0	145.0	142.2	126.6	141.2	188.3	225.7	249.3	2,410.4
Source 1: World Meteorological Organization, tutiempo.net
Source 2: NOAA (humidity 1961–1990), Deutscher Wetterdienst (extremes), The Yearbook of Indochina (1932-1933)

== Agriculture ==
5 million out of 23,680,000 hectares of Laos's total land area is suitable for cultivation, and 17% of the land area, between 850,000 and 900,000 hectares, was cultivated as of the 1990s. Rice is a crop grown during the rainy season.

Agricultural cultivation is possible with varying weather on a portion of land area apart from the Vientiane plain and the lowlands along the Mekong Valley. These cultivated areas are situated in the valleys cut by the rivers or the plateau regions of Xieng Khouang in the North and in the Bolavens in the south. Typically there are only two ways to cultivate: either the wet-field paddy system practiced among the Lao Loum or lowland in Lao, or the swidden cultivation system practiced in the hills.

== Human geography ==
The overall population density was 18 persons per square kilometer, and in some districts the density was fewer than 10 persons per square kilometer. Population density per cultivated hectare ranged from 3.3 to 7.8 persons per hectare.

== Natural resources and environmental issues ==
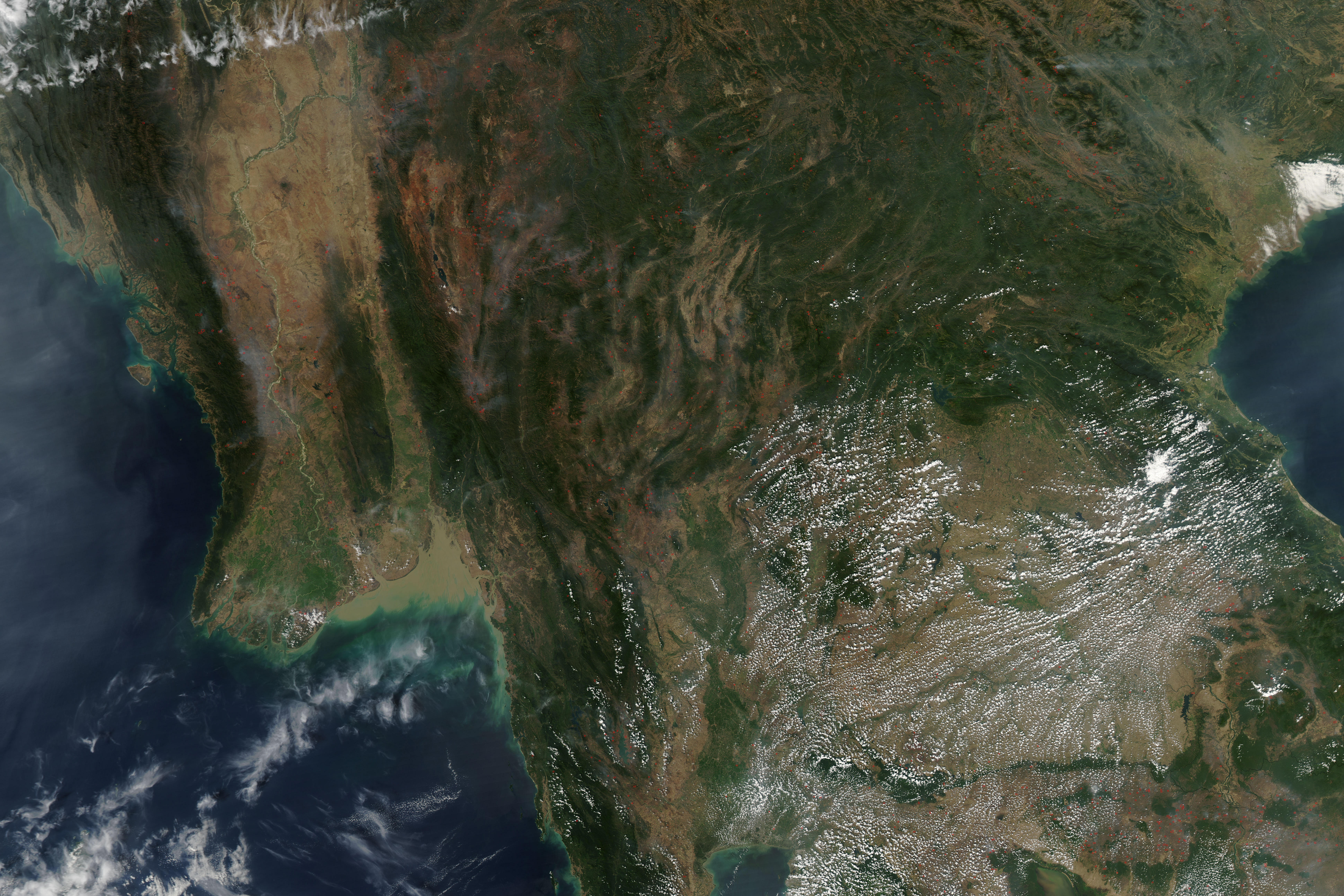
Hundreds of active fires burning across the hills and valleys of Myanmar, Thailand, Laos, and Vietnam (labelled with red dots)

The natural resources of Laos include timber, hydropower, gypsum, tin, gold, and gemstones.

The United Nations Development Programme warns: "Protecting the environment and sustainable use of natural resources in Lao PDR is vital for poverty reduction and economic growth."

== Area and boundaries ==
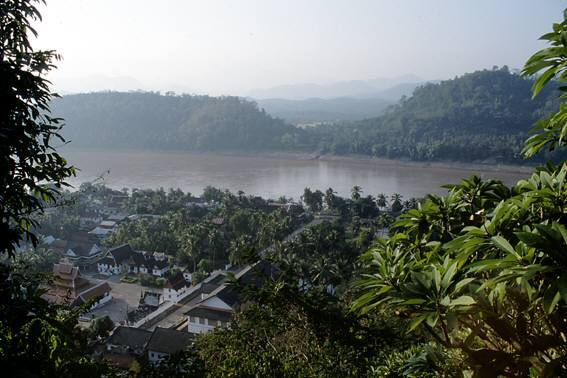
The Mekong river at Luang Prabang, Laos

Area
- Total: 236,800 km^{2} (91,400 square miles)
  - country rank in the world: 82nd
- Land: 230,800 km^{2} (89,100 square miles)
- Water: 6,000 km^{2} (2,300 square miles)
Land boundaries
- Total: 5,274 km (3,277 miles)
- Border countries:
  - Cambodia: 555 km (345 miles)
  - China: 475 km (295 miles)
  - Myanmar: 238 km (148 miles)
  - Thailand: 1,845 km (1,146 miles)
  - Vietnam: 2,161 km (1,343 miles)
Elevation extremes
- Lowest point: Mekong River 70 m (230 feet)
- Highest point: Phou Bia 2,817 metres (9,242 ft)

== See also ==
- National Biodiversity Conservation Areas
- Zomia
- Transport in Laos
