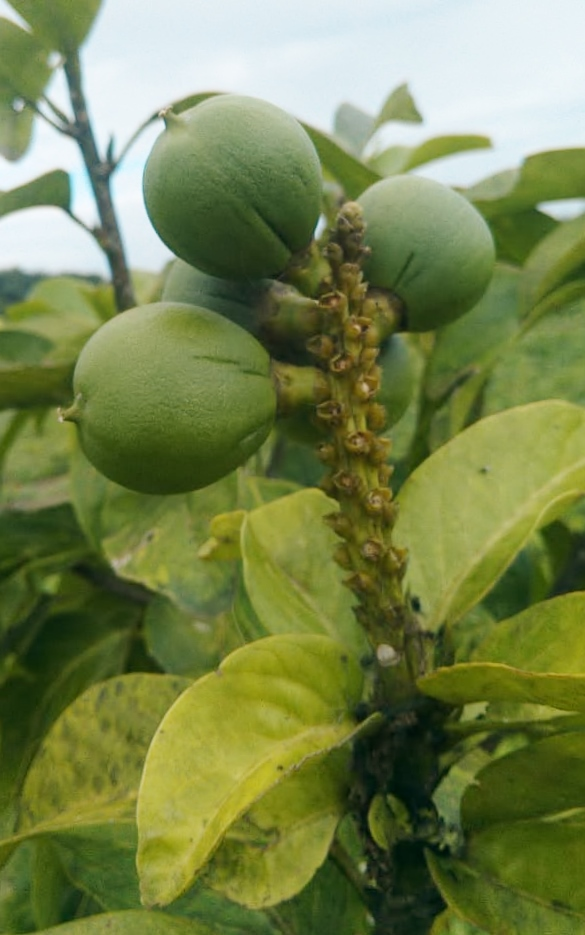
- Cacay fruits, near Puerto Gaitán, Meta, Colombia.

Conservation status
- Least Concern (IUCN 3.1)

Scientific classification
- Kingdom: Plantae
- Clade: Embryophytes
- Clade: Tracheophytes
- Clade: Spermatophytes
- Clade: Angiosperms
- Clade: Eudicots
- Clade: Rosids
- Order: Malpighiales
- Family: Euphorbiaceae
- Genus: Caryodendron
- Species: C. orinocense

Binomial name
- Caryodendron orinocense H.Karst.
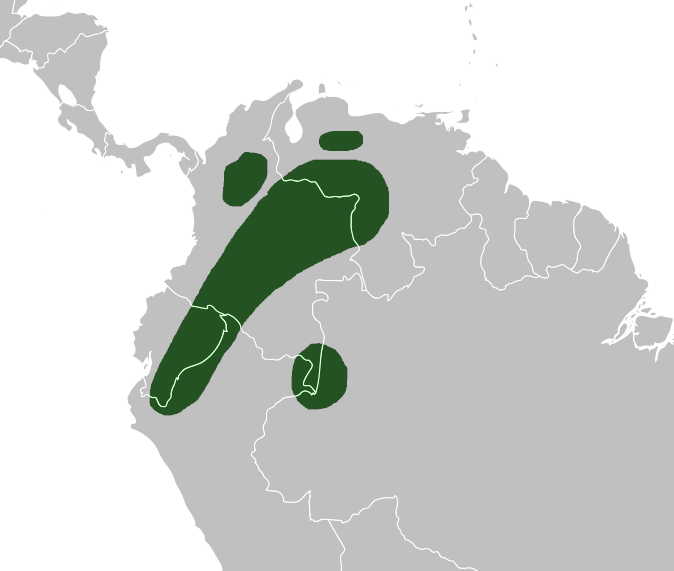
- Approximate distribution of Caryodendron orinocense

= Caryodendron orinocense =

Species of tree

Caryodendron orinocense, commonly known as cacay, inchi or orinoconut, is an evergreen tree belonging to the family Euphorbiaceae.

This species of flowering plant is indigenous to the north-west of South America, particularly from the drainage basins of the Orinoco and Amazon rivers located in Colombia, Venezuela, Ecuador, Peru and Brazil. Originally described by Hermann Karsten in 1858, the cacay tree distinguishes itself by its dense and leafy top, as well as its production of fruits, each one containing three edible nuts. Cacay is notable for the oil extracted from its nuts, which is edible and is also used in cosmetics.

== Description ==
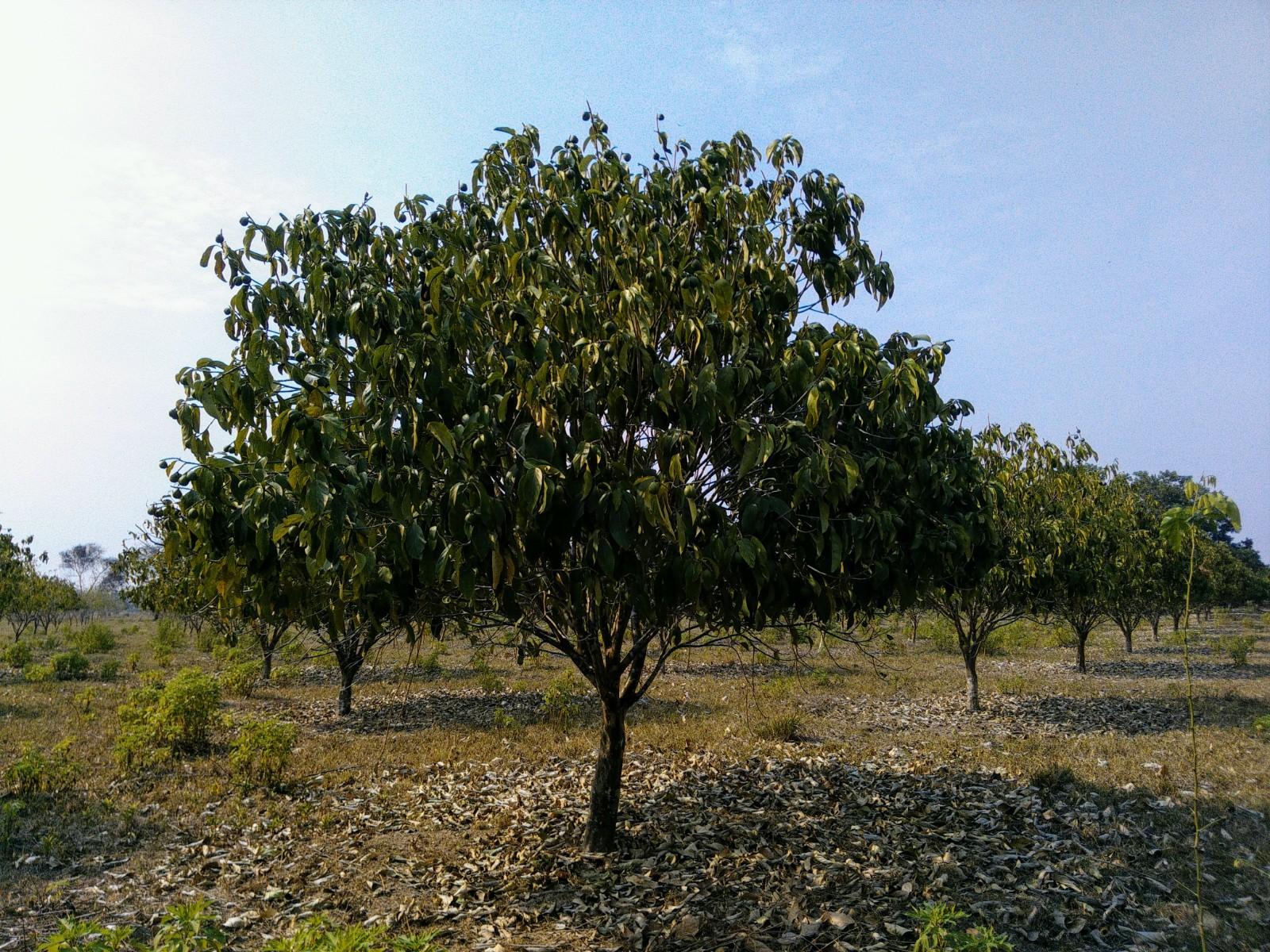
Adult trees in a plantation

Caryodendron orinocense is a tree which can grow to 30–40 metres (100–130 ft) tall in the forest. In plantations, the tree reaches heights of up to 15 metres (50 ft). Its trunk is straight and cylindrical before separating into numerous branches. Its outer bark is smooth, and is periodically shed as laminar plates. It possesses a wide and superficial root system, such that its thick roots are sometimes visible above ground. The longevity of the species exceeds 60 years.

Cacay is an evergreen tree and has a dense and leafy crown. Its leaves are simple and are arranged in an alternate pattern on the stem. Their shape is elliptical or oval, between 12–25 centimetres (4.7–9.8 in) long and 4–10 centimetres (1.6–3.9 in) wide.

It is a dioecious plant, with male and female specimens. Its male inflorescence is a terminal raceme with small greenish flowers between 2.5–3.5 millimetres (0.098–0.138 in) in diameter. Neither male nor female flowers display any petals. Its female inflorescence is a terminal ear, also with greenish flowers ranging between 2.5–3.5 millimetres (0.098–0.138 in) in diameter, containing large and persistent bracts.

Its fruit is a brownish/grey oval and woody capsule between 3.2–4.5 centimetres (1.3–1.8 in) in diameter. Each fruit contains three nuts or kernels (rarely two or four), which are slightly convex and have three faces. Each nut contains a single seed covered by a testa and weights approximately 2.7 grams (0.095 oz).

== Taxonomy and etymology ==
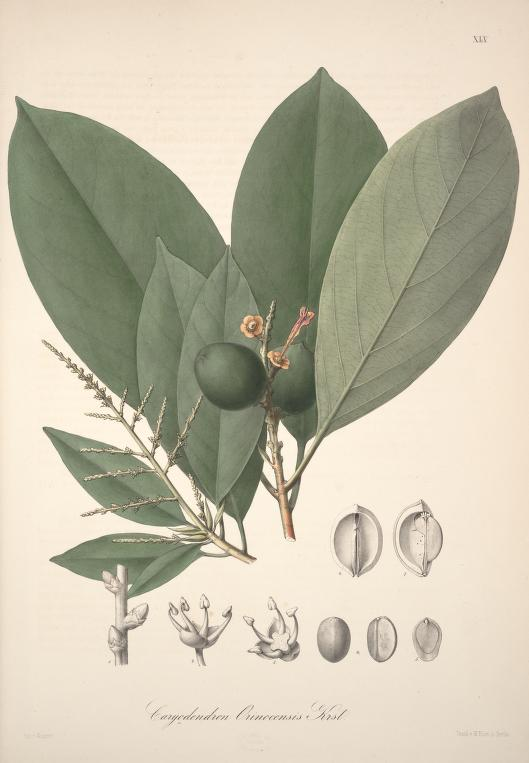
Illustration in Florae Columbiae (1858)

The species Caryodendron orinocense was described in 1858 by the German botanist Hermann Karsten, and was published in Florae Columbiae. In its scientific name, the term Caryodendron is derived from the ancient Greek káryon, meaning "nut", and déndron, meaning "tree". Its epithet orinocense suggests that the species was first identified near the Orinoco river.

Caryodendron orinocense is found under the following phylogenetic tree within the Caryodendreae tribe. (Note: In some sources, the scientific name Dioicia tetrandia L. appears as a synonym of Caryodendron orinocense.) The number in parentheses represents the year in which the species was described.

- Caryodendreae
  - - Alchorneopsis
  - - Caryodendron
      - Caryodendron amazonicum (1943)
      - Caryodendron angustifolium (1929)
      - Caryodendron janeirense (1874)
      - Caryodendron orinocense (1858)
  - - Discoglypremna

=== Common names ===
The vernacular names of Caryodendron orinocensese include:

- Cacay
- Inchi (Note: Caryodendron orinocensese (commonly known as cacay, inchi, or orinoconut) should not be mistaken with Plukenetia volubilis, which is commonly known as sacha inchi.)
- Tacay
- Orinoconut or Orinoco nut
- Maní de árbol
- Nuez or nogal de Barquisimeto
- Nuez de Barinas
- Meto huayo or Metohuayo
- Palo de nuez
- Nueza criolla

== Distribution, habitat, and ecology ==
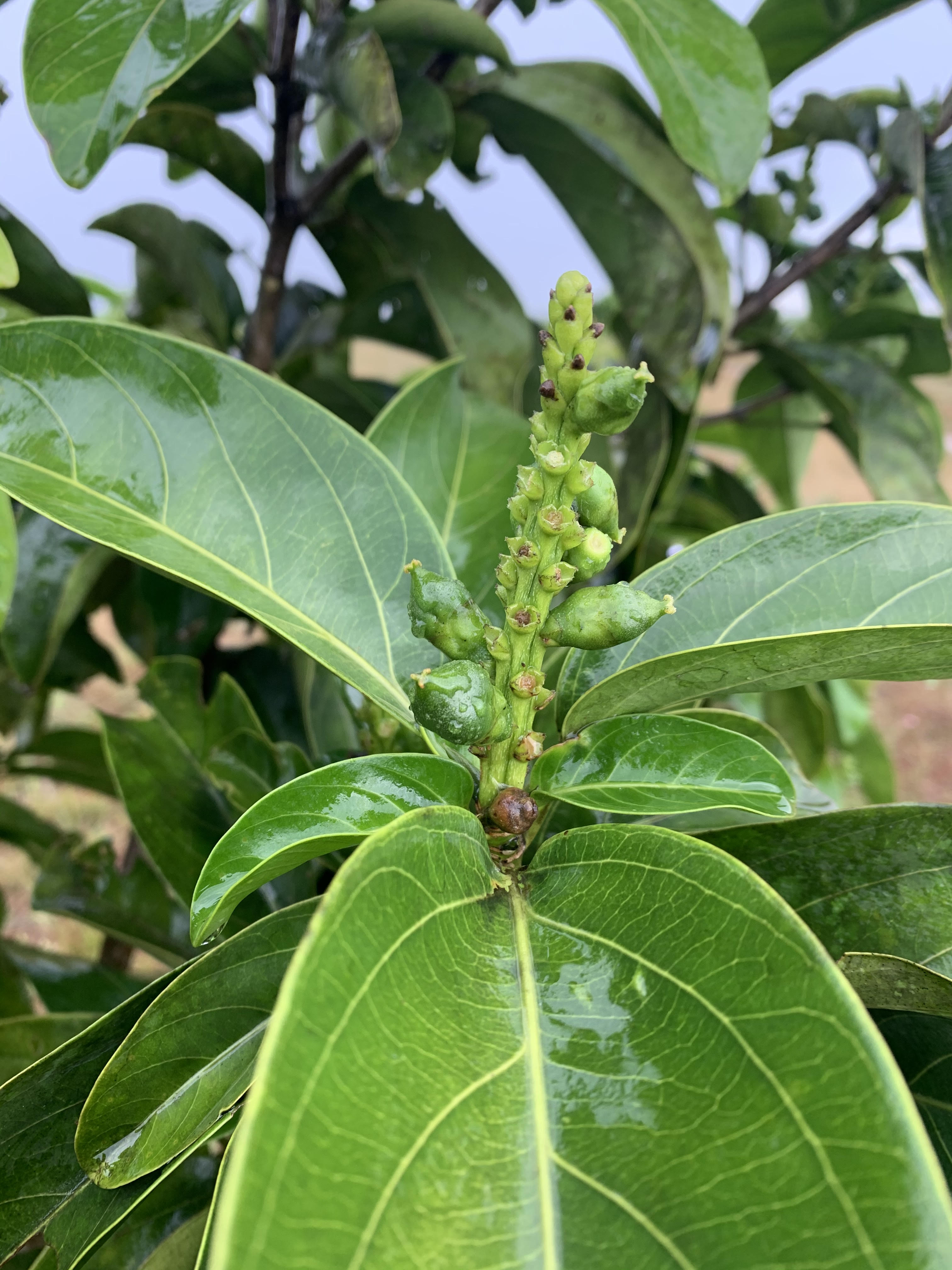
Female flowers

Cacay is an indigenous species to the drainage basins of the Orinoco and Amazon rivers, and can be found in Colombia, Venezuela, Ecuador, Peru and Brazil. In Colombia, cacay is distributed across the Piedemonte llanero (Note: The Piedemonte Llanero is a wedge duplex zone on the eastern flank of the Eastern Ranges of Colombia.) in the eastern foothills of the Andes Mountains. It is also found in the watershed of the Magdalena River. The species has been reported in five Colombian departments (Antioquia, Caquetá, Cundinamarca, Meta, Putumayo) with influence over three Colombian natural regions (Andean, Orinoquía or Eastern Plains, and Amazon). In Venezuela, the plant grows in the states of Apure, Lara, y Barinas. Cacay can also be found in Ecuador, Peru and Brazil in the western part of the Amazon river watershed.

The tree grows in the transition between tropical moist forest and tropical wet forest, receiving an average annual precipitation of 2,000–5,000 millimetres (80–200 in). It develops preferably in terrains with good drainage that do not easily flood. It tolerates a few months of moderate drought, but does not support long dry periods. The species is also able to support short periods of water saturation, but cannot withstand permanent waterlogging. Cacay prospers in fertile soils originating from alluvial deposits, but can adapt to ultisol and oxisol soils which are acidic and poor in nutrient content.

Cacay develops best in warm climates and in low-altitude plains, with average temperatures of 22–28 °C (72–82 °F) and relative humidity of 70-90%. However, cacay is found in altitudes ranging from sea level to 2300 m a.s.l.

== Propagation ==
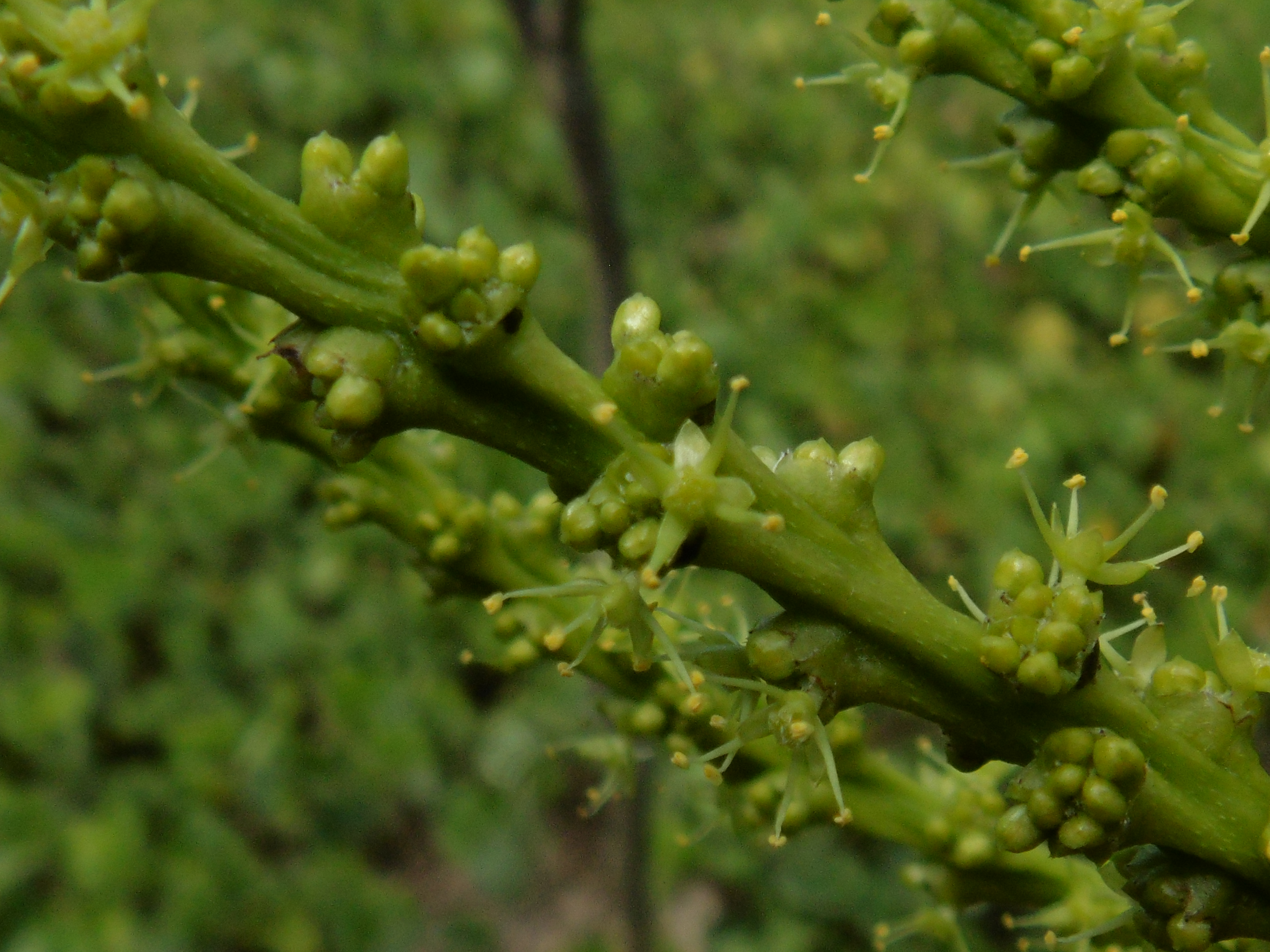
Male flowers

Under natural conditions, the reproduction of cacay is sexual; its seeds germinate well on the ground, one to two weeks after falling from the tree. The species' seeds are recalcitrant, as the seeds quickly lose their viability when under storage. A study conducted in 2012 by Judith García and Carmen Basso concluded that cacay seeds tolerate up to eight days of storage before losing viability, preferably in temperatures of 12–13 °C (54–55 °F).

The species can also reproduce through vegetative (asexual) means, especially through grafting, which is commonly used in cacay farming. Conversely, propagation by plant cutting does not yield satisfactory results, as even when the plant shows callus growth, it does not produce any new development of roots or buds.

== Farming ==
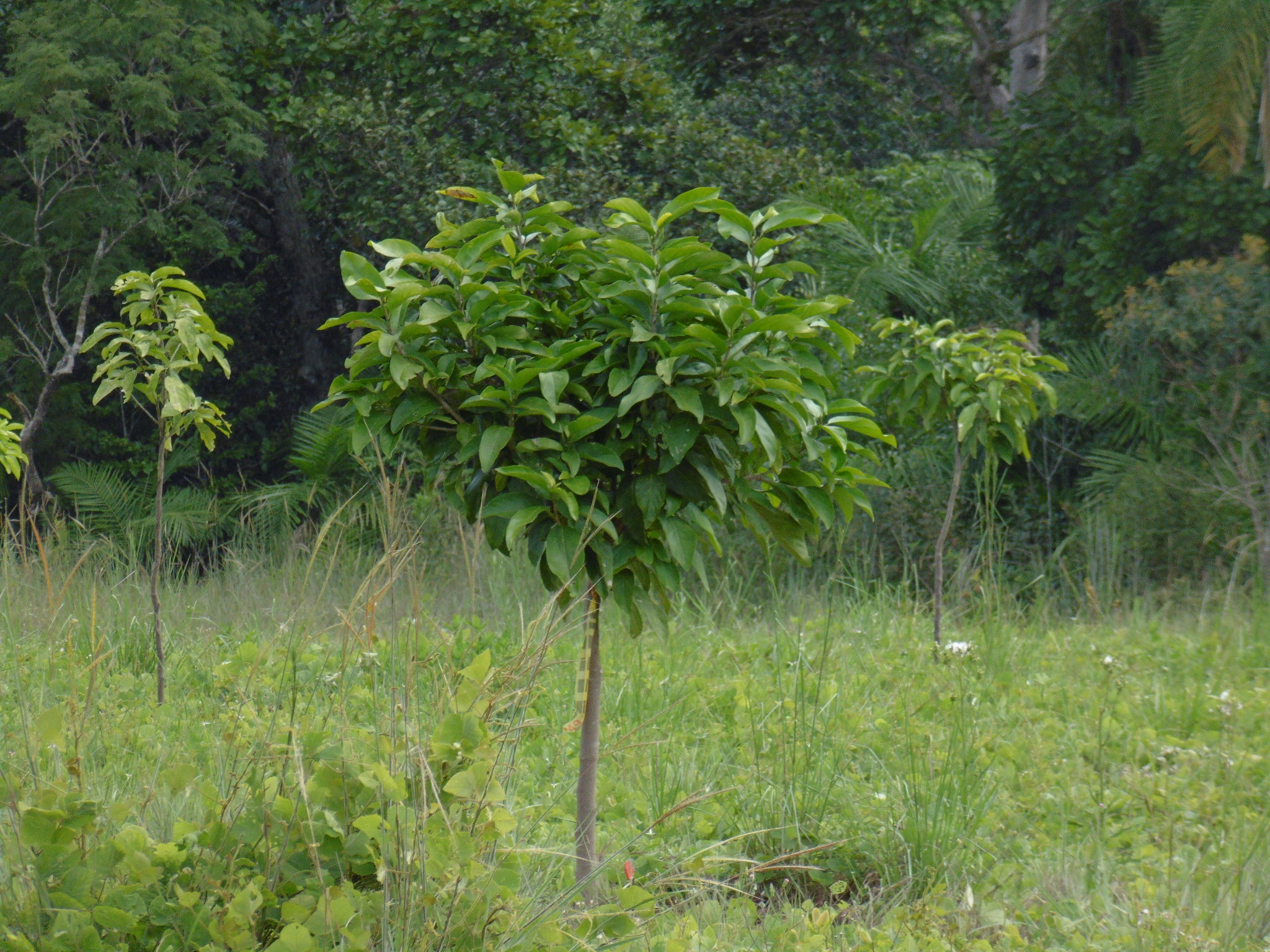
A two-year-old juvenile tree in a plantation

The cultivated cacay tree initially grows slowly. During this stage, moderate shade favorably contributes to its development. Cacay can be planted in bags in a nursery for approximately one year, until the tree reaches a height of about 50 centimetres (20 in). When the tree is actively producing fruits, the cacay plant is a heliophyte, although it tolerates some shade. Cacay should be planted in parallel with another plant that grows rapidly and that possesses a small crown which may provide shade to the juvenile cacay tree, but which does not compete for sunlight during the cacay's adult stage. Some plantations associate the cacay tree with another crop that may provide a live vegetable groundcover, (Note: A cover crop is a crop that provides a vegetable coverage of the ground, whether temporary or permanent, and which is planted in association with another crop.) for example kudzu.

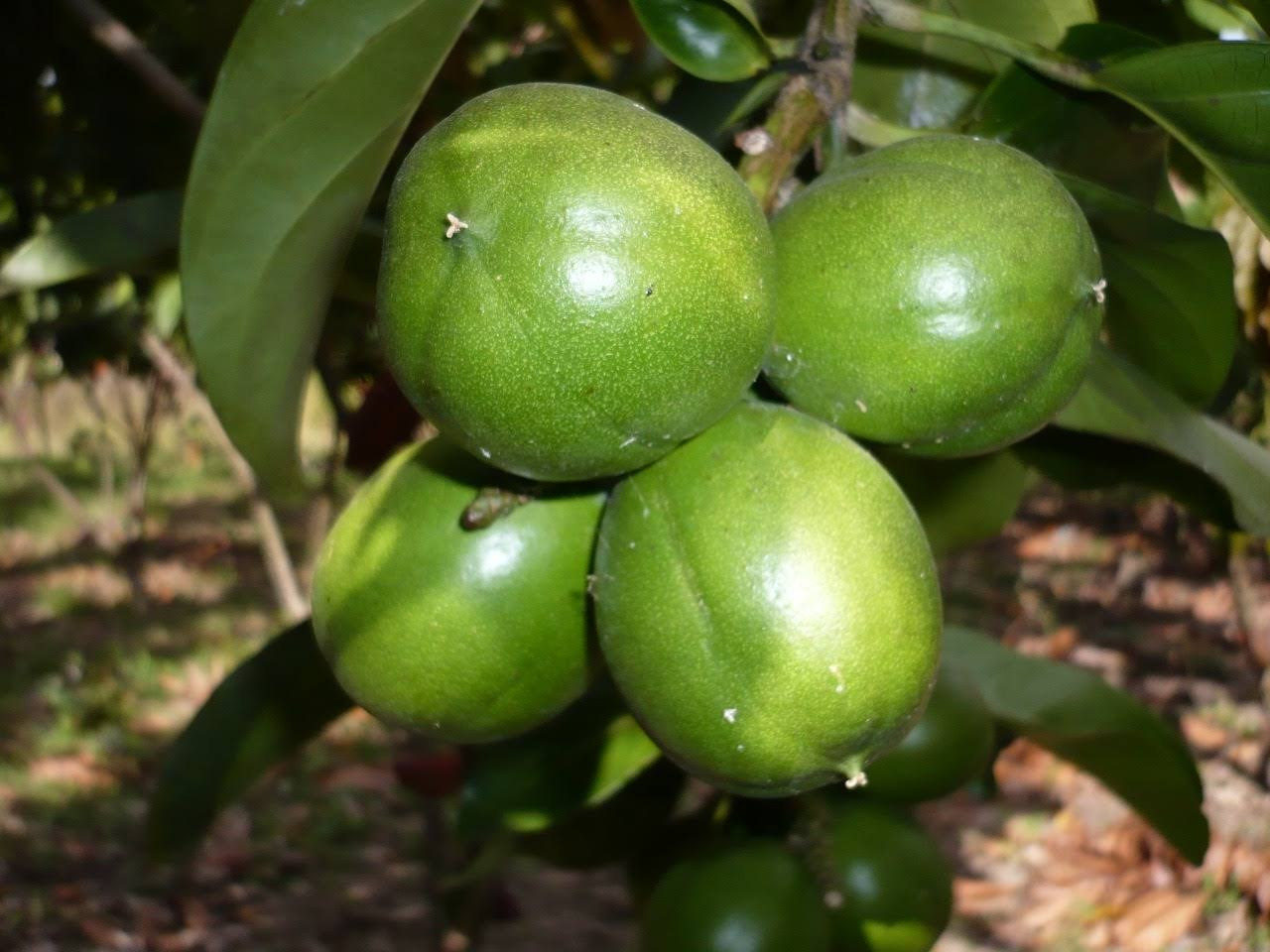
Fruit

The ripe cacay fruit physiologically separates itself from the plant and falls to the ground. Cacay trees begin to produce fruit at ages 4–7 years. A single 10-year-old cacay tree may produce 100–250 kilograms (220–550 lb) of nuts per year, although some trees have been reported to produce up to 800 kilograms (1,760 lb) of nuts per year.

== Properties and uses ==
=== Cacay oil ===
Cacay is renowned for the quality of its plant oil. Each cacay fruit generally produces three nuts, from which a liquid oil with a yellow-greenish color can be extracted. This oil comprises between 40-60% of the seed's weight. Several studies (Pérez 2001, Cisneros Torres 2006) report that the cacay oil is composed of 71-75% of linoleic acid, an essential fatty acid from the omega-6 fatty acid family, which is important for skincare purposes. Other studies have reported linoleic acid content of 58% (Medeiros de Azevedo 2020) and 85% (Radice 2014). This high concentration of polyunsaturated fats (in this case, of linoleic acid) is superior to that of soybean oil (60%), corn/maize oil (55.5%), sesame oil (42%), peanut oil (26%), coconut oil (14%), olive oil (9.5%), and palm oil (8%).

Cacay oil is used in the production of cosmetic products such as soaps, sunscreens, and skincare creams. The full value proposition of this oil for cosmetic purposes is still being developed; however, various studies (Pérez 2001, Ortega Álvarez 2014) have already remarked on the future potential of cacay in this field. The cacay oil is also used directly as an edible oil.

=== Nutrition ===
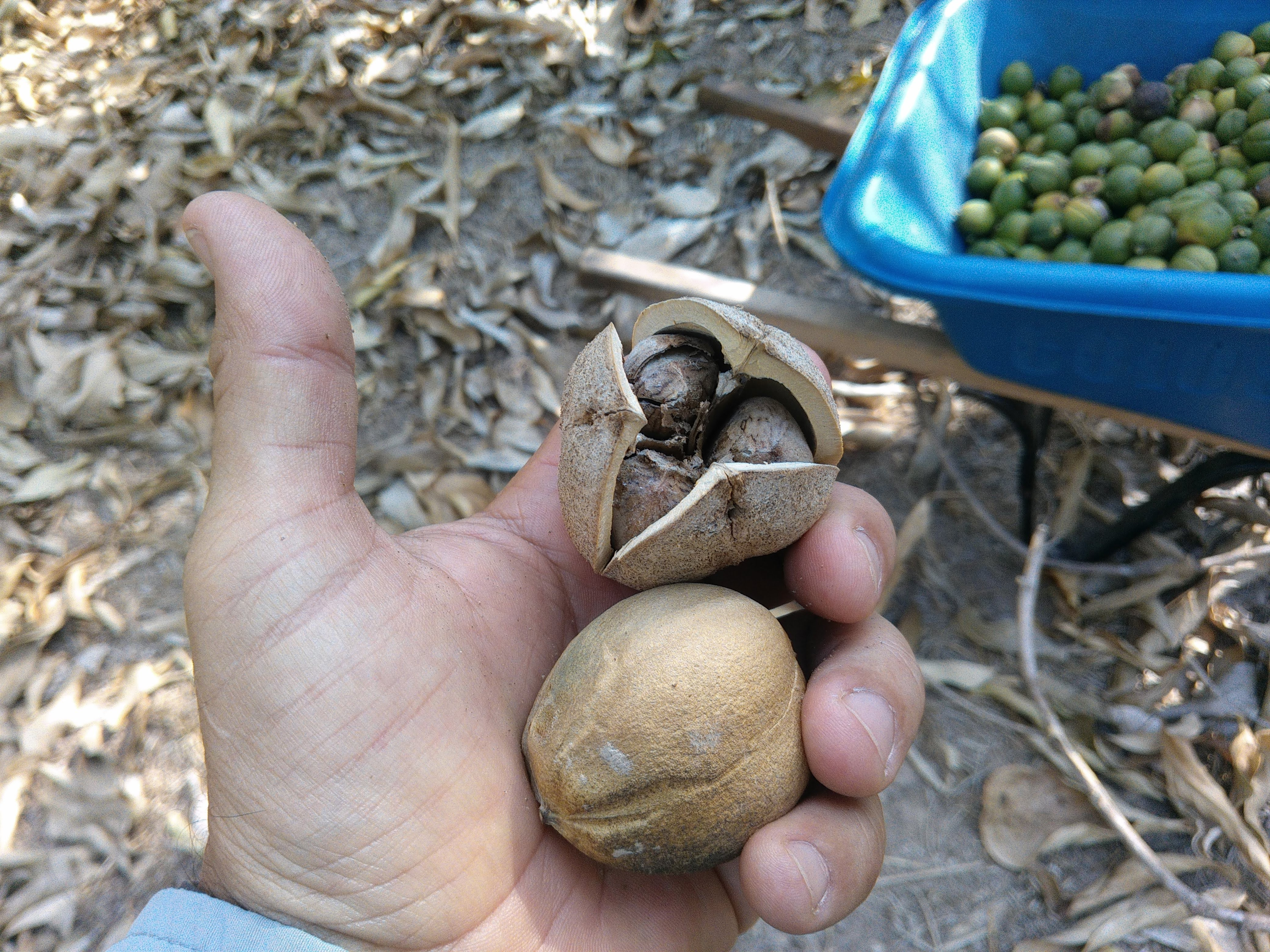
Ripe fruit with three seeds

Composition of the cacay nut/kernel
Properties	Quantity
Plant oil	40-60%
Polyunsaturated fat (in the oil)	71-75%
Calories per nut	641-691
Protein	15-19%
Starch	17%

The cacay nut is rich in phosphorus, calcium, and iron. About 15-19% of the nut is composed of protein, while the press cake (the dry organic matter after the oil is extracted) is composed 43-46% of protein. The nuts from ripe cacay fruits are edible and have a pleasant taste, similar to that of peanuts. Nuts can be eaten uncooked, toasted, fried, or boiled with salt. The nuts can also be used to prepare foods such as cakes, turrón, beverages, and cookies. After grinding down the nut, its flour can be used to produce vitamin supplements, as well as to elaborate functional foods.

=== Other uses ===
Its lumber can be used for woodworking structures, and may be utilized as firewood and in the production of charcoal. Cacay trees may also be used to provide shade to other crops that need it (as possibly coffee plantations) and for other animals. Within the domain of agroforestry, cacay trees may be introduced into areas that are not adequate for intense agricultural and cattle raining activities. Furthermore, the tree also attracts bees through the nectar excreted from its leaves, aiding in the tree's pollination. Lastly, the nut's press cake can also serve as food for cattle due to its high content of proteins and minerals.

== Ecological value ==
Cacay has been identified as one of the several trees indigenous to the Eastern Plains region of Colombia that may serve in the ecological restoration of areas of the savanna containing invasive species of grasses such as Brachiaria humidicola. Crops of Caryodendron orinocense, as well as those of other native trees, may help in the conservation and reforestation of their area's ecosystem.
