= Guatopo National Park =

Venezuelan national park

Guatopo National Park Parque Nacional Guatopo
- IUCN category II (national park)
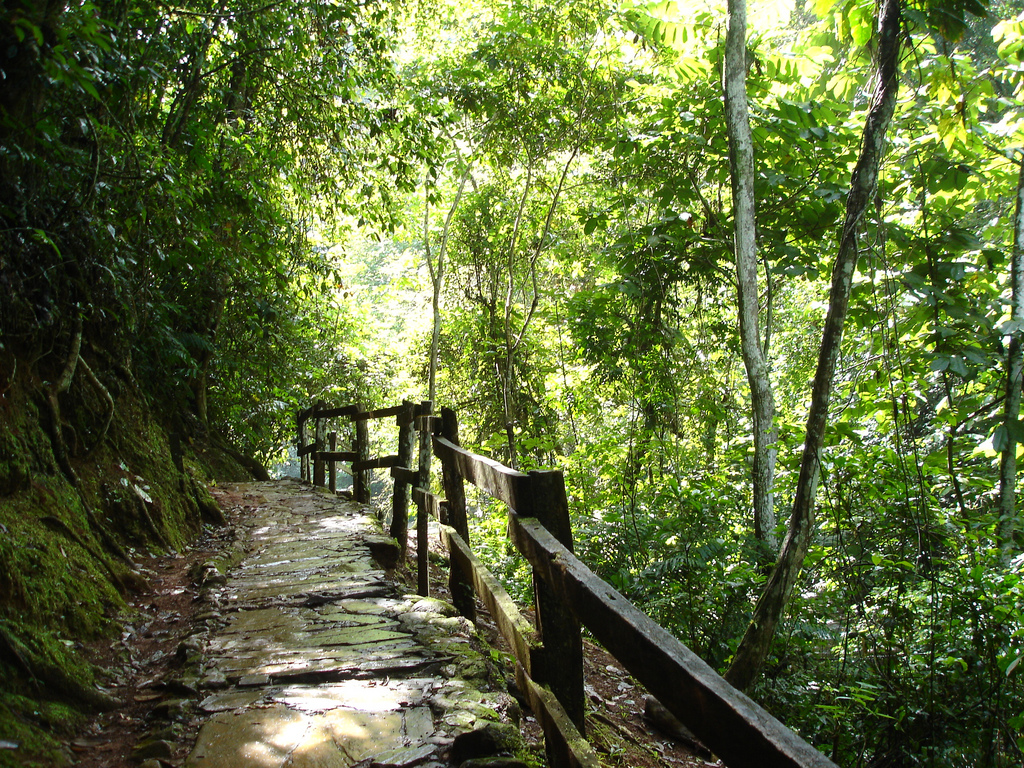

- Location within Venezuela
- Location: Venezuela
- Coordinates: 10°04′N 66°25′W
- Area: 1,224.64 km^{2} (472.84 sq mi)
- Established: March 28, 1958

The Guatopo National Park (Spanish: Parque nacional Guatopo) Is a protected area with the status of national park in the north of the South American country of Venezuela. It is located specifically between the states of Miranda and Guárico, bordered on the north by the Cordillera de la Costa and the Barlovento Plain, on the south by the Piedemonte llanero, on the east it borders on the continuation of the Serranía del Interior and The west with the continuation of the same Serranía and with the Valleys of the Tuy.

These lands were owned by Don Pedro de Ponte Andrade Jaspe and Montenegro, registered, bought in 1687 by Don Francisco Araujo de Figueroa and Don Diego Fenandez de la Mota and sold to Don Pedro de Ponte Andrade Jaspe and Montenegro in 1701 by the widow Maria Araujo Of Figueroa heiress of Captain Diego Fernandez de la Mota.

These lands were declared a national park in 1958 and expropriated by the Venezuelan government in accordance with Presidential Decree No. 257 of April 8, 1960, published in Official Gazette No. 26230 of April 11, 1960.

== Gallery ==
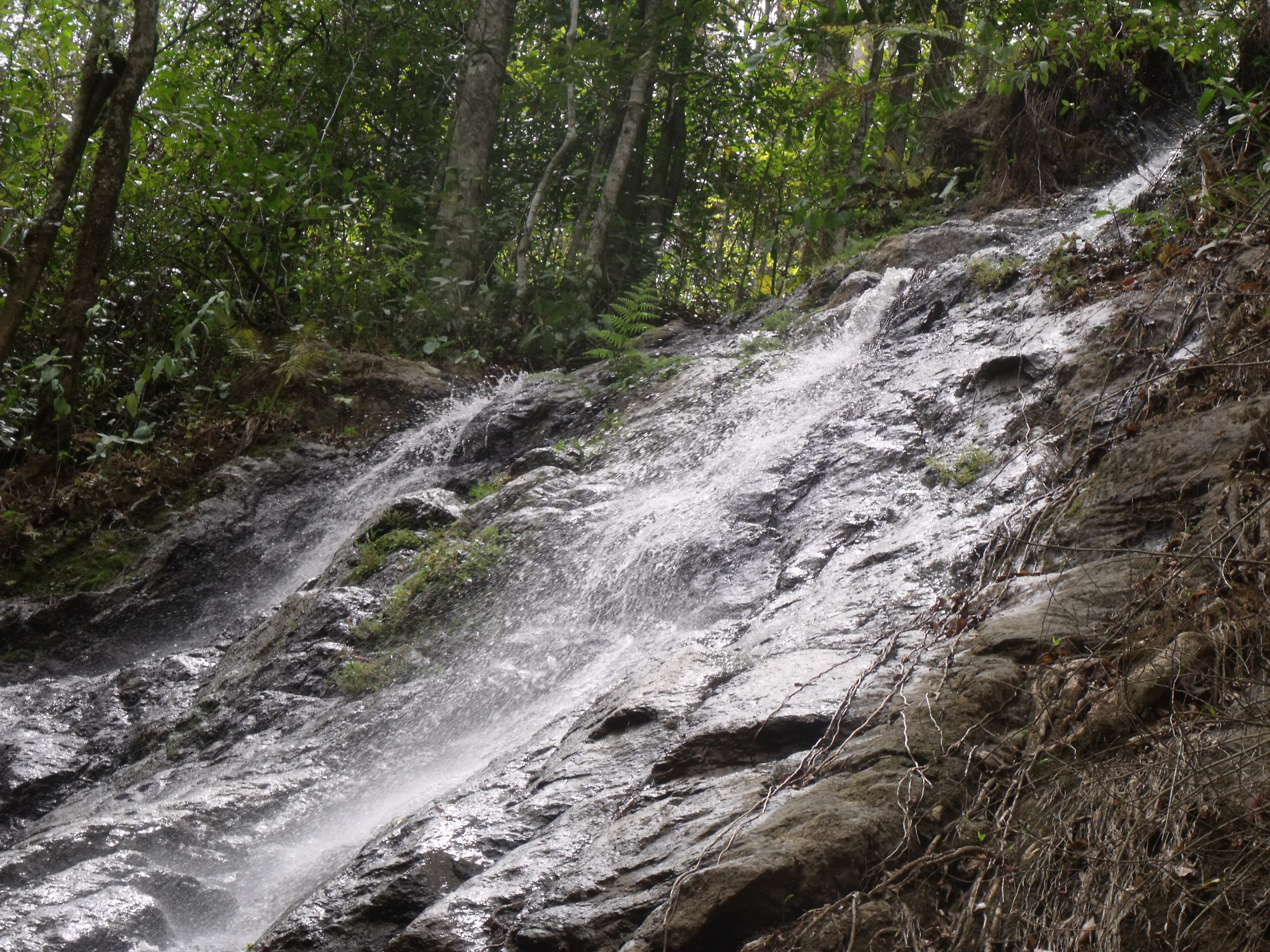

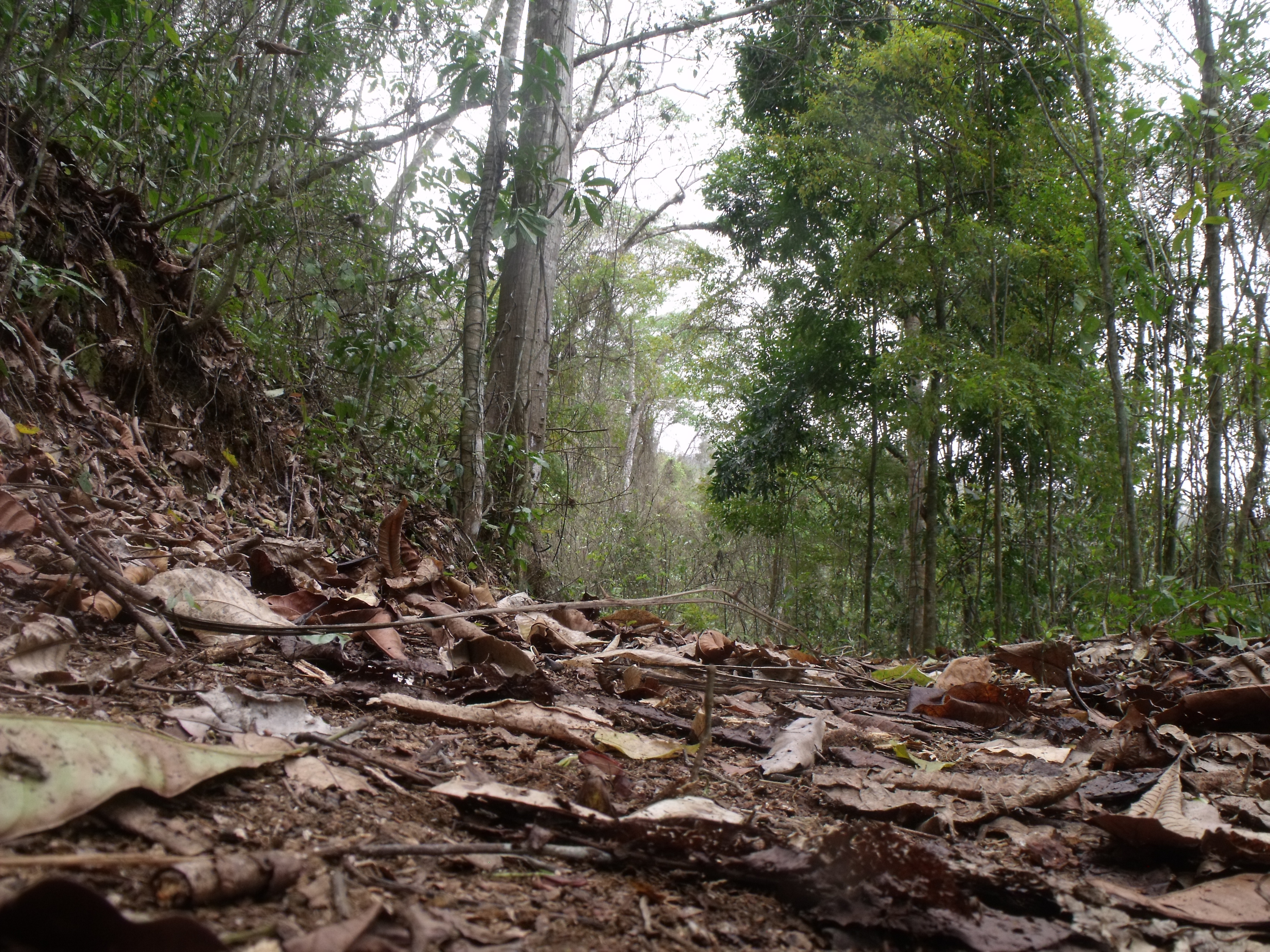

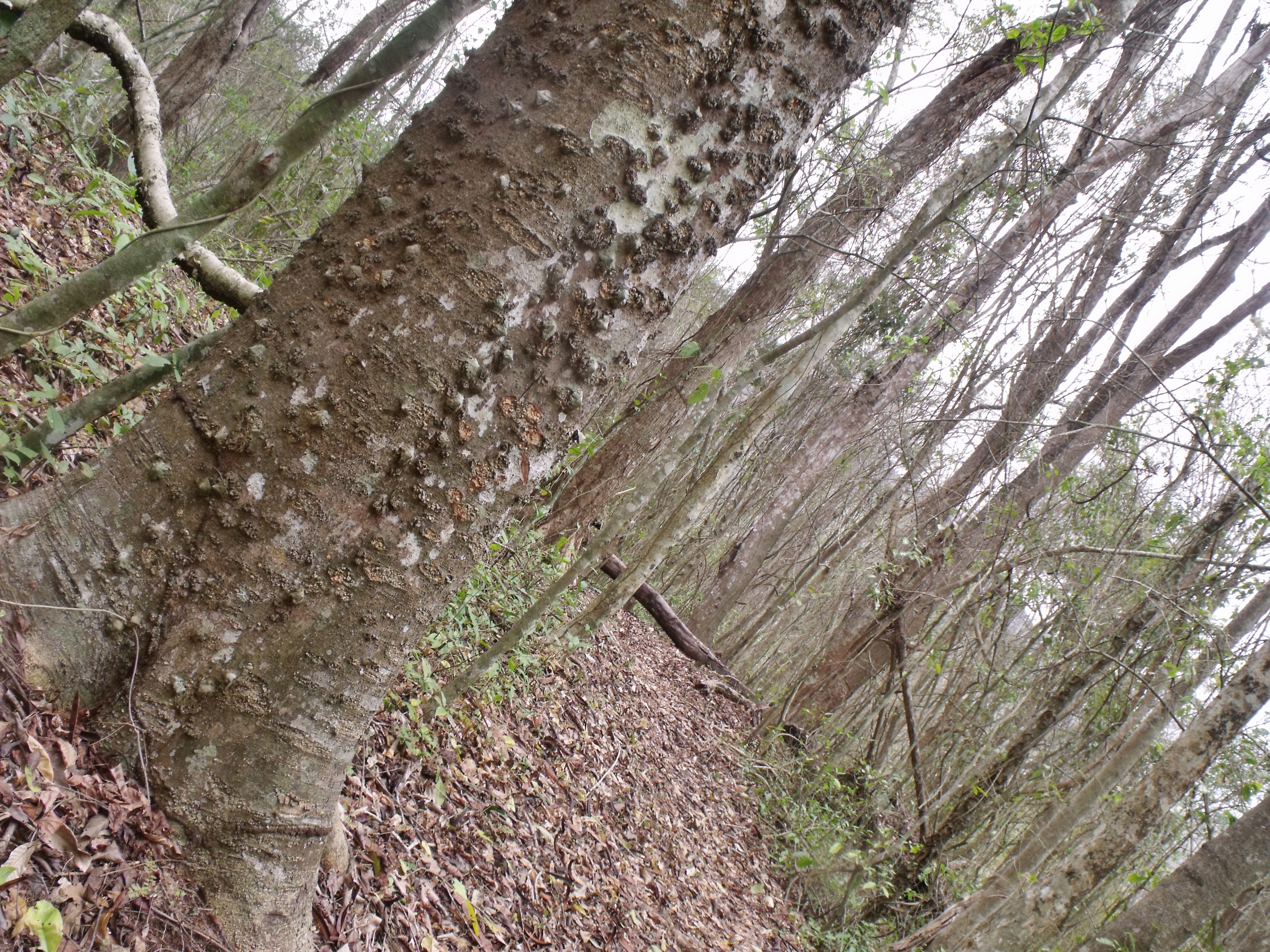

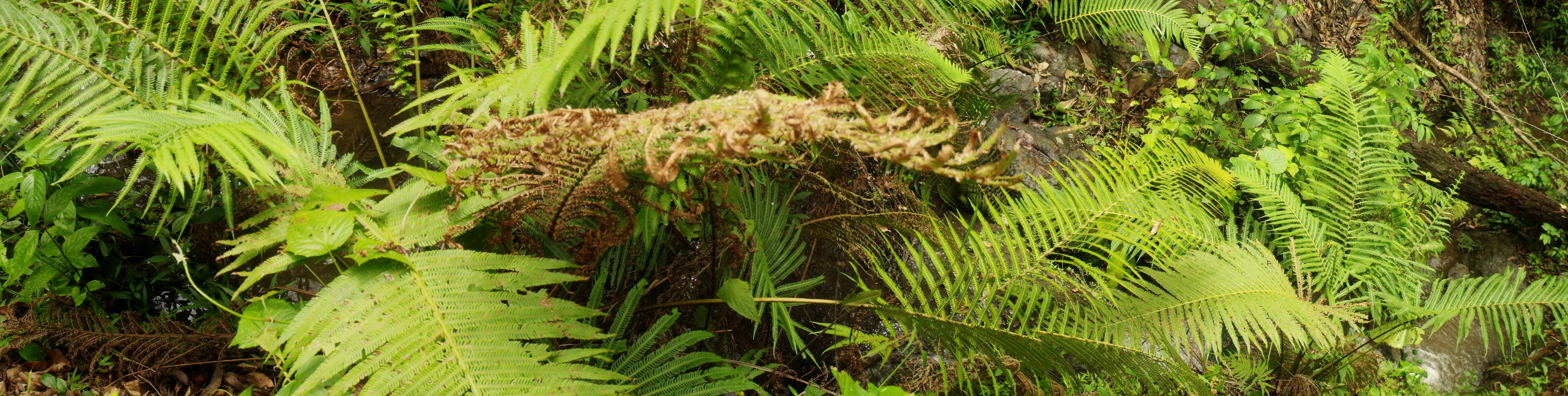

== See also ==
- List of national parks of Venezuela
- Sierra Nevada National Park (Venezuela)
