= Rosana Chirinos Gallardo =

Rosana Sonia Chirinos Gallardo
- Born: 1970 (age 55–56); Lima
- Education: National Agrarian University La Molina; Université catholique de Louvain
- Awards: Recognition for scientific work and contributions to university research by the National Assembly of Rectors of Peru. L'Oréal-UNESCO "For Women in Science" Award 2014
- Scientific career
- Fields: Food technology
- Workplaces: National Agrarian University La Molina

Rosana Sonia Chirinos Gallardo (born 1970, Lima) is a engineer, professor, and researcher specializing in food biotechnology. Her research focuses on bioactive compounds derived from native biodiversity, functional foods, and sustainable bioprocesses. She serves as a professor at the Faculty of Food Industries at the National Agrarian University La Molina (UNALM) and is a principal researcher at the Biotechnology Institute, within the Industrial Biotechnology and Bioprocesses division at UNALM.

== Biography ==
Rosana Sonia Chirinos Gallardo was born in 1970 in Lima, Peru. Her interest in science was sparked by a curiosity about the properties of plants and the health benefits associated with their biochemical composition.

In 1994, she finished her studies in Food Industries Engineering and later obtained a Master's degree in Food Technology, both from the National Agrarian University La Molina (UNALM). Subsequently, she specialized in biotechnology and biological engineering, obtaining a Ph.D. in Agricultural Sciences and Biological Engineering at the Catholic University of Louvain in Belgium. During her doctoral studies, she focused her research on enzymatic technologies for food processing and bioproduct development.

== Career ==
Her early research focused on enzymatic transformations in plant-derived compounds, contributing to the development of innovative bioproducts with high nutritional and functional value.

Her doctoral research at the Catholic University of Louvain examined enzymatic hydrolysis techniques for the extraction and stabilization of bioactive compounds from native Andean crops. This work laid the groundwork for her subsequent studies on functional foods and nutraceuticals.

She collaborates with other researchers in the Industrial Biotechnology and Bioprocesses Division of the Biotechnology Institute at National Agrarian University La Molina. This research group investigates various areas of food biotechnology and bioprocessing.

Her expertise includes the processing, extraction, purification, and characterization of bioactive compounds, including prebiotics, probiotics, antioxidants, polyphenols, glucosinolates, phytosterols, tocopherols, and high-intensity sweeteners.

Throughout her career, she has studied the antioxidant properties and potencial applications in the pharmaceutical and food industries of native Peruvian plants, such as sacha inchi, mashua, cañihua, kiwicha, and muña.

Since 2007, she has served as a professor at UNALM's Faculty of Food Industries, supervising over 50 undergraduate, master's, and doctoral theses.

== Publications ==
In 2003, she undertook her first research studies in collaboration with other investigators, resulting in the publication of a study on the nutritional benefits of yacón. This work served as a foundational milestone for her subsequent research on native Peruvian plants.

In 2017, she contributed to the book Advances in Food and Nutrition Research co-authoring the chapter "Bioactive Potential of Andean Fruits, Seeds, and Tubers". The chapter presents a comprehensive analysis of major Andean crops, including fruits such as lúcuma, cherimoya, pepino melon, and elderberry; roots and tubers such as potato, sweet potato, yacón, chicuru, mashua, and olluco; and seeds such as quinoa, amaranth, and tarwi. It examines their nutritional profiles and functional properties.

Her most recent publication, released in 2024, is titled "Conventional and ultrasound-assisted extractions of protein from sacha inchi (Plukenetia volubilis) and their impact on the physicochemical and structural characteristics". The study was developed in collaboration with her research team at the National Agrarian University La Molina.

== Awards and recognition ==
- National Assembly of Rectors (Peru): Recognition for outstanding scientific work and contributions to university research, awarded by the National Assembly of Rectors of Peru.
- L'Oréal-UNESCO "For Women in Science" Award (2014, Peru): Award granted by L'Oréal Peru, CONCYTEC, and the Peruvian National Commission for UNESCO, in recognition of excellence in scientific research and contributions to the country's academic field.
