= Identity theory =

Identity theory may refer to:

- Any of the theories of identity in philosophy;
- Cultural identity theory, in the social sciences;
- Identity Theory (webzine), a literary website;
- Identity theory of mind, a philosophical term;
- Personal identity, the unique numerical identity of a person over time;
- Pure identity theory, in logic;
- Social identity theory, in the social sciences.

== See also ==
- Identityism, is the school of Sufi metaphysics
