= Khokmanh =

Village in Laos

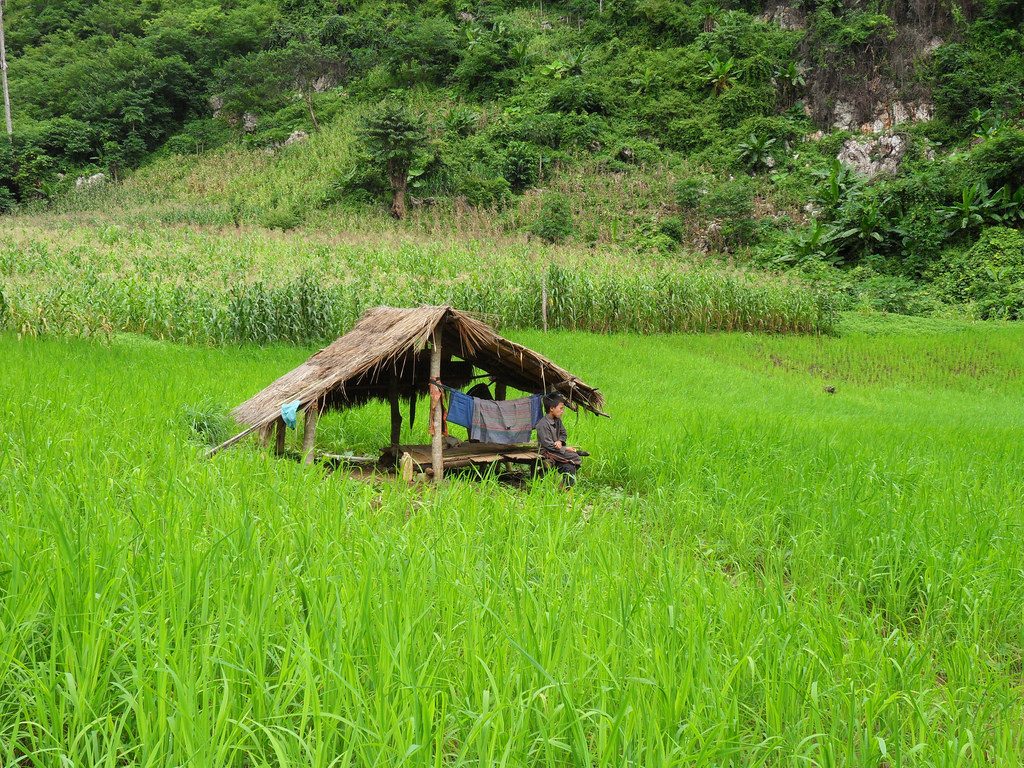
Paddy field of Khokmanh village.

Khokmanh or Ban Khokmanh is a village in Mueang Luang Prabang, Khoueng Luang Prabang in Laos.

== History ==
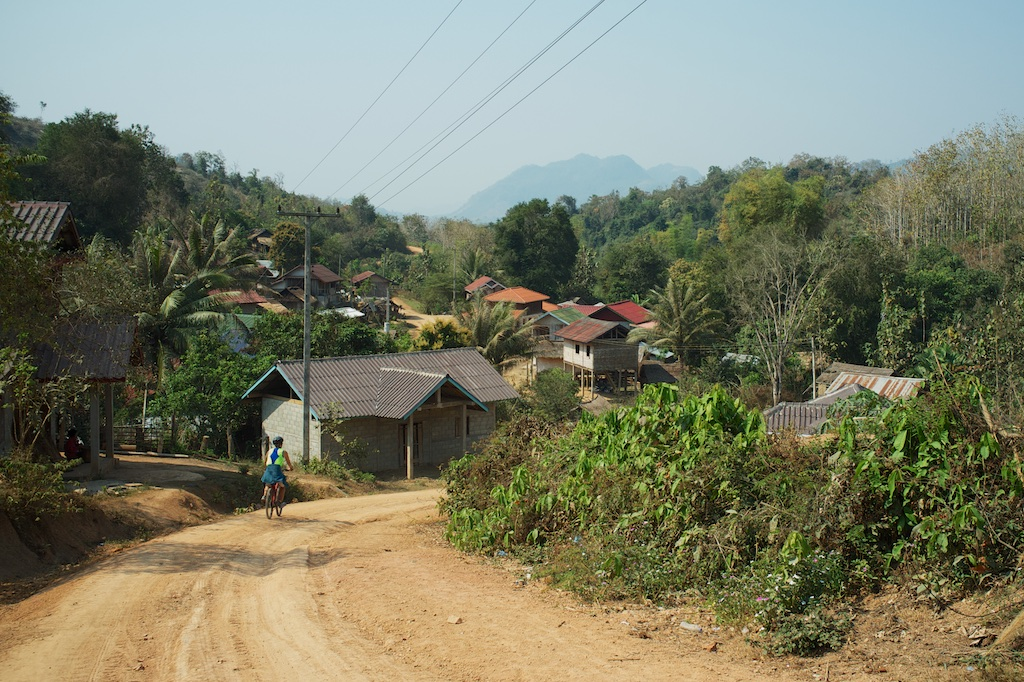
Road to Khokmanh village

Khokmanh village was established about 300 years ago. This area has lush paddy fields with fertile soil. From the 18th century, the Ho (Chinese Han) came here for wet rice cultivation. Therefore, this region has since then been called ‘Na Ho’, meaning, a rice field of the Ho. Then, the French came to add Luang Prabang and other parts of Laos into the French Protectorate of Laos. At that time Sen Kam was ‘Chau Lau’ or District Governor of this region. During that time, Khokmanh had only 10 families of the Lao or Lao Loum ethnic group. Around 1961, an additional 20 households from nearby came to live there. In 1995, under the Lao policy in merging small villages into the larger ones, an additional 11 families of the Khmu ethnic group moved from Huoi Nhai region to live with Lao Loum families in Khokmanh.

== Geography ==
Khokmanh is located in the Kuang Si watershed area which is a part of the Muong Khai Development Zone, about 27 km southwest from the Luang Prabang city. The village altitude is approximately 297 meters above sea level.

Khokmanh is bordered by Yang village 2,570 meters in the south, the Mekong River about 4,773 meters in the north; Pak Si village about 2,673 meters to the east, Thapene village about 2,978 meters in the east, and Noong Bua Kham village about 6,898 meters in the west. Khokmanh is located in between two streams creating the Kuang Si watershed, the Huoi Si and Huoi Sieu.

== Ethnicity and demography ==
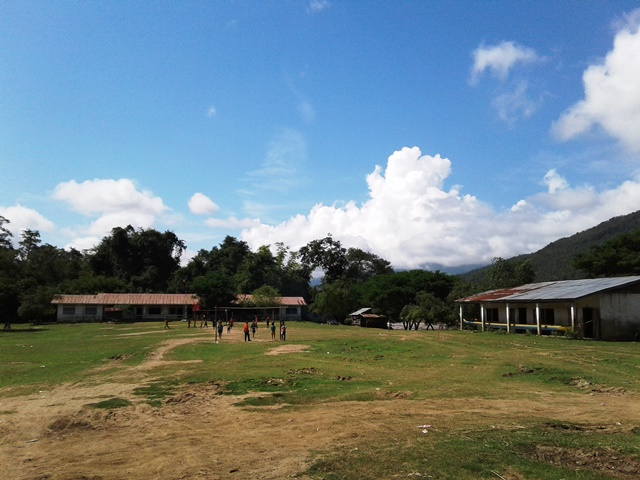
Primary school of Khokmanh village

In October 2016, Khokmanh village had 168 households of the Khmu and Lao Loum ethnic groups, including 975 people (539 females). Specifically, the Lao Loum had 157 households with 911 people (500 females); the Khmu has 11 households with 64 people (39 females). Totally, the village has 407 people at working age including 198 females. Villagers in Khokmanh are mostly engaging in traditional shifting cultivation and raising livestock.

== Culture and religion ==
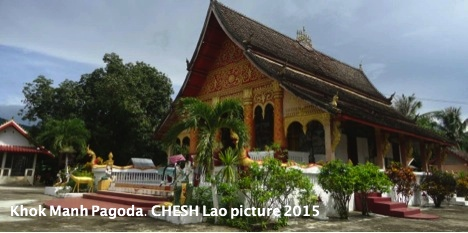
Khokmanh Wat

The ethnic groups in Khokmanh practice polytheistic religion. In addition to worshiping Buddha in Wat, they have formed and maintained community spirit forests as Lac Ban - worshiping Village's Spirit, Khet Huoi Nhap as village cemetery, Phu Long as Coffin Mount, Phu Ho as spirit forest of the Khmu families who used to live in Huoi Nhai village, Phu Sot, Phu Vieng as well as community use forests such as Phu Nhon, Phu Kheo Khan Thung and Phu Mac Ca.

Since 2016, Luang Prabang district and provincial authorities, in consultation with Social Policy Ecology Research Institute - SPERI and with support of CCFD-Terre Solidaire, have conducted community based forest and land allocation for Khokmanh. The aim is to promote sustainable usage and management of community forest and land resources, as well as preserving the cultural identity of the ethnic groups not only in Khokmanh but also in the entire Kuang Si upper catchment including districts of Luang Prabang, Mueang Nan and Xieng Ngeun of Luang Prabang province.

Accordingly, at first the entire Khokmanh traditional territory, including 1,768.25 hectares of different categories of forest and land were measured and legitimized. This includes 400.65 hectares of agricultural land (400.19 arable land and paddy crops, and 0.46 hectares of fish ponds), 1,350.48 hectares of forestland (356.48 hectares of water protection forest, 307.3 hectares of strictly preserved forest, 481.26 ha of family regenerated forest after shifting cultivation and 205.21 hectares of community use forest). Furthermore, a set of paper official maps and e-maps regarding the status and planning of Khokmanh forest land on the basis of local knowledge have been established. The traditional boundary of the Khokmanh territory with neighboring villages is defined and governed under the inter-villages regulation which is based on participatory community customary law and statutory law.
