= Ban Yang =

Ban Yang is the name of:

- Ban Yang (Laos), a village
- Ban Yang, Thailand, several places; see List of tambon in Thailand – B
  - Ban Yang, Phitsanulok, a subdistrict in the Wat Bot District of Phitsanulok Province, Thailand

== See also ==
- Ban Yaeng, a subdistrict in the Nakhon Thai District of Phitsanulok Province, Thailand
