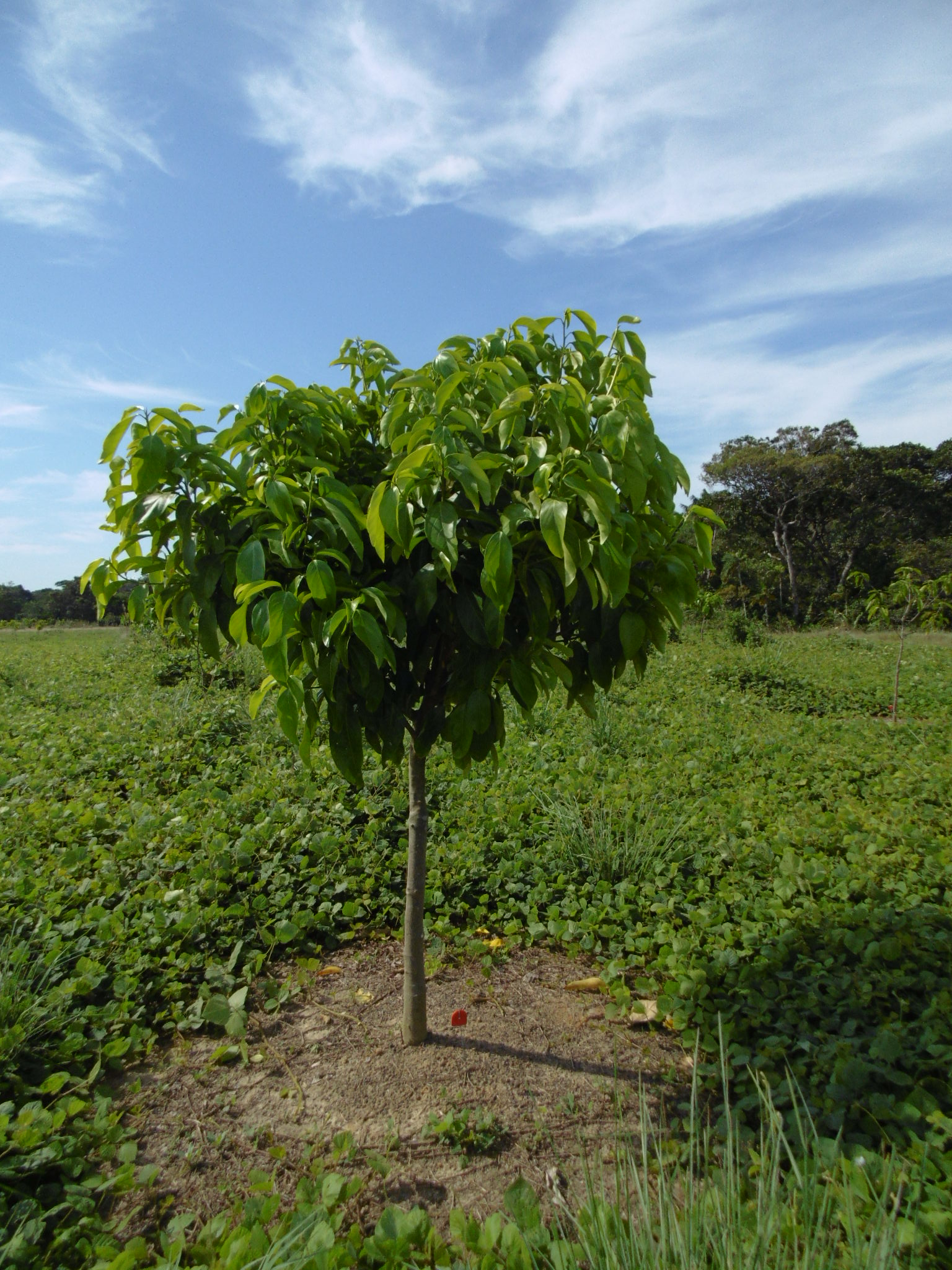
- Caryodendron orinocense in Colombia

Scientific classification
- Kingdom: Plantae
- Clade: Tracheophytes
- Clade: Angiosperms
- Clade: Eudicots
- Clade: Rosids
- Order: Malpighiales
- Family: Euphorbiaceae
- Subfamily: Acalyphoideae
- Tribe: Caryodendreae
- Genus: Caryodendron; H.Karst.

Type species
- Caryodendron orinocense H.Karst.

Synonyms
- Centrodiscus Müll.Arg.

= Caryodendron =

Genus of plants

Caryodendron is a plant genus of the family Euphorbiaceae first described as a genus in 1860. The genus includes C. orinocense, known as the Inchi tree or Tacay nut. It is native to Central America and South America. They are dioecious trees.

Species

1. Caryodendron amazonicum Ducke - Amazonas in Brazil
2. Caryodendron angustifolium Standl. - Costa Rica, Panama, Colombia
3. Caryodendron janeirense Müll.Arg. - Rio de Janeiro
4. Caryodendron orinocense H.Karst - Colombia, Venezuela, Ecuador
