= Ban Thapene =

Village of Luang Prabang District

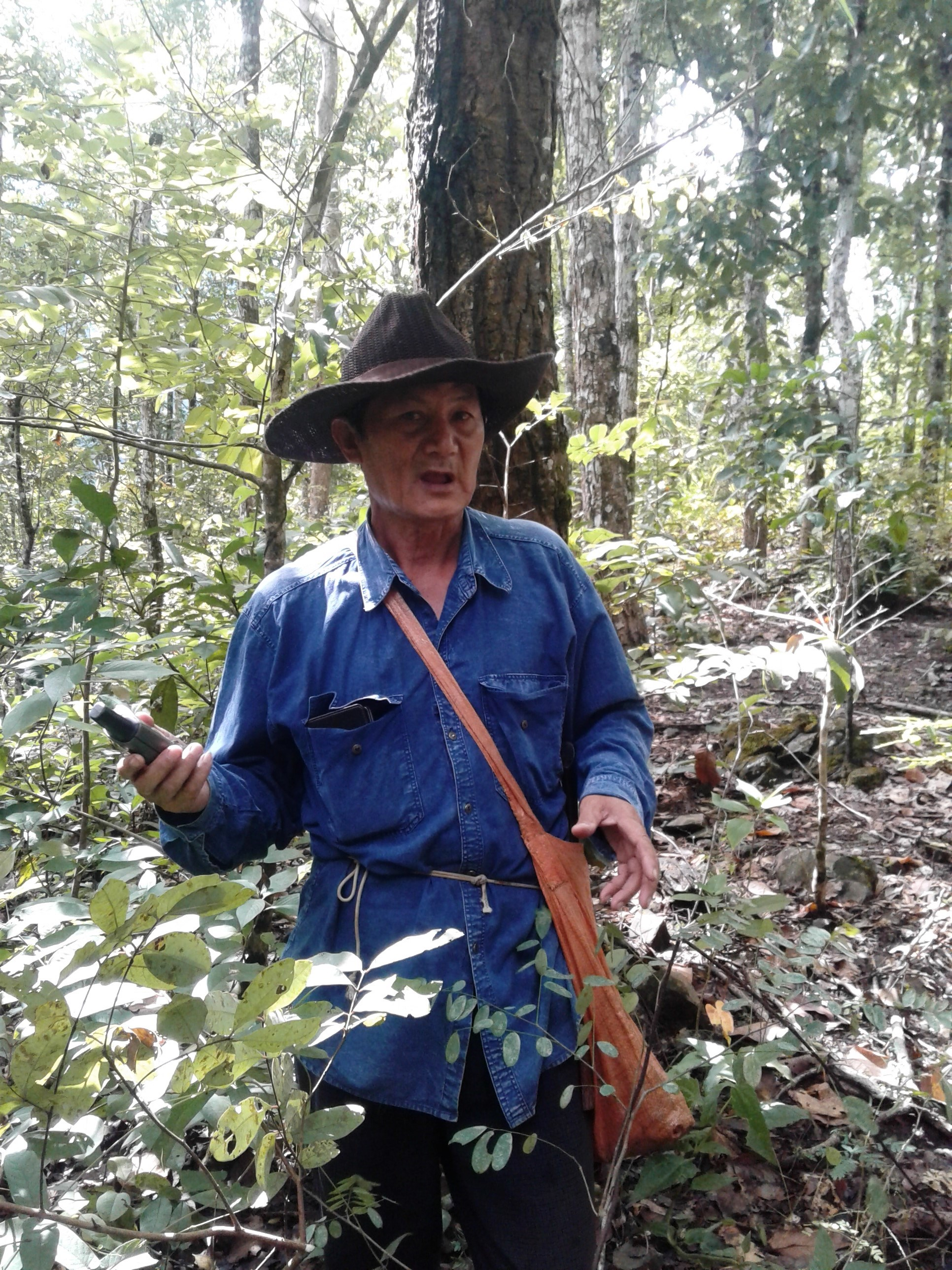
Ban Thapene villager on forest patrol

Ban Thapene is a village of Luang Prabang District, Luang Prabang Province, Laos. The village was first established about 130 years ago by Kha Hok families, one of the Khmu ethnic sub-groups. Like many other upland inhabitants in Luang Prabang, the livelihood and culture of ethnic groups such as Lao Loum, Kha Hok, Yao and Hmong in Ban Thapene is dependent on natural resources.

== Geography ==
Ban Thapene is about 29 kilometers southwest of Luang Prabang. The topography of Ban Thapene is composed of mountains, small valleys, streams and waterfalls with elevations ranging between 450–930 metres. The village is adjacent to Ban U and Nong Heo villages to the north, Ban Khokmanh and Pa Si villages to the west, Ban Yang village to the south and Long Lao Kau and Long Lao May villages to the east.

== Ethnicity and demography ==
Ban Thapene is home to groups such as Lao Loum, Kha Hok, Yao and Hmong. In December 2016, Ban Thapene had 139 households with 637 persons, in which Kha Hok and Lao Loum were the majority.

== Natural resources ==
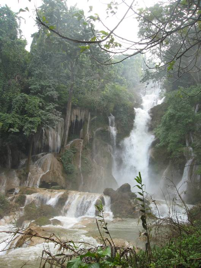
The Kuang Si Waterfall, Ban Thapene

Total natural area of Ban Thapene which was legitimized by local authorities with support of SPERI and CCFD in 2016 is approximately 1,775.59 hectares. This area includes different categories of forest and land, e.g., community spirit preserve forestland, community protected forestland, community and family usage forestland, agricultural land, housing and infrastructure land (e.g., primary school, clinic and wat), tourism land, and military land.

Ban Thapene has an inter-connection of groundwater, small streams and waterfall. The 60 meter-high Kuang Si Fall is a part of the Huoi Si stream, which has its source in the Phu Nam Ork Mount in the Luang Prabang Range. The Huoi Si stream flows through Nam Uok and Thapene villages before flowing into the Mekong River.

Natural resources, notably forests play a vital role to the material and spiritual values of the ethnic groups in Ban Thapene. Forest and land, especially the spirit forests like Nam Ork Mount and Hua Tat Mount, are spaces for ethnic groups in Ban Thapene to practice their customary beliefs via yearly and seasonal ceremonies to worship the nature spirit. Ban Thapene has established its community regulation based on customary law and government policies in order to preserve such livelihood and cultural sites for future generations.

== Economy ==
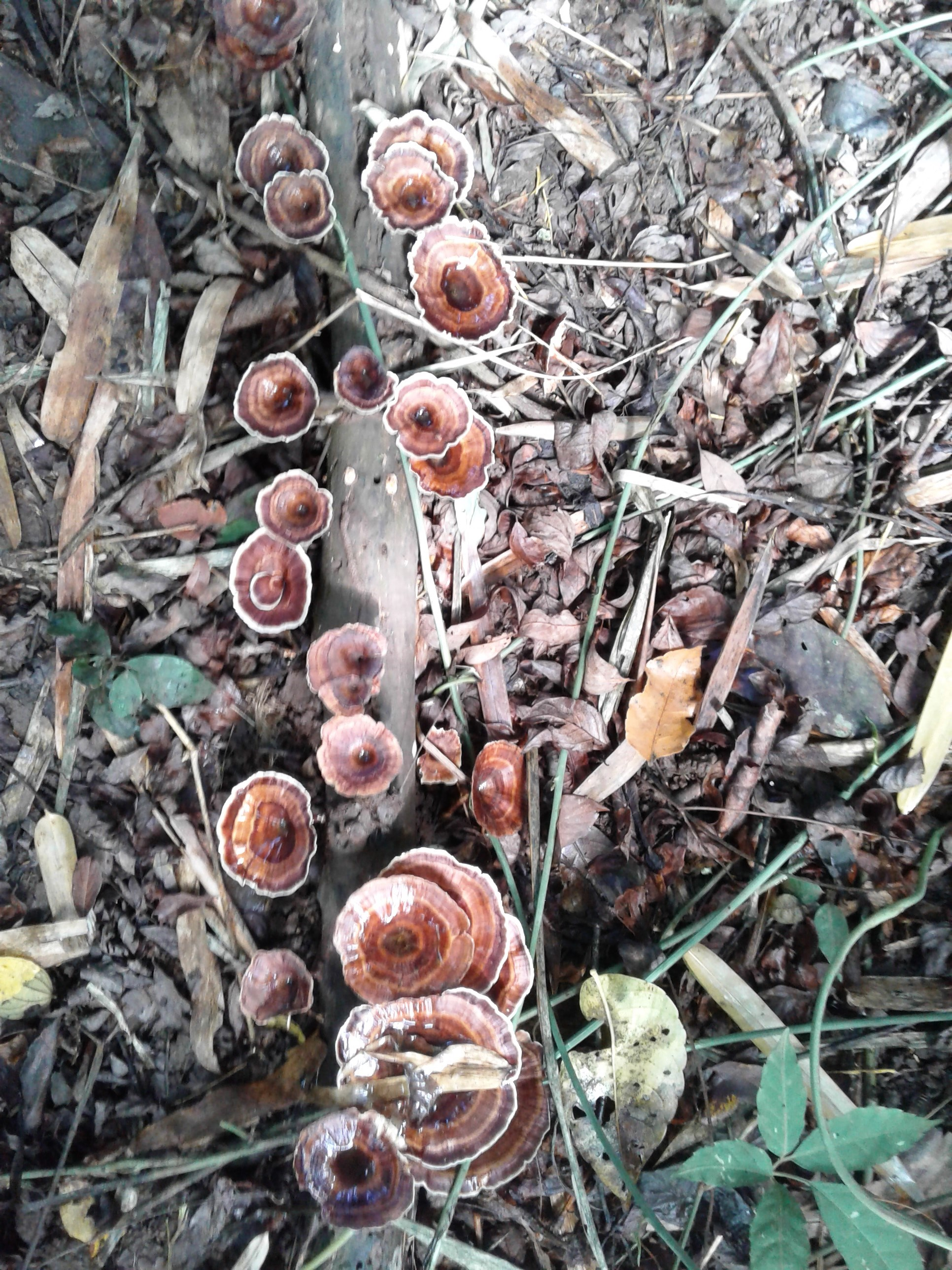
Wild mushrooms used by villagers to make herbal medicine, Ban Thapene

Before 1994, the livelihood of families in Ban Thapene was largely based on natural resources, upland farming or rotational shifting cultivation, planting wet rice, raising cows and buffalo, and collecting non-timber forest products. Afterward, because of the Lao policy of banning shifting cultivation and establishing protected areas to preserve the Kuang Si watershed and develop the Kuang Si tourism area, traditional practices have been partly converted to small-scale tourism services near the Kuang Si Falls. By 2014, some families in Ban Thapene still keep plots for farming. Ban Thapene plans these plots into the community managed area for agricultural production. Besides the regular income generated from tourism services, villagers also make items, e.g., traditional brocade, clothing, baskets, and wooden arts for selling as souvenirs to tourists. These products are largely made from non-timber forest products collected from community use forests and family forests after the fallow period.
