= Cultural identity =

Identity or feeling of belonging to a group

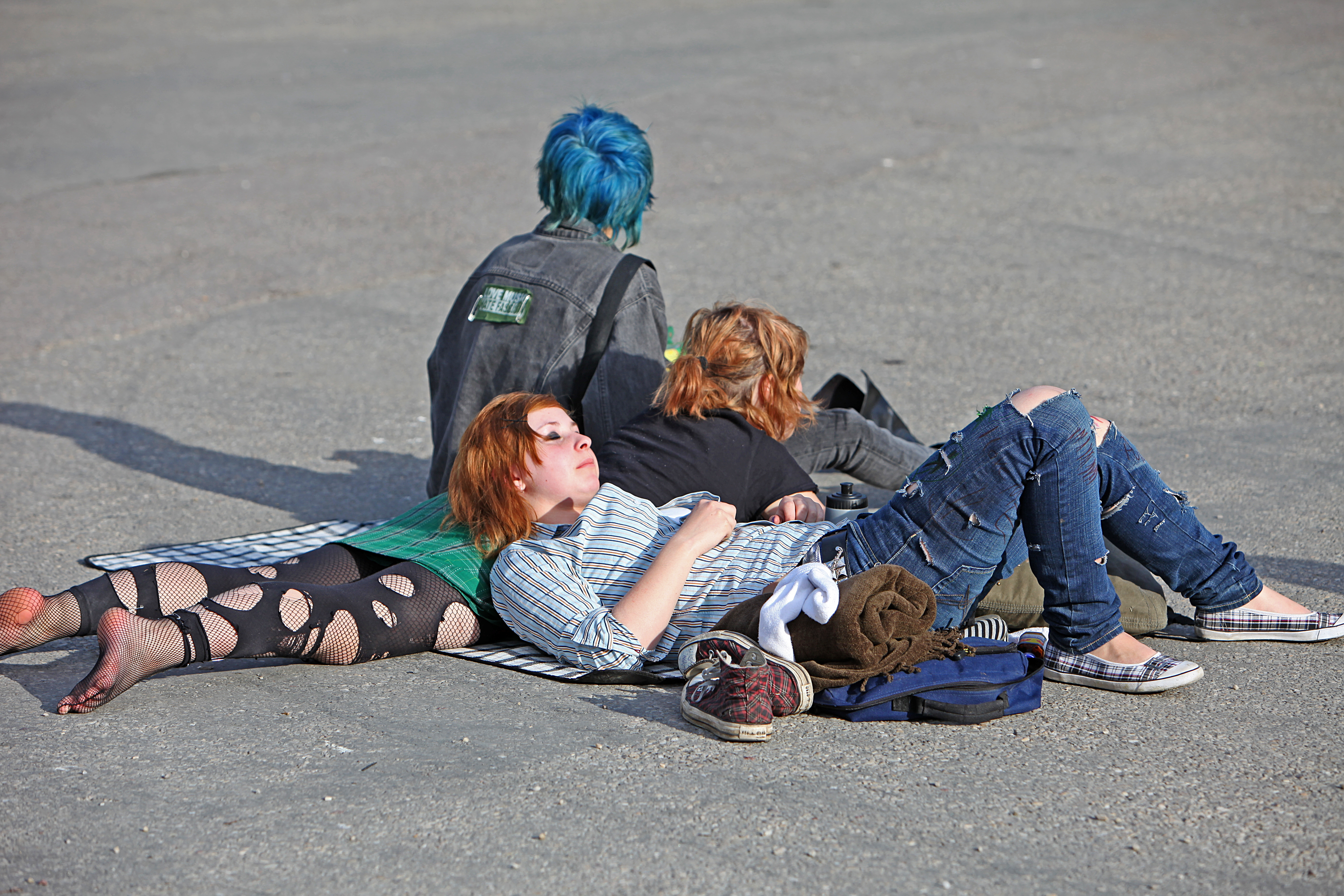
Cultural identity can be expressed through certain styles of clothing or other aesthetic markers.

Cultural identity is a part of a person's identity, or their self-conception and self-perception, and is related to nationality, ethnicity, religion, social class, generation, locality, gender, or any kind of social group that has its own distinct culture. In this way, cultural identity is both characteristic of the individual but also of the culturally identical group of members sharing the same cultural identity or upbringing. Cultural identity is an unfixed process that is continually evolving within the discourses of social, cultural, and historical experiences. Some people undergo more cultural identity changes as opposed to others, those who change less often have a clear cultural identity. This means that they have a dynamic yet stable integration of their culture.

There are three pieces that make up a person's cultural identity: cultural knowledge, category label, and social connections. Cultural knowledge refers to a person's connection to their identity through understanding their culture's core characteristics. Category label refers to a person's connection to their identity through indirect membership of said culture. Social connections refers to a person's connection to their identity through their social relationships. Cultural identity is developed through a series of steps. First, a person comes to understand a culture through being immersed in those values, beliefs, and practices. Second, the person then identifies as a member of that culture dependent on their rank within that community. Third, they develop relationships such as immediate family, close friends, coworkers, and neighbors.

Culture is a term that is highly complex and often contested, with academics recording about 160 variations in meaning. Underpinning the notion of culture is that it is dynamic and changes over time and in different contexts resulting in many people today identifying with one or more cultures and many different ways.

It is a defining feature of a person's identity, contributing to how they see themselves and the groups with which they identify. A person's understanding of their own and other's identities develops from birth and is shaped by the values and attitudes prevalent at home and in the surrounding community.

== Description ==
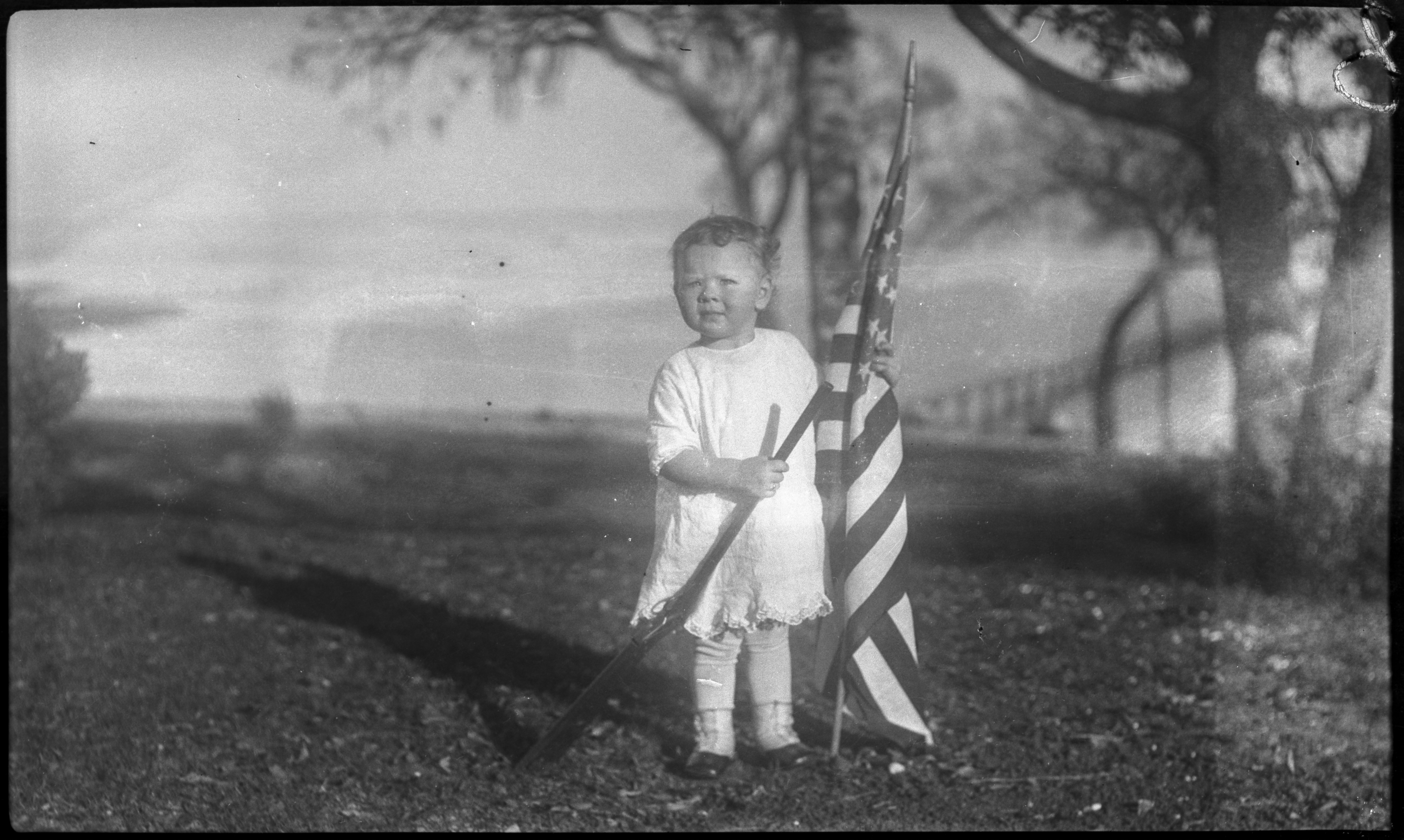
Child with flag and a firearm

Various modern cultural studies and social theories have investigated cultural identity and understanding. In recent decades, a new form of identification has emerged that breaks down the understanding of the individual as a coherent whole subject into a collection of various cultural identifiers. These cultural identifiers may be the result of various conditions including: location, sex, race, history, nationality, language, sexuality, religious beliefs, ethnicity, aesthetics, and food. As one author writes:

When talking about identity, we generally define this word as the series of physical features that differentiate a person. Thus at birth, our parents declare us and give us a name with which they will identify us based on whether we are a boy or a girl. Identity is not only a right that declares the name, sex, time, and place that one is born; the word identity goes beyond what we define it. Identity is a function of elements that portrays one in a dynamic way, in constant evolution, throughout the stages of life identity develops based on personal experiences, tastes, and choices of a sexual and religious nature, as well as the social environment, these being some of the main parameters that influence and transform the day to day and allow us to discover a new part of ourselves.

Categorizations about identity, even when codified and hardened into clear typologies by processes of colonization, state formation, or general modernizing processes, are always full of tensions and contradictions. Sometimes these contradictions are destructive, but they can also be creative and positive

The divisions between cultures can be very fine in some parts of the world, especially in rapidly changing cities where the population is ethnically diverse and social unity is based primarily on locational contiguity.

As a "historical reservoir," culture is an important factor in shaping identity. Since one of the main characteristics of a culture is its "historical reservoir," many if not all groups entertain revisions, either consciously or unconsciously, in their historical record in order to either bolster the strength of their cultural identity or to forge one which gives them precedent for actual reform or change. Some critics of cultural identity argue that the preservation of cultural identity, being based upon difference, is a divisive force in society and that cosmopolitanism gives individuals a greater sense of shared citizenship. When considering practical association in international society, states may share an inherent part of their 'make up' that gives common ground and an alternative means of identifying with each other. Nations provide the framework for cultural identities called external cultural reality, which influences the unique internal cultural realities of the individuals within the nation.

There is a relationship between cultural identity and new media.

Rather than necessarily representing an individual's interaction within a certain group, cultural identity may be defined by the social network of people imitating and following the social norms as presented by the media. Accordingly, instead of learning behavior and knowledge from cultural/religious groups, individuals may be learning these social norms from the media to build on their cultural identity.

A range of cultural complexities structures the way individuals operate with the cultural realities in their lives. Nation is a large factor of the cultural complexity, as it constructs the foundation for an individual's identity, but it may contrast with one's cultural reality. Cultural identities are influenced by several different factors such as ones religion, ancestry, skin color, language, class, education, profession, skill, family and political attitudes. These factors contribute to the development of one's identity.

== History ==
The history of cultural identity develops out of the observations of a number of social scientists. A history of cultural identity is important because it outlines the understanding of how our identities provide a way to see ourselves in relation to the world in which we live. "Cultural identities...are the natural, and most fundamental, constitutive elements of individual and collective identity."

Franz Boas is an important figure in the creation of the idea of cultural identity. Boas is known for challenging ideas about culture. Boas promoted the importance of viewing a culture from within its own perspective and understanding, not from the outsider's view point. This was a somewhat radical perspective at the time. Additionally, Myron Lustig is credited with contributing the concept of cultural identity theory.

A number of contemporary theorists continue to contribute to the concept of cultural identity. For instance, contemporary work completed by Stuart Hall is considered essential to understand cultural identity. According to Hall, identity is defined by at least two specific actions, which are similarity and difference. Specifically, in settings of slavery and colonization, identity provides a connection to the past as well as disintegration from a shared origination.

Theorists' questions about identity include "whether identity is to be understood as something internal that persists through change or as something ascribed from without that changes according to circumstance." Whatever the case may be, Gleason advocates for "sensitivity to the intrinsic complexities of the subject matter with which it deals, and careful attention to the need for precision and consistency in its application. Cultural identity can also become a marker of difference that requires sensitivity.

Kuper presents concepts on cultural identity within the framework of a power dynamic. He writes, "The privileged lie and mislead, but the oppressed come gradually to appreciate their objective circumstances and formulate a new consciousness that will ultimately liberate them." The consciousness is a facet of their identity. Similarly, identity plays a role in mediating between a human being and the environment in which they exist.

The identity of a person is "a result of socialization and customs" that promotes the maintenance of distinct cultural identities from generation to generation. Additionally, identity can be considered that which forms cultures and results in "dictated appropriate behavior." Put another way, identity may dictate behavior that results in the reification of identity with the individual as a "replicate in miniature of the larger social and cultural entity. Another way to consider cultural identity is that it is "the sum of material wealth and spiritual wealth created by human beings in the practice of social history."

Globalization is connected to influences in economics, politics, and society. Accordingly, globalization has an impact on cultural identity. As societies become even more connected, there are concerns that cultural identities will become homogenized through the increased level of connection and communication. However, there are alternative perspectives on this issue. For instance, Wright theorizes that "The spread of global culture and globalised ideas has led to many movements designed to embrace the uniqueness and diversity of an individual's particular culture."

== Cultural arena ==
It is also noted that an individual's "cultural arena," or place where one lives, impacts the culture that person abides by. The surroundings, environment, and people in these places play a role in how one feels about the culture they wish to adopt. Many immigrants find the need to change their culture in order to fit into the culture of most citizens in the country. This can conflict with an immigrant's current belief in their culture and might pose a problem, as the immigrant feels compelled to choose between the two presenting cultures.

Some might be able to adjust to the various cultures in the world by committing to two or more cultures. It is not required to stick to one culture. Many people socialize and interact with people in one culture in addition to another group of people in another culture. Thus, cultural identity is able to take many forms and can change depending on the cultural area. The impact of the cultural arena has changed with the advent of the Internet, bringing together groups of people with shared cultural interests who before would have been more likely to integrate into their real-world cultural arena. This adaptability is what allows people to feel a part of society and culture wherever they go.

== Language ==
Language allows for people in a group to communicate their values, beliefs, and customs, all of which contribute to creating a cultural identity. It was for a long time believed that if children lose their languages, they lose part or all of their cultural identity. When students who are non-native English speakers, go to classes where they are required to speak only English, they feel that their native language has no value. Some studies found, that this leads to loss of their culture and language altogether and this can lead to either a massive change in cultural identity, or they find themselves struggling to understand who they are. Language also includes the way people speak with peers, family members, authority figures, and strangers, including the tone and familiarity that is included in the language. The learning process can also be affected by cultural identity via the understanding of specific words, and the preference for specific words when learning and using a second language. Since many aspects of a person's cultural identity can be changed, such as citizenship or influence from outside cultures, language is a major component of cultural identity. However, more recent research could show, that language may be not a crucial part of a person's identity or cultural identity.

== Education ==
Cultural identity is often not discussed in the classroom or learning environment where an instructor presides over the class. This often happens when the instructor attempts to discuss cultural identity and the issues that come with it in the classroom and is met with disagreement and cannot make forward progress in the conversation. Moreover, not talking about cultural identity can lead to issues such as prohibiting growth of education, development of a sense of self, and social competency. In these environments there are often many different cultures and problems can occur due to different worldviews that prevent others from being able to think outwardly about their peers' values and differing backgrounds. If students are able to think outwardly, then they can not only better connect with their peers, but also further develop their own worldview. In addition to this, instructors should take into account the needs of different students' backgrounds in order to best relay the material in a way that engages the student.

When students learn that knowledge and truth are relevant to each person, that instructors do not know everything, and that their own personal experiences dictate what they believe they can better contextualize new information using their own experiences as well as taking into account the different cultural experiences of others. This in turn increases the ability to critically think and challenge new information which benefits all students learning in a classroom setting. There are two ways instructors can better elicit this response from their students through active communication of cultural identity. The first is by having students engage in class discussion with their peers. Doing so creates community and allows for students to share their knowledge as well as question their peers and instructors, thereby, learning about each other's cultural identity and creating acceptance of differing worldviews in the classroom. The second way is by using active learning methods such as "forming small groups and analyzing case studies". Through engaging in active learning students learn that their cultural identity is welcomed and accepted.

== Cultural identity and immigrant experience ==
Identity development among immigrant groups has been studied across a multi-dimensional view of acculturation. Acculturation is the phenomenon that results when groups or individuals from different cultures come into continuous contact with one another and adopt certain values and practices that were not originally their own. Acculturation is unique from assimilation. Dina Birman and Edison Trickett (2001) conducted a qualitative study through informal interviews with first-generation Soviet Jewish refugee adolescents looking at the process of acculturation through three different dimensions: language competence, behavioral acculturation, and cultural identity. The results indicated that "acculturation appears to occur in a linear pattern over time for most dimensions of acculturation, with acculturation to the American culture increasing and acculturation to the Russian culture decreasing. However, Russian language competence for the parents did not diminish with length of residence in the country" (Birman & Trickett, 2001).

In a similar study, Phinney, Horencyzk, Liebkind, and Vedder (2001) focused on a model, which concentrates on the interaction between immigrant characteristics and the responses of the majority society to understand the psychological effects of immigration. The researchers concluded that most studies find that being bicultural, the combination of a strong ethnic and a strong national identity, yields the best adaptation in the new country of residence. An article by LaFromboise, L. K. Colemna, and Gerton, reviews the literature on the impact of being bicultural. It showed that it is possible to have the ability to obtain competence within two cultures without losing one's sense of identity or having to identity with one culture over the other. (LaFromboise Et Al. 1993) The importance of ethnic and national identity in the educational adaptation of immigrants indicates that a bicultural orientation is advantageous for school performance (Portes & Rumbaut, 1990). Educators can assume their positions of power in beneficially impactful ways for immigrant students, by providing them with access to their native cultural support groups, language classes, after-school activities, and clubs in order to help them feel more connected to both native and national cultures. It is clear that the new country of residence can impact immigrants' identity development across multiple dimensions. Biculturalism can allow for a healthy adaptation to life and school. With many new immigrant youth, a school district in Alberta, Canada, has gone as far as to partner with various agencies and professionals in an effort to aid the cultural adjustment of new Filipino immigrant youths. In the study cited, a combination of family workshops and teacher professional development aimed to improve the language learning and emotional development of these youths and families.

== School transitions ==
How great is "Achievement Loss Associated with the Transition to Middle School and High School"? John W. Alspaugh's research is in the September/October 1998 Journal of Educational Research (vol. 92, no. 1), 2026. Comparing three groups of 16 school districts, the loss was greater where the transition was from sixth grade than from a K-8 system. It was also greater when students from multiple elementary schools merged into a single middle school. Students from both K-8 and middle schools lost achievement in transition to high school, though this was greater for middle school students, and high school dropout rates were higher for districts with grades 6-8 middle schools than for those with K-8 elementary schools.

The Jean S. Phinney Three-Stage Model of Ethnic Identity Development is a widely accepted view of the formation of cultural identity. In this model cultural Identity is often developed through a three-stage process: unexamined cultural identity, cultural identity search, and cultural identity achievement.

Unexamined cultural identity: "a stage where one's cultural characteristics are taken for granted, and consequently there is little interest in exploring cultural issues." This for example is the stage one is in throughout their childhood when one doesn't distinguish between cultural characteristics of their household and others. Usually, a person in this stage accepts the ideas they find on culture from their parents, the media, community, and others.

An example of thought in this stage: "I don't have a culture I'm just an American." "My parents tell me about where they lived, but what do I care? I've never lived there."

Cultural identity search: "is the process of exploration and questioning about one's culture in order to learn more about it and to understand the implications of membership in that culture." During this stage a person will begin to question why they hold their beliefs and compare it to the beliefs of other cultures. For some this stage may arise from a turning point in their life or from a growing awareness of other cultures. This stage is characterized by growing awareness in social and political forums and a desire to learn more about culture. This can be expressed by asking family members questions about heritage, visiting museums, reading of relevant cultural sources, enrolling in school courses, or attendance at cultural events. This stage might have an emotional component as well.

An example of thought in this stage: "I want to know what we do and how our culture is different from others." "There are a lot of non-Japanese people around me, and it gets pretty confusing to try and decide who I am."

Cultural identity achievement: "is characterized by a clear, confident acceptance of oneself and an internalization of one's cultural identity." In this stage people often allow the acceptance of their cultural identity play a role in their future choices such as how to raise children, how to deal with stereotypes and any discrimination and approach negative perceptions. This usually leads to an increase in self-confidence and positive psychological adjustment.

There is a set of phenomena that occur in conjunction between virtual culture – understood as the modes and norms of behavior associated with the internet and the online world – and youth culture. While we can speak of a duality between the virtual (online) and real sphere (face-to-face relations), for youth, this frontier is implicit and permeable. On occasions – to the annoyance of parents and teachers – these spheres are even superposed, meaning that young people may be in the real world without ceasing to be connected.

In the present techno-cultural context, the relationship between the real world and the virtual world cannot be understood as a link between two independent and separate worlds, possibly coinciding at a point, but as a Moebius strip where there exists no inside and outside and where it is impossible to identify limits between both. For new generations, to an ever-greater extent, digital life merges with their home life as yet another element of nature. In this naturalizing of digital life, the learning processes from that environment are frequently mentioned not just since they are explicitly asked but because the subject of the internet comes up spontaneously among those polled. The ideas of active learning, of googling 'when you don't know', of recourse to tutorials for learning a program or a game, or the expression 'I learnt English better and in a more entertaining way by playing' are examples often cited as to why the internet is the place most frequented by the young people polled.

The internet is becoming an extension of the expressive dimension of the youth condition. There, youth talk about their lives and concerns, design the content that they make available to others and assess others' reactions to it in the form of optimized and electronically mediated social approval. Many of today's youth go through processes of affirmation procedures and is often the case for how youth today grow dependent on peer approval. When connected, youth speak of their daily routines and lives. With each post, image or video they upload, they have the possibility of asking themselves who they are and to try out profiles differing from those they assume in the 'real' world. The connections they feel in more recent times have become much less interactive through personal means compared to past generations. The influx of new technology and access has created new fields of research on effects on teens and young adults. They thus negotiate their identity and create senses of belonging, putting the acceptance and censure of others to the test, an essential mark of the process of identity construction.

Youth ask themselves about what they think of themselves, how they see themselves personally and, especially, how others see them. On the basis of these questions, youth make decisions which, through a long process of trial and error, shape their identity. This experimentation is also a form through which they can think about their insertion, membership and sociability in the 'real' world.

From other perspectives, the question arises on what impact the internet has had on youth through accessing this sort of 'identity laboratory' and what role it plays in the shaping of youth identity. On the one hand, the internet enables young people to explore and perform various roles and personifications while on the other, the virtual forums – some of them highly attractive, vivid and absorbing (e.g. video games or virtual games of personification) – could present a risk to the construction of a stable and viable personal identity.

== See also ==
- Collective identity
- Conflict theories
- Cultural diversity
- Cultural identity theory
- Diaspora politics
- Globalization
- Human rights education
- Intercultural competence
- Multiculturalism
- Nationalism
- Need for affiliation
- Pan-nationalism
- Place identity
- Pluralism
- Progressive politics
- Self-concept
- Self-determination
- Self-discovery
- Social identity
- Social identity theory
- Transculturation

== Sources ==
This article incorporates text from a free content work. Licensed under CC-BY-SA IGO 3.0 (license statement/permission). Text taken from Youth and changing realities: rethinking secondary education in Latin America, 44-45, López, Néstor; Opertti, Renato; Vargas Tamez, Carlos, UNESCO. UNESCO.

== Sources ==
- Gad Barzilai, Communities and Law: Politics and Cultures of Legal Identities University of Michigan Press, 2003. ISBN 978-0-472-03079-8
- Tan, S.-h. (2005). Challenging citizenship: group membership and cultural identity in a global age. Aldershot, Hants, England: Ashgate. ISBN 0-7546-4367-0
- Bunschoten, R., Binet, H., & Hoshino, T. (2001). Urban flotsam: stirring the city : Chora. Rotterdam: 010 Publishers. ISBN 90-6450-387-7
- Mandelbaum, M. (2000). The new European diasporas: national minorities and conflict in Eastern Europe. New York: Council on Foreign Relations Press
- Houtman, G. (1999). Mental culture in Burmese crisis politics: Aung San Suu Kyi and the National League for Democracy. Tokyo: Institute for the Study of Languages and Cultures of Asia and Africa, Tokyo University of Foreign Studies. (library.cornell.edu). ISBN 4-87297-748-3
- Sagasti, F. R., & Alcalde, G. (1999). Development cooperation in a fractured global order: an arduous transition. Ottawa: International Development Research Centre. ISBN 0-88936-889-9
- Crahan, M. E., & Vourvoulias-Bush, A. (1997). The city and the world: New York's global future. New York: Council on Foreign relations. ISBN 0-87609-208-3
- Hall, S., & Du Gay, P. (1996). Questions of cultural identity. London: Sage. ISBN 0-8039-7883-9
- Cable, V. (1994). The world's new fissures: identities in crisis. London: Demos. ISBN 1-898309-35-3
- Berkson, I. B. (1920).Theories of Americanization a critical study, with special reference to the Jewish group. New York City: Teachers College, Columbia University.
- Mora, Necha. (2008).
