= Ban Yang (Laos) =

Village in Laos

Coordinates: 19°42′1.2″N 101°57′25.5″E

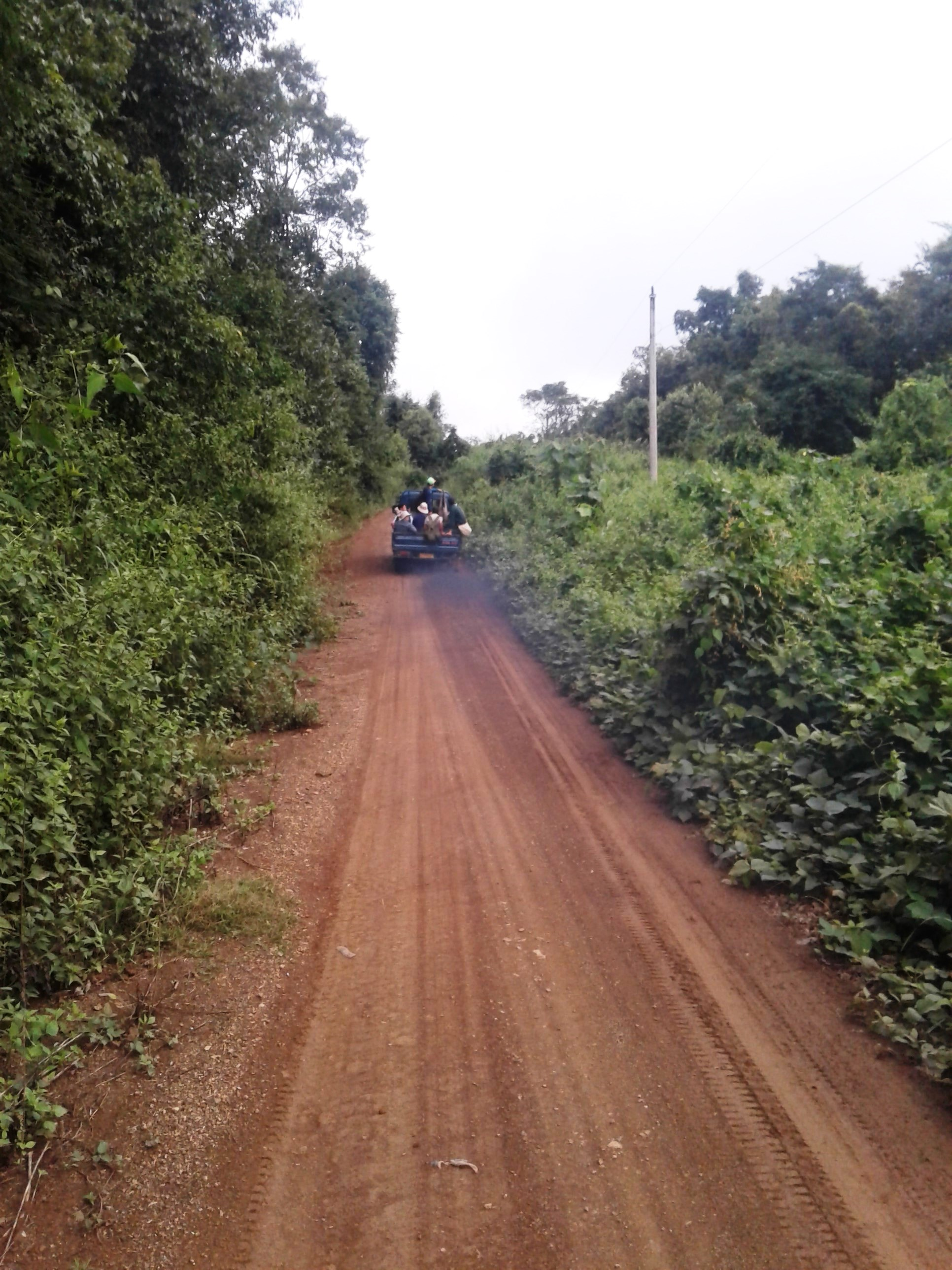
Road to Ban Yang

Ban Yang is a village in Luang Prabang district, Luang Prabang province, Laos. It was established around 1935 by Lao Loum ethnic group who used to live in Ban Pha Quang village in Phu Phang Mountain. Ban Pha Quang village is 20 kilometers northeast from Mueang Nan district, Luang Prabang province. When they arrived, they saw this region had immense forested mountain, fertile land, abundant water source in the Huoi Sieu stream, and was convenient for living and farming. They also discovered a big tree with its roots crossing the Huoi Sieu stream like a bridge. The tree root that later was named as Yang, means 'crossing the stream'. Since then, people have called this village Ban Yang.

== Geography ==
Ban Yang is about 45 kilometers south of Luang Prabang city. The village lies at an average altitude of 410 meters above sea level. In November 2016, Luang Prabang district authority and Office of Agriculture and Forestry (DAFO) with the support of SPERI and CCFD legitimized the traditional territory of about 5,300 hectares for Ban Yang. This territory is characterized by diverse topographies such as hill, high mountain, stream and valley. Specially, it includes different spirit forestlands and rich tropical forest located in the upper catchment of the Kuang Si Waterfall.

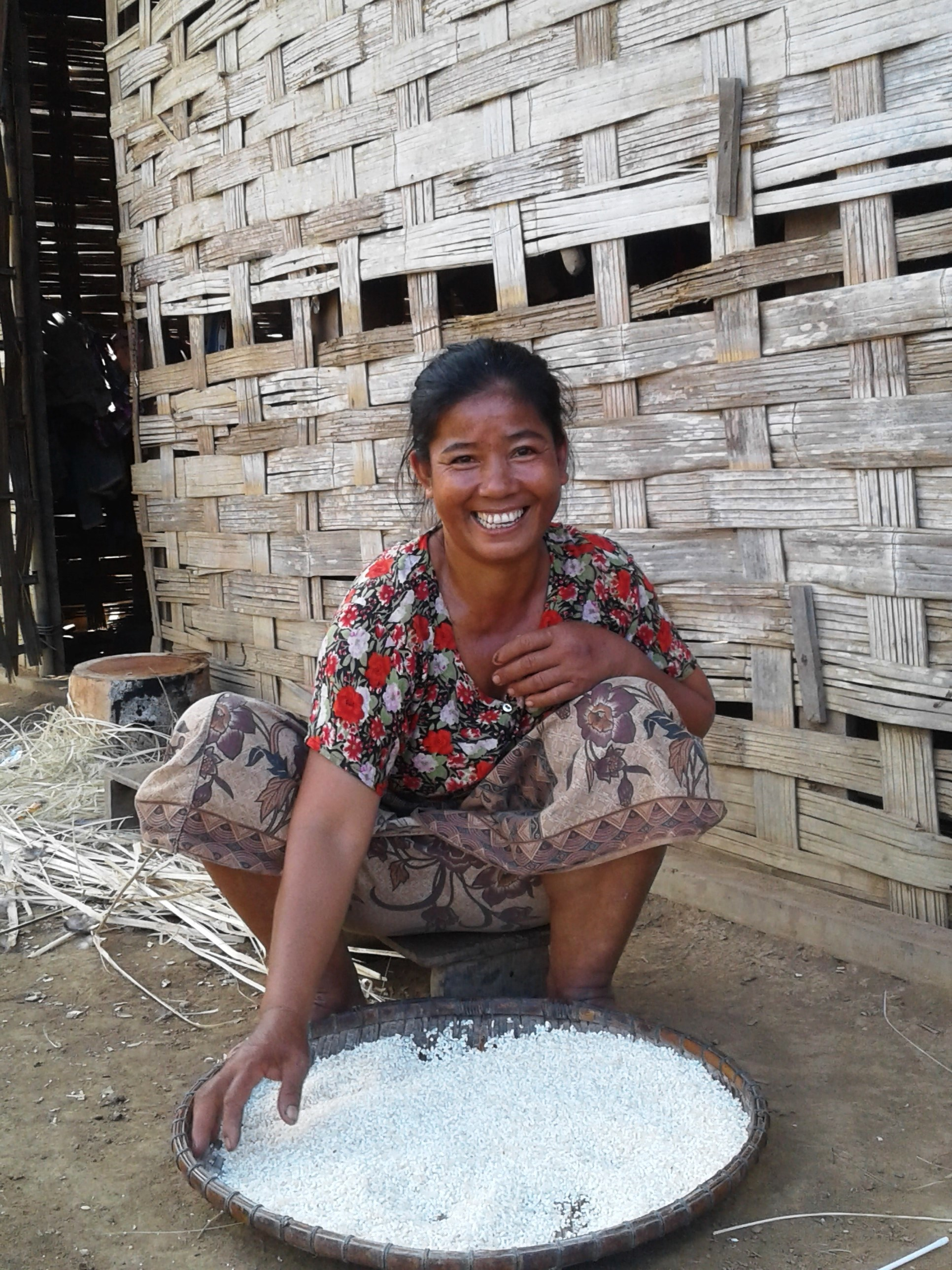
A woman in Ban Yang preparing rice for cooking

Ban Yang is bordered by six villages of different ethnic groups, including: Ban Noong Bua Kham and Khokmanh (Khmu and Lao Loum ethnic groups) in Luang Prabang district in the north; Ban Thapene (Kha Hok, Lao Loum, Hmong and Yao ethnic groups), Luang Prabang district and Ban Noong Khoai (Khmu and Hmong ethnic groups) in Xiang Nguen district to the east; Ban Tu Ho and Ban Huoi Long (Hmong ethnic group) in Mueng Nan district in the south, and Ban Huoi Han, Ban Huoi Chia, Ban Huoi Han which are currently merged into Ban Nong Bua Kham next to the Mekong River in the west.

== Demography ==
In December 2016, Ban Yang has 119 families with 447 ethnic Lao Loum people, including 232 women.

== Culture ==
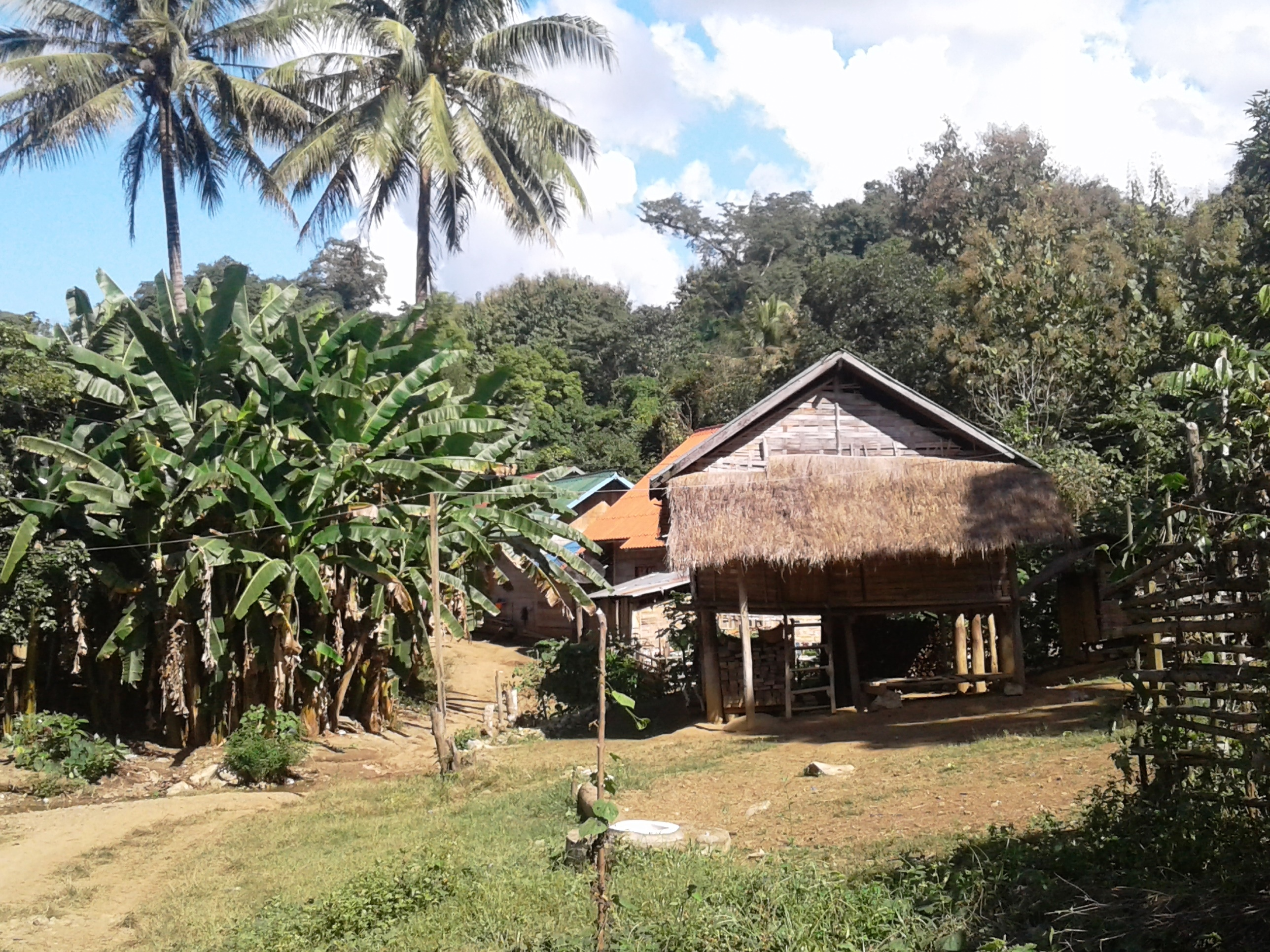
Traditional house style and garden of the Lao Loum in Ban Yang

Ban Yang village is home to the Lao Loum ethnic group. Life, culture and prosperity of the people in Ban Yang is tied to nature. So they have established the sacred forests as Pa Xim for worshiping both Buddha and Nature's Spirit, Pa Lieng Phi Ho for worshiping the Spirit of the Village, also known as the Pa-Ho; Pa Leng Nam for respecting the Spirit of the Water Dragon; Pa Khouang for praying to the Spirit of the Forest, and Pa Xa, the Cemetery Forest. Yearly, the entire villagers together give offerings to these Nature's Spirits through traditional festivals. To preserve the traditional religious beliefs, since the establishment, Ban Yang has formed and maintained the unwritten rules to regulate people's behavior to the spirit forests of the community.

== Economy ==
Economy of the village is mainly subsistent, which heavily depends on traditional slash-burn agriculture, growing sorghum, Luang Prabang upland rice, sesame and maize, raising cows and buffalos, and collecting forest products.

== Agriculture ==
Like many other residents in northern Laos, Lao Loum families in Ban Yang still practice the traditional rotational shifting cultivation. This method is translated into practice as 'xong pi ham, xam pi khop', meaning that, production in one specific plot of land for one year is equivalent to two years of the fallow for recovering soil fertility and vegetation. Depending on the need for foods, availability of labor forces and natural resources capital, that each family would decide whether more or fewer pieces of land be included this method of traditional agriculture.

Slash-and-burn and poking holes for planting seeds are the main technics of the traditional rotational shifting cultivation. On a piece of sloping agricultural land villagers often practice intercropping between different local varieties such as Khao Hay (local upland rice), Mac Duoi (sorghum), Mac Nga (sesame) and Xa Ly (corn). Presently, villagers in Ban Yang also grow Mac Thua Dao (Plukenetia volubilis) as a new crop introduced from outside. These crops are rotationally planted and mixed. A specific crop variety is often never fixed in a plot of farmland but is rotated through a shifting cultivation cycle of 3–4 years or longer.
