= Discoglypremna =

Scientific classification
- Kingdom: Plantae
- Clade: Tracheophytes
- Clade: Angiosperms
- Clade: Eudicots
- Clade: Rosids
- Order: Malpighiales
- Family: Euphorbiaceae
- Subfamily: Acalyphoideae
- Tribe: Caryodendreae
- Genus: Discoglypremna; Prain
- Species: D. caloneura

Binomial name
- Discoglypremna caloneura (Pax) Prain

Synonyms
- Alchornea caloneura Pax

Genus of flowering plants

Discoglypremna is a plant genus of the family Euphorbiaceae first described as a genus in 1911. It contains only one known species, Discoglypremna caloneura, native to tropical Africa (Benin, Ghana, Guinea, Liberia, Ivory Coast, Nigeria, Sierra Leone, Togo, Cabinda, São Tomé & Principé, Central African Republic, Equatorial Guinea, Congo, Zaire, Uganda).
