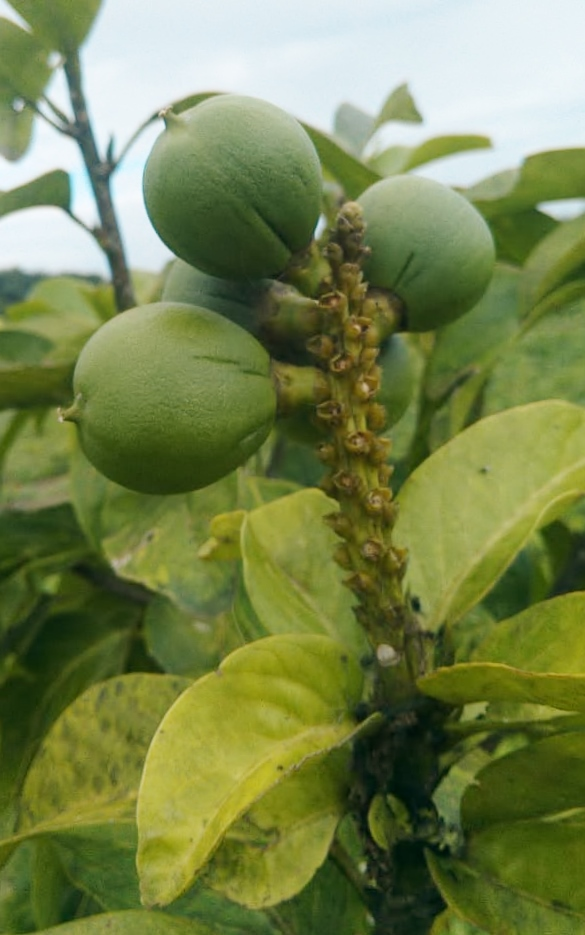
- Caryodendron orinocense

Scientific classification
- Kingdom: Plantae
- Clade: Tracheophytes
- Clade: Angiosperms
- Clade: Eudicots
- Clade: Rosids
- Order: Malpighiales
- Family: Euphorbiaceae
- Subfamily: Acalyphoideae
- Tribe: Caryodendreae

Genera
- Alchorneopsis; Caryodendron; Discoglypremna

= Caryodendreae =

Tribe of flowering plants

Caryodendreae is a tribe of plant of the family Euphorbiaceae. It contains 3 genera.

== See also ==
- Taxonomy of the Euphorbiaceae
