= Caryodendron angustifolium =

Conservation status
- Data Deficient (IUCN 2.3)

Scientific classification
- Kingdom: Plantae
- Clade: Tracheophytes
- Clade: Angiosperms
- Clade: Eudicots
- Clade: Rosids
- Order: Malpighiales
- Family: Euphorbiaceae
- Genus: Caryodendron
- Species: C. angustifolium

Binomial name
- Caryodendron angustifolium Standl.

Species of flowering plant

Caryodendron angustifolium is a species of flowering plant in the family Euphorbiaceae. It is a tree native to Costa Rica, Panama, and Colombia. It grows in lowland rain forest up to 650 metres elevation, where it can grow up to 8 metres tall.
