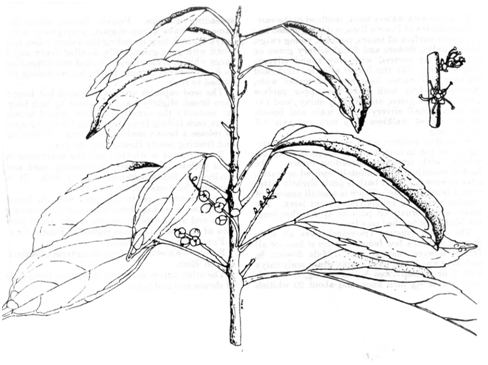
- Alchorneopsis portoricensis

Scientific classification
- Kingdom: Plantae
- Clade: Tracheophytes
- Clade: Angiosperms
- Clade: Eudicots
- Clade: Rosids
- Order: Malpighiales
- Family: Euphorbiaceae
- Subfamily: Acalyphoideae
- Tribe: Caryodendreae
- Genus: Alchorneopsis; Müll.Arg.

Type species
- Alchorneopsis floribunda (Benth.) Müll.Arg.

= Alchorneopsis =

Genus of flowering plants

Alchorneopsis is a genus of flowering plants in the family Euphorbiaceae first described as a genus in 1865. It is native to Central America, the Greater Antilles, and northern South America.

Species

1. Alchorneopsis floribunda (Benth.) Müll.Arg. - Costa Rica, Honduras, Panama, Puerto Rico, Dominican Republic, 3 Guianas, Colombia, Venezuela, Ecuador, Peru, NW Brazil
2. Alchorneopsis portoricensis Urb. - Puerto Rico (considered by some authors to be a synonym for A. floribunda)
