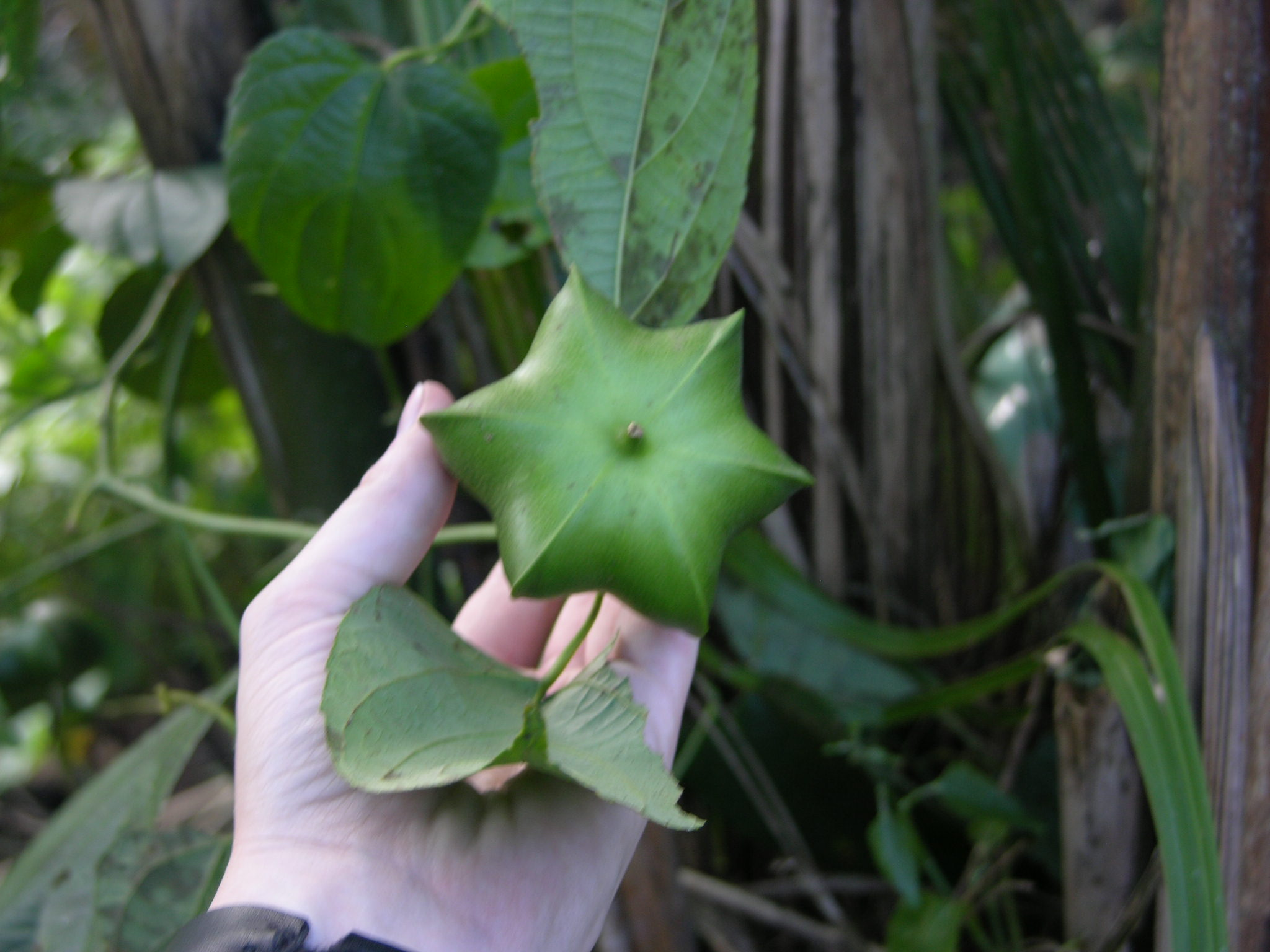
- Fruit of Plukenetia volubilis, Ecuador

Scientific classification
- Kingdom: Plantae
- Clade: Tracheophytes
- Clade: Angiosperms
- Clade: Eudicots
- Clade: Rosids
- Order: Malpighiales
- Family: Euphorbiaceae
- Genus: Plukenetia
- Species: P. volubilis

Binomial name
- Plukenetia volubilis L.

Synonyms
- Fragariopsis paxii Pittier; Plukenetia macrostyla Ule; Plukenetia peruviana Müll.Arg.; Sajorium volubile (L.) Baill.

= Plukenetia volubilis =

Species of flowering plant

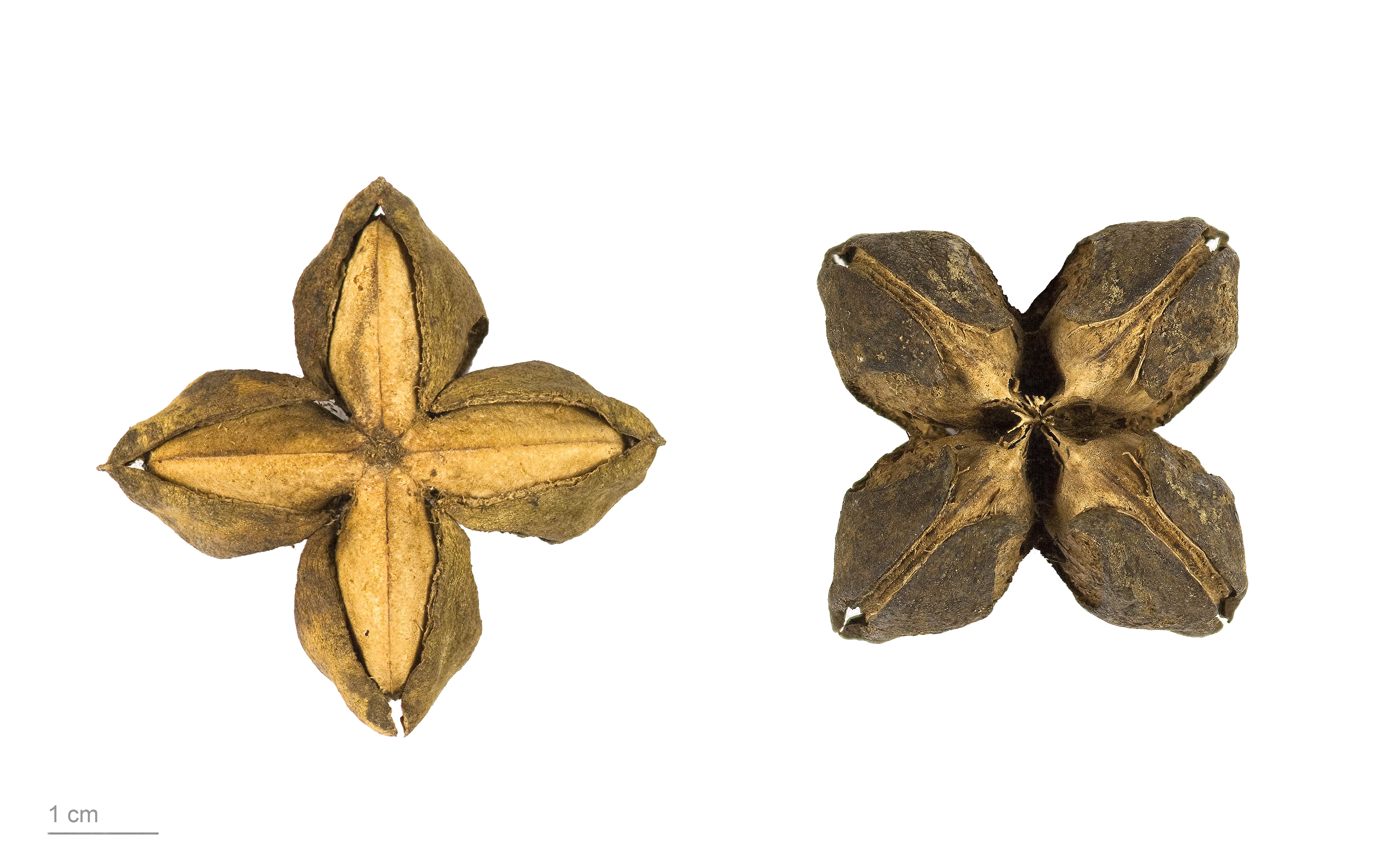
Plukenetia volubilis – MHNT

Plukenetia volubilis, commonly known as sacha inchi, sacha peanut, mountain peanut, Inca nut or Inca-peanut, is a perennial plant in the family Euphorbiaceae, having small trichomes on its leaves.

It is native to tropical South America and the Caribbean. Although its raw seeds and leaves contain toxins, these components are safe for consumption after roasting.

Plukenetia volubilis should not be confused with Caryodendron orinocense, which is commonly known as inchi, cacay, or orinoconut.

== Description ==
The plant reaches a height of 2 metres (6 1/2 ft), with alternate, heart shaped, serrated leaves, 10 to 12 centimetres (4 to 4 3/4 in) long and 8 to 10 cm (3 1/4 to 4 in) wide, that have petioles 2–6 cm (3/4–2 1/4 in) long. It flowers five months after being planted, and bears seeds around the eighth month. The male flowers are small, white, and arranged in clusters. Two female flowers are located at the base of the inflorescence. In tropical locations it is often a vine requiring support and producing seeds nearly year-round.

The fruits are capsules of 3 to 5 cm in diameter with 4 to 7 points, are green and ripen blackish brown. On ripening, the fruits contain a soft black wet pulp that is messy and inedible, so are normally left to dry on the plant before harvest. By two years of age, often up to a hundred dried fruits can be harvested at a time, giving 400 to 500 seeds a few times a year. Fruit capsules usually consist of four to five lobes, but some may have up to seven. Inside are the seeds, oval, dark-brown, 1.5 to 2 cm in diameter with a mass of 0.45 to 1.00 grams. The cotyledons are open, similar to those of almonds, and covered with a whitish film.

== Distribution and habitat ==
It is native to much of tropical South America (Suriname, Venezuela, Bolivia, Colombia, Ecuador, Peru, and northwestern Brazil), as well as some of the Windward Islands in the Caribbean.

In the Amazon rainforest in Peru, it has been cultivated by indigenous people for centuries, and will grow in warm climates up to altitudes of 1,700 m (5,500 ft) as long as there is continued availability of water and good drainage. It grows better in acidic soils and alluvial flats near rivers.

It is cultivated commercially in Southeast Asia, most notably in Thailand.

== Toxicity ==
When raw, P. volubilis seeds and leaves contain appreciable amounts of alkaloids, saponins, and lectins which may be toxic if consumed before cooking, but are degraded by roasting.

== Uses ==
=== Nutrition ===
The seeds have high protein (27%) and oil (35–60%) content, and the oil is rich in the essential fatty acids omega-3 linolenic acid (≈45–53% of total fat content) and omega-6 linoleic acid (≈34–39% of fat content), as well as non-essential omega-9 (≈6–10% of fat content).

The edible seed oil is a source of polyunsaturated fatty acids.

=== Culinary ===
The roasted seeds can be consumed as nuts, and roasted leaves chewed or made into a tea.

Sacha inchi oil has a mild flavor with a nutty finish and may be appropriate for a variety of cuisines, although when consumed daily after one week, some subjects indicated low acceptance for the oil. Rich in alpha-linolenic acid, the oil was evaluated in a 4-month ingestion study (10–15 millilitres per day) by adults, showing it was safe and tended to increase blood levels of HDL cholesterol.

In Peru during 2009, the humanitarian group Oxfam supported techniques for growing sacha inchi as a cash crop by indigenous groups like the Ashaninka.

== Gallery ==
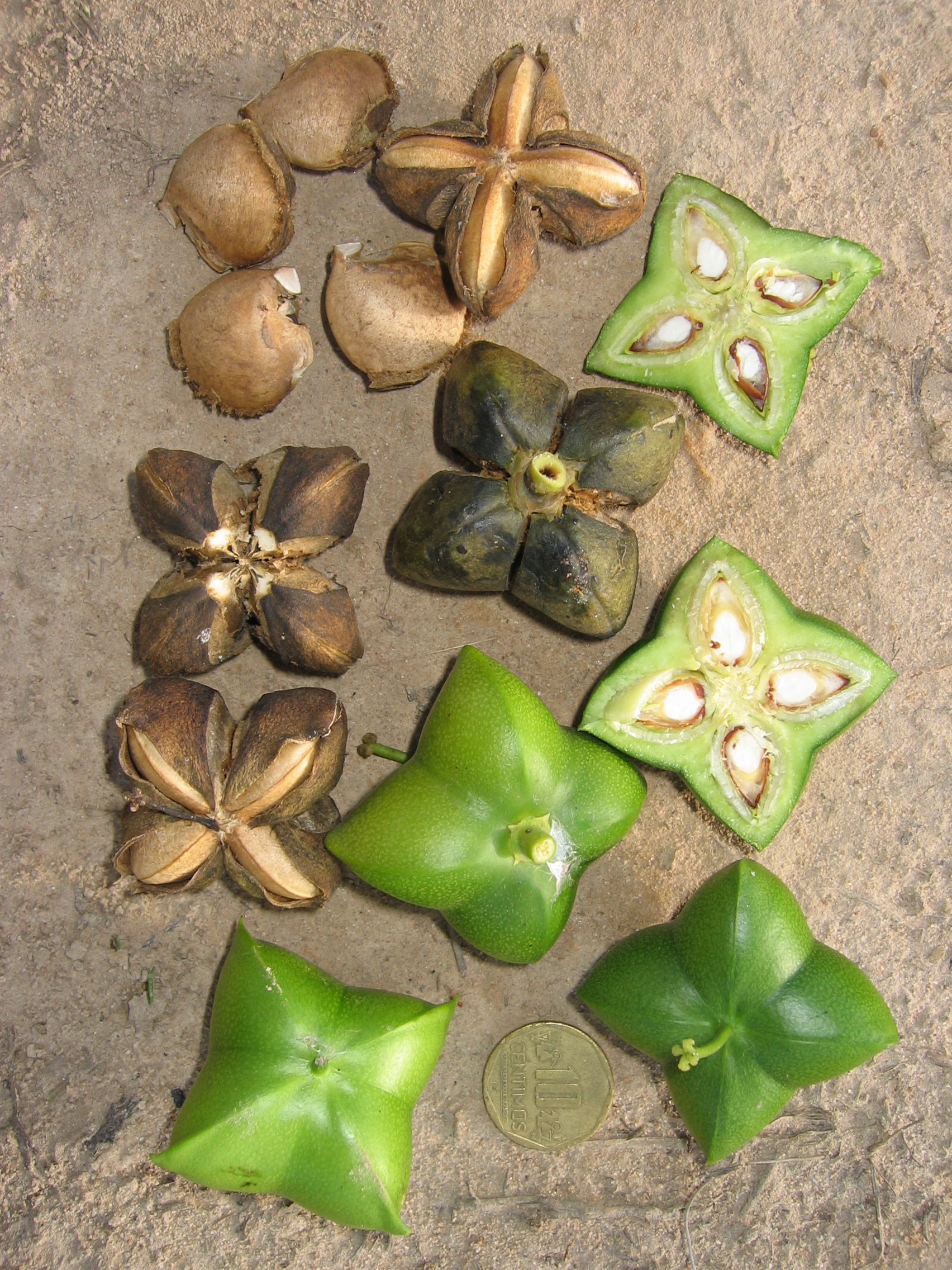
Plukenetia volubilis (Sacha Inchi), Peru
