= Cultural identity theory =

Theory of identity

Cultural identity theory views cultural identity as dynamic and continuously shaped through different types of communication. The theory describes cultural identity as adaptable and influenced through many interactions, contexts, and relationships. Collier and Thomas theorize that cultural identity is expressed in many ways, such as symbols, norms, and meanings that individuals constantly navigate during their exchanges. Cultural identity theory aids in understanding how an individual's cultural identity is communicative and helps some manage cultural differences.

== History ==
Cultural Identity Theory was first developed in the 1980s by communication scholars Mary Jane Collier and Milt Thomas. They combined ethnographic and social constructionist theory to understand how individuals express their cultural identities through regular social interactions. Through daily communication, individuals strengthen their sense of self by reflecting and adjusting themselves based on feedback from others. Later, communication scholar Stella Ting-Toomey developed a related theory called Identity Negotiation Theory, which explores how individual people manage different aspects of their identity, such as cultural or social backgrounds, during communication with people from different backgrounds. Identity Negotiation Theory expands and evolves our understanding of Cultural Identity theory by showing it as a fluid concept and not a fixed one.

== Key concepts ==
Cultural Identity Theory focuses on how people understand, express, and navigate their identities based on cultural group membership. Cultural Identity theory sees identity as something fluid, shaped through communication and interaction rather than fixed traits. People create meaning about who they are based on how they interact with others, especially across cultural lines. This includes concepts like in-groups and out-groups, which influence how people see themselves and others in social situations. Cultural identity constantly shifts depending on where people are physically and mentally, as well as the relationships they have. Psychological factors also play a role, such as the need to belong, feel valued, and maintain consistency with how people see themselves and how others perceive them. Overall, the theory suggests that cultural identity is actively managed through communication as individuals move through different environments and relationships.

== Challenges and criticisms ==
Criticisms have been brought up because cultural identity theory may rely too much on broad cultural categories, which can oversimplify how people actually experience cultural identity across many factors such as race, gender, and class. Some scholars point out that cultural identity theory has a difficult time explaining how identity works online, where people change how they present themselves depending on what is happening. Research on immigrant youth also suggests that cultural identity is shaped by unique challenges that are not fully addressed by the theory, such as integration pressure and cross-cultural expectations.
