= Piedemonte llanero =

Llanero foothills Piedemonte llanero
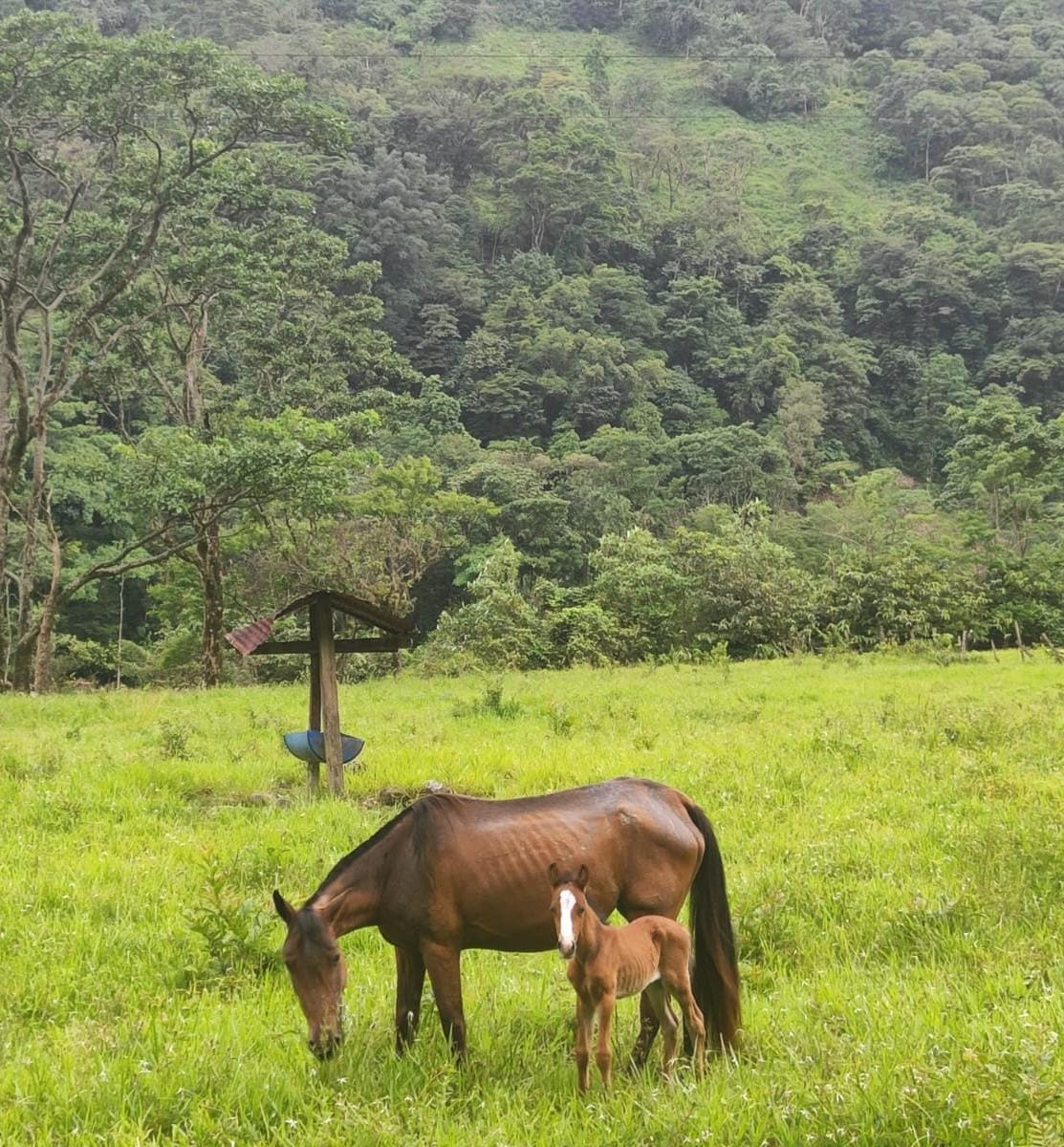
- Mare with her foal in the Llanero Foothills
- Country: Colombia
- Department: Arauca, Boyacá, Casanare, Cundinamarca, Meta and Norte de Santander

The Piedemonte llanero (English: Llanero foothills) is a region of Colombia. It is characterized by being the limit between the mountain ranges of the Andes and the Llanos Orientales. It is located in the foothills of the Cordillera Oriental and includes part of the departments of Arauca, Boyacá, Casanare, Cundinamarca, Meta and Norte de Santander.

This subregion is located between 700 and 300 m above sea level, with average temperatures of 23 to 30 °C and a biseasonal rainfall regime with 3,000 to 4,000 mm of annual precipitation. It is covered in a large area by a dense tropical forest rich in flora and fauna, being considered biogeographically as an extension of the Orinoco jungle and at the same time an extension of the Amazon rainforest.

Agriculturally, the most extensive product is the banana, although many more are grown, such as citrus fruits (Tahiti lime, mandarin and orange), papaya and watermelon. For communication with other regions of the country, the area only has two roads: the Villavicencio-Bogotá road and the Villavicencio-Barranca de Upía -Yopal-Sogamoso road.
