= Muang Ngoi Neua =

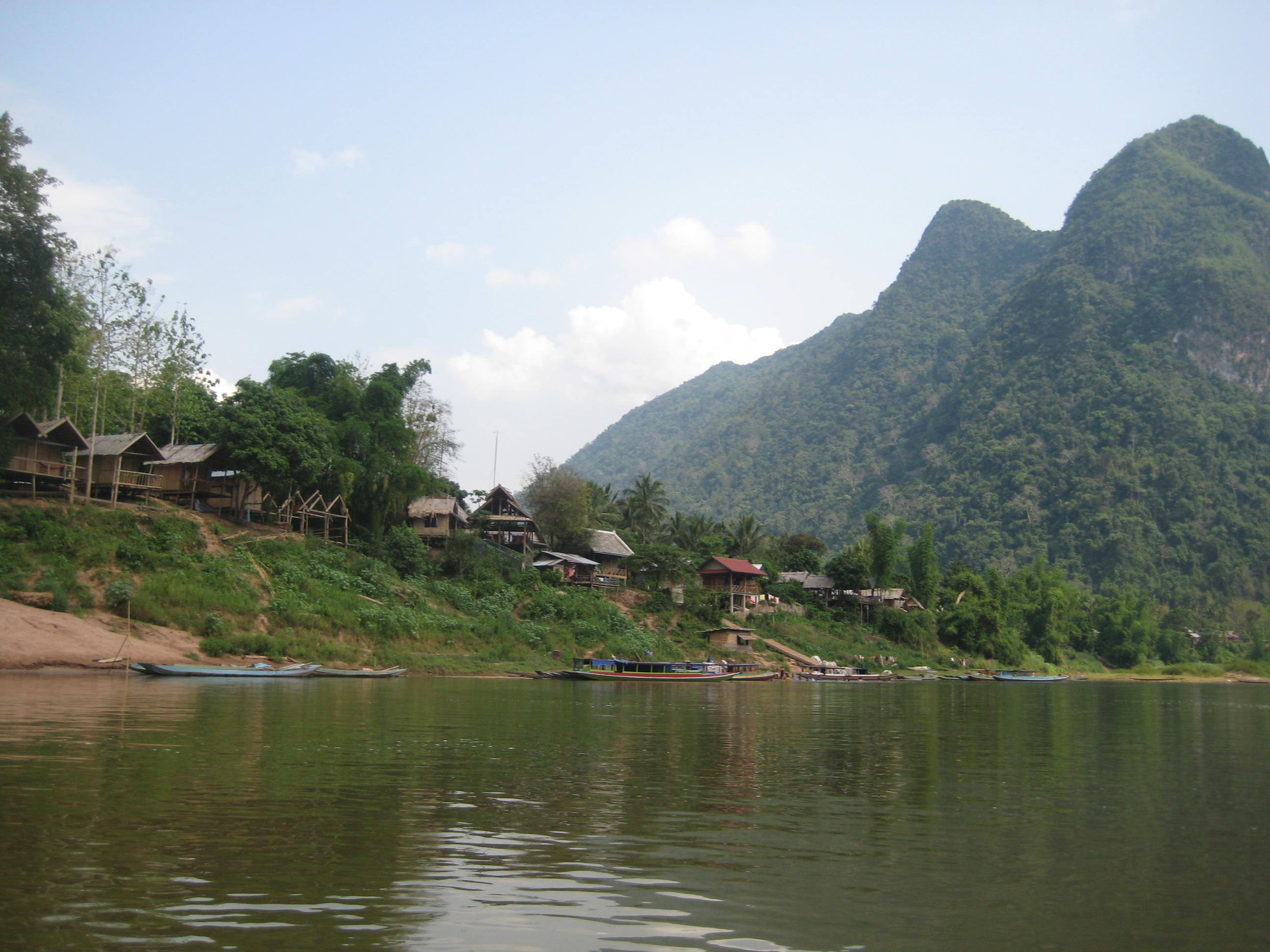
View of Muang Ngoi Neua from the Nam Ou River

Muang Ngoi Neua is a Lao town along the Nam Ou in Louangphrabang Province. It is part of Ngoi district 170 kilometres North-East of Luang Prabang.

The current population is about 700, and of Lao Loum ethnicity.

The town is an old Tai Mueang and was heavily bombed during the Laotian Civil War.

== Name ==
Historically the town is known as Muang Ngoi, Mueang for main centre and Ngoi for the Nam Ngoi river, that flows into the Nam Ou at the town. The name was changed to Muang Ngoi Neua (Muang Ngoi North) to reflect population shifts that occurred in Ngoi district during and after the civil war. Muang Ngoi now covers the joined towns of Nong Kiau and Ban Saphoun, 40 kilometres to the south. The town is also referred to as Muang Ngoi Gao (Old Muang Ngoi).

== History ==
One of the earliest Tai principalities in Laos was centered at Muang Ngoi. By the 12th century AD there were settlements in the area that were part of a chain of Tai Mueangs along the Nam Ou River. The current town dates from the 15th century and is the old district capital.

In 1713, Chao Intasom, son of the first king of Luang Prabang, halted his army in Muang Ngoi to prepare for an attack on his nephew Chao Ong Kham, who succeeded the king. It was here that the two nephews came to an agreement and decided to share the throne together.

In 1892, shortly before the incorporation of Laos into French Indochina, there was a military station with 25 soldiers which served as a frontier post of Siam.

During the Laotian Civil War, Pathet Lao forces were stationed in a cave near Muang Ngoi. The town was uninhabitable for over 2 years due to the threat of bombing raids by the Royal Laotian Air Force, forcing hundreds of villagers to relocate to a nearby cave.

== Temples ==
All three Buddhist temples, with the oldest dating back to the 16th century, were destroyed during the Vietnam War by American-supplied and Thai-piloted bombers. On the site of one of the destroyed temples the current Wat Okad temple was rebuilt in the late 1970s.

== Tourism ==
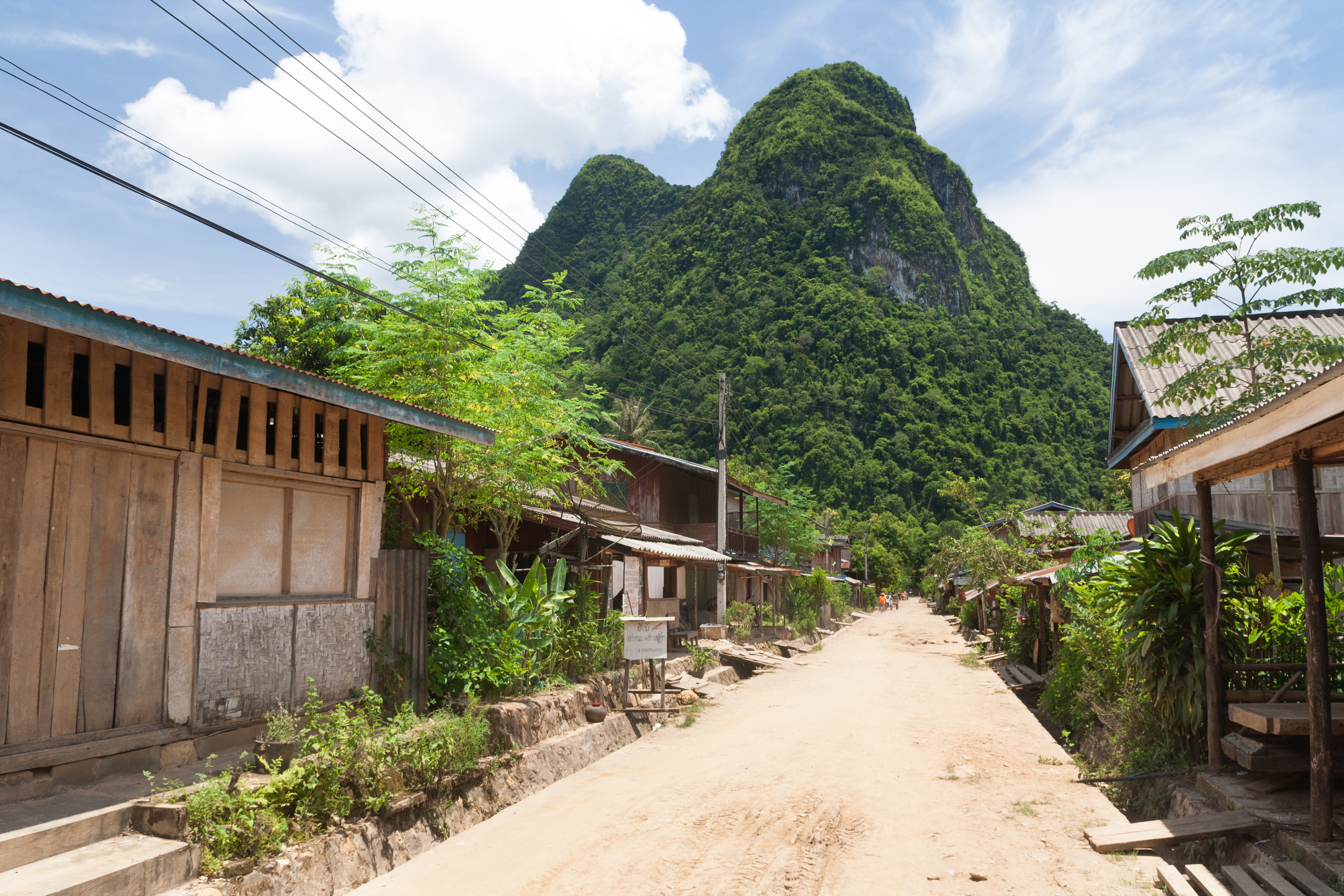
Muang Ngoi Neua main road

The town is a popular tourist destination because of its surrounding karst limestone mountains and is the starting point of Eco-tourism treks. Notable sights include the Tham Kang cave and Tham Pha Kaew cave north of town which were used as bombshelters during the Vietnam-war era. Every ten days there is a regional market where tribal villagers come to trade.

It is also possible to walk to little-visited surrounding villages for lunch - the nearest is Ban Na about an hour away beyond the caves. There are two other villages further afield on the same route.

It is also possible to take boat trips further up the Nam Ou River.
