= Nong Khiaw =

Nong Khiaw ຫນອງຂຽວ Nong Kiau
- Village
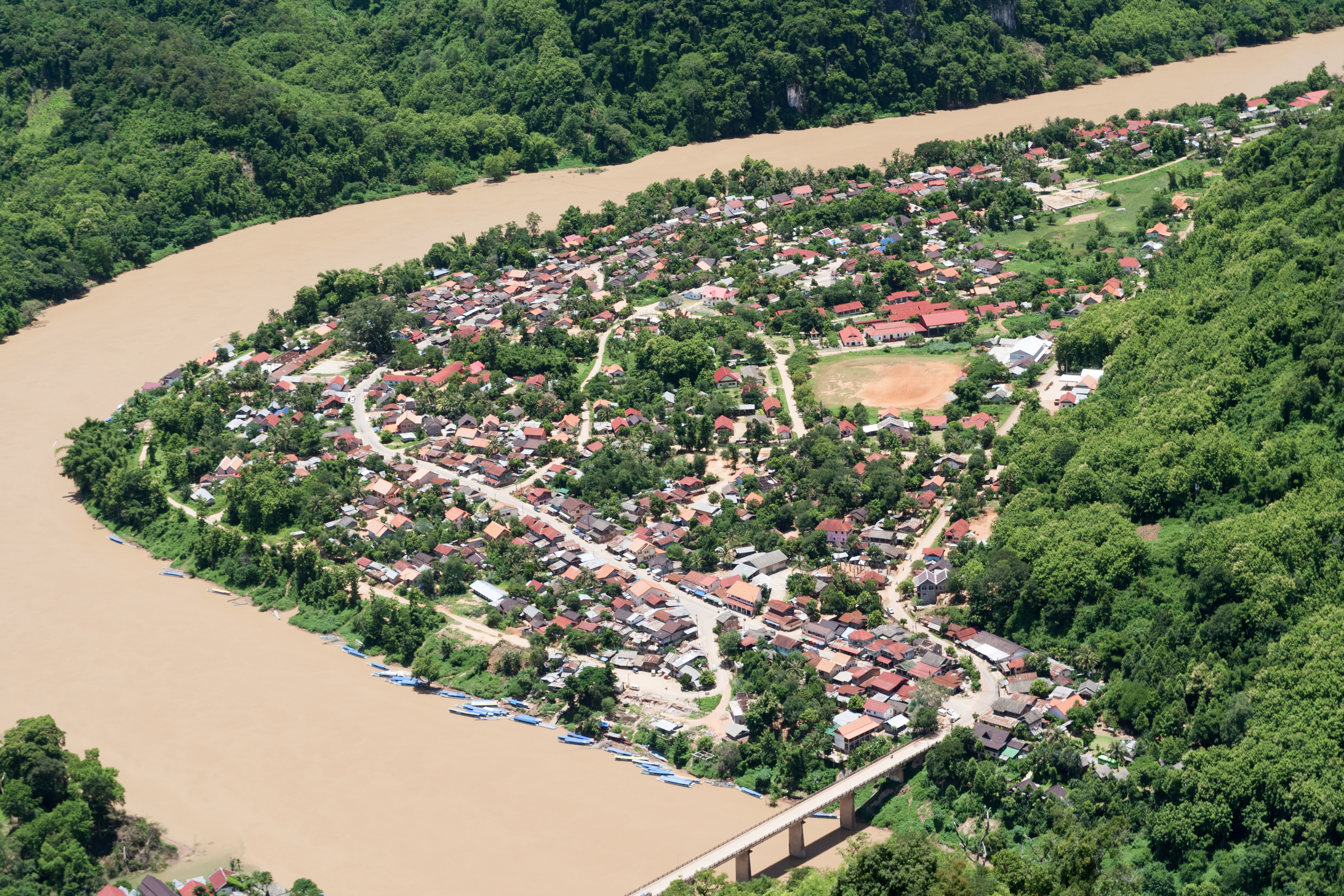

- Location within Laos
- Coordinates: 20°34′16.63″N 102°36′41.24″E
- Country: Laos
- Province: Luang Prabang
- Time zone: UTC+7 (Laos Standard Time)

Nong Khiaw (Lao: ຫນອງຂຽວ, pronounced [nɔ̌ːŋ kʰǐa̯w]; also Nong Kiau), is a village in the Laotian province of Luang Prabang. It is located on the Nam Ou river in Ngoy district.

== Overview ==
Nong Khiaw is a popular tourist destination because of the walking and cycling routes near the village and the mountain-climbing opportunities. The only good way to get there used to be by boat from Luang Prabang or Muang Khua, near the Vietnamese border. This is not the case anymore due to the construction of dams on the Nam Ou river since 2017. There is also a road from Pak Mong to Hat Sao. The village is well known in Laos because of the bridge, which was given by China, that connects the two parts of the town. The bridge gives you a great view of the Nam Ou river, and the breathtaking rocks, mountains, and hills around it.

On April 21, 2021, Nong Khiaw appeared in an episode of Race to the Center of the Earth on National Geographic, where three teachers from Seattle had to take a nauseating ride in a minibus along winding roads to the final waypoint in the village. They finished ahead of the pace time.
