= Cyrtodactylus vilaphongi =

Conservation status
- Data Deficient (IUCN 3.1)

Scientific classification
- Kingdom: Animalia
- Phylum: Chordata
- Class: Reptilia
- Order: Squamata
- Suborder: Gekkota
- Family: Gekkonidae
- Genus: Cyrtodactylus
- Species: C. vilaphongi

Binomial name
- Cyrtodactylus vilaphongi Schneider, T.Q. Nguyen, M.D. Le, Nophaseud, Bonkowski & Ziegler, 2014

Species of lizard

Cyrtodactylus vilaphongi is a species of gecko, a lizard in the family Gekkonidae. It is endemic to Laos.

== Etymology ==
The specific name, vilaphongi, is in honor of Laotian conservationist Vilaphong Kanyasone, who was one of the collectors of the holotype.

== Geographic range ==
C. vilaphongi is found in northern Laos, in Luang Prabang Province.

== Habitat ==
The preferred natural habitats of C. vilaphongi are forest and rocky areas, at altitudes of 577–597 m (1,893–1,959 ft).

== Description ==
C. vilaphongi may attain a snout-to-vent length (SVL) of 8.5 cm (3.3 in).

== Reproduction ==
The mode of reproduction of C. vilaphongi is unknown.
