= Schistura aramis =

Conservation status
- Data Deficient (IUCN 3.1)

Scientific classification
- Kingdom: Animalia
- Phylum: Chordata
- Class: Actinopterygii
- Order: Cypriniformes
- Family: Nemacheilidae
- Genus: Schistura
- Species: S. aramis

Binomial name
- Schistura aramis Kottelat, 2000

Species of fish

Schistura aramis is a species of ray-finned fish in the stone loach genus Schistura from the Nam Nua catchment, a tributary of the Nam Ou in Laos, it may also possibly occur in Vietnam. The specific name comes from one of Alexandre Dumas' The Three Musketeers, Aramis as do that of two other Schistura species endemic to the Nam Ou basin, S. athos and S.porthos.
