= Ngoy district =

Coordinates: 20.5803°N 102.5997°E

Ngoy district ເມືອງງອຍ
- District
- Interactive map of Ngoy district
- Country: Laos
- Province: Luang Prabang
- Time zone: UTC+7 (ICT)

Ngoy is a district (muang) of Luang Prabang province in northern Laos.

== Gallery ==
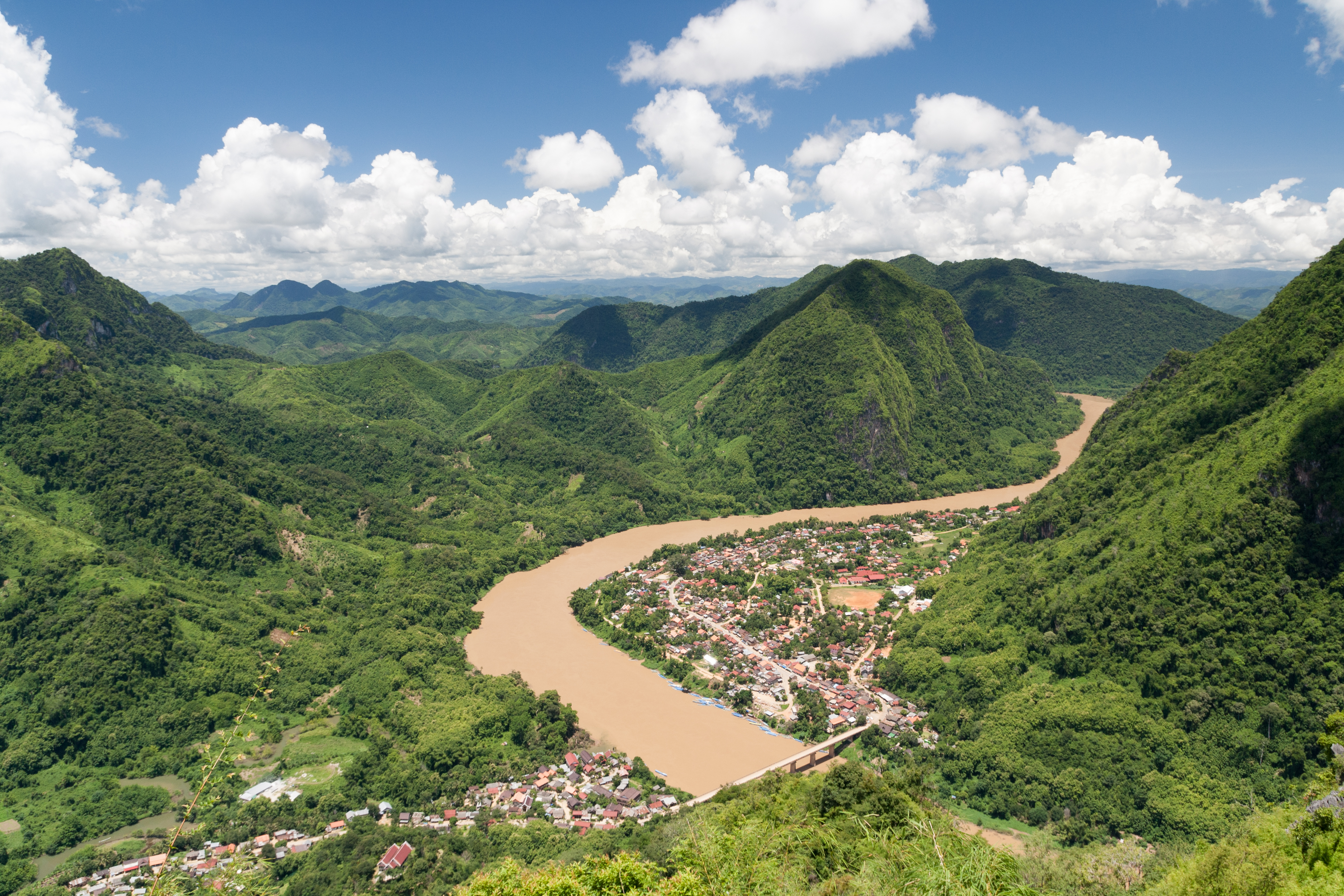
Nong Khiaw

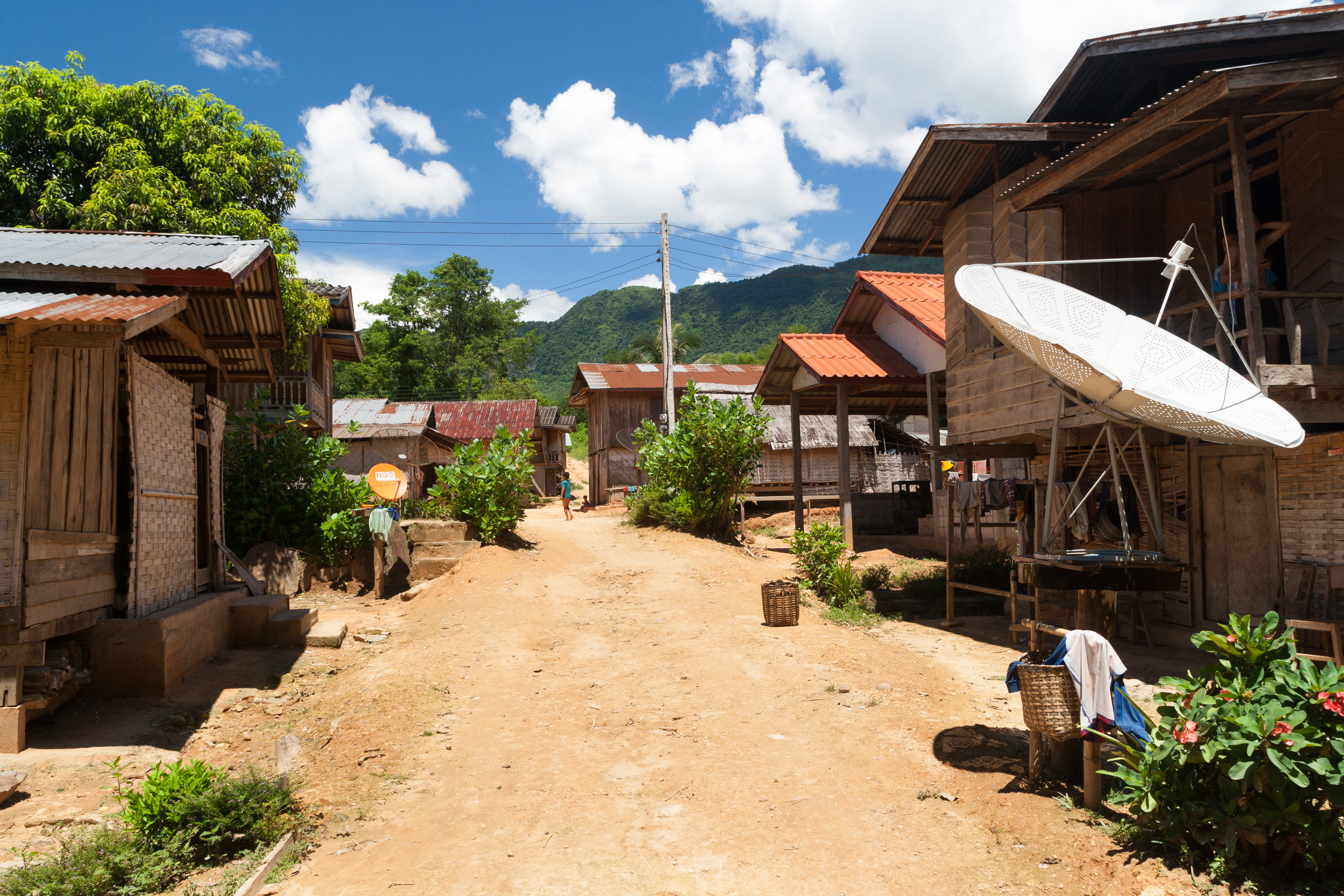
Sop Keng

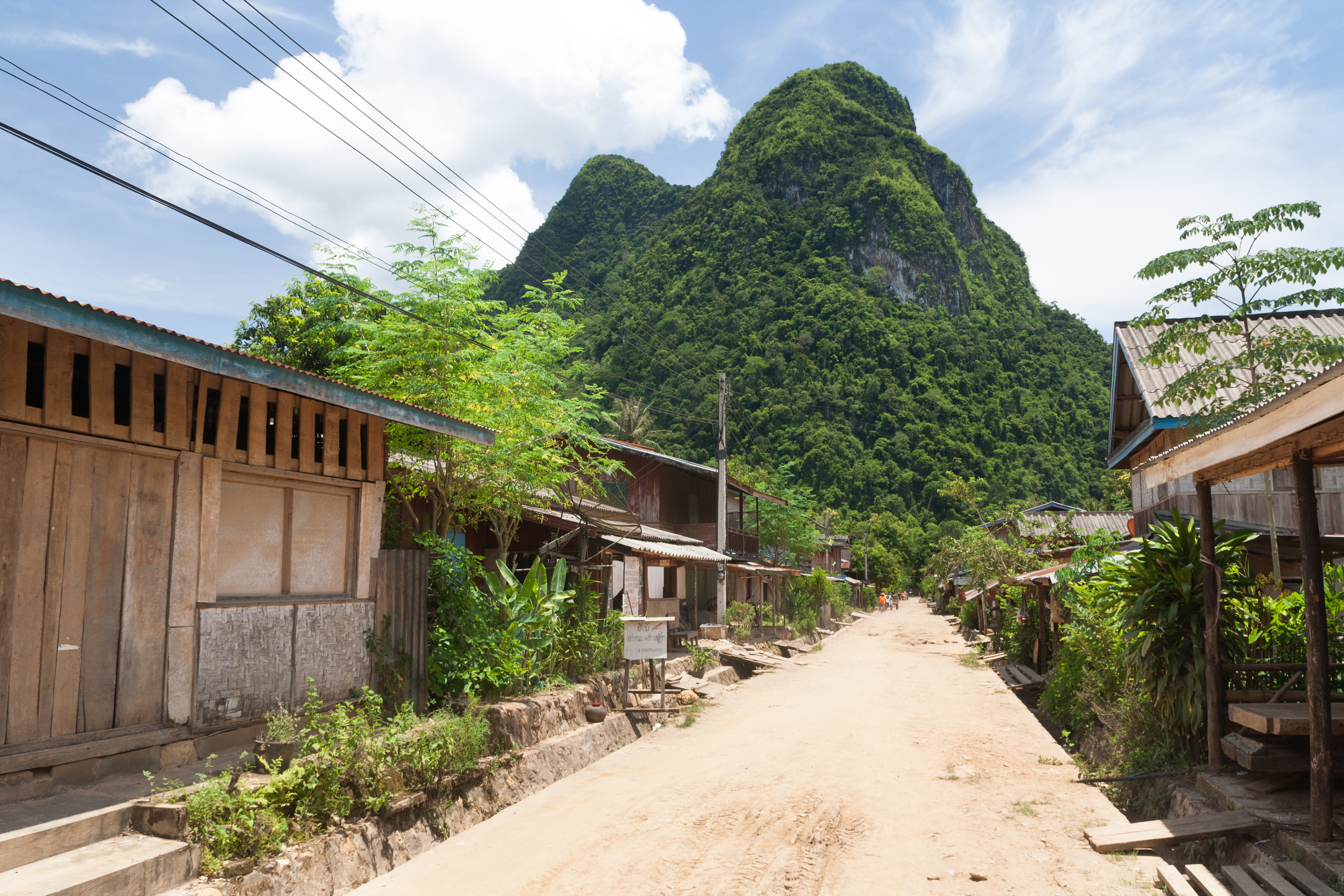
Muang Ngoi Neua
