= Schistura athos =

Conservation status
- Least Concern (IUCN 3.1)

Scientific classification
- Kingdom: Animalia
- Phylum: Chordata
- Class: Actinopterygii
- Order: Cypriniformes
- Family: Nemacheilidae
- Genus: Schistura
- Species: S. athos

Binomial name
- Schistura athos Kottelat, 2000

Species of fish

Schistura athos is a species of ray-finned fish in the stone loach genus Schistura, its specific name athos is from, Athos, one of the Three Musketeers by Alexandre Dumas, as do that of two other Schistura species endemic to the Nam Ou basin, S. aramis and S.porthos. It has only been recorded from the Nam Ou basin in Laos, as well as from a stretch of the Nam Noua, a tributary of the Nam Ou, in Vietnam. S. athos has been collected from rapids and stretches of the main river with stone substrates.
