= Schistura porthos =

Conservation status
- Least Concern (IUCN 3.1)

Scientific classification
- Kingdom: Animalia
- Phylum: Chordata
- Class: Actinopterygii
- Order: Cypriniformes
- Family: Nemacheilidae
- Genus: Schistura
- Species: S. porthos

Binomial name
- Schistura porthos Kottelat, 2000

Species of fish

Schistura porthos is a species of ray-finned fish in the stone loach genus Schistura from the Mekong basin; the Nam Ngiap, Nam Khan, Nam Xuang, Nam Ou and Nam Tha drainages in northern Laos and the Luosuojiang drainage in Xishuangbanna, Yunnan. The specific name comes from one of Alexandre Dumas' The Three Musketeers, Aramis as do that of two other Schistura species endemic to the Nam Ou basin, S. athos and S.aramis.
