= Race to the Center of the Earth =

American reality television show

- Genre: Reality competition
- Created by: Elise Doganieri; Bertram van Munster
- Narrated by: Chris Payne Gilbert
- Composers: Jeff Lippencott; Mark T. Williams
- Country of origin: United States
- Original language: English
- No. of seasons: 1
- No. of episodes: 7

Production
- Executive producers: Elise Doganieri; Bertram van Munster; Matt Renner; Kirk Durham; Darren Bunkley
- Producers: Chris Decima; Ashley Ryf-Pallister; Taylor Van Byssum
- Production locations: South America; North America; Russia; Southeast Asia
- Cinematography: Josh Gitersonke
- Editor: Josh Earl
- Camera setup: Multi-camera
- Running time: 60-105 minutes
- Production company: New Media Collective

Original release
- Network: National Geographic
- Release: March 29 – May 10, 2021

Race to the Center of the Earth is an American reality television show that premiered on March 29, 2021. The show was created by Elise Doganieri and Bertram van Munster, who previously had created The Amazing Race, of which Race to the Center of the Earth is fashioned after.

The show consists of four teams of three adventurers racing to "the center of the Earth." The four teams start in different corners of the Earth and all race along designated routes to a buoy in the middle of the ocean, designating the center of the Earth. There are no eliminations, but the first team to reach the buoy wins and gets to split the million-dollar prize that goes along with it.

== Contestants ==
Individual names	Team name	Relationship	City of origin	Starting place	Ending place	Ref.
Dave Bacon	Team North America	Work Colleagues	Denver, Colorado	Tadoussac, Canada	Vancouver, Canada	
Paul Montague Jr.	Team North America	Work Colleagues	Denver, Colorado	Tadoussac, Canada	Vancouver, Canada	
Mindy Murphy	Team North America	Work Colleagues	Denver, Colorado	Tadoussac, Canada	Vancouver, Canada	
Jeremy Conkling	Team Russia	Police Officers	Anchorage, Alaska	Irkutsk, Russia	Vladivostok, Russia	
Angelina Fraize	Team Russia	Police Officers	Anchorage, Alaska	Irkutsk, Russia	Vladivostok, Russia	
Christopher Nelson	Team Russia	Police Officers	Anchorage, Alaska	Irkutsk, Russia	Vladivostok, Russia	
Autumn Fryer	Team South America	Rock Climbing Friends	San Diego, California	Ushuaia, Argentina	Antofagasta, Chile (Note: Due to civil unrest in the country, Team South America was unable to race for two days and was evacuated from Chile before reaching Antofagasta. As compensation, the team's average score from the eleven days they raced was added to each of the days they could not race.)	
Jon Irwin	Team South America	Rock Climbing Friends	San Diego, California	Ushuaia, Argentina	Antofagasta, Chile	
Sierra Knott	Team South America	Rock Climbing Friends	San Diego, California	Ushuaia, Argentina	Antofagasta, Chile	
James Batey	Team Southeast Asia	Teachers	Seattle, Washington	Mã Pí Lèng Pass, Vietnam	Singapore	
Marilina Kim	Team Southeast Asia	Teachers	Seattle, Washington	Mã Pí Lèng Pass, Vietnam	Singapore	
Jay Wyatt	Team Southeast Asia	Teachers	Seattle, Washington	Mã Pí Lèng Pass, Vietnam	Singapore	

== Results ==
Each day, teams received a pre-determined pace time to pass through a series of waypoints until they reach the final waypoint. If they finished at least 30 minutes ahead of the pace time, they would receive 2 points. If they arrived within 30 minutes of the pace time, they would receive 1 point. If they finished behind the pace time, they would receive 0 points. If they fell so far behind that they were swept off the course for safety reasons, they would lose a point. The scores would determine the starting placement of teams in the final stage with the highest scoring team in pole position.

Team	Stage One														Stage Two		
Team	1	2	3	4	5	6	7	8	9	10	11	12	13	Net Score	Starting Placement	Midstage Placement	Final Placement
Team Southeast Asia	1	2	0	2	2	1	2	2	1	0	1	2	2	18	2nd	1st	1st
Team North America	2	2	0	1	1	0	2	1	2	2	2	1	2	18	2nd	2nd	2nd
Team Russia	1	2	1	2	1	2	1	2	1	2	1	1	2	19	1st	3rd	3rd
Team South America	–1	2	0	2	2	0	2	2	1	2	1.27	2	1.27	16.54	3rd	4th	4th

== Production ==
On May 14, 2019, National Geographic Networks ordered the creation of a new show, titled Race to the Center of the Earth, which involved four teams of three competing from different locations in the world and racing to a singular buoy in the mid-Pacific Ocean. Geoff Daniels, executive VP of unscripted entertainment for National Geographic Networks, stated, "Unlike other competition formats, Race to the Center of the Earth will combine the grittiness of a survival show with the cinematic style of a feature film action-thriller dropping viewers into the middle of a heart-pounding journey unlike anything ever made for television." Casting for the series began in June 2019, and filming started and ended in October, taking only two and a half weeks to finish. On January 17, 2020, at the TV Critics Association press tour, it was announced that the four teams would be competing from different corners of the Earth, one starting in Canada, one in South America, one in Southeast Asia, and one in Siberia in eastern Russia. During the interviewing at the press tour, co-creator Elise Doganieri explained that the routes for each team were meticulously planned and tested to be equal and fair. According to Bertram van Munster, the production team tested each route three times to ensure fairness. The first season premiered on March 29, 2021, and the season was released in its entirety on Disney+ on May 14, 2021 during the week of its finale. On January 20, 2022, National Geographic announced that the show would not be renewed for a second season.

== Episodes ==
No. overall	No. in season	Title	Original release date	U.S. viewers (millions)
1	1	"Hit the Ground Running"	March 29, 2021	0.23
Stage One; Day 1: Team North America had to travel by boat up the Saguenay River to Cap Trinité, where they had to complete a three stage climb halfway up the cliff face to the final waypoint on the tree ledge. They finished ahead of the pace time.; Team Russia had to load bikes onto a truck, which would take them into a taiga forest. Then, they had to bike to a UAZ-452 and drive across a river to the final waypoint at a Buryatian yurt on the shores of Lake Baikal. They finished within 30 minutes of the pace time.; Team South America had to hike through blizzard conditions to a pickup truck, drive to Cape San Pablo, cross the Río San Pablo on foot to another vehicle by the Desdemona shipwreck, drive across the Argentina–Chile border, and then take a ferry to the final waypoint at the lighthouse in Punta Delgada, Chile. They fell so far behind that they were swept off the course for safety reasons at the border crossing.; Team Southeast Asia had to navigate the Mã Pí Lèng Pass to a bike trail, bike uphill to the Heaven's Gate bus stop, take a bus with their bikes to Hà Giang, and then bike to the final waypoint at a rice farm on the banks of the Lô River. They finished within 30 minutes of the pace time.; Day 2: Team North America had to continue their climb up Cap Trinité, which included a jump from one rock face to another, to the final waypoint at the treeline. They finished ahead of the pace time.; Team Russia had to continue driving to a ferry that would take them to Olkhon Island, where they had to ride mountain bikes and horses to the final waypoint at a weather station. They finished ahead of the pace time.; Team South America had to drive a pickup truck to Torres del Paine National Park then hike to the final waypoint at an estancia. They finished ahead of the pace time.; Team Southeast Asia had to board a seaplane that would take them to Hạ Long Bay. There, they traveled by motorized boat to a floating village, from which they had to row a sampan to the final waypoint aboard a junk. They finished ahead of the pace time.
2	2	"Back Breaker"	April 5, 2021	0.18
Day 3: Team North America had to board a seaplane in Quebec City that would take them to Kenora and then portage a canoe to the final waypoint at the Wreck Lake campsite. They finished behind the pace time.; Team Russia had to rappel and hike down a cliff to a beach from which they had to kayak to the final waypoint on a transport boat. They finished within 30 minutes of the pace time.; Team South America had to drive to Argentino Lake, kayak past the Perito Moreno Glacier, and travel by bus to the final waypoint. They finished behind the pace time.; Team Southeast Asia had to row a sampan to a beach, swim a fishing boat that would take them to the Cát Bà Island bus stop, board a bus to Ninh Bình, and take a taxi to the final waypoint at a homestead. They finished behind the pace time.; Day 4: Team North America had to continue their portage to the final waypoint at a blue truck atop a cliff, which would take them to Winnipeg. They finished within 30 minutes of the pace time.; Team Russia had to kayak across Lake Baikal and drive a Lada to the final waypoint at a cabin. They finished ahead of the pace time.; Team South America had to hike and traverse a via ferrata up Cagliero Glacier to the final waypoint at a campsite. They finished ahead of the pace time.; Team Southeast Asia had to drive a jeep across Thanh Hóa Province and take a bus across the Laos–Vietnam border to the final waypoint at a guesthouse. They finished ahead of the pace time.
3	3	"The Going Gets Tough"	April 12, 2021	0.22
Day 5: Team North America had to drive from Winnipeg to Dinosaur Provincial Park and hike to the final waypoint at a campsite. They finished within 30 minutes of the pace time.; Team Russia had to drive to the Novy Uoyan train depot and board a train on the Baikal–Amur Mainline to the final waypoint at a homestay in Kuanda. They finished within 30 minutes of the pace time.; Team South America had to drive through the Patagonian Desert to the final waypoint in Las Horquetas. They finished ahead of the pace time.; Team Southeast Asia had to take a nauseating ride in a minibus along winding roads to the final waypoint in Nong Khiaw. They finished ahead of the pace time.; Day 6: Team North America had to cross Red Deer River in inflatable rafts, carry the rafts across a marsh to a 4x4, and then drive to the final waypoint at a campsite in Bragg Creek. They finished behind the pace time.; Team Russia had to drive to an Evenki camp and lead a herd of reindeer to the final waypoint at a teepee in the Chara Sands. They finished ahead of the pace time.; Team South America had to continue their drive through the Patagonian Desert to the final waypoint at a hotel. They finished behind the pace time.; Team Southeast Asia had to row a skiff down the Mekong to the final waypoint at a restaurant in Luang Prabang. They finished within 30 minutes of the pace time.
4	4	"A Marathon of Pain"	April 19, 2021	0.23
Day 7 At the start of the day, teams' GPSes posted the Big Reveal listing the teams, their locations, and their standings.: Team North America had to bike to the Kananaskis River then whitewater raft to the final waypoint at a Nakoda reserve. They finished ahead of the pace time.; Team Russia had to cross the Chara Sands to a GAZ amphibious vehicle that would take them to Chara, where they had to board a bus to the final waypoint at the Novaya Chara train station. They finished within 30 minutes of the pace time.; Team South America had to take a ferry across the Limay River, rappel down a cliff, then hike across Nahuel Huapi National Park to the final waypoint at Lago Frías. They finished ahead of the pace time.; Team Southeast Asia had to travel by riverboat to the final waypoint at the rest area in Pakbeng. They finished ahead of the pace time.; Day 8: Team North America had to traverse a via ferrata to reach the Mt Norquay summit then descend the mountain to reach a transport vehicle that they could drive to their final waypoint at a hostel. They finished within 30 minutes of the pace time.; Team Russia had to travel by train to Tynda then travel by foot to the final waypoint at the town market. They finished ahead of the pace time.; Team South America had to paddle canoes across Lago Frías then bike across the Argentina–Chile border to the final waypoint in Peulla, Chile. They finished ahead of the pace time.; Team Southeast Asia had to travel across the Laos–Thailand border then whitewater raft down the Nam Wa River to the final waypoint at a campsite. They finished ahead of the pace time.
5	5	"Down to the Wire"	April 26, 2021	0.20
Day 9: Team North America had to travel to Mount Athabasca then hike up to the final waypoint at a campsite on the summit. They finished ahead of the pace time.; Team Russia had to travel by train to the final waypoint at the Khabarovsk train station. They finished within 30 minutes of the pace time.; Team South America had to travel by helicopter to the peak of Osorno Volcano, descend to the base, and whitewater raft the Petrohué River to the final waypoint at a river hut. They finished within 30 minutes of the pace time.; Team Southeast Asia had to travel by plane to Bangkok then travel in a tuk-tuk through the city's congested streets to the final waypoint at the Bangkok railway station. They finished within 30 minutes of the pace time.; Day 10: Team North America had to descend down Mount Athabasca to a recreational vehicle that they had to drive to the final waypoint at a caribou lodge in Clinton, British Columbia. They finished ahead of the pace time.; Team Russia had to drive to the Bikin River, travel by boat along the river to a Siberian tiger shrine, then hike through Bikin National Park to the final waypoint at an Udege campsite. They finished ahead of the pace time.; Team South America had to travel by pickup truck and snowmobile to the final waypoint atop Villarrica. They finished ahead of the pace time.; Team Southeast Asia had to travel by train, bus, and long-tail boat to Krabi, climb up Thaiwand Wall, traverse a cave, rappel down, then kayak to the final waypoint at Railay Beach. They finished behind the pace time.; Day 11: Team Russia began the day by paddling a canoe down the Bikin to reach a Mil Mi-8 helicopter that would fly them over the Sikhote-Alin to Mount Lysaya before hiking down to the final waypoint at a campsite.; Team South America had to travel by plane from Santiago to San Pedro de Atacama, but were evacuated from the city due to a national strike caused by the 2019–2021 Chilean protests.
6	6	"The Final Push"	May 3, 2021	0.23
Day 11: Team North America had to ride horses through Edge Hills Provincial Park to the Fraser River before traveling by jet boat to the final waypoint in Lillooet. They finished ahead of the pace time.; Team Russia continued traveling to the final waypoint at a campsite. They finished within 30 minutes of the pace time.; Team South America was driven to a safe point in San Alfonso outside of Santiago due to civil unrest in the city.; Team Southeast Asia was driven to the Malaysia–Thailand border from which they had to drive to the final waypoint at Concubine Lane in Ipoh. They finished within 30 minutes of the pace time.; Day 12: Team North America had to drive ATVs through Squamish, British Columbia then hike to the final waypoint. They finished within 30 minutes of the pace time.; Team Russia had to travel by train to Podstantsia train station in Ekaterinovka, traverse up a via ferrata to the top of a cliff, drive to a waterfront, then paddle a raft to the final waypoint on a ship. They finished within 30 minutes of the pace time.; Team South America had to ride horses to the final waypoint at a campsite in San José de Maipo. They finished ahead of the pace time. The team was then evacuated from Chile for safety reasons ending Stage One early. For each of the two days missed, the team's average score over the eleven days was added to their total score.; Team Southeast Asia had to drive to the Titiwangsa Mountains, hike through a dense rainforest, then drive to the final waypoint at the Oriental Heritage in Kuala Lumpur. They finished ahead of the pace time.; Day 13: Team North America had to rappel down Monmouth Falls then raft down the Squamish River to a rigid inflatable boat that would take them to their final waypoint beneath Burrard Bridge in Vancouver. They finished ahead of the pace time.; Team Russia had to sail to the final waypoint beneath Zolotoy Bridge in Vladivostok. They finished ahead of the pace time.; Team Southeast Asia had to travel by bus to Singapore then bike from Marina Barrage to the final waypoint at Jewel Changi Airport. They finished ahead of the pace time.
7	7	"A Million Bucks or Bust"	May 10, 2021	0.20
Stage Two; Day 1: After arriving in Maui, teams started Stage Two in ten-minute intervals based on their scores from the previous 13 days. Leaving from Maalaea Beach, teams had to paddle outrigger canoes across Māʻalaea Bay to a ranch maze. After biking through the maze on electric bicycles, teams had to load their bikes onto a truck and climb up a knotted rope to the top of a waterfall. Teams would then be driven to the peak of Haleakalā before biking down to the volcano's base and continuing along a road to an end-of-day camp.; Day 2: After flying to the Big Island, teams had to bike from Waimea-Kohala Airport uphill to a helicopter that would take them to the Kohala flume. There, teams had to bodyboard to the end of the channel and rappel down Kulaniapia Falls. After jumping off of the Puueo Bridge, teams had to kayak to a buoy in Hilo Bay with a million-dollar prize.; Winners: Team Southeast Asia
