= Ou River =

Ou River may refer to:

- Ou River, Laos
- Ou River (Zhejiang) (or Oujiang), China
