= Muang Khua =

- Village
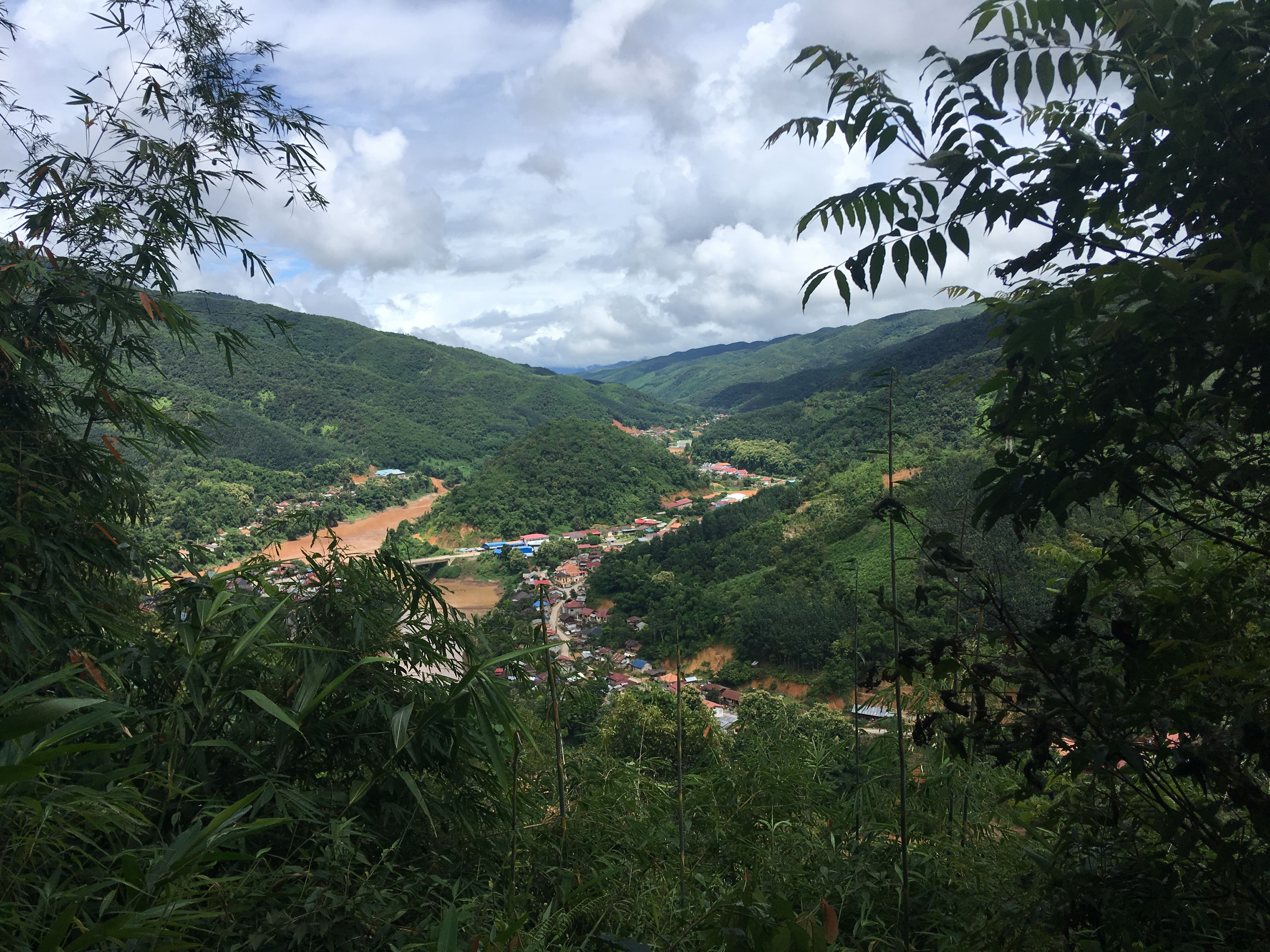
- View of Muang Khua and the Nam Ou.

- Location within Laos
- Coordinates: 21°07′00″N 102°31′00″E
- Country: Laos
- Province: Phongsali
- Time zone: UTC+7 (Laos Standard Time)

Muang Khua is a village in Laos, near the Vietnamese border, in the province of Phongsali.

== Overview ==
Many tourists visit the village, because a bus between Muang Khua and Dien Bien Phu departs here. The best way to get in the village from other parts of the country is by boat over the Nam Ou river.
