= Statue of Notre-Dame-du-Saguenay =

Statue on Cap Trinité, Quebec, Canada

Coordinates: 48°19′21″N 70°19′16″W

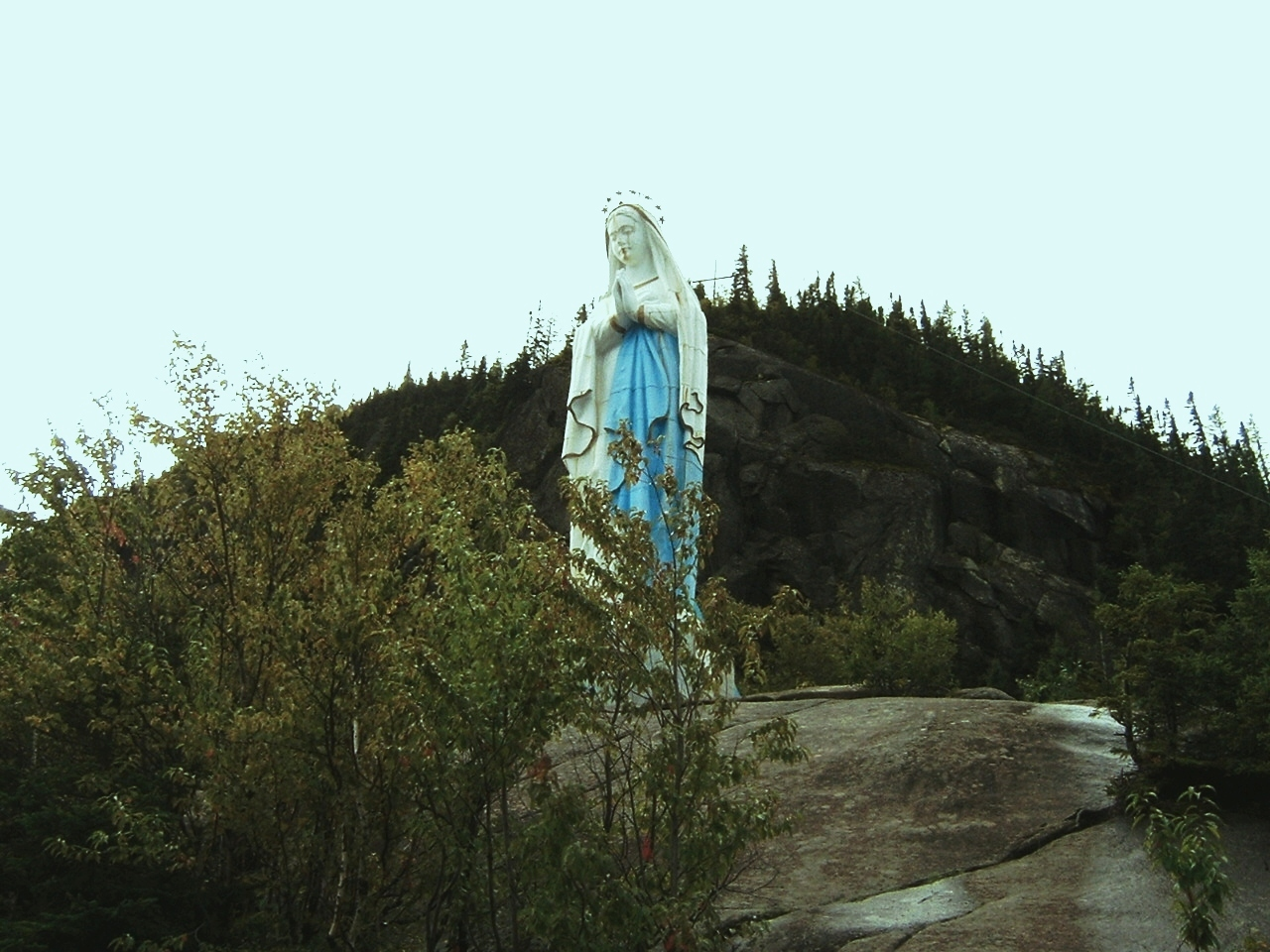
The statue of Notre-Dame-du-Saguenay

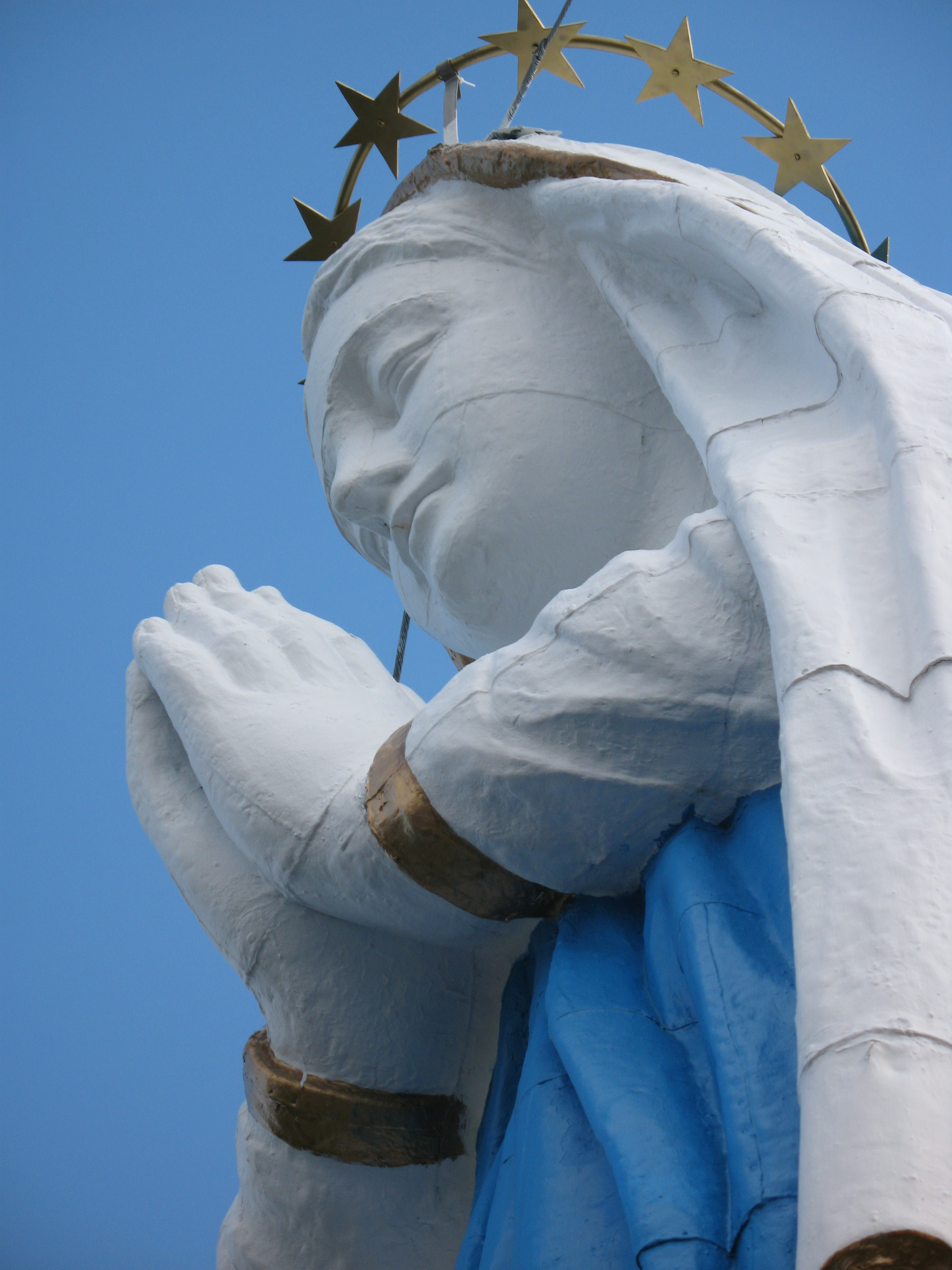
hands clasped

The statue of Notre-Dame-du-Saguenay is a statue located on Cap Trinité, at the mouth of Baie Trinité, near the village of Rivière-Éternité, and the river Saguenay River, in Le Fjord-du-Saguenay Regional County Municipality, in the province of Quebec, in Canada.

== History ==
This statue was sculpted by Louis Jobin in 1881. It is made entirely of white pine and is covered with thin sheets of lead to protect it from the elements. It measures 9 meters high and weighs over 3 tonnes.

== Legend ==
The statue of Notre-Dame-du-Saguenay was sculpted in honor of Sainte-Vierge after the misadventures of "Charles-Napoléon Robitaille", a traveling salesman who, to go to Saguenay, absolutely had to take the rivers.

One winter day when he was heading towards Lac Saint-Jean, the ice broke under his feet and he fell into the water; he struggled but in vain. As a last resort, he asked the Blessed Virgin to come and save him. He was miraculously stranded on the ice further.

== Installation ==
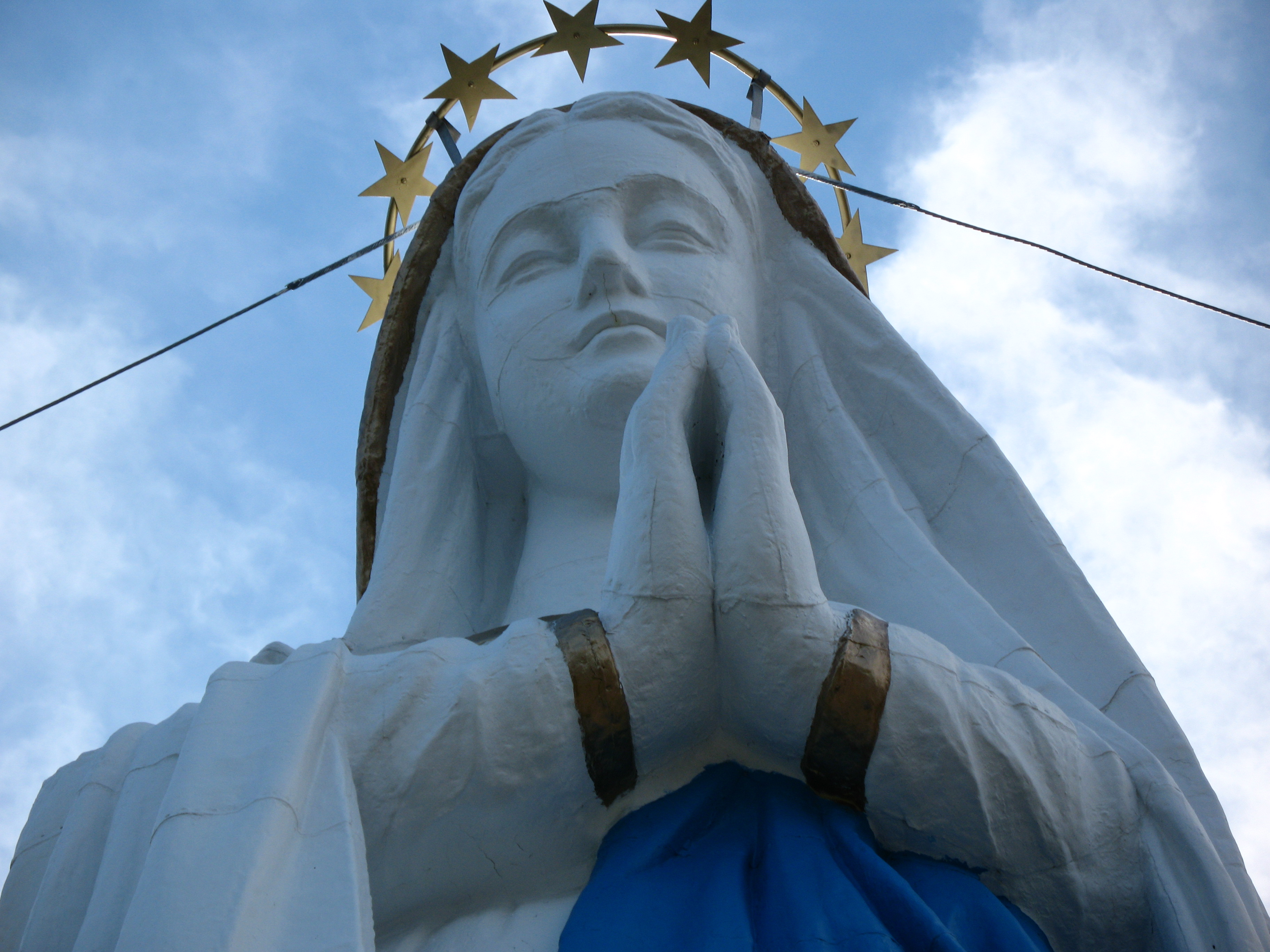
head crowned with golden stars

The Statue Notre-Dame-du-Saguenay begins its journey on August 13. At the Havre de Québec, we load the Notre-Dame-du-Saguenay statue on board the Union steamer from the company St-Laurent, a boat that provides service between Quebec and Chicoutimi.

The steep wall of Cape Trinity making it impossible to dock a boat as imposing as the steamer Union, we leave the statue at L’Anse-Saint-Jean.

Immersed in water, it is then pulled from this place over a distance of about nine miles by two men in a rowboat. The Godin and Desvarennes company from Chicoutimi ascended the Virgin from Cape Trinité. A dozen employees are supervised by foreman Godin. They install wooden beams along the cape as well as a hoist actuating a cable about 50 feet in length that they fix on the side of the mountain. An attempt is made to hoist one of the three parts of the statue for the first time, but the attempt is unsuccessful because the weight is too great. The statue is therefore separated into fourteen pieces, previously assembled by Louis Jobin using wooden dowels, to manage to hoist it.

Slowly, we go up the pieces by raising them one by one 50 feet at a time until the first level of Cape Trinité. Then, the monument is installed on the wooden base which is intended for it. The operation lasted eight days, and no untoward accident was reported.

In 2008, the Center de conservation du Québec restored the statue so that it would return to its original appearance. In the same year, the Royal Canadian Mint issued a 25 cent coin bearing the image of the statue.
