= Cap Trinité =

Rock wall in Quebec, Canada

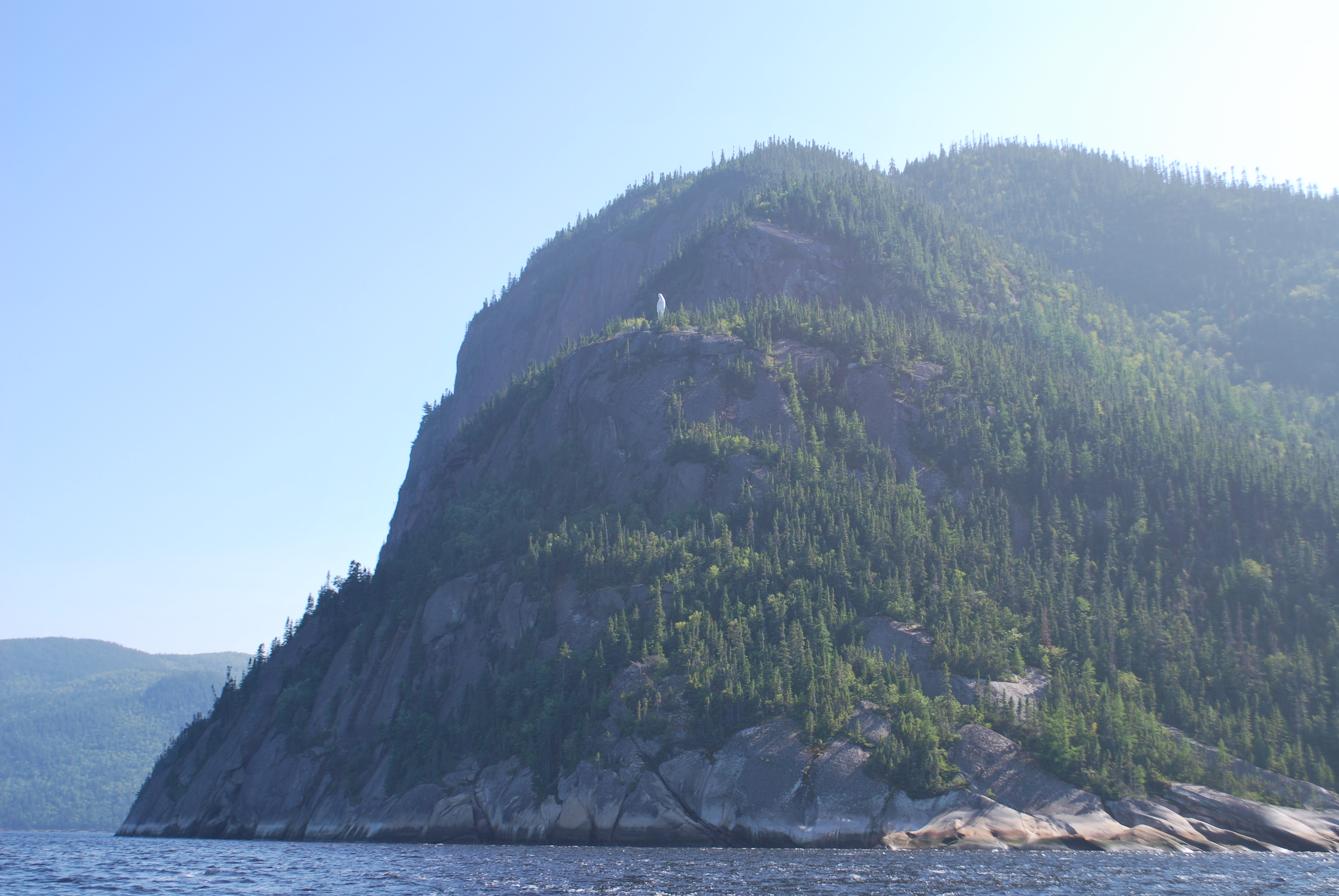
- View of Cap Trinité overlooking the Saguenay

Highest point
- Elevation: 411 m (1,348 ft)
- Coordinates: 48.316°N 70.333°W

Geography
- Country: Canada
- Region: Quebec
- Parent range: Laurentian Plateau

Geology
- Mountain type: Cliff

Climbing
- First ascent: 1967 (rock face)

The cap Trinité is a giant rock wall in three plateaus of the Baie Éternité overhanging the Saguenay River, the Le Fjord-du-Saguenay Regional County Municipality, in Saguenay-Lac-Saint-Jean, in Quebec, Canada. This natural elevation is located in Saguenay Fjord National Park.

The Statue of Notre-Dame-du-Saguenay is located here.

== Toponymy ==
The Commission de toponymie du Québec writes about it: "The origin of the name would be linked to its particular form as described thus Arthur Buies:" Cape Trinité was given its name because it is actually formed by three equal caps of size and elevation, the first of which also includes three caps arranged in echelon and forming like three superimposed stages".

== Geography ==
Cap Trinité is a colossal, sheer rock cliff rising dramatically from the waters of the Saguenay River near the community of Rivière-Éternité. The fjord itself is a deep, submerged valley, or glacial trough, carved out by massive glaciers during the last Ice Age and subsequently flooded by the sea, making it one of the longest and deepest fjords in the world.

The cliff face of Cap Trinité is composed primarily of granitic gneiss, a metamorphic rock that has been subjected to immense heat and pressure, giving the cape its exceptional hardness and steep, resistant structure.

The location's remarkable relief is a result of the Saguenay Graben, a large-scale geological fault system that runs through the region. Tectonic activity along this fault line over millions of years, coupled with the scouring action of glaciers, created the monumental vertical walls characteristic of Cap Trinité.

== History ==
Historically, Cap Trinité has been a navigational and cultural beacon in the Saguenay region.

=== First Nations History ===
The Saguenay Fjord has been inhabited and traversed by Innu and other First Nations peoples for thousands of years. The prominent capes, including Cap Trinité, served as essential landmarks for travel and fishing along the waterway.

=== The Statue of Our Lady of the Saguenay ===
The cape's most famous historical feature is the massive, white Statue of Our Lady of the Saguenay (Notre-Dame-du-Saguenay). The 9-meter (29.5-foot) statue was erected on a natural ledge of the cliff face in 1881. It was commissioned by Charles-Napoléon Robitaille, a local merchant, in gratitude for his survival after being lost in a snowstorm on the frozen fjord in 1878. The statue was hauled up the sheer cliff and assembled on the narrow platform, a feat of engineering and community effort that has cemented its place in Quebecois folklore. The presence of this statue on Cap Trinité has made the site a minor pilgrimage destination and a symbol of local devotion and history.

== Tourism ==
Cape Trinité is the main attraction of Saguenay Fjord National Park.

== In culture ==
=== Legend ===
According to a legend montagnais, the cape Trinité would be the result of the combat between Mayo, the first Montagnais, and of a bad manitou. While he was paddling on the Saguenay, a creature appeared from the river to attack it. Mayo, responding only with his courage, took the creature by the tail and smashed it on the mountain. It was at the third stroke that the beast was crushed, which explains the three levels of the cape. Where the manitou hit the rock, no more vegetation grew.

=== Poetry ===
Louis-Honoré Fréchette wrote, in 1873, a poem titled Le cap Trinité.

It’s an overwhelming boulder with its crest
Above the black waves, and whose powerful forehead
Dominate the fog, and challenge in passing
The wing of the storm and the shock of the downpour.

Huge pan of rock, threatening colossus
Whose flank would taunt the cannonball and the bomb,
Who rises suddenly in the cloud, and falls
In the unfathomable chasm where its base descends.

What caprice erected this dark wall?
Caprice! who knows ? Bold the mocker
These blind efforts at fertility!

This mass feeds a thousand perennial plants;
The mountain swallow nests in its crevices;
And the fierce monster has its authorship.

Charles Gill was also inspired by the Saguenay capes. The song VIII^{e} of the collection "Le Cap Éternité followed des Étoiles filantes", entitled "Le Cap Trinité", begins as follows:

This rock which of God shows majesty,
Who draws up on the sky his three enormous bleachers,
And vertically divides its shapes into three,
It deserves three times its name of Trinity.

Its vertiginous side, scarred with scars
And full of harsh reliefs touched by the sun,
To the sacred grimoires of Egypt is the same,
When the light and the shadow mix their whims.

Browns, grays, golds, tender purples,
To these precise signs are added more vague features,
And the heavenly azure floats there according to the waves,
Who in the deep folds dart their cheerful reflections.

Is it some Titan, is it rather lightning,
Who wanted to print the word "always" here?
What meaning do these strange contours conceal?
For posterity what problem to solve

== Photo gallery ==
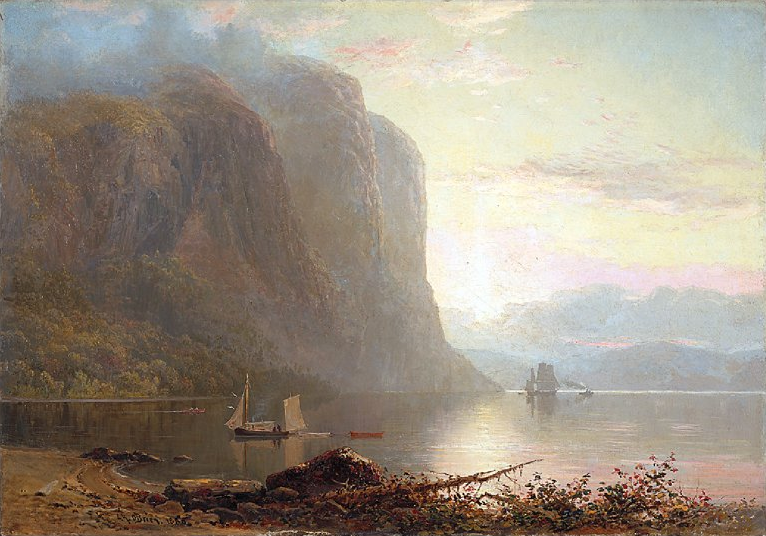
Lucius O'Brien, Sunrise over the Saguenay, 1880

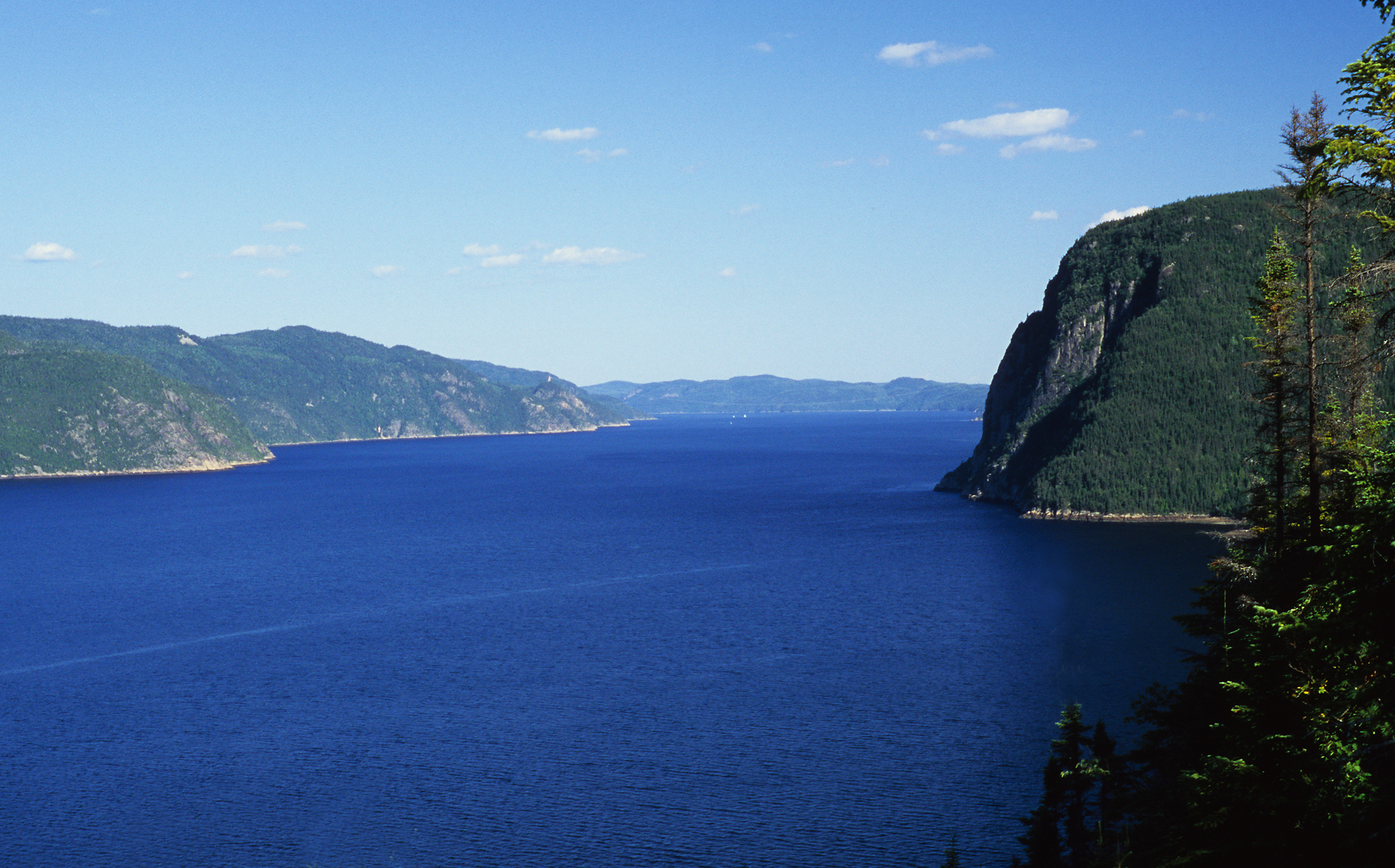
The Saguenay River and the Cap Éternité seen from the first level of Cape Trinity near the Statue of Notre-Dame-du-Saguenay

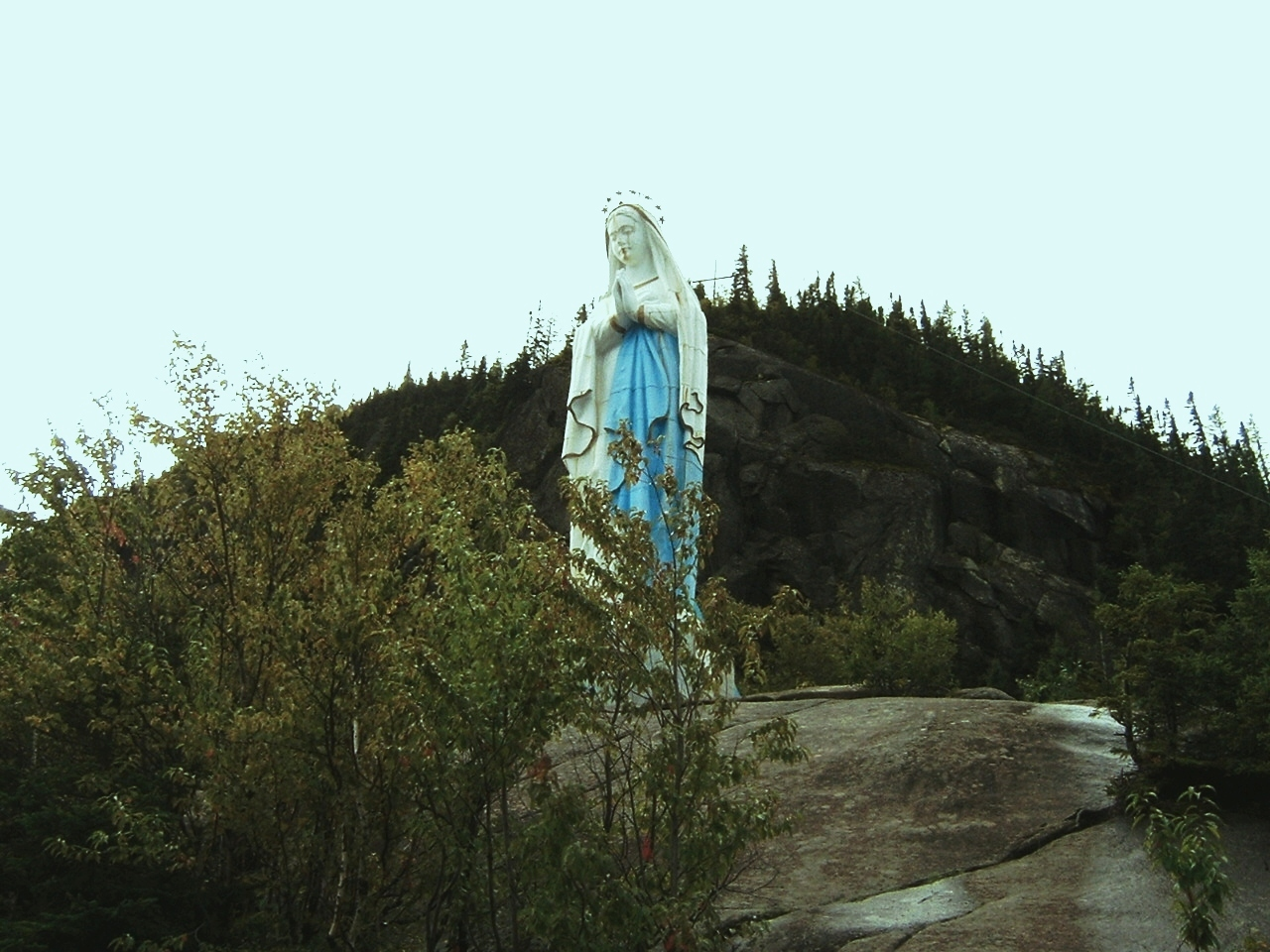
The statue of Notre-Dame-du-Saguenay

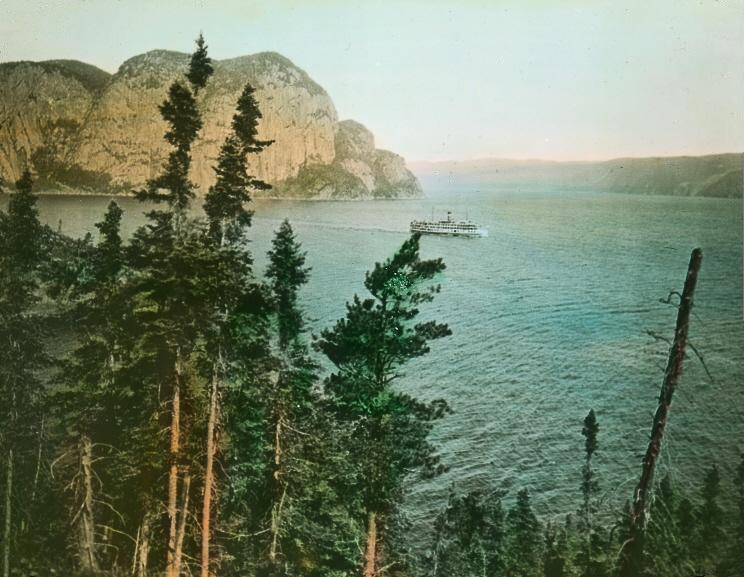
Cap Trinité, around 1933

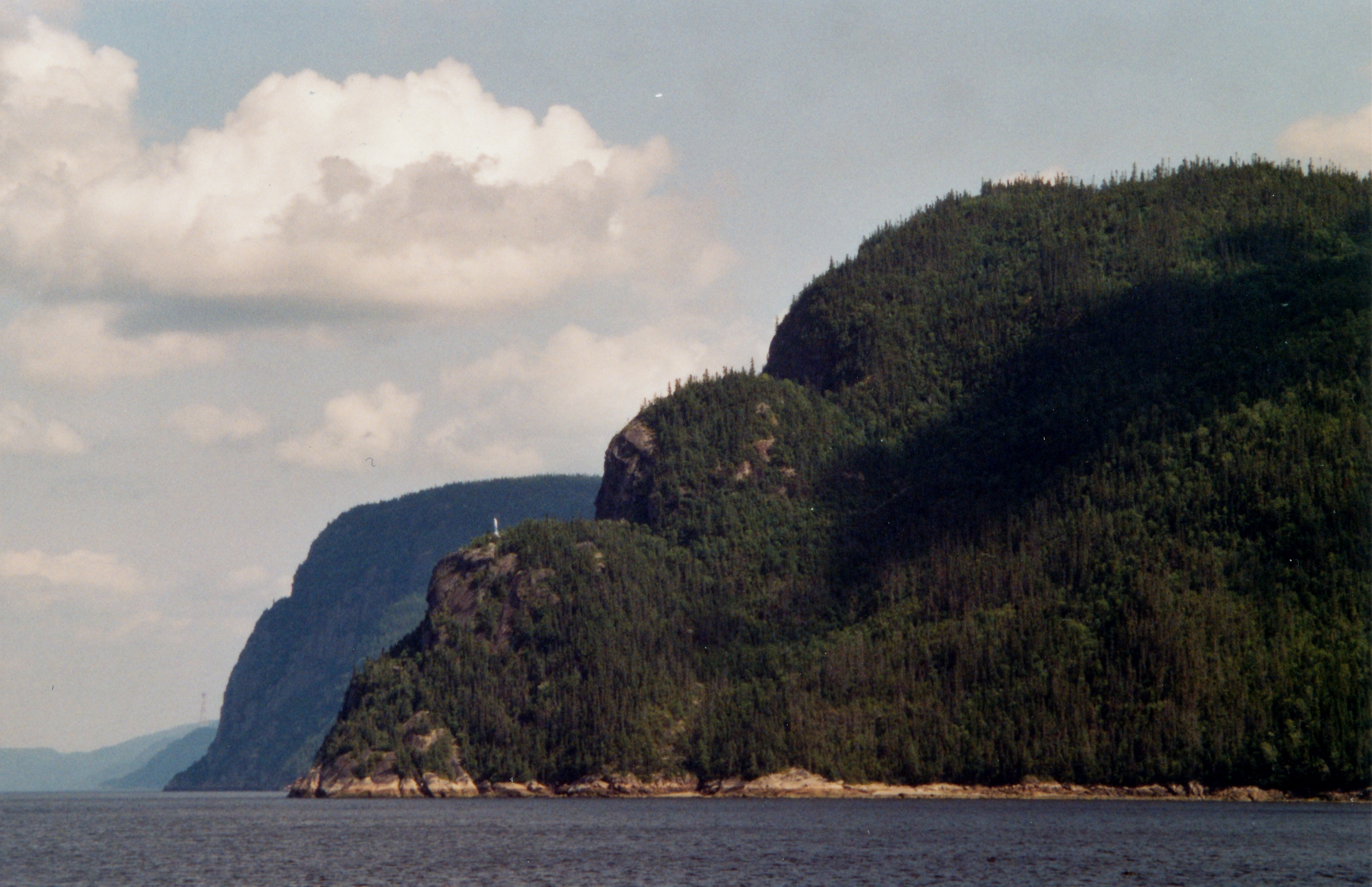
Cap Éternité in the background, and the three levels of Cap Trinité in the foreground

Click on images to enlarge

== See also ==
- Saguenay Fjord National Park
