= Luang Prabang province =

Province of Laos

Luang Prabang province ແຂວງຫລວງພະບາງ
- Province
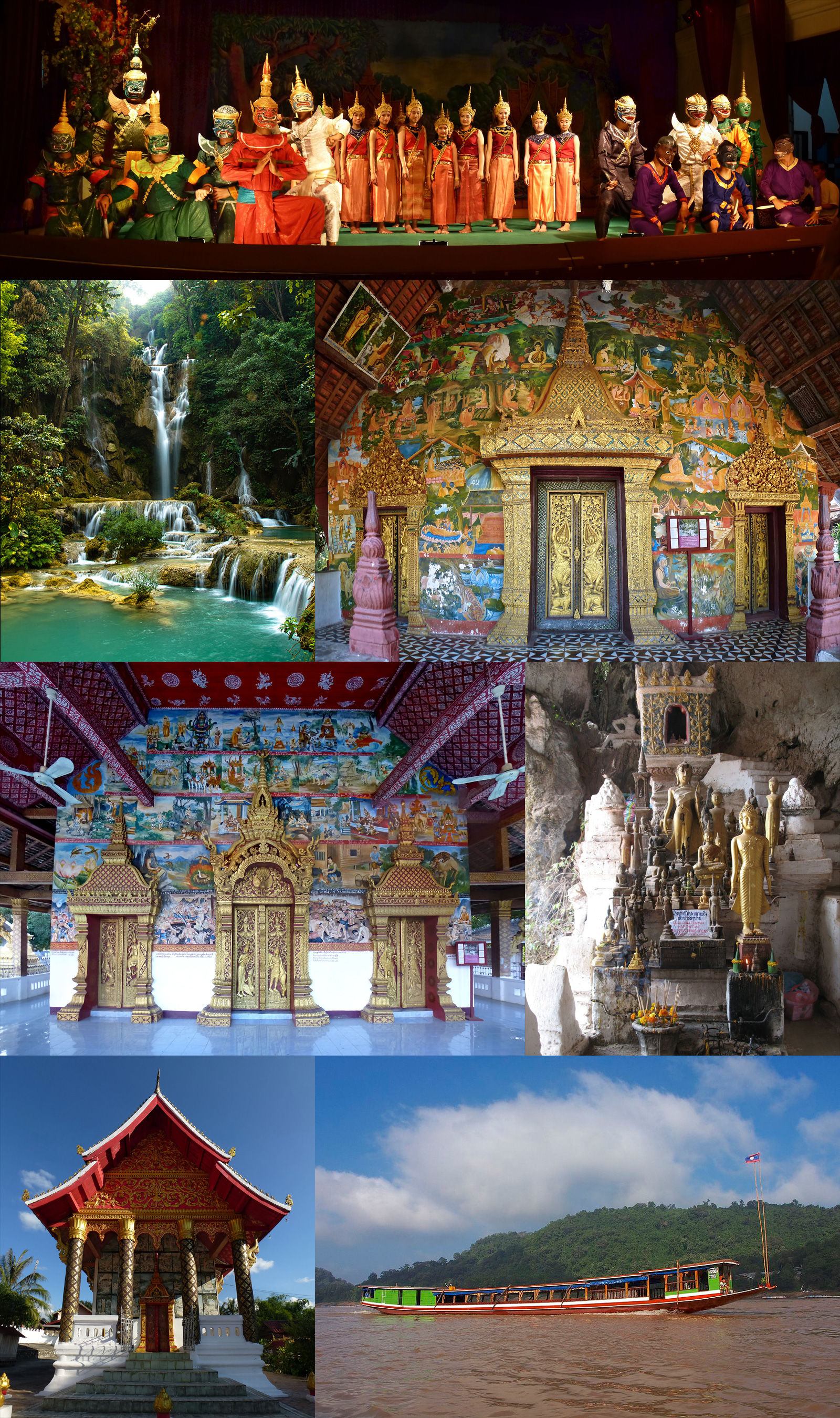

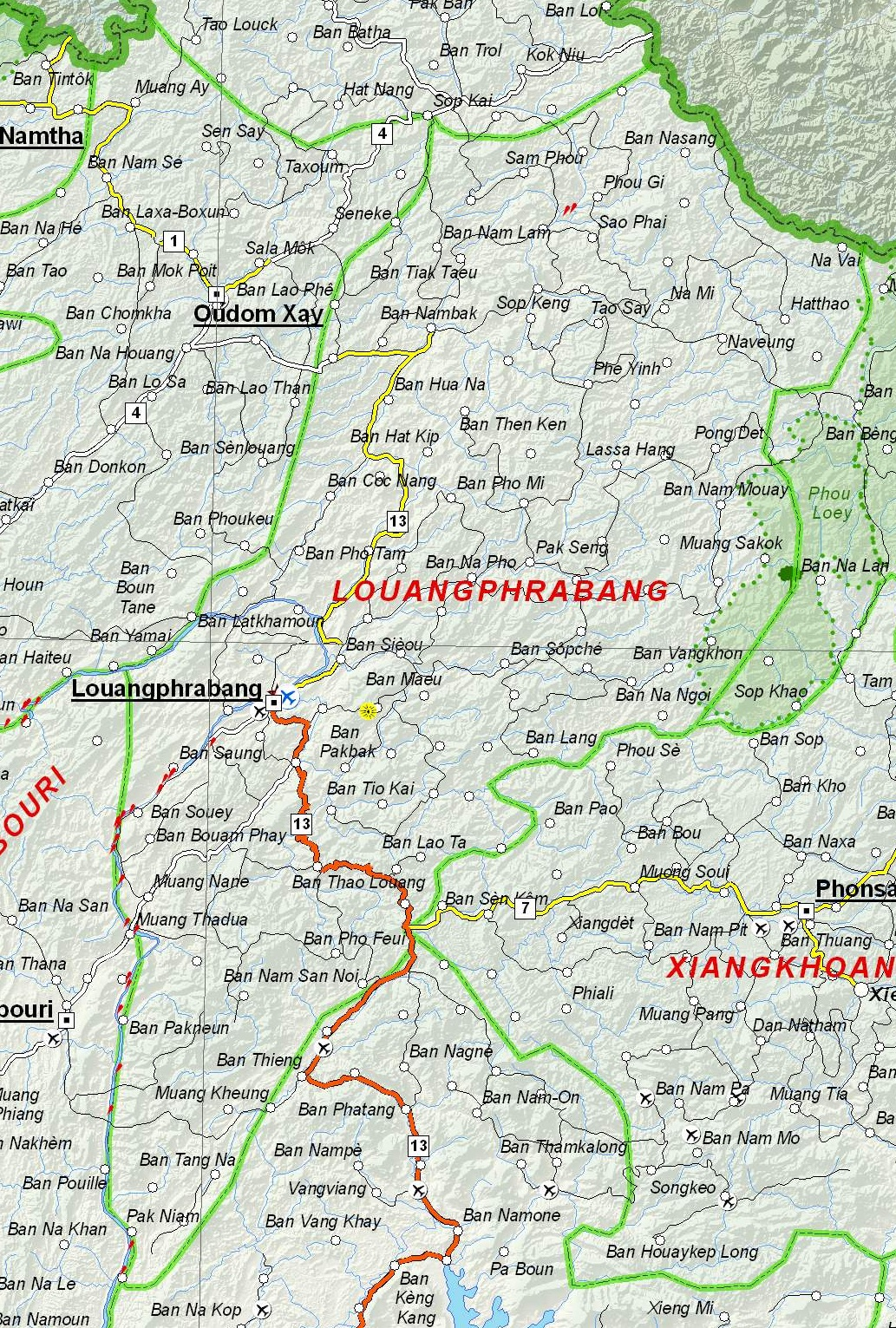
- Map of Luang Prabang province

- Location of Luang Prabang province in Laos
- Coordinates: 20.21°N 102.62°E
- Country: Laos
- Capital: Luang Prabang

Area
  - Total: 16,875 km^{2} (6,515 sq mi)

Population (2020 census)
  - Total: 467,157
  - Density: 27.683/km^{2} (71.700/sq mi)
- Time zone: UTC+7 (ICT)
- ISO 3166 code: LA-LP
- HDI (2022): ▲0.605 medium · 7th

UNESCO World Heritage Site
- Official name: Town of Luang Prabang
- Criteria: Cultural: (ii)(iv)(v)
- Reference: 479bis
- Inscription: 1995 (19th Session)
- Extensions: 2013
- Area: 820 ha (2,000 acres)
- Buffer zone: 12,560 ha (31,000 acres)

Luang Prabang (also Louangphabang, Lao: ຫລວງພະບາງ, pronounced [lǔaŋ pʰā(ʔ).bàːŋ]) is a province in northern Laos. Its capital of the same name, Luang Prabang, was the capital of the Lan Xang Kingdom during the 13th to 16th centuries. It is listed since 1995 by UNESCO as a World Heritage Site for unique architectural, religious and cultural heritage, a blend of the rural and urban developments over centuries, including the French colonial influences during the 19th and 20th centuries. The province has 12 districts.

== Geography ==
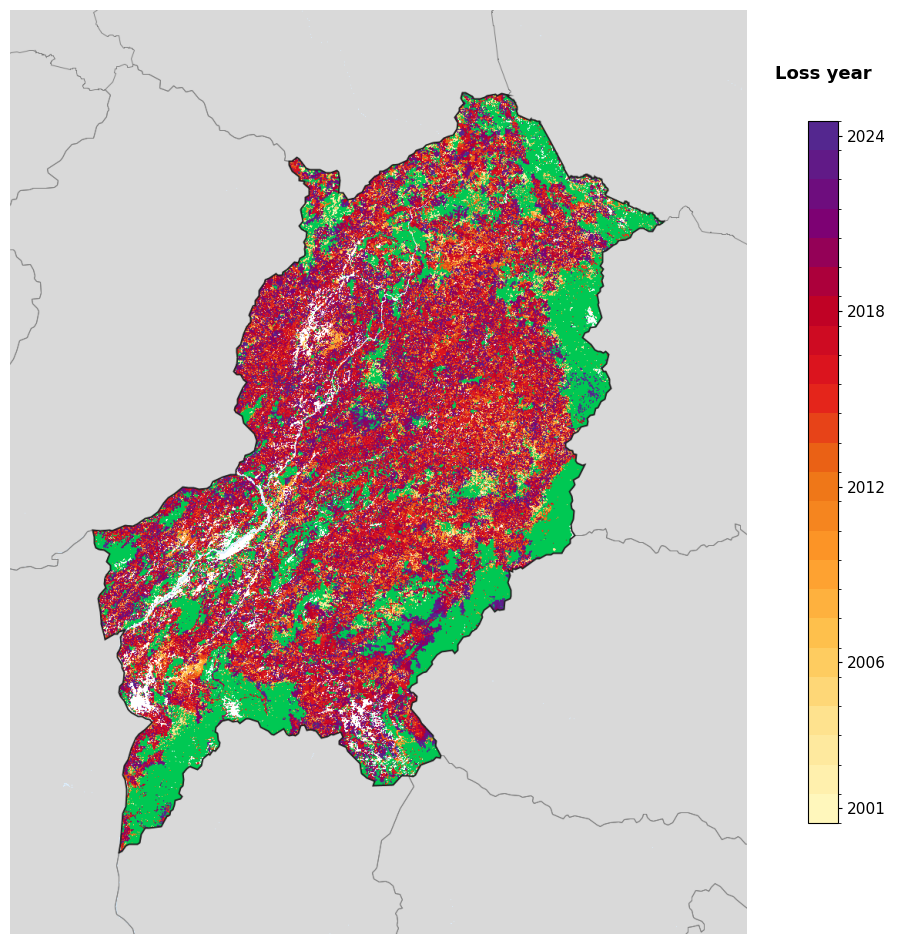
Tree-cover loss year in Luang Prabang, 2001-2024, from the Global Forest Change dataset.

Luang Prabang province covers an area of 16,875 square kilometres (6,515 sq mi). The province borders Phongsaly province to the north, Vietnam to the northeast, Houaphanh province to the east, Xiangkhouang province to the southeast, Vientiane province to the south, Sainyabuli province to the southwest, and Oudomxay province to the west. The capital is on a peninsula that bisects the conjunction of the Mekong River, flowing south along the west side of the city, and the Nam Khan, a tributary of the Mekong that flows from the east but angles north just before the confluence of the 2 rivers. The tip of the peninsula is the site of a wat that was frequented by the royal family when it resided there, and is a site of devotion for local Buddhists and tourists. In the center of the peninsula is a hill, Phousi, which is 150 metres (490 ft) high. Stairs lead to a shrine and an overlook of the city and the rivers.

=== Protected areas ===
The 60,070 hectare Phou Louey Massif Important Bird Area (IBA) is in the Nam Et-Phou Louey National Biodiversity Conservation Area (NBCA). The IBA is in the provinces of Luang Prabang and Houaphanh. It sits at an elevation of 700–1,800 metres (2,300–5,900 ft). The habitat contains mixed deciduous forest, semi-evergreen forest, lower montane evergreen forest, upper montane evergreen forest, and secondary grassland. Avifauna include beautiful nuthatch Sitta formosa, Blyth's kingfisher Alcedo hercules, rufous-necked hornbill Aceros nipalensis, and yellow-vented warbler Phylloscopus cantator.

The Phou Loei Protected Reserve (PLI) encompassing an area of 1,465 square kilometres (566 sq mi), lies in Luang Prabang and Houaphanh provinces. It was established in 1993. Its topography is rugged highlands with elevations ranging between 500–2,257 metres (1,640–7,405 ft). It is drained by the Nam Khan and Nam Xuang Rivers, which flow primarily to the southwest. The reserve is 87% forested, mixed deciduous and evergreens with an abundance of bamboo and grasslands resulting from shifting cultivation. Fauna in the reserve are mainly clouded leopard, tiger, and leopard, and large cats which are endemic to Indochina. Route 7 and Route 1 are the roads leading to the reserve; the former from Phonsavan and the latter from Meuang Hiam, while its northern area has a seasonal road; access is available from Luang Prabang.

=== Administrative divisions ===
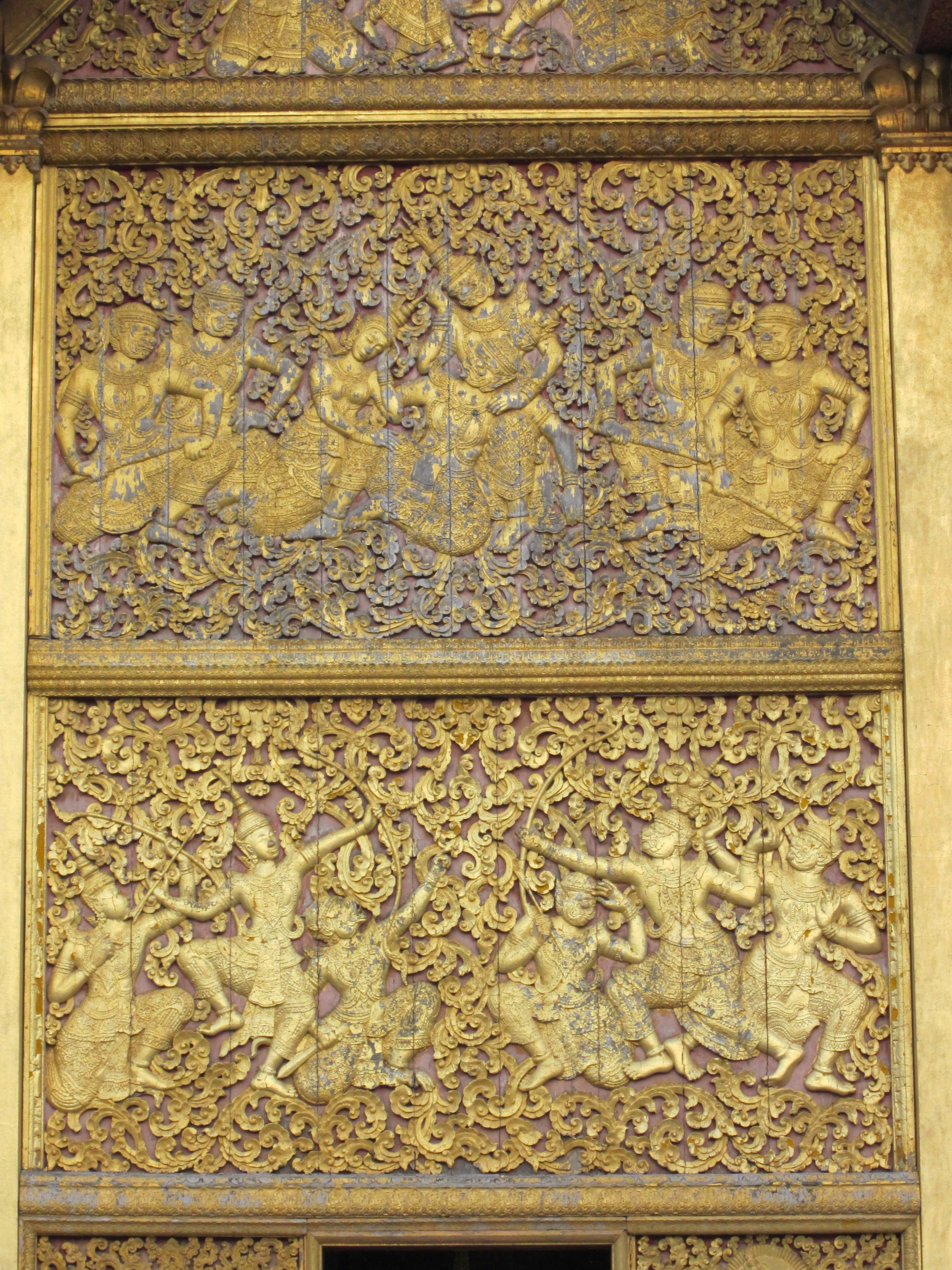
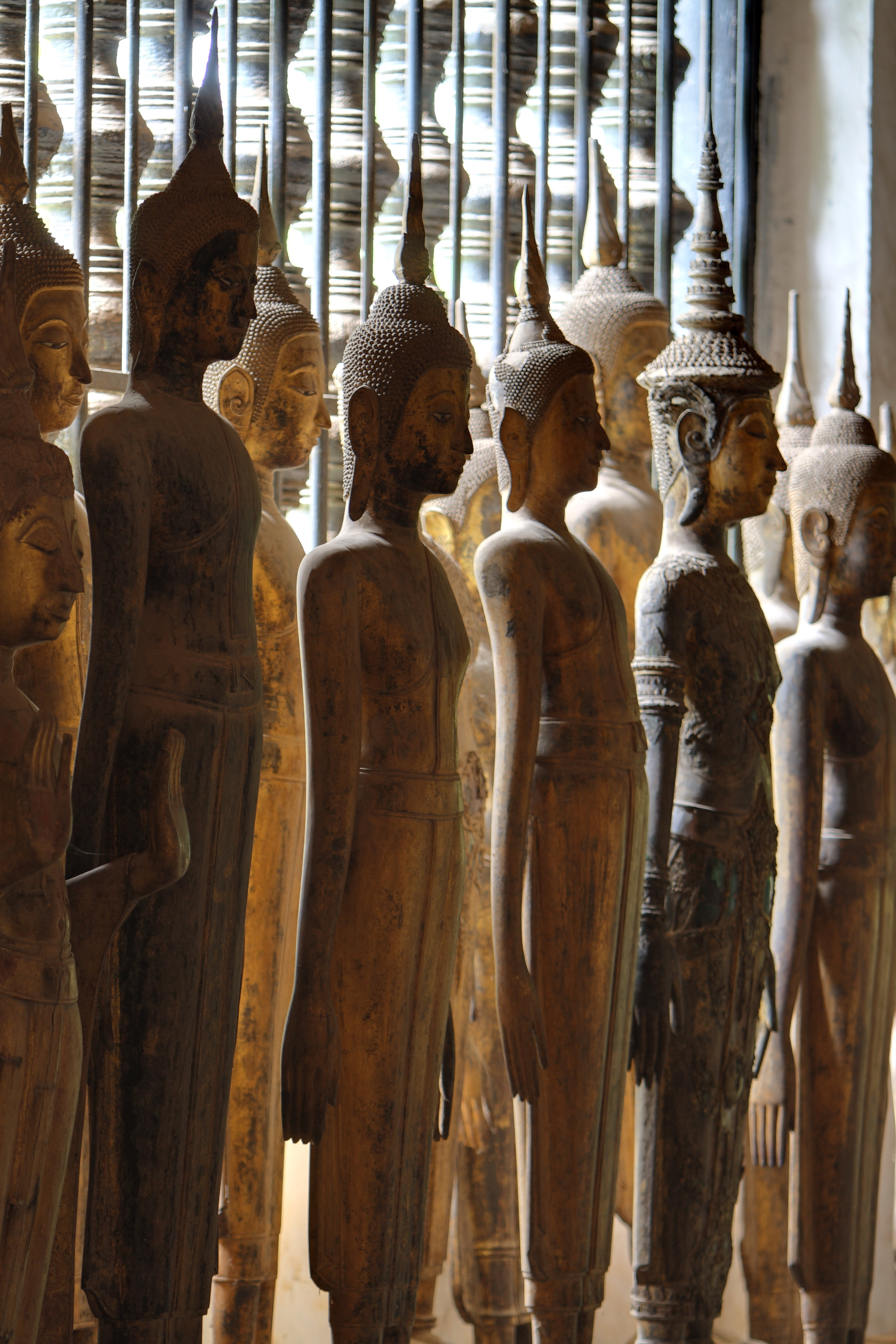
Left: Gilded carved wood above main door of the Golden Stupa. Right: Buddha statues at Wat Wisunarat

The province is made up of the following 12 districts:

Map	Code	Name	Lao script	Population (2015)
	6-01	Luang Prabang District	ເມືອງຫຼວງພະບາງ	90,313
	6-02	Xiengngeun District	ເມືອງຊຽງເງິນ	33,395
	6-03	Nane District	ເມືອງນານ	28,130
	6-04	Pak Ou District	ເມືອງປາກອູ	25,823
	6-05	Nam Bak District	ເມືອງນ້ຳບາກ	68,863
	6-06	Ngoy District	ເມືອງງອຍ	29,692
	6-07	Pak Seng District	ເມືອງປາກແຊງ	22,159
	6-08	Phonxay District	ເມືອງໂພນໄຊ	32,577
	6-09	Chomphet District	ເມືອງຈອມເພັດ	30,076
	6-10	Viengkham District	ເມືອງວຽງຄຳ	28,557
	6-11	Phoukhoune District	ເມືອງພູຄູນ	23,211
	6-12	Phonthong District	ເມືອງໂພນທອງ	19,093

== History ==
Luang Prabang is the capital of Lan Xang and is founded approximately 1,200 years ago. It was previously known by 2 other names, Muang Sawa (or Muang Sua) and Xieng Dong Xieng Thong. It became the first capital of Laos in the 14th century when King Fa Ngum returned from Cambodia where he and his father were exiled by the previous king, Fa Ngum's grandfather. Fa Ngum had the support of the Khmer Kingdom centered at Siem Reap and brought with him thousands of soldiers to assist in establishing his own kingdom. Luang Prabang was known as Muang Sua around the 11th century, and the settlement's name was changed after Cambodia gave a gold image of the Buddha, the Phra Bang, as a gift. The Phra Bang became the symbol of the city, and the Buddha image is on display at the museum. Nan-chao occupied Muang Sua in 709 and its princes or administrators replaced the Tai aristocracy. The occupation probably ended before the Khmer empire's northward expansion under Indravarman I (r. 877–889).

The Khmers founded an outpost at Xay Fong near Vientiane. The Champa expansion occurred in southern Laos through 1070. Chanthaphanit, the ruler of Xay Fong, invaded Muang Sua and was accepted as ruler with the departure of the Nan-chao administrators. The dynasty had troubles with principalities, leading to Khun Chuang, who may have been a Kammu tribesman, extending his territory to Muang Sua and ruling from 1128 to 1170. The family of Khun Chuang reinstituted the Siamese administrative system of the 7th century. The territory experienced a period of Khmer suzerainty under Jayavarman VII from 1185 to 1191. After the town became the center of a localized kingdom in the 13th century, it became known by the Tai name Xieng Dong Xieng Thong, which in 1353 became the capital of Lan Xang. The capital was moved in 1560 by King Setthathirath I to Vientiane, at which time, Xieng Dong Xieng Thong was renamed Luang Prabang, meaning "City of the Lord (Buddha) of Fine Gold", in recognition of the Phra Bang gift received centuries earlier.

After Lan Xang had troubles in 1707, Luang Prabang became the capital of the independent Luang Prabang Kingdom. When France annexed Laos, the French recognised Luang Prabang as the royal residence of Laos. Eventually, the ruler of Luang Prabang became synonymous with the figurehead of the French Protectorate of Laos. When Laos achieved independence, the king of Luang Prabang, Sisavang Vong, became the head of state for the Kingdom of Laos. In 1941, following the Franco-Thai War, Thailand occupied part of the province, which was named Lan Chang province. On 9 March 1945, independence was declared for Laos, and Luang Prabang was the capital. Colonel Hans Imfeld, commissioner of the French Republic, entered Luang Prabang on 25 August 1945 with a party of Franco-Laotian guerrillas and received assurances from the king that the protectorate was still in force. After the Washington Accord of 1946, the Thai government ceded the annexed territories of Luang Prabang and Sainyabuli provinces back to Laos.

== Demographics ==
The population of the province as of the March 2015 census was 431,889.

== Landmarks ==
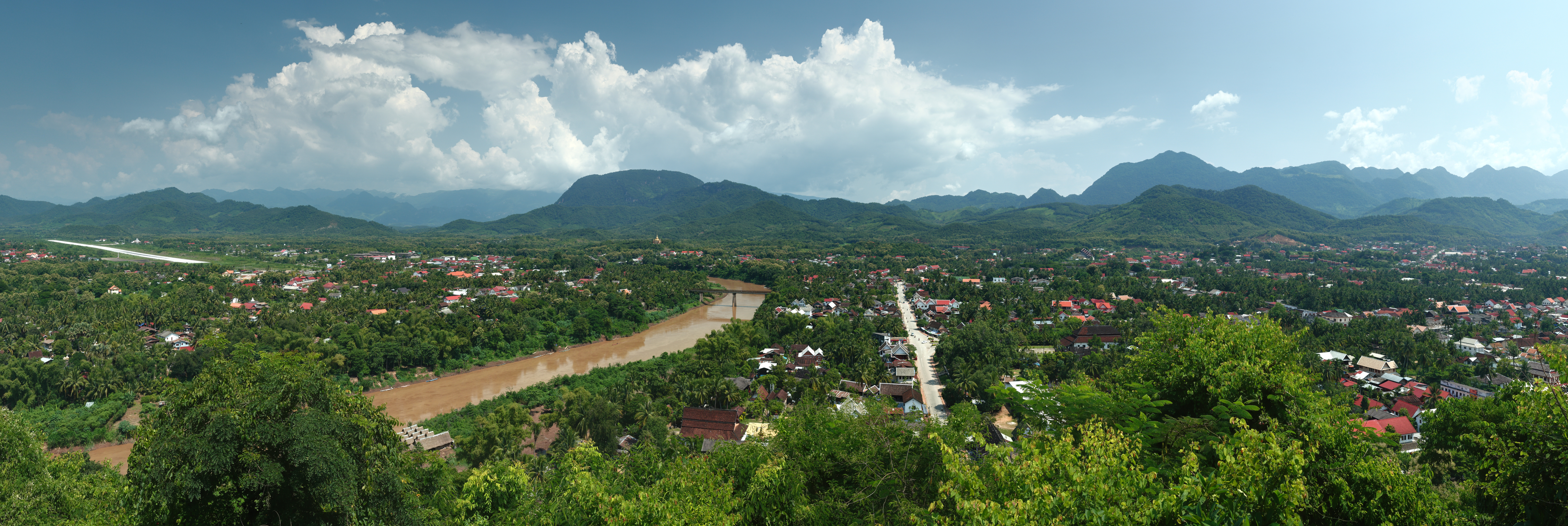
Luang Prabang

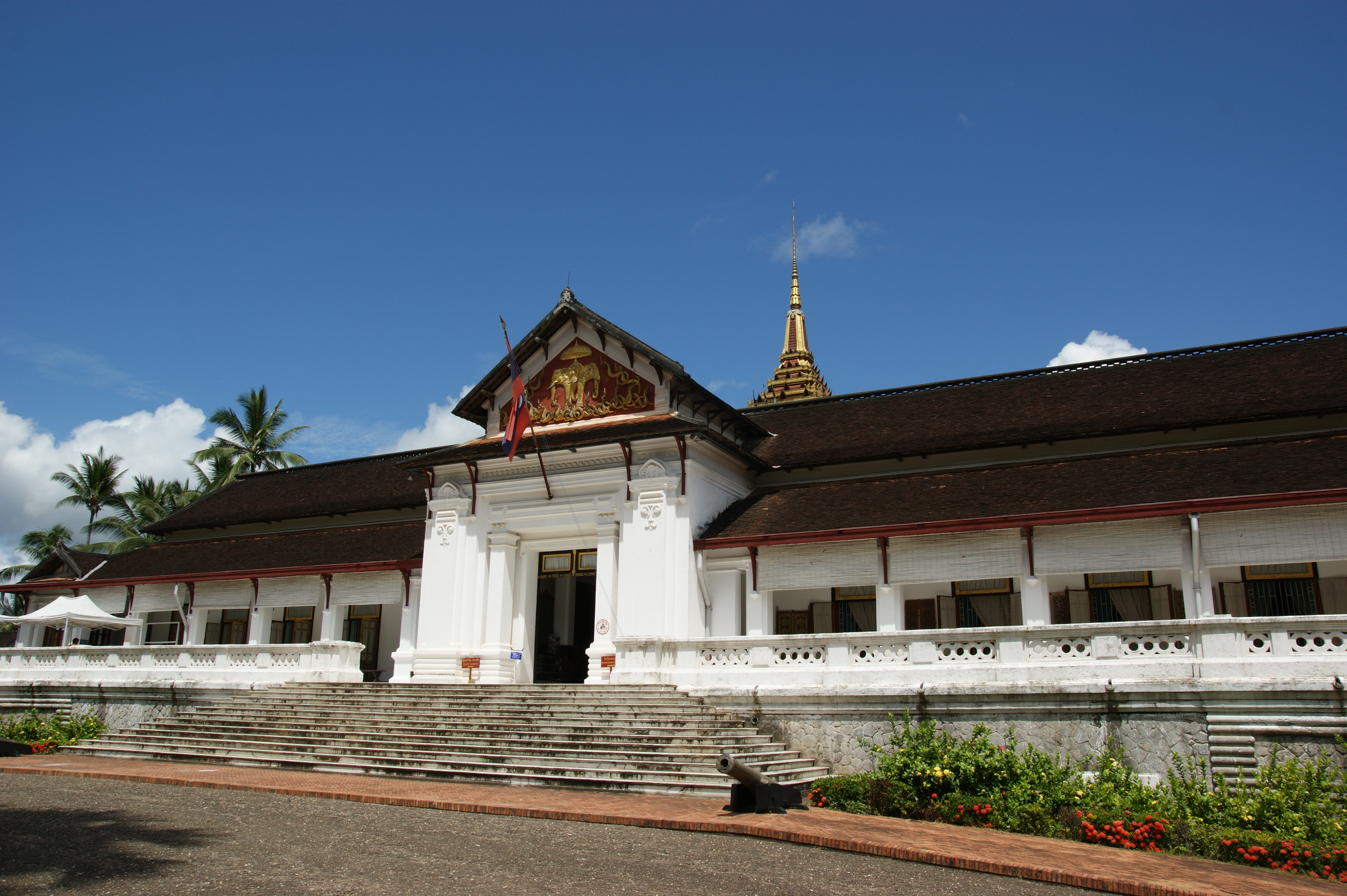
Haw Kham Royal Palace

The capital city of Luang Prabang became a World Heritage Site in 1995. According to a legend, Buddha visited this place and predicted that it would become a rich and prosperous city. It was in the following centuries that it became the capital of the Kingdom of Lan Xang, and the centre of Buddhism. The city developed with royal administrative complexes amidst temples and monasteries.

The National Museum, built in 1904, has exhibits of royal religious artifacts in the entrance hall, and a Moon rock. The 14th century gold Phra Bang has rendered its name to the province.

=== Temples ===
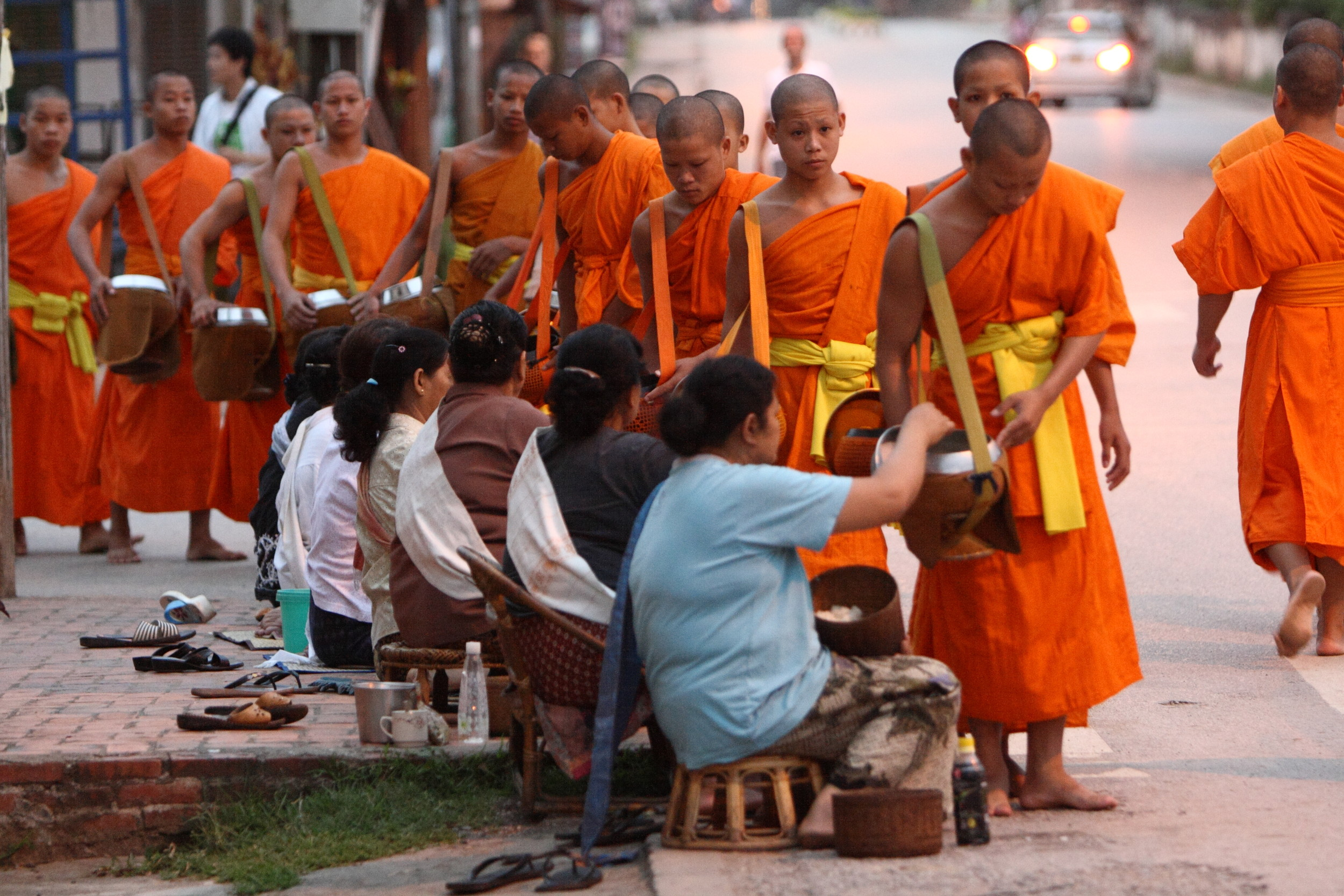
The monks' alms procession at dawn includes receiving sticky rice.

There are landmark temples in the provincial capital city. Wat Wisunarat has a watermelon-shaped stupa, while Wat Xieng Muan has a Buddhist art school. Wat Manorom, the 6 metres (20 ft) tall, bronze, sitting Buddha, built in 1382, was damaged in 1887, and was renovated in 1919 and in 1971. Wat That Luang, originally established in the 3rd century BC by Ashokan missionaries, is the traditional cremation place for Lao royalty. Steps from Wat Phabaht lead to a footprint. Wat Xieng Maen, founded in 1592, housed the Pha Bang for 7 nights after decades in Thai hands. Wat Chomphet, established in 1888, is accessed via a stairway of 123 steps, and contains 2 pagodas. Wat Manorom contains a 6 metres (20 ft) tall, bronze, sitting Buddha.

Wat Xieng Thong temple was built in the 16th century (1559–1560) during the reign of King Saysetthathirath, at the confluence of the Mekong and Nam Khan rivers. Its notability within the country and in Asia is credited to its Buddhist art and architecture. An artifact of funerary nature kept in the temple complex is a carved and gilded funeral vehicle of the former king, and the remains of King Sisavangvon. Royal ceremonies were held here until 1975. The wat has carved gilded, wooden doors which depict scenes from Buddha's life. The ceiling in the sim displays Dharmachakras, dharma wheels symbolising Buddhist law and the circle of reincarnation. The outer walls of the sim depict Lao legends, and the rear gable is decorated with a glass mosaic depicting the tree of life. The outer walls of the Sanctuary of the Reclining Buddha, also known as the Red Chapel, are decorated with mosaics.

== Culture ==
The Vun Pi Mai festival occurs in April to celebrate the Lao New Year. The celebration includes Tak Bat, monks' alms procession, which passes by the Wat Ho Siang. The Royal Lao Ballet performs at the Phrolak-Phralam Theatre on the Royal Palace Grounds in the provincial capital.
