= Nam Ou =

River in Laos

Coordinates: 20°03′N 102°13′E

The Nam Ou (Laotian: ນ້ຳອູ [nâːm ùː], literally: "rice bowl river") is one of the most important rivers of Laos. It runs 448 km from Phongsaly Province to Luang Prabang Province. The river rises in Muang Ou Nua near the Lao-Chinese border, and traverses the northern Laos mountains and gorges until meeting the Mekong River in Ban Pak Ou. Along with the Mekong, the Nam Ou is the only natural channel suitable for large-draft boat transportation. The Nam Ou is one of the 12 principal tributaries of the Mekong River. The river has a total area of nearly 26,000 km^{2}. Near its confluence with the Mekong are the Pak Ou Caves, famous for their Buddha statues. The river is also surrounded by limestone karts, forests, and valleys. The river supports Lao rice cultivation. The Nam Ou placed in the top 80th percentile for river health according to the Mekong River Commission's aquatic health index.

== Ecology ==
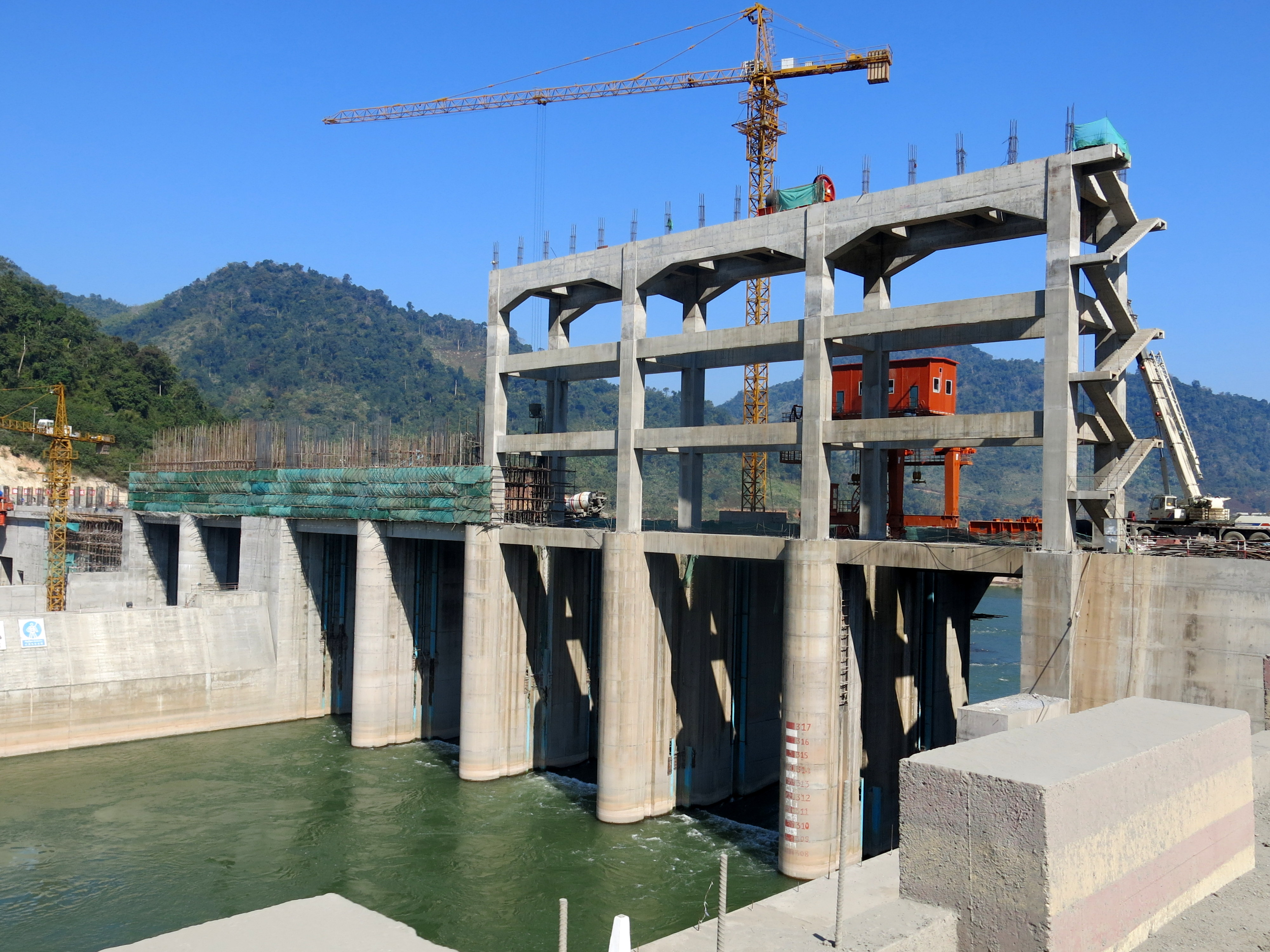
Dam construction at Nam Ou River

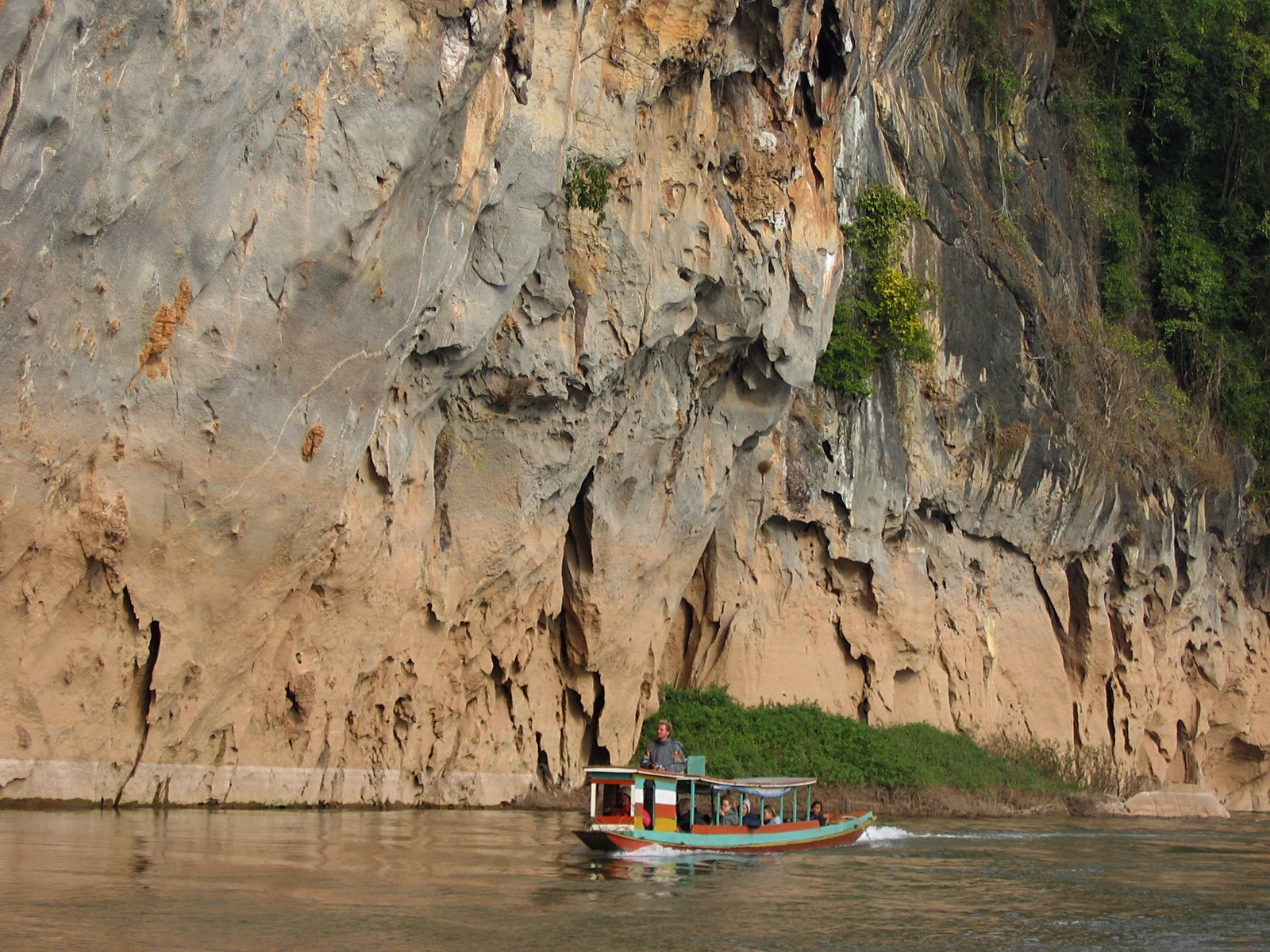
A ferryboat between Nong Kiau and Luang Prabang

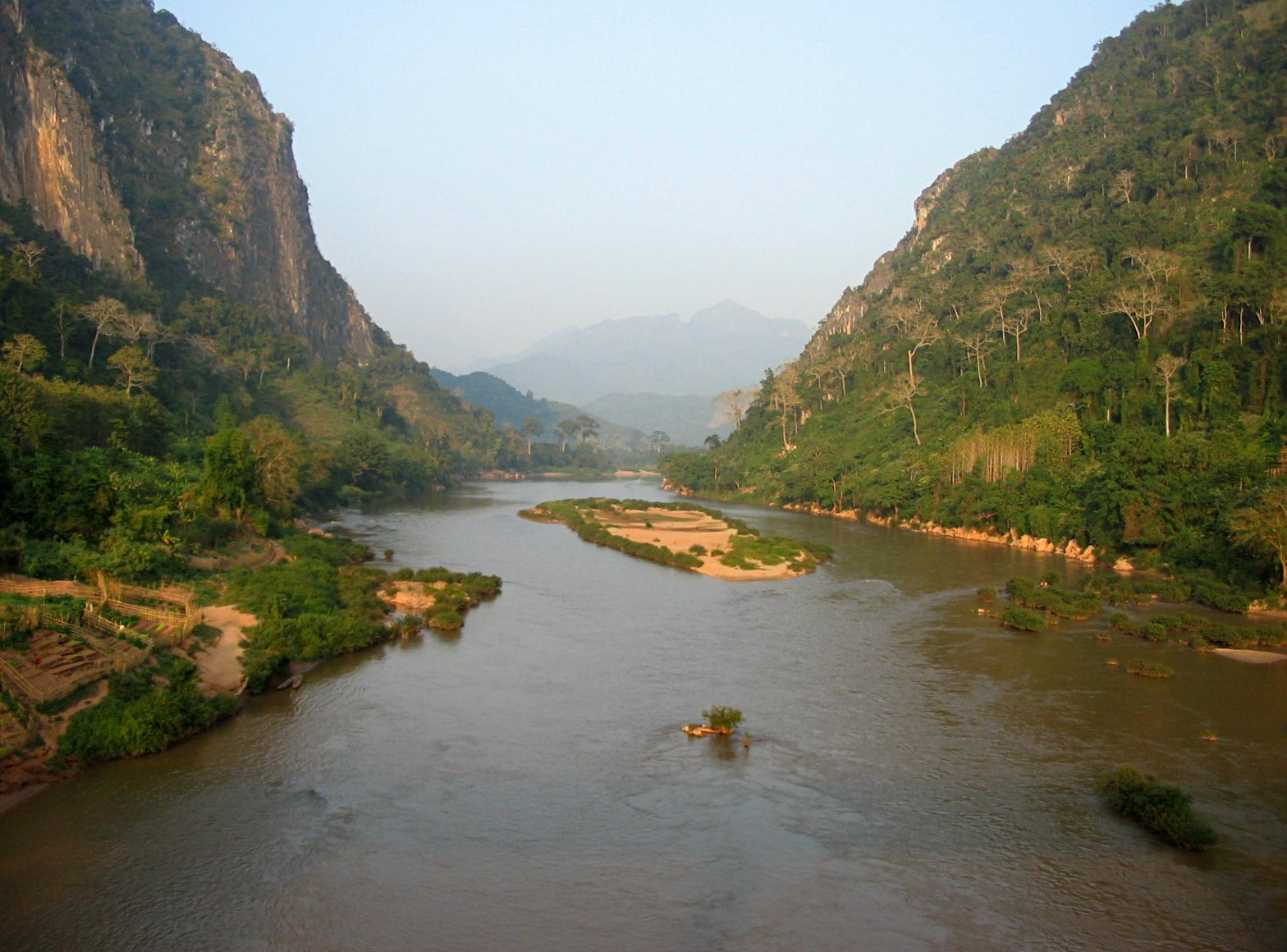
The Nam Ou is an important transportation route in Laos.

The Nam Ou river provides a habitat for 84 species of fish, with 29 of these species inhabiting the Nam Ou exclusively. The northern portion of the river flows through Phou Den Din National Protected Area (NPA) which is home to Asian elephants, Indochinese tigers, white-cheeked gibbons and large antlered muntjac – all endangered species. The river also provides a habitat to riverine birds, otters, and reptiles, with many categorized as endangered by the IUCN Red List.

== Cultural importance ==
Different ethnic minorities' villages with generations of history are located on the river and rely on the river for survival. This includes collecting resources from the river and surrounding forests for income, food, and spiritual practices. The river and surrounding villages have also become a tourist destination for hikers, tour groups, and kayakers.

The Phonsaly province of Laos is home to three main ethnic groups: the Khmu, who account for 22% of the population; the Songsiri (18%); and the Akha (27%). The Khmu are the largest ethnic group in Oudomxay, at 59% of the population; the Lue account for 10% of the population; and the Hmong make up 14% of the provincial population. The Khmu are also the main ethnic group in Luang Prabang, with 47% of the population; the Lao ethnic group makes up 29% of the population; and the Hmong account for 16% of the population. All six of these ethnic groups have different geographical origins, spiritual and religious practices, and occupational preferences/expertise.

== Development ==
The Nam Ou River is the site of the Nam Ou river cascade project, a series of seven dams at different sites along the river. 89 villages surrounding the river are expected to be relocated by the project. There are concerns that the project may have a negative impact on local animal and plant species.

Development on the Nam Ou river and other hydropower projects on other tributaries or directly on the Mekong River have affected the river and surrounding land. The Mekong River Commission has occupied a precarious position of asking for patience to assess the consequences of hydropower projects while also previously stating the abundance of hydropower projects in the region may negatively affect river ecosystems and river sustainability. Thousands of Laotian villagers have been relocated as a result of hydropower development projects. Villagers in areas affected by hydropower projects are relocated by the Laotian government. Resettlement sites often include modernized towns with nearby amenities like roads, bridges, temples, trading markets, health centers and schools. Some of these have been built by contractors and developers of hydropower projects. Some villagers have trouble readjusting to new locations because they lose access to fish, river-bank gardens, and edible river vegetation.
