= Kuang Si Falls =

Waterfall in Luang Prabang, Laos

Coordinates: 19°44′57″N 101°59′30″E

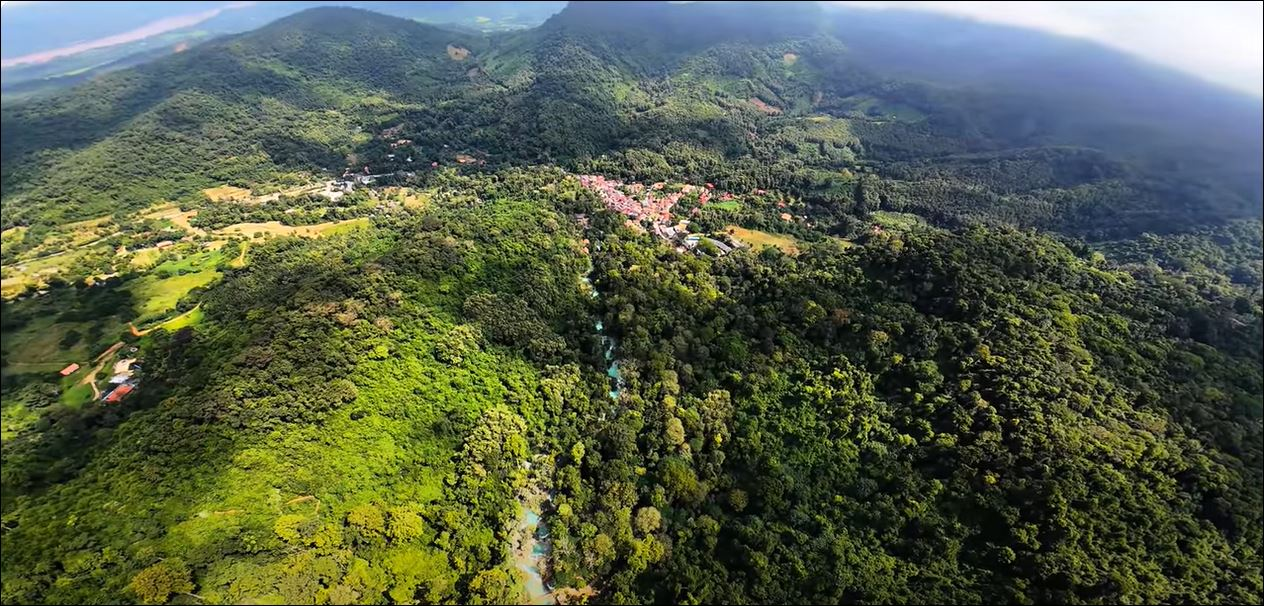
The river of Kuang Si waterfalls, Luang Prabang, Laos

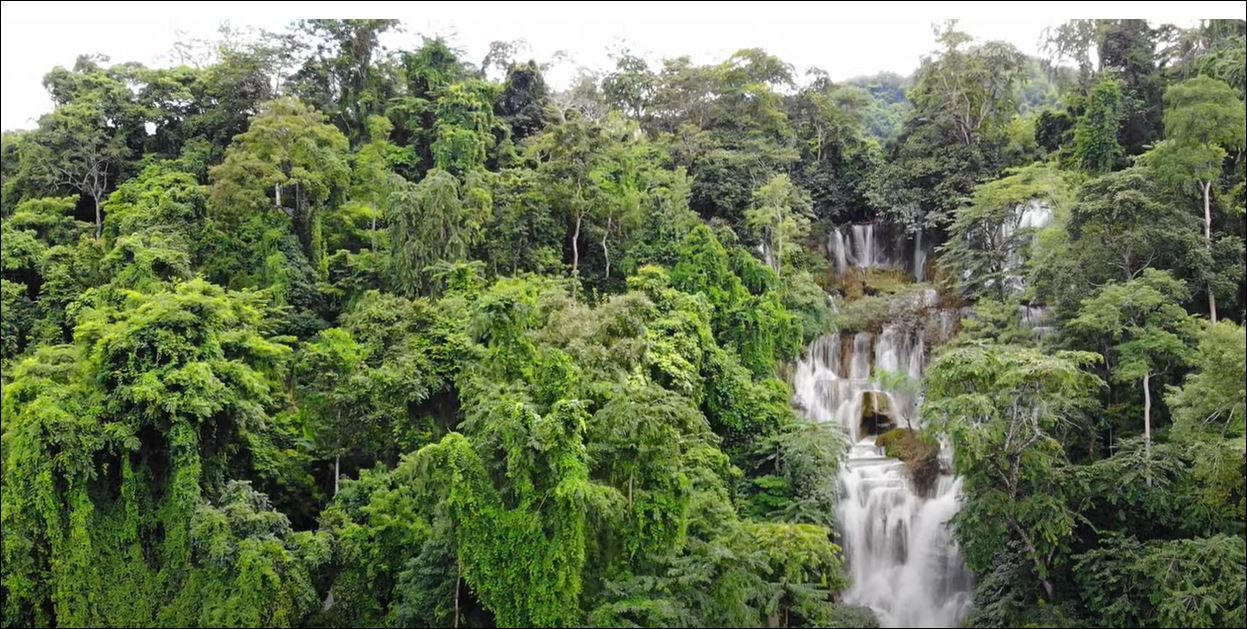
Kuang Si waterfalls in Luang Prabang, Laos

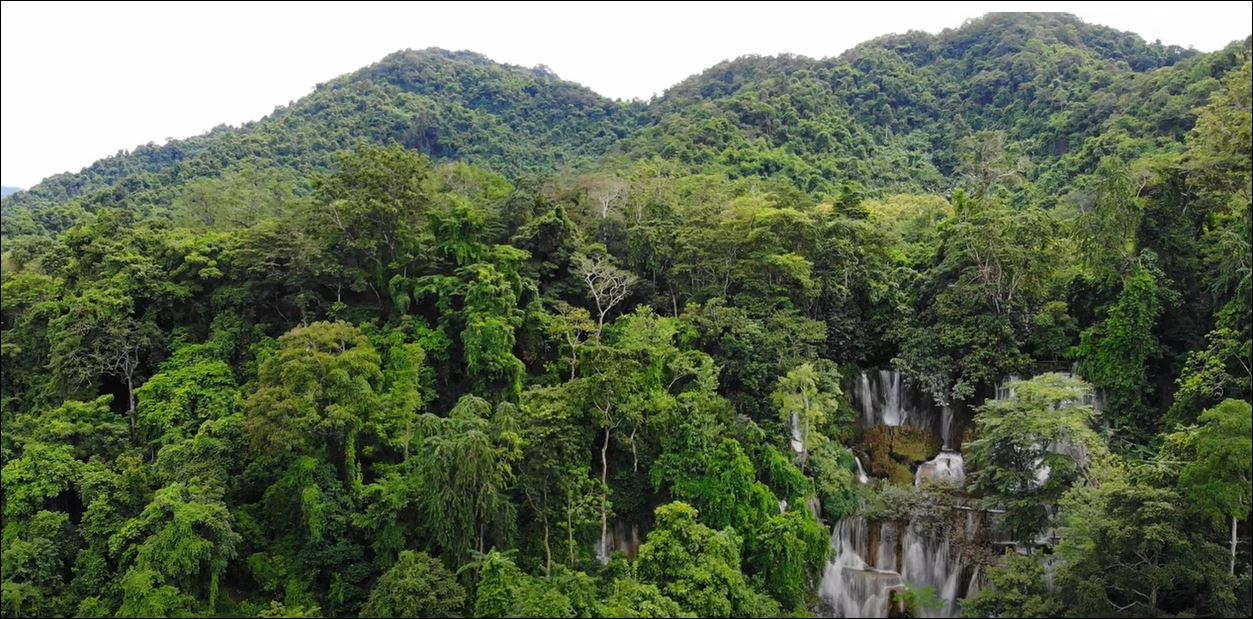
Kuang Si Falls and its landscapes in Luang Prabang province, Laos

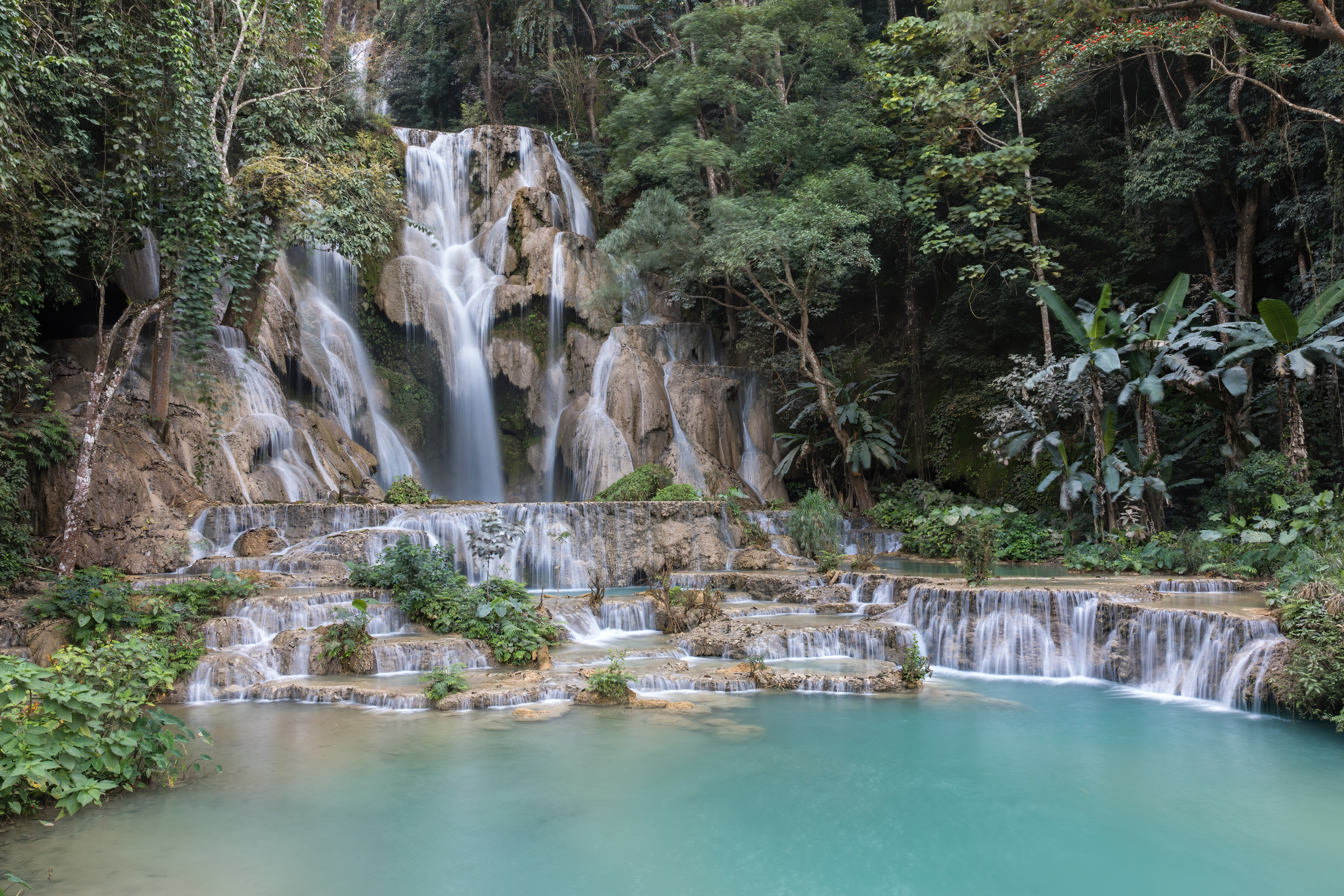
Kuang Si Falls and a turquoise water pool.

The Kuang Si Falls or Kuang Xi Falls (Lao: ນ້ຳຕົກຕາດ ກວາງຊີ), alternatively known as the Tat Kuang Si Waterfalls, is a multi-tiered waterfall in Laos about 29 kilometers (18 mi) south of the town of Luang Prabang. The journey takes 53 minutes from Luang Prabang Night Market downtown. The waterfalls are a favorite side trip for tourists in Luang Prabang, and begin in shallow pools atop a steep hillside. These lead to the main fall with a drop of 60 meters (200 ft).

== History ==
Kuang Si waterfall is located about 29 kilometers south of Luang Prabang city. The river that rises and flows into Tad Kuang Si waterfall is called Nam "Si" or Si River. The distance between its source and Tad Kuang Si waterfall is about 10 kilometers. The height of the waterfall is 60 meters. The water flows and falls in three cascade waterfalls over white limestone rocks into aquamarine turquoise (color) pools surrounded by tropical trees.

The source of Nam SI is located at the foot of the mountains where the Hmong people and Lao Theung, Khmu hill tribes once lived. Their villages were called Ban Nong Thouk, Ban Hin Oih and Ban Nam Ork (Exited). At the bottom of the waterfall is the village called Ban Tad. Due to slash-and-burn rice farming in the mountains and valleys by Hmong and Khmu farmers, the Nam Si River experienced drought. After 1975, the Lao government relocated the hill tribes to other places in the area to restore natural resources. Only a few straw houses still remain around this place for foreign tourists.

== Etymology ==
Nam Tok Tad means 'Waterfall; Nam means Water; Kuang means Deer; Si is the river name; Ban means village

== See also ==
- List of waterfalls
- Ban Phou Pheung Noi
- Muang Soui
- Sam Thong
- Route 7 (Laos)
- Chao Anouvong cave
- Anouvong district
- Hmong New Year
- Luang Prabang Night Market

== Gallery ==
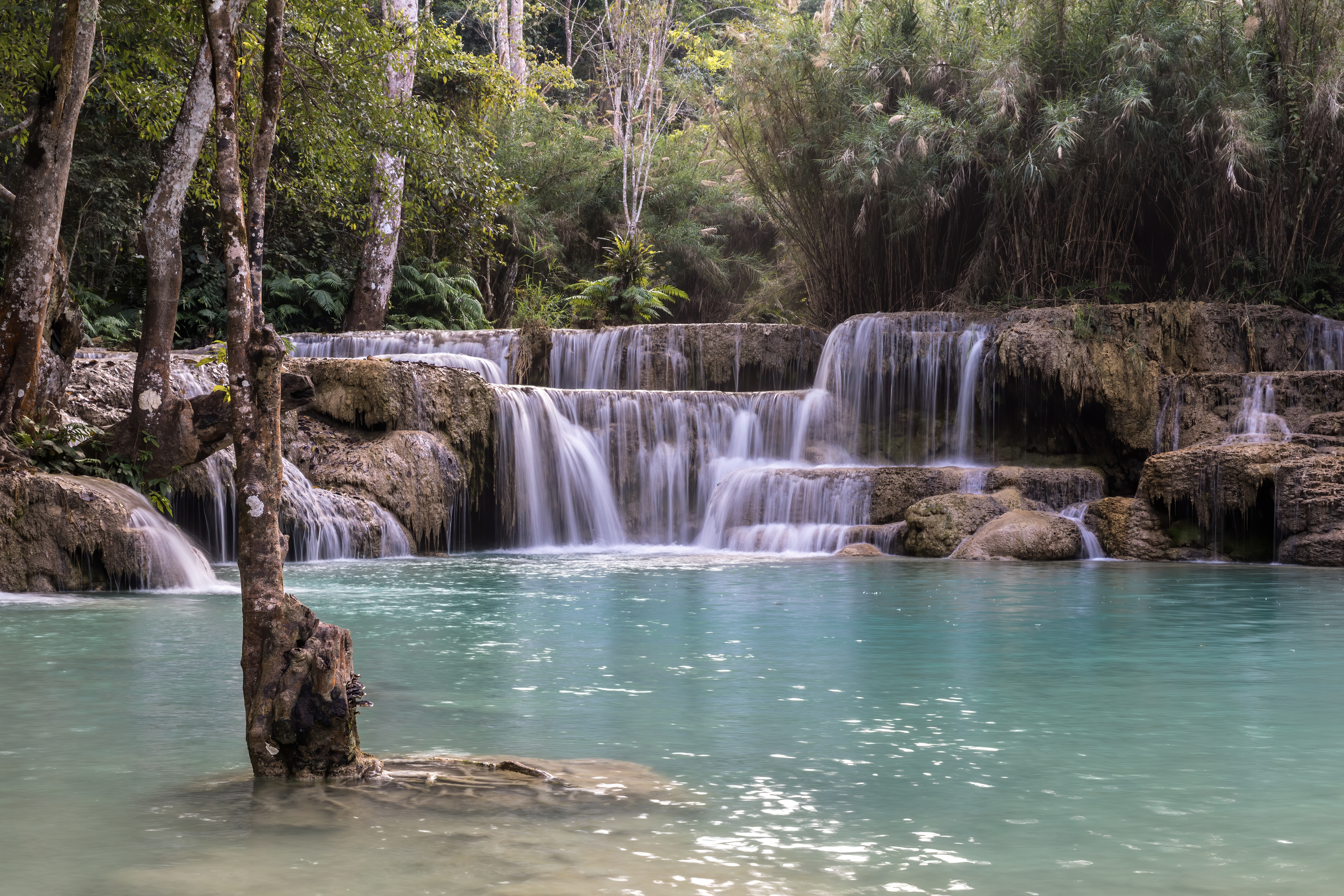
Kuang Si Falls with submerged tree in turquoise water

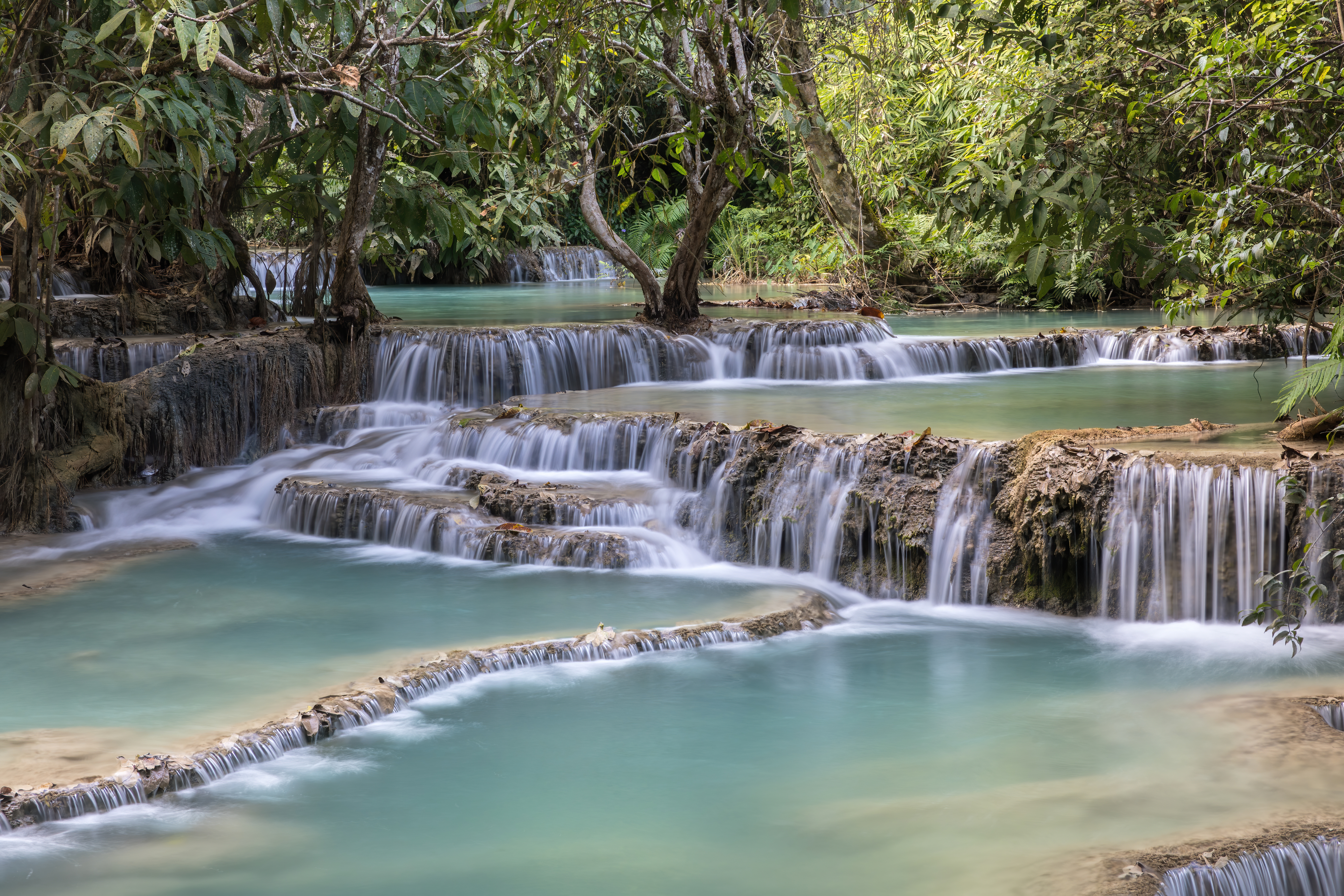
Kuang Si Falls and its emerald water pools

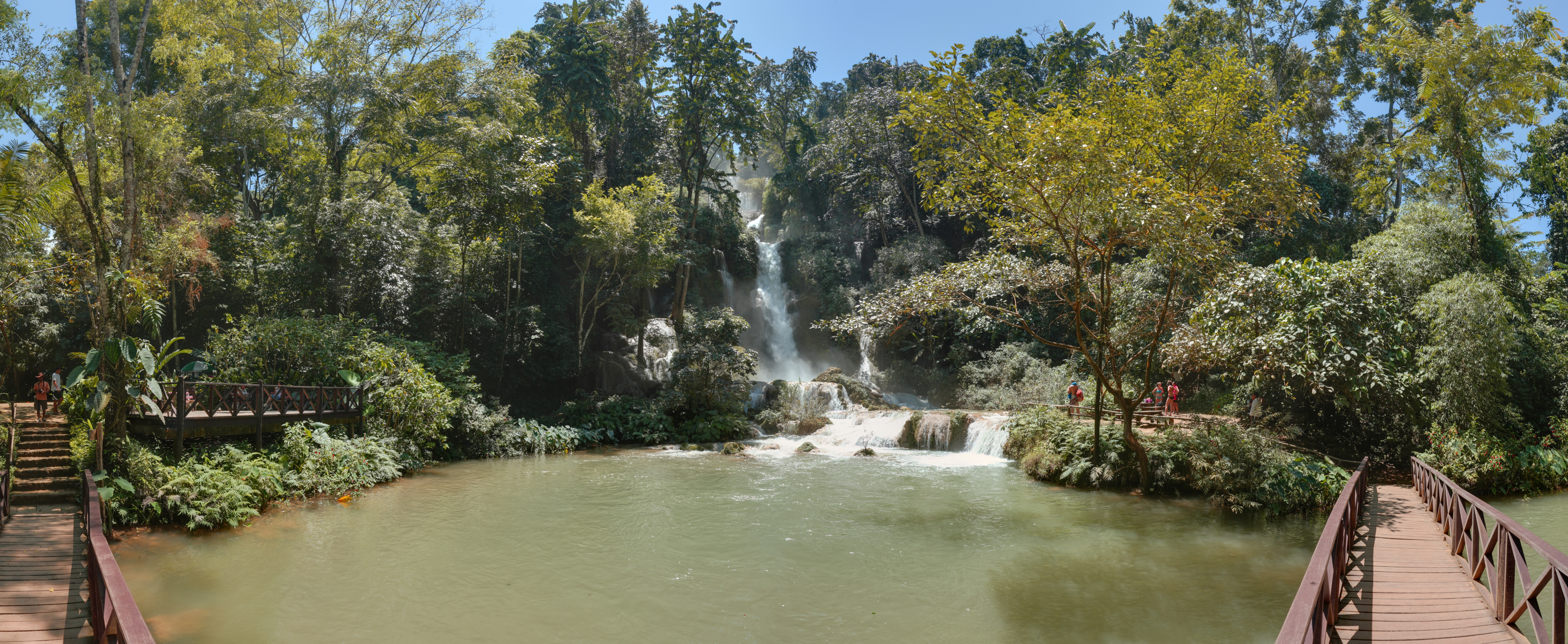
Kuang Si waterfalls, near Luang Prabang
