= Anouvong district =

Anouvong district ອະນຸວົງ
- District
- Location of Anouvong district in Laos
- Coordinates: 18.9057°N 103.092°E
- Country: Laos
- Established: 13 December 2013

Population (2015)
  - Total: 23,700
- Time zone: UTC+7 (ICT)

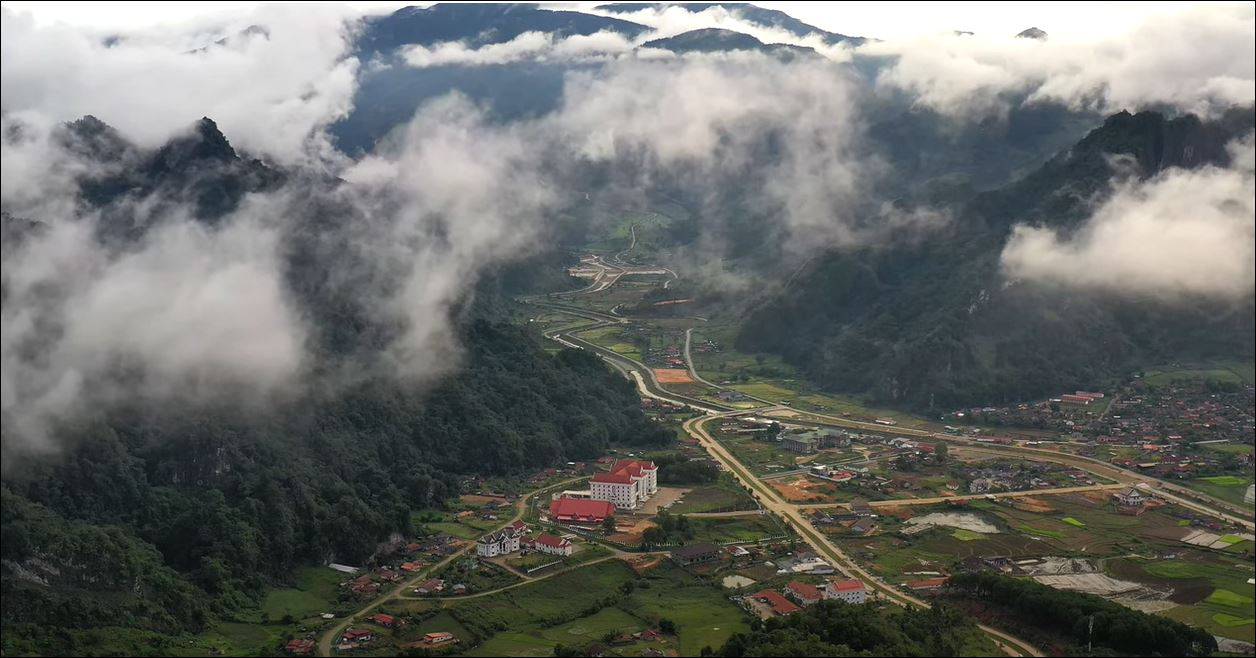
Route to go Tchao Anouvong cave, Phou Houa Xang village, and Phou Bia

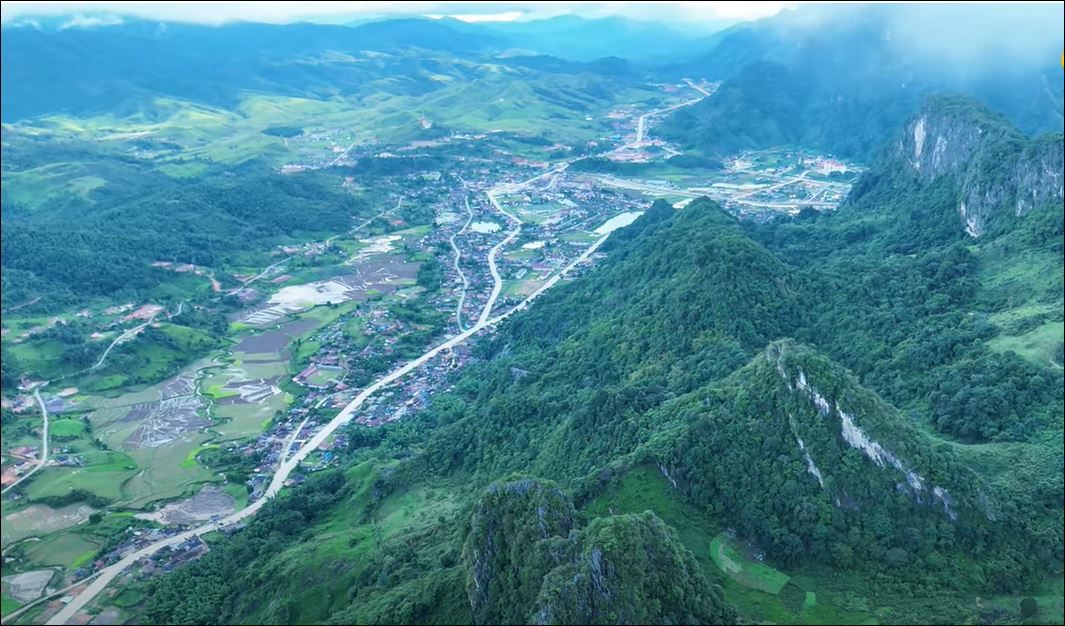
Ban Muang Cha, city of Anouvong district, Xaisomboun province, Laos

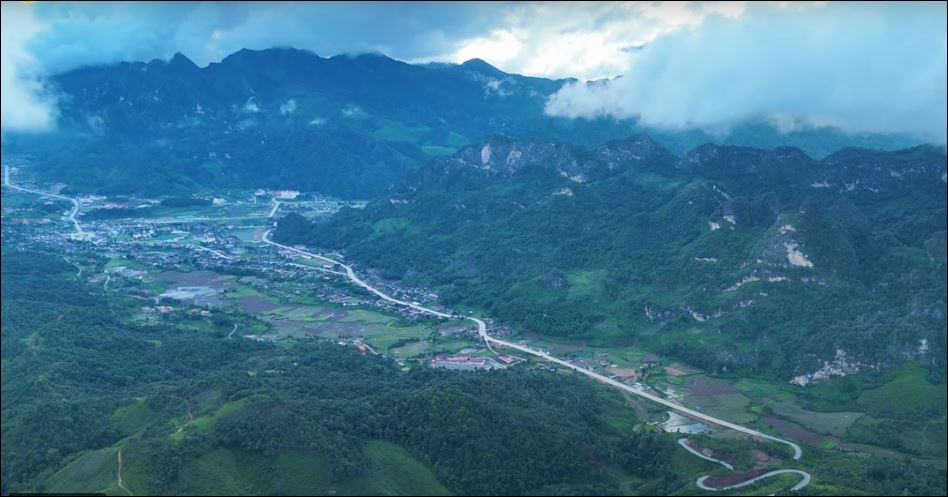
Ban Muong Cha, City of Anouvong district, viewed from the sky, Xaisomboun province, Laos.

Anouvong district is the capital of Xaisomboun Province, located about 230 kilometers north of Vientiane, the capital of Laos. The city of Anouvong district is Ban Muang Cha (pronounced Ja from Ja river). It is home to Chao Anouvong cave, which is part of Phou Houa Xang Village, as well as the Phou Bia peak tourist site.

== History ==
On December 13, 2013, Xaisomboun was proclaimed the 18th province of Laos by the Lao People's Democratic Republic government. From there, the capital is therefore called in the name of King Anouvong. This city currently extends over the region of the village (Ban) of Muang Cha (Ja, Ja river) and other small villages in the surroundings.

In 2021, the authorities of Xaisomboun province approved a budget estimated at USA $500 million for the development of Phou Bia Mountain. This project will take place from Phou Houa Xang village, where Chao Anouvong cave is part of it, to the summit of Phou Bia Mountain. This development aims at tourism activities, especially to attract visitors from all over the world. It is under a 99-year concession.

About Ban Muong Cha or Muong Cha, the city of Anouvong district, it lies at the bottom of the mountains and plateaus of Phou Bia mountain and others that extend from east to west, from Ban Om in the east to the village (Ban) Nam Pha Noi, Ban Pha Khe, and Ban Pha Nokok in the west, on the road to Long Tieng district and Ban Sam Thong, Xaisomboun province, Laos. This village, Ban Muong Cha, has existed since the 1920s. The first inhabitants who came to settle in this small village of Muong Cha (Ja) were Lao, then the Hmong hill tribes (Hmong or Miao_Meo) came later after the 1940s.

During the Vietnam War 1961–1975, there were some new changes in this town. It was mainly the developments, including the construction of Ban Muong Cha airport, a training center for General Vang Pao's military, then the relocation of Sam Thong College from Sokpaluang, Fa Ngum High School, Vientiane capital of Laos, to Muang Cha in 1974. This school, Sam Thong College, was created in 1966 in Sam Thong, Xaisomboun (former Xiengkhouang) province, then moved to Sokpaluang, to Fa Ngum High School in 1970, due to the CIA war. But the school was short-lived in Muang Cha after its relocation from Vientiane capital, then it disappeared immediately in Mai 1975 when the LPDR government came to power in the country. The village airport followed the same way as the Sam Thong high school.

== Geography ==
Geographically, Chao Anouvong district is located in the center of Xaisomboun province. To the north, there are Phou Hua Xang village and Phou Bia mountain. To the south, there are Ban Ao Neua village and Ao Kang. To the east, if you continue to take the road, it goes to Ban Om, then Ban Na Sang afterwards. To the west, there is Ban Hua Lon, then Ban Thong Khon which is further away and goes to Sana Somboun village.

== Climate ==
Climate data for Xaisomboun (1990–2019)
Month	Jan	Feb	Mar	Apr	May	Jun	Jul	Aug	Sep	Oct	Nov	Dec	Year
Mean daily maximum °C (°F)	23.3 (73.9)	25.5 (77.9)	27.1 (80.8)	28.0 (82.4)	27.1 (80.8)	26.3 (79.3)	25.4 (77.7)	25.7 (78.3)	26.2 (79.2)	25.9 (78.6)	25.3 (77.5)	23.4 (74.1)	25.8 (78.4)
Daily mean °C (°F)	15.8 (60.4)	17.8 (64.0)	20.2 (68.4)	22.1 (71.8)	22.6 (72.7)	22.7 (72.9)	22.2 (72.0)	22.2 (72.0)	22.0 (71.6)	20.9 (69.6)	19.0 (66.2)	16.6 (61.9)	20.3 (68.6)
Mean daily minimum °C (°F)	8.2 (46.8)	10.0 (50.0)	13.2 (55.8)	16.2 (61.2)	18.1 (64.6)	19.1 (66.4)	18.9 (66.0)	18.6 (65.5)	17.8 (64.0)	15.9 (60.6)	12.7 (54.9)	9.7 (49.5)	14.9 (58.8)
Average precipitation mm (inches)	37 (1.5)	13 (0.5)	56 (2.2)	158 (6.2)	257 (10.1)	433 (17.0)	611 (24.1)	508 (20.0)	255 (10.0)	132 (5.2)	46 (1.8)	22 (0.9)	2,528 (99.5)
Average relative humidity (%)	65.0	63.0	65.0	65.4	74.0	79.7	81.7	84.0	78.0	71.6	66.1	62.7	71.4
Source 1: Food and Agriculture Organization of the United Nations
Source 2: SeaDelt (humidity 2016–2022)

== Demographics ==
According to a census conducted in July 2015, Anouvong district has approximatively 25,733 inhabitants. As on July 1, 2020, at the same time, it has 29,733 inhabitants and an area of 2,068 km2. Based on the evolution of the population of Anouvong as well as related information and services (Wikipedia, Google, images), there is a population increase of 2.8%.

== See also ==
- Ban Phou Pheung Noi
- Muang Soui
- Sam Thong
- Chao Anouvong cave
- Route 7 (Laos)
- Hmong New Year
- Kuang Si Falls
- Luang Prabang Night Market
