= Chao Anouvong cave =

Cave in Laos

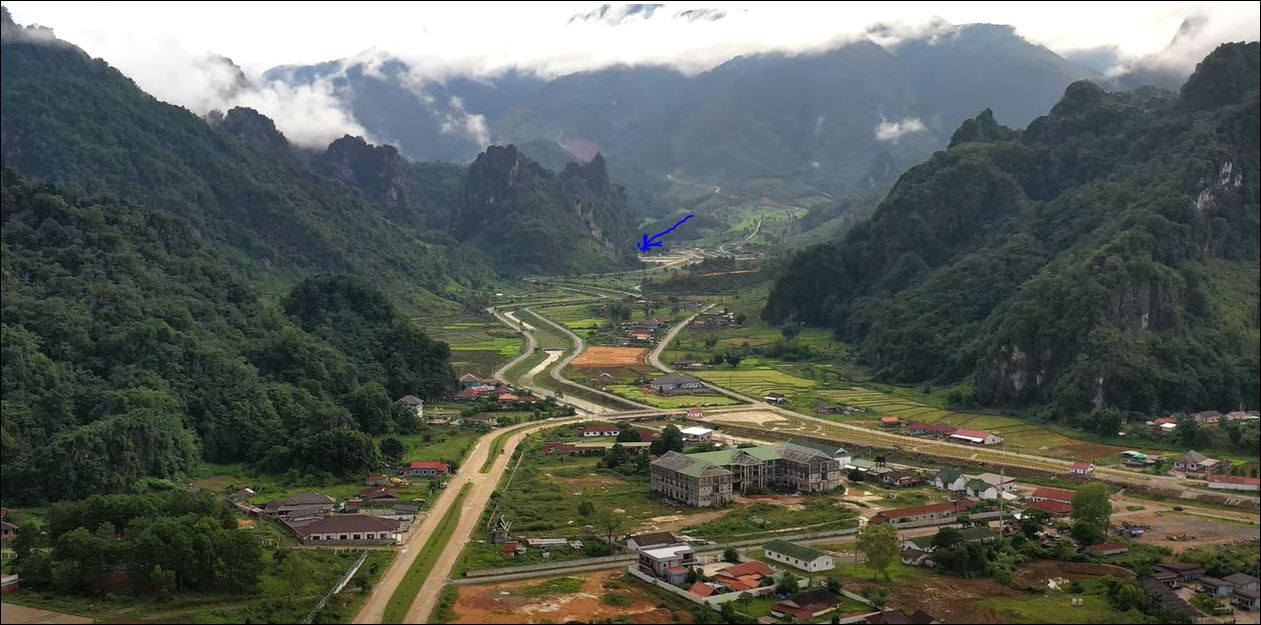
Tchao Anouvong Cave Map location

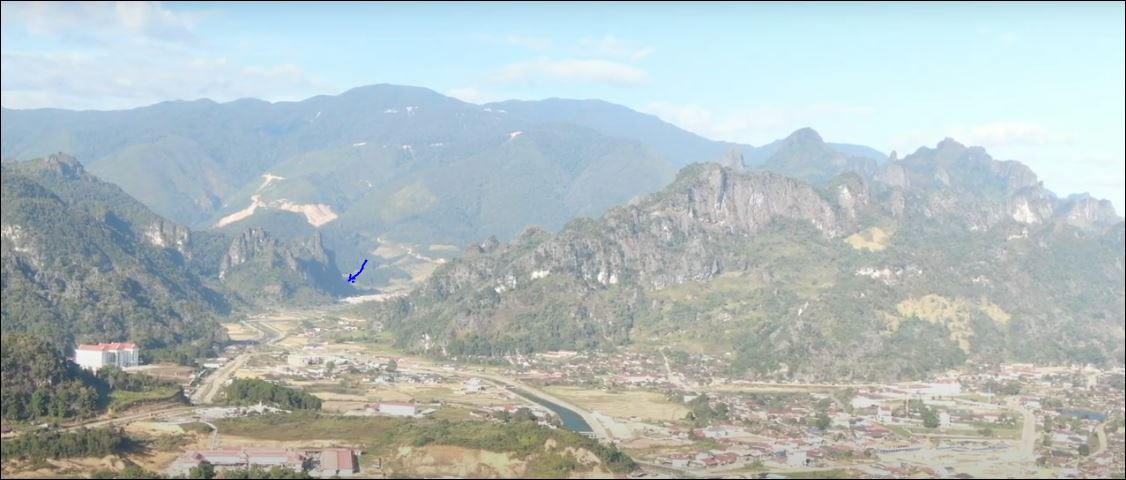
Location of Tchao Anouvong Cave

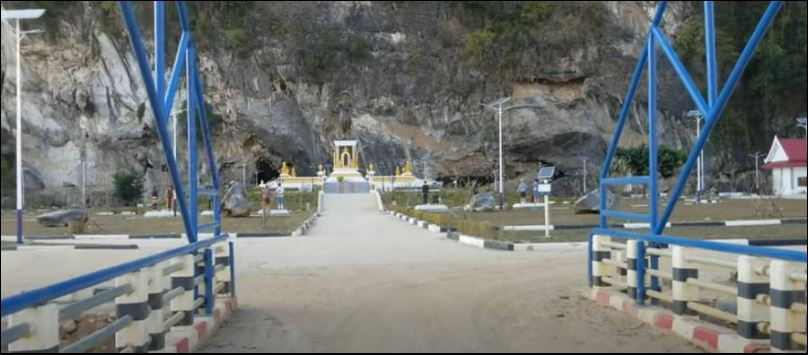
TChao Anouvong Cave in Xaisomboun province, Laos.

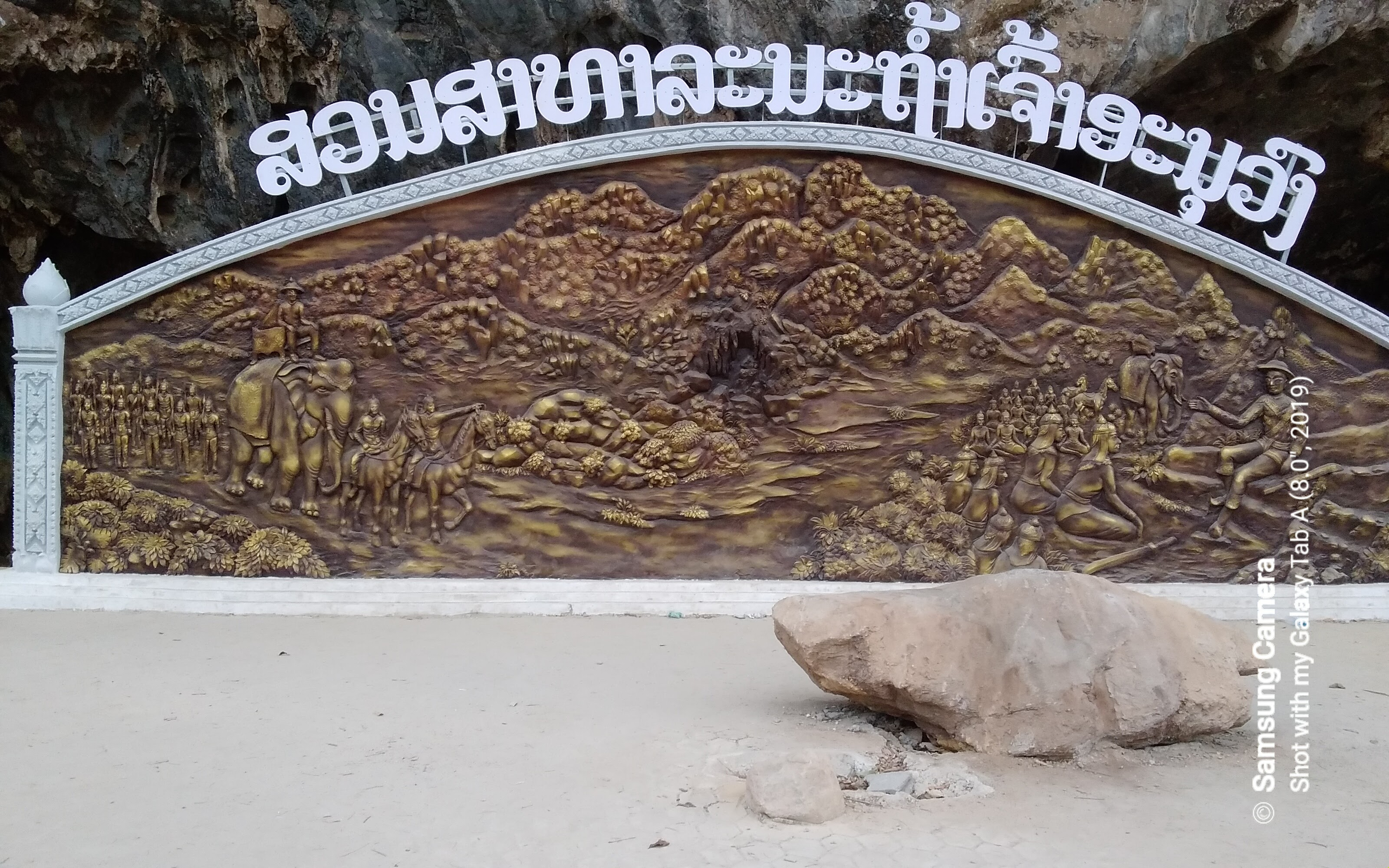
Tchao Anouvong Cave (ຖ້ຳ ເຈົ້າ ອານຸວົງ) in Xaisomboun (Muong cha), Laos

Chao Anouvong cave (ຖ້ຳ ເຈົ້າ ອານຸວົງ) is a large cave in Laos. It is located about 3 km (2 miles) from Anouvong district, Xaisomboun province. The cave sits on the bank of Nam Ja (Ja River), on Route 5. It lies at the foot of a rocky cliff. Nearby Phou Bia Mountain is 2,819 m (9,249 ft) high.

At the entrance the cave is about 15 meters wide and 4 meters high. The footpath inside gradually shrinks as it continues. The cave is about 100 meters long, and offers two exits on the other side of the cliff.

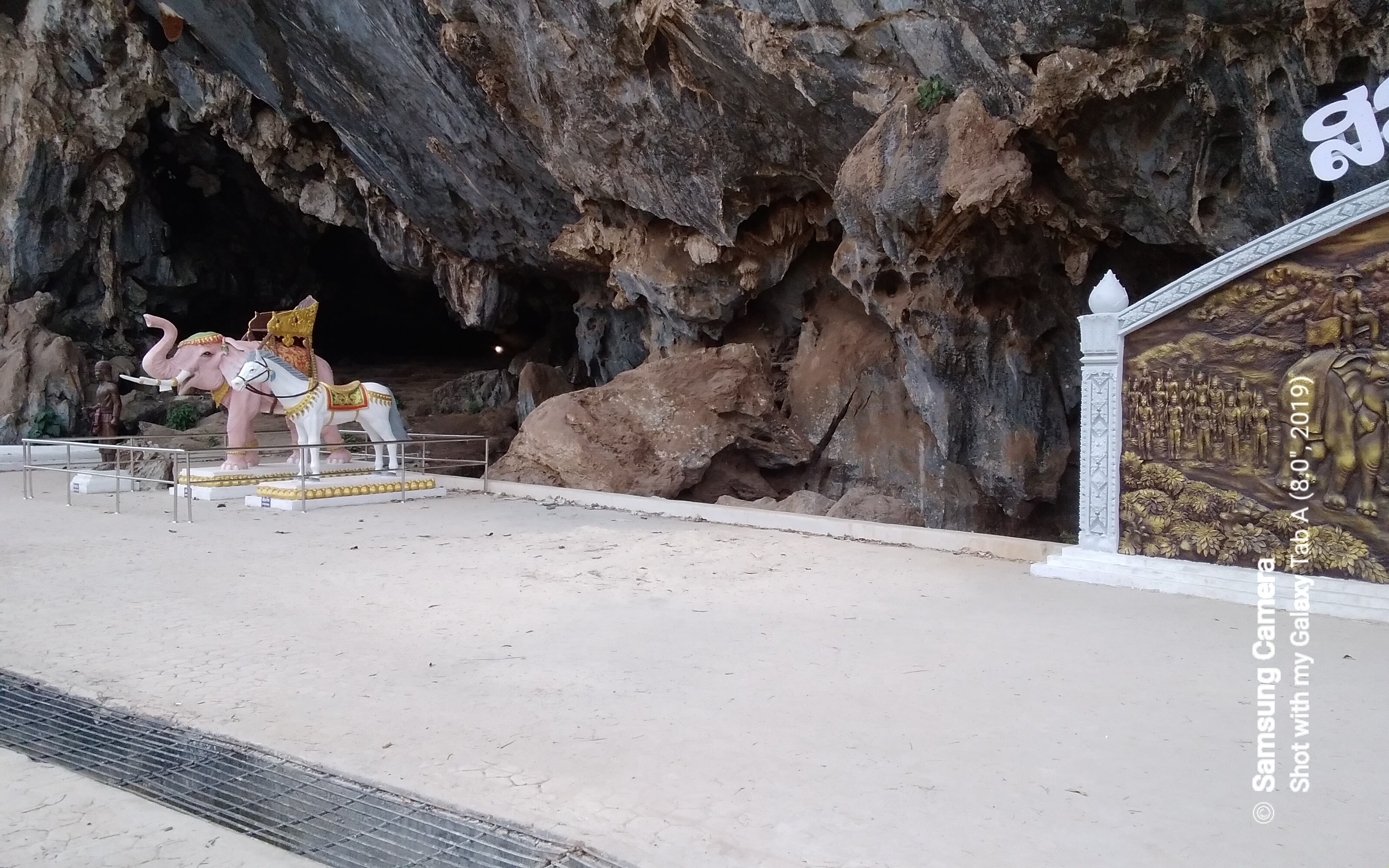
Entrance Tchao Anouvong Cave (ຖ້ຳ ເຈົ້າ ອານຸວົງ) in Xaisomboun province, Laos

== History ==
Its name comes from Prince Anou, Anu, known as Chao Anou or Chao Anouvong. The prince was born in 1767 in Vientiane and died in 1828 in Thailand, killed by the Royal Thai Army. He fought the Siamese from 1826 - 1828 as part of the rebellion for the independence of the kingdom of Vientiane and kingdom of Champasak.

The cave was discovered and after the Siamese occupied the kingdom of Vientiane and Champasak. The public learned of it only after the Siamese completed their conquest. Anouvong hid in one of the caves. From then on, this cave was called Chao Anouvong cave.

== Etymology ==
Tchao means prince Nam means river.

== See also ==
- Ban Phou Pheung Noi
- Muang Soui
- Sam Thong
- Route 7 (Laos)
- Hmong New Year
- Anouvong district
- Kuang Si Falls
