= Luang Prabang Night Market =

Market in Laos

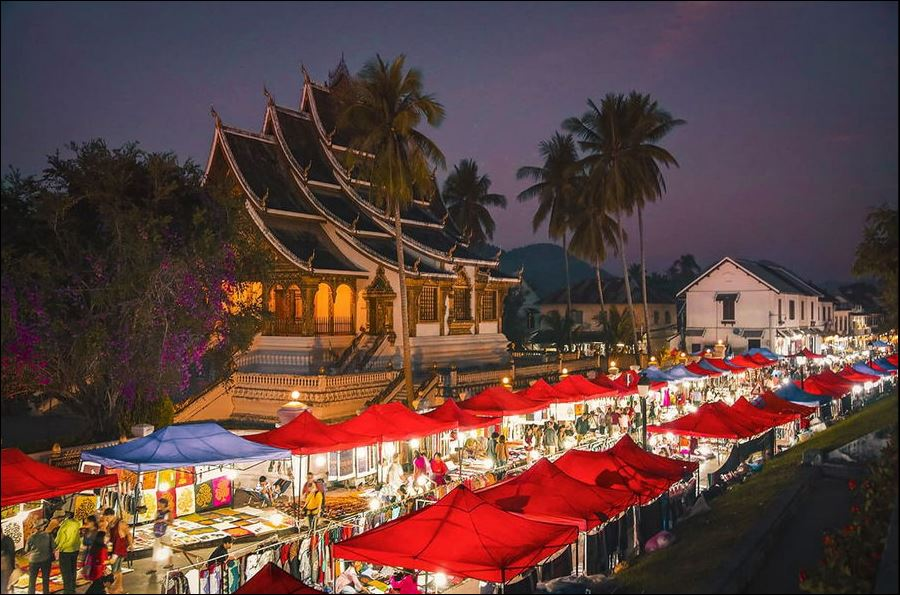
Night Market of Luang Prabang in Laos

The Luang Prabang Night Market is an open-air flea Night Market located in downtown of Luang Prabang, Luang Prabang Province, Laos. It is open daily from 5:00 pm – 11:00 pm local time on Sisavangvong Road and end at the intersections of Chao Fa Ngum and Kingkitsarat Roads. Adjacent to the night market is the Royal Palace and the Haw Kham Buddhist Temple. Both are listed as World Heritage Sites by the United Nations Educational, Scientific and Cultural Organization (UNESCO) and are open daily to tourist attractions and visitors from morning to afternoon.

== History ==
Luang Prabang Night Market has been open along Sisavangvong Road to Kingkitsarat Road since late 1996. The market was originally intended to last only a few weeks. It was only set up as part of Western Christmas festivities. Meanwhile, Hmong craftsmen and other local ethnic groups came to sell their wares+ to tourists and foreign passers-by. At that time, the streets were poorly lit. There was no power supply yet.

Gradually, day and night, the Hmong, Khmu and Lao people of Luang Prabang flock to the open-air night market in the evening to sell their wares such as handicrafts, textile, Hmong embroidery, jewelry, arts, food, fish products, etc. Some bazaars are larger and busier than others, such as Luang Prabang Night Market. The latter is a privileged place of tourist attractions with the traditional crafts of the country. Merchants from all over the Luang Prabang region come to present the products of their know-how. On site, visitors can choose from a multitude of shops to find an authentic souvenir of a trip to Laos.

Over time, the night market has grown and expanded due to the increase in tourists who have come from all over the world to visit the UNESCO Word Heritage Site in Luang Prabang city, Luang Prabang province, Laos. Since then, not only the Hmong, but there are also the Lao, Khmu, and others who come to sell their know-how. The market has become a place where visitors like to come with their families to shop and eat. There are not only clothes, jewelry, or art objects, there are also fast food restaurants on site and also other kinds of Laotian, Thai, Chinese cuisine on the night market square or Luang Prabang Night Market.

== Gallery ==
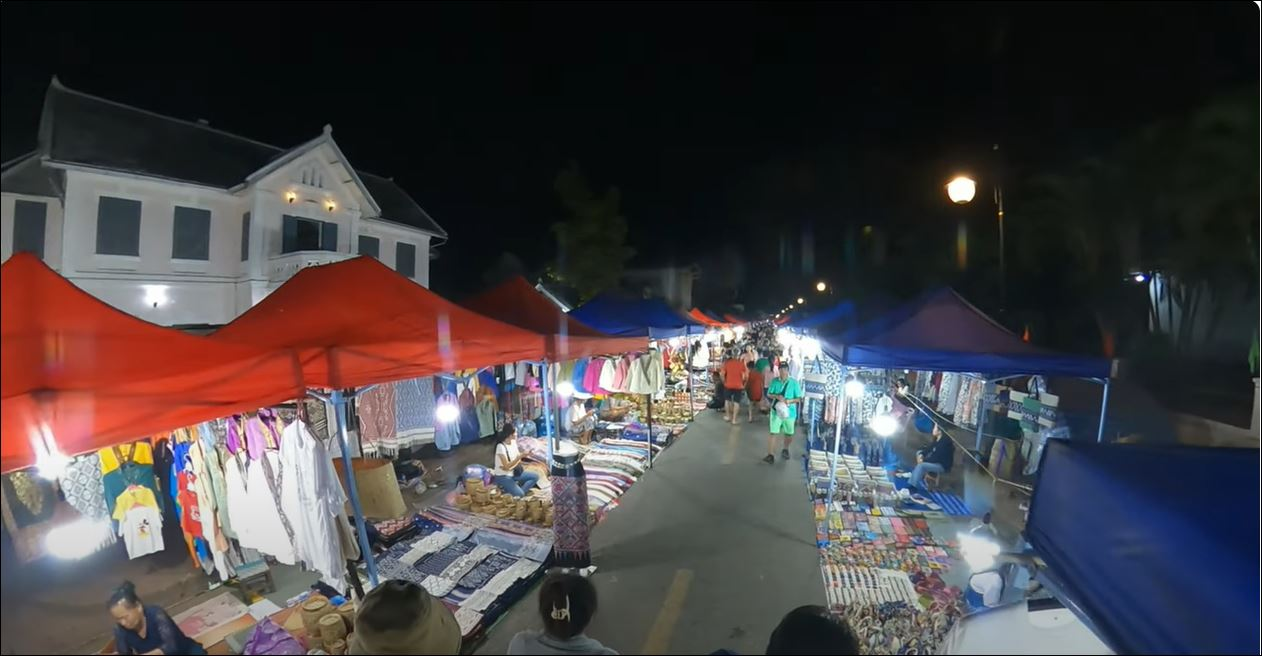
Luang Prabang Flea Night Market in Luang Prabang, Laos

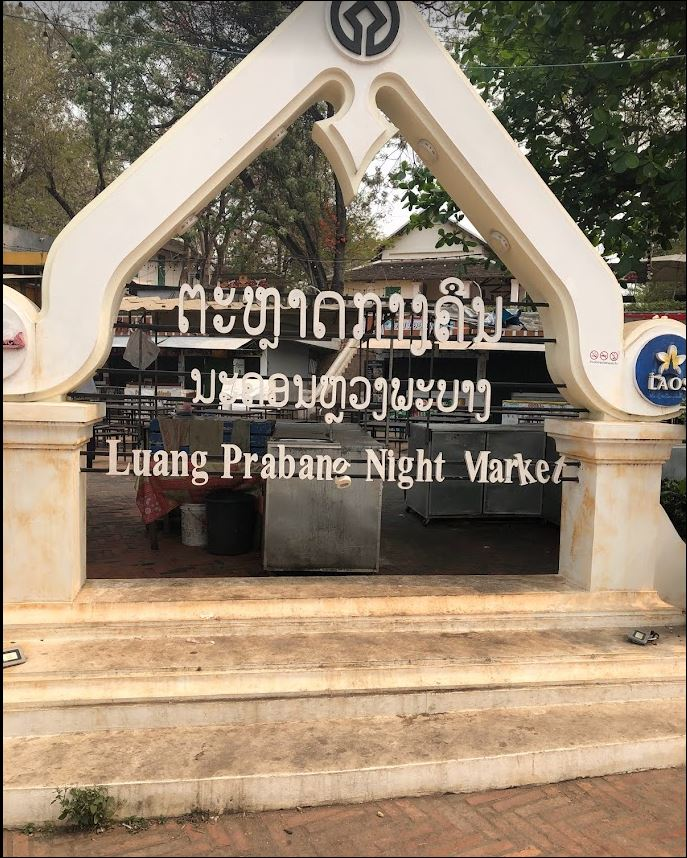
Luang Prabang Night Market, Luang Prabang province, Laos

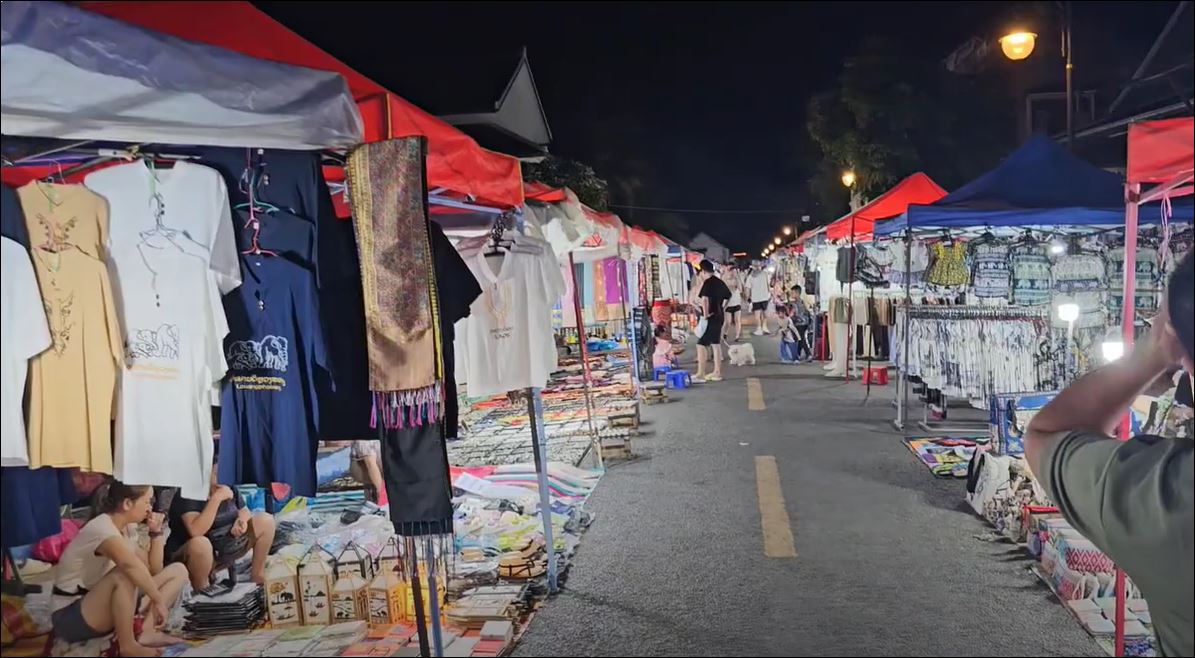
Hmong Cloth Products in Night Market of Luang Prabang

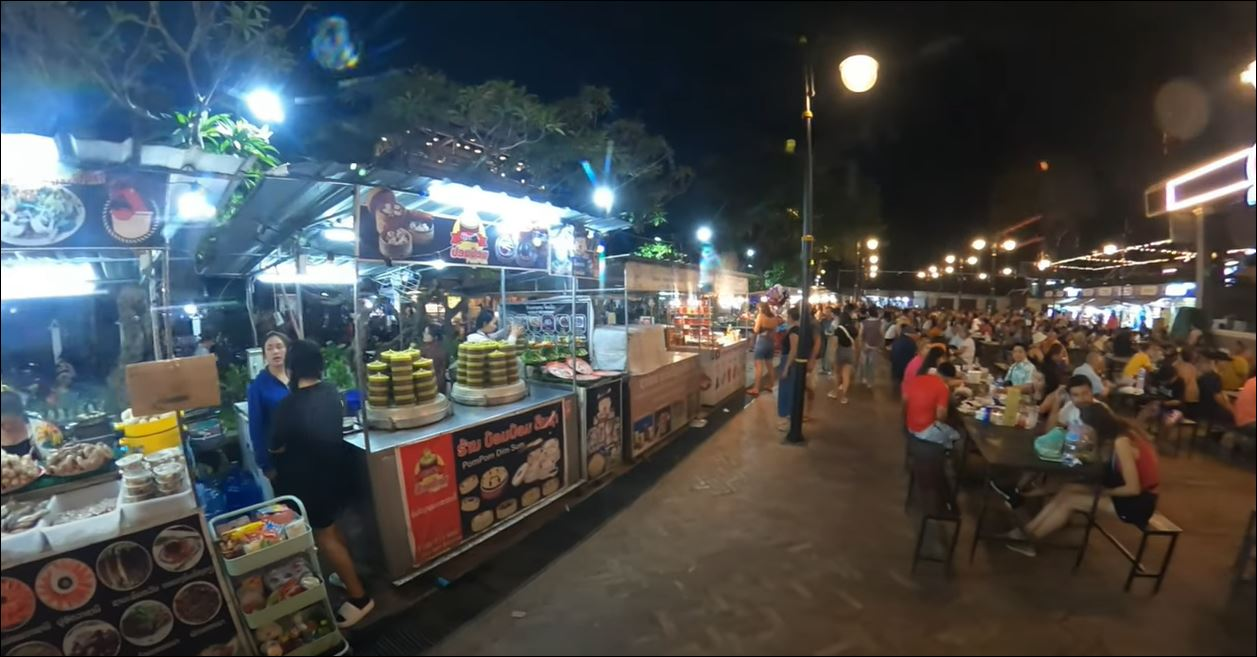
Luang Prabang Night Market and Fast-Food Restaurants

== See also ==
- Ban Phou Pheung Noi
- Muang Soui
- Sam Thong
- Route 7 (Laos)
- Anouvong district
- Hmong New Year
