= Ban Phou Pheung Noi =

Historic place in Laos

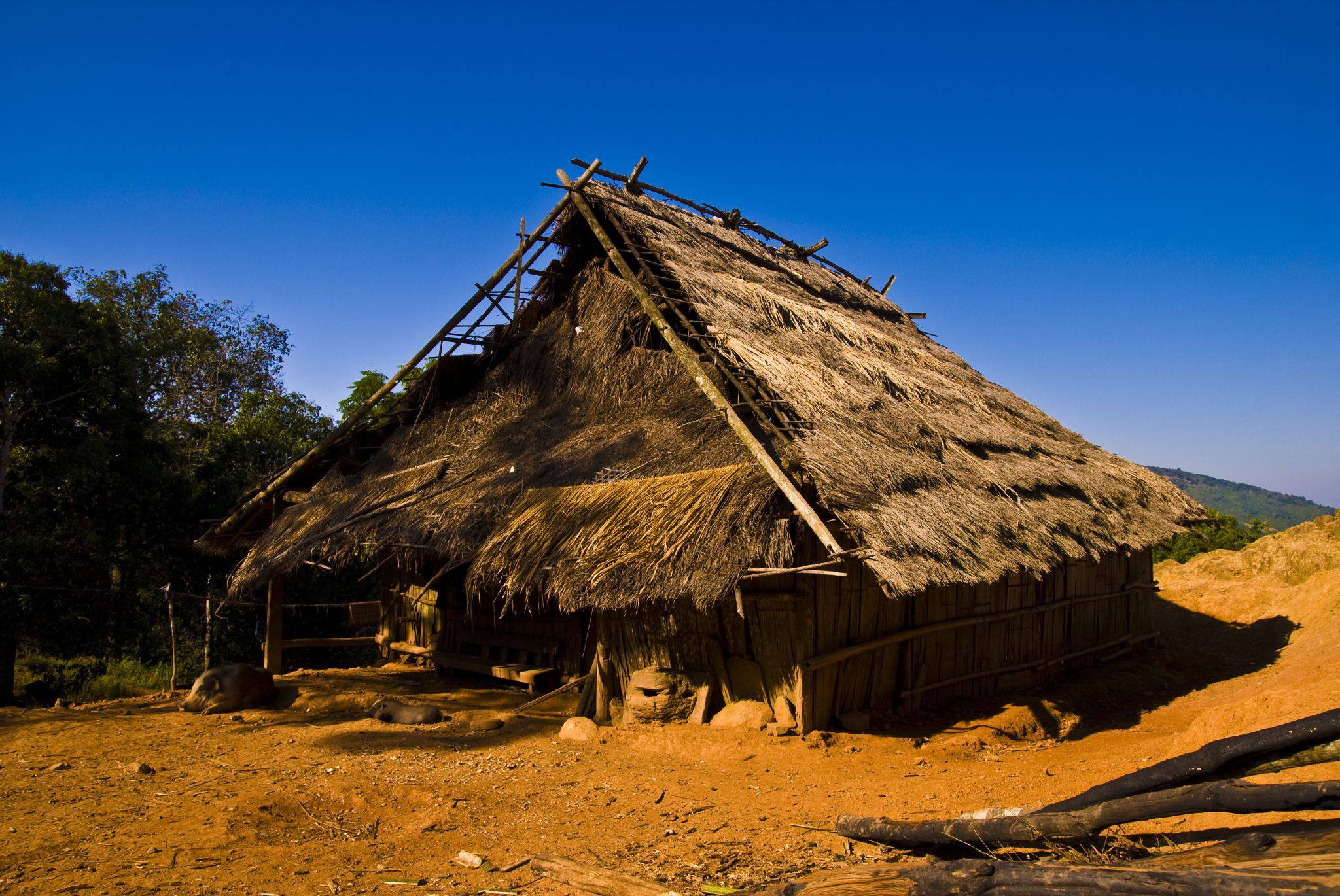
- Hmong bamboo house at Ban Phou Pheung Noi
- Interactive map of Ban Phou Pheung Noi
- Coordinates: 19°27′6″N 102°59′36″E
- Country: Laos
- Province: Xieng Khouang province
- founded: 1945; 81 years ago - ended 1969
- Elevation: 916 m (3,005 ft)

Population
  - Total: 310

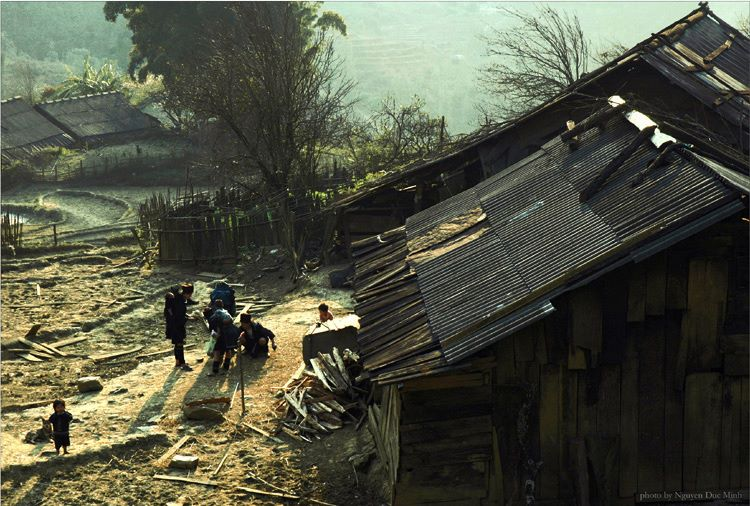
Hmong wooden house at Ban Phou Pheung Noi

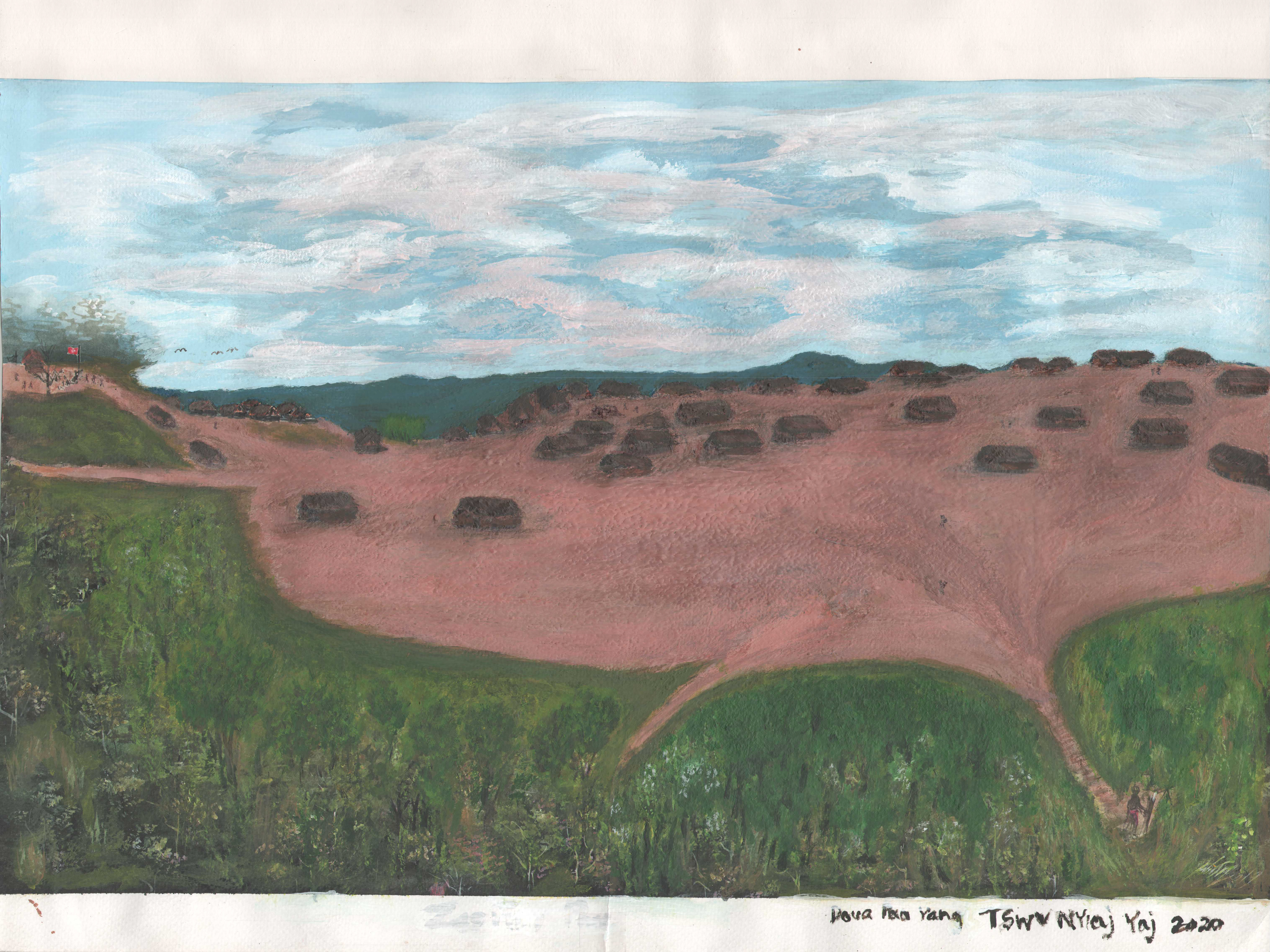
Ban Phou Pheung Noi - 1950 - 1970

Ban Phou Pheung Noi (Lao: ບ້ານພູເຟືອງນ້ອຍ) is a Laotian village located at the peak of Phou Pheung mountain in the Xieng Khouang province of Laos. Phou Pheung mountain is approximately 916 m (3,005 ft). During the Vietnam War, combat between the American allies, the Hmong, the Pathet Lao, and the Communist North Vietnamese People's Army took place on the mountain. Phou Pheung mountain runs from east to west, and it is rocky and covered in tropical forests. It is south of Muang Soui - Nongtang-Nato, and west of Phou Douk, Muang Phuan, Phonsavan and Plain of Jars. To the east, about 10 miles from Ban Phou Pheung Noi, is the Num Ngum 4 hydroelectric dam.

Down from the village of Ban Phou Pheung Noi are rocky mountains and the Nam Ngum River, which ran west to the Mekong River in Vientiane province. During the rainy season, navigation between Ban Phou Pheung Noi and its neighbors across the river is almost impossible due to rocky cliffs on both banks of the river. To reach the other side of the river, it is necessary to go miles on foot, which could only be attempted during the dry season.

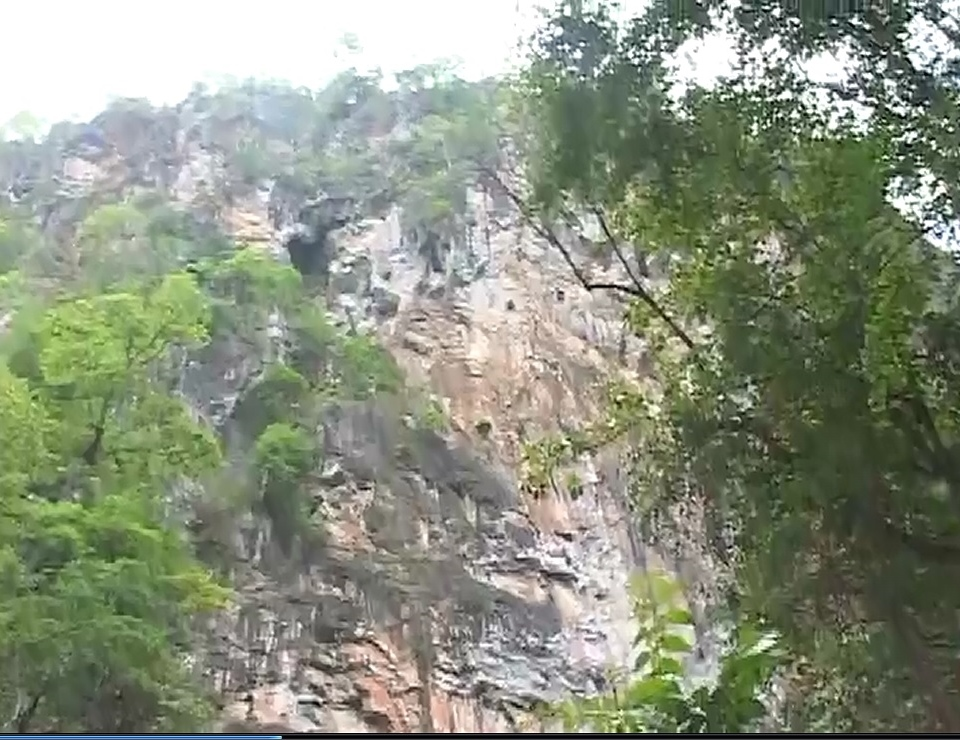
Mountain cliffs

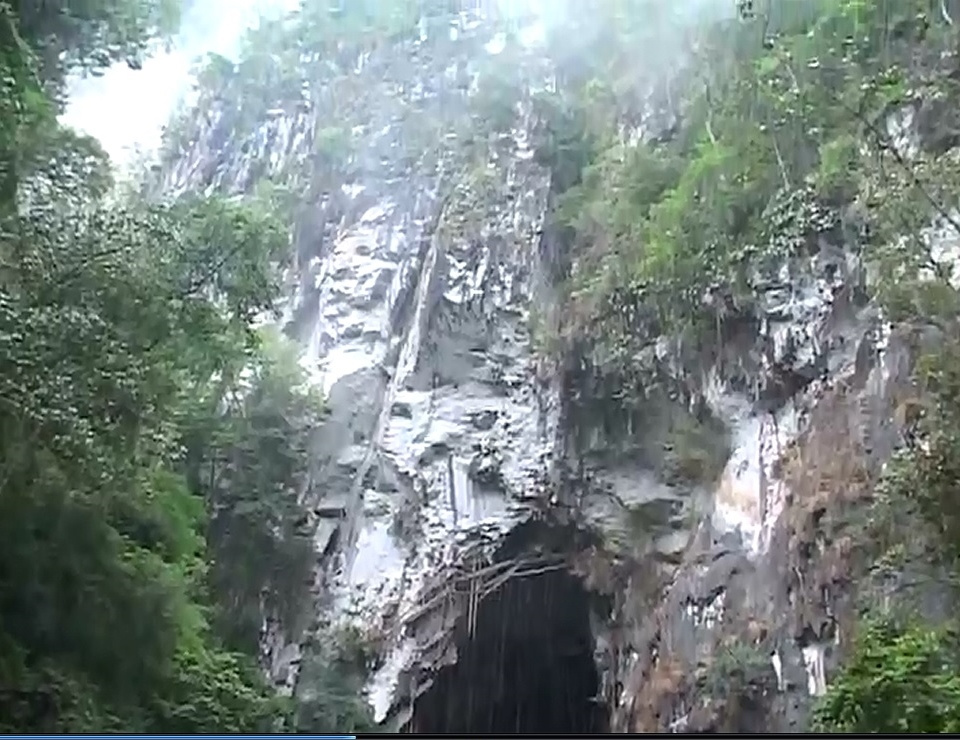
Plateau cliffs

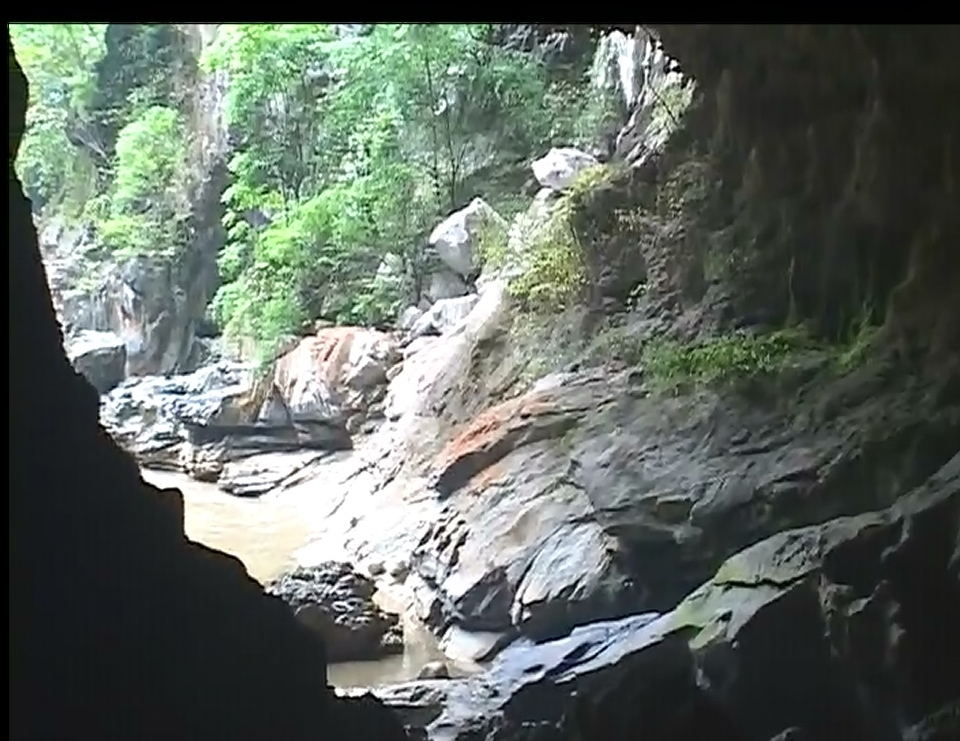
A cave on the cliffs of the Nam Ngum River. During the occupation of Muang Soui by Kong Le troops, the people of Ban Phou Pheung Noi village hid here for several days.

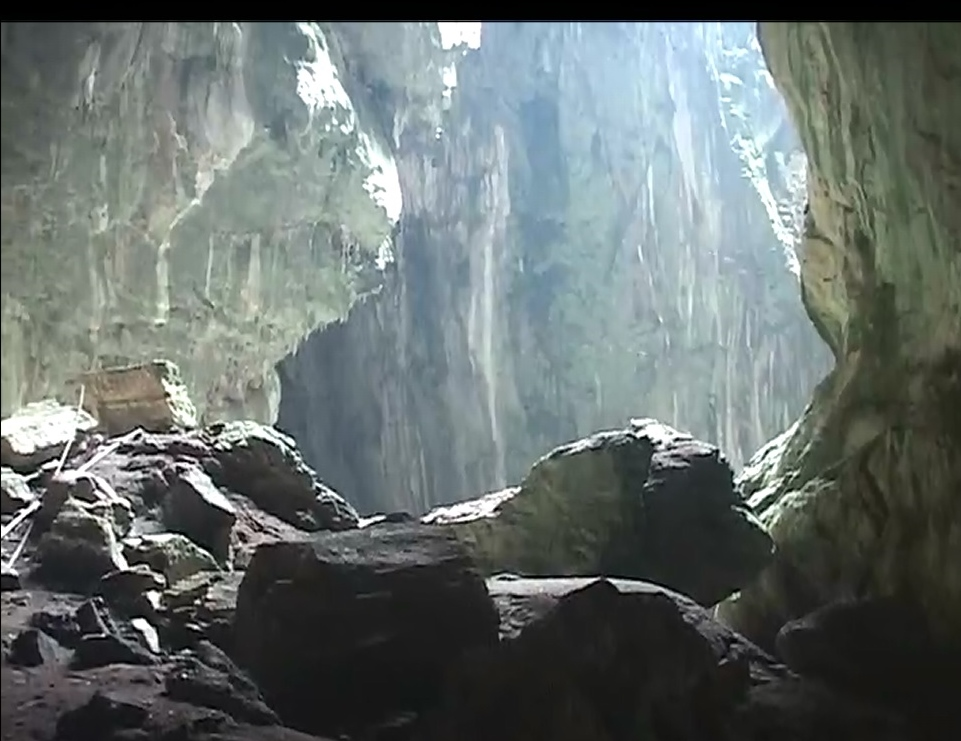
A cave on the cliffs of the Nam Ngum River beneath Phou Pheung Noi Mountain.

== Etymology ==
Phou means "mount", pheung is "peak", and noi means small. Ban means "village".

== History ==
Ban Phou Pheung Noi became known in the 1950s. From 1945 to 1970, two hill tribes lived at the top of the mountain. The first group of inhabitants were Khmu people Lao Theung, an indigenous group from Laos. The others were Hmong people (previously called Miao people), who migrated from South China and North Vietnam in the 18th century. Between 1952 and 1965, the Hmong hill tribes mainly lived in Ban Phou Pheung Noi, hunting, fishing, and burning the rainforest to clear land. They grew corn, rice, and opium poppies. The site of Ban Phou Pheung Noi was covered by dense forest.

When Captain Kong Le overthrew the Royal Lao Government on August 10, 1960 in a coup d'état, Ban Phou Pheung Noi villagers took refuge in a cave on a cliff of Phou pheung mountain on the bank of the Nam Ngum River out of fear of being killed by Kong Le's military troops moving east through Muang Soui to Phonsavan and Plain of Jars. This was how the war began in Laos.

The first American helicopter of the Vietnam War landed in Ban Phou Pheung Noi in 1961. When the hill tribes of the village saw the pilot and the co-pilot sitting with dark glasses in the helicopter, they believed they were Martians (Nyav-noj-neeg in Hmong). They also believed that the flying machine was a metal dragonfly. A few months later, the Vietnam War began and poisoned northern Xieng Khouang province. About three miles away, Lee Lue, a T-28 pilot employed by General Vang Pao and the US CIA, was killed. His T-28 aircraft was hit by a surface-to-air missile while he was conducting combat raids in Muang Soui. on July 12, 1969. He had been born a few miles from where he was killed.

The Vietnam War poisoned the entire north of Laos such as Battles of Nakhang, Samneua, Battle of Lima Site 85, Houaphanh Province, Viengxay Caves areas, and Plain of Jars, Xiangkhouang province. In the Vietnam War, the Laotian Civil War and the US Operation Off-Balance under General Vang Pao, North American T-28 Trojan and US Air Force fighters dropped thousands of bombs on this village. At the beginning of July 1969 American bombs destroyed this village. The villagers fled and eventually scattered around the world. The Hmong tribes abandoned the village in 1969, then hid. Some of the Yang families fled to Thailand, then immigrated to Western countries like Australia, Canada, France and the United States, for the most part after 1975. Most of these refugees settled in Minnesota, California, and also North Carolina.

== Geography ==
The village of Ban Phou Pheung Noi is located between Sam Thong, Long Tieng, to the southeast, Muang Soui to the north, Plain of Jars and Phonsavan to the east, and the royal capital Luang Prabang to the west and north.

The nearest neighboring villages are about three and five miles away. The three villages are called San Luang (LS-41), Houei Ki Nin (LS-38), and Ban Pak Ha (LS-40) respectively. Ban Phou Pheung Noi is east of San Luang, and west of Houei Ki Nin. In administrative affairs, Ban Phou Pheung Noi depended on San Luang district, so Ban Phou Pheung Noi villagers received USAID food in 1969 through San Luang.

== Climate ==
Laos is located on the equator, in the middle of Xieng Khouang province. Hence, the climate is tropical, often very hot and humid. There are two seasons in Ban Phou Pheung Noi: dry and rainy. The temperature is often high, between 20 and 32 Celsius, except during the dry season from November to February.

== Demographics ==
In the early 1960s, Ban Phou Pheung Noi was a small village of 62 families with around 310 inhabitants. This census also included the Khmu population, the first natives, who arrived before the Hmong groups in Ban Phou Pheung Noi. The majority of the inhabitants were Hmong/Miao families, descendants of ChongBlia Yang. The others were from the Hmong Vang and Thao clans. These included three Vang families and two Thao families. Aside from the 47 Yang families, more than ten Khmu or Lao Theung families were not included with the Hmong families.

=== Miao/Hmong ===
The Miao/Hmong are from China, and about 70 different Miao/Hmong groups still live there. Most of these groups have very different customs and languages. They speak different languages; different groups don't intermarry and have different histories and ways of viewing themselves, changed over thousands of years. By ethnicity, there are the Hmong Be, Hmong Bua, Hmong Daw, Hmong Dle Nchab, Hmong Do, Hmong Don, Hmong Dou, Hmong Leng, Hmong Njua, Hmong Shua (sinized), Hmu, and some other Miao groups such as: Miao Bashi, Miao Chansu, Miao Chuan, Miao Enshi, Miao Guiyang Northern, Miao Guiyang Southern, Miao Guiyang Northwestern, Miao Guiyang Southwestern, Miao Guiyang South Central, Miao Horned, Miao Hua, Miao Huashi Central, Miao Huashi Eastern, Miao Huashi Northern, Miao Huashi Southwestern, Miao Lipanshui, Miao Luobohe, Miao Marshan Central, Miao Marshan Northern, Miao Marshan Southern and Miao Marshan Western.

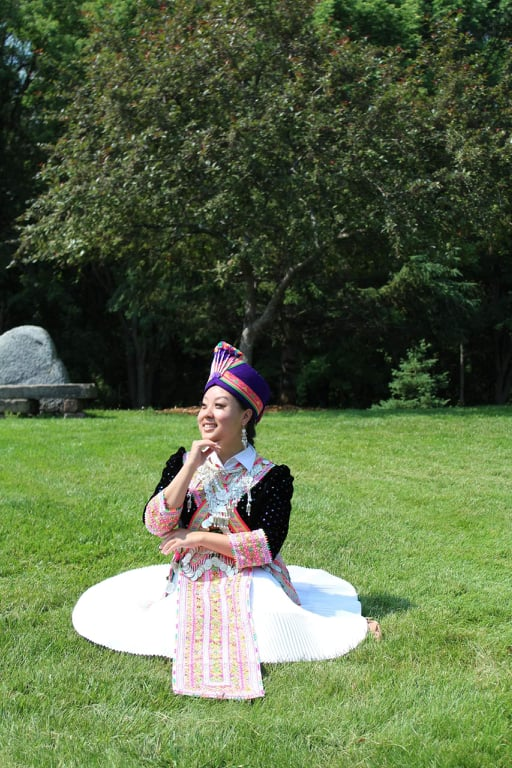
White Hmong woman - Wearing a white skirt from the white Hmong group.

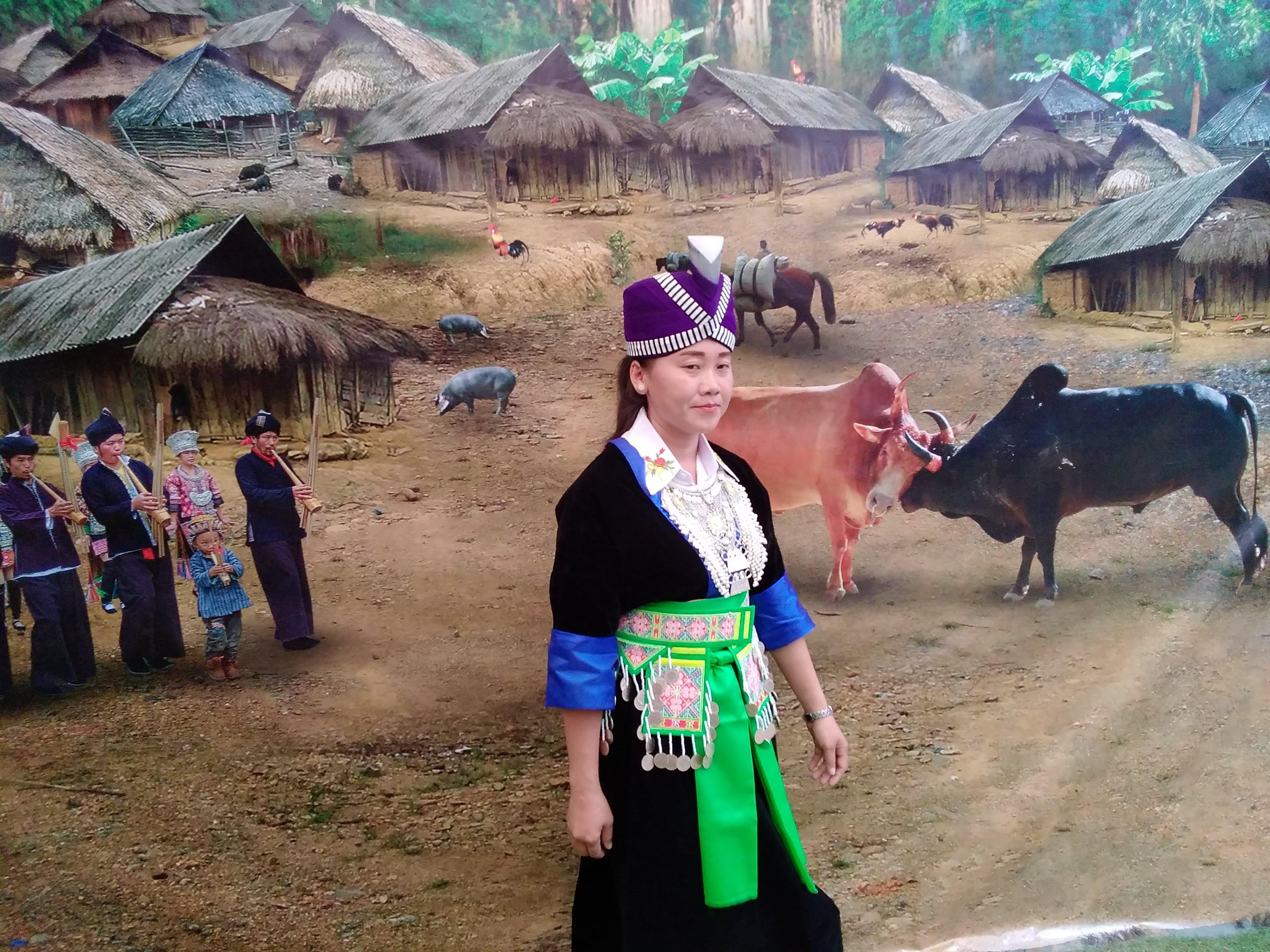
White Hmong woman wearing Hmong Daw clothing of Laos and Vietnam.

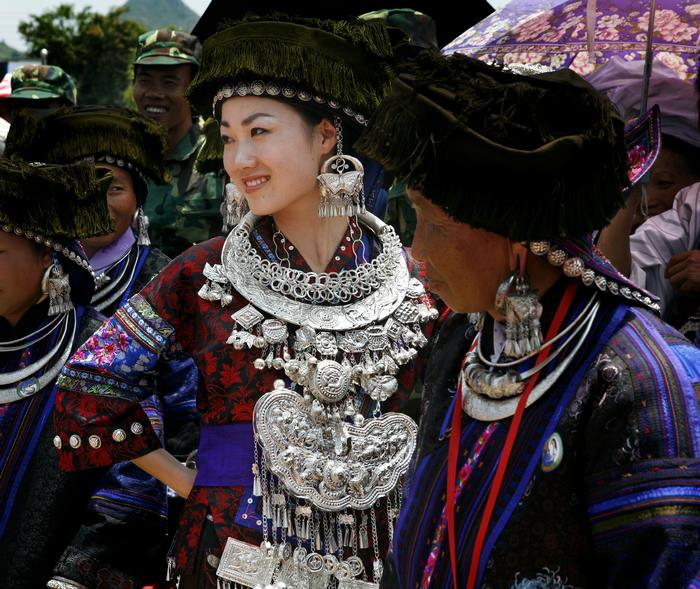
Clothing of Black Hmong's and also people in China.

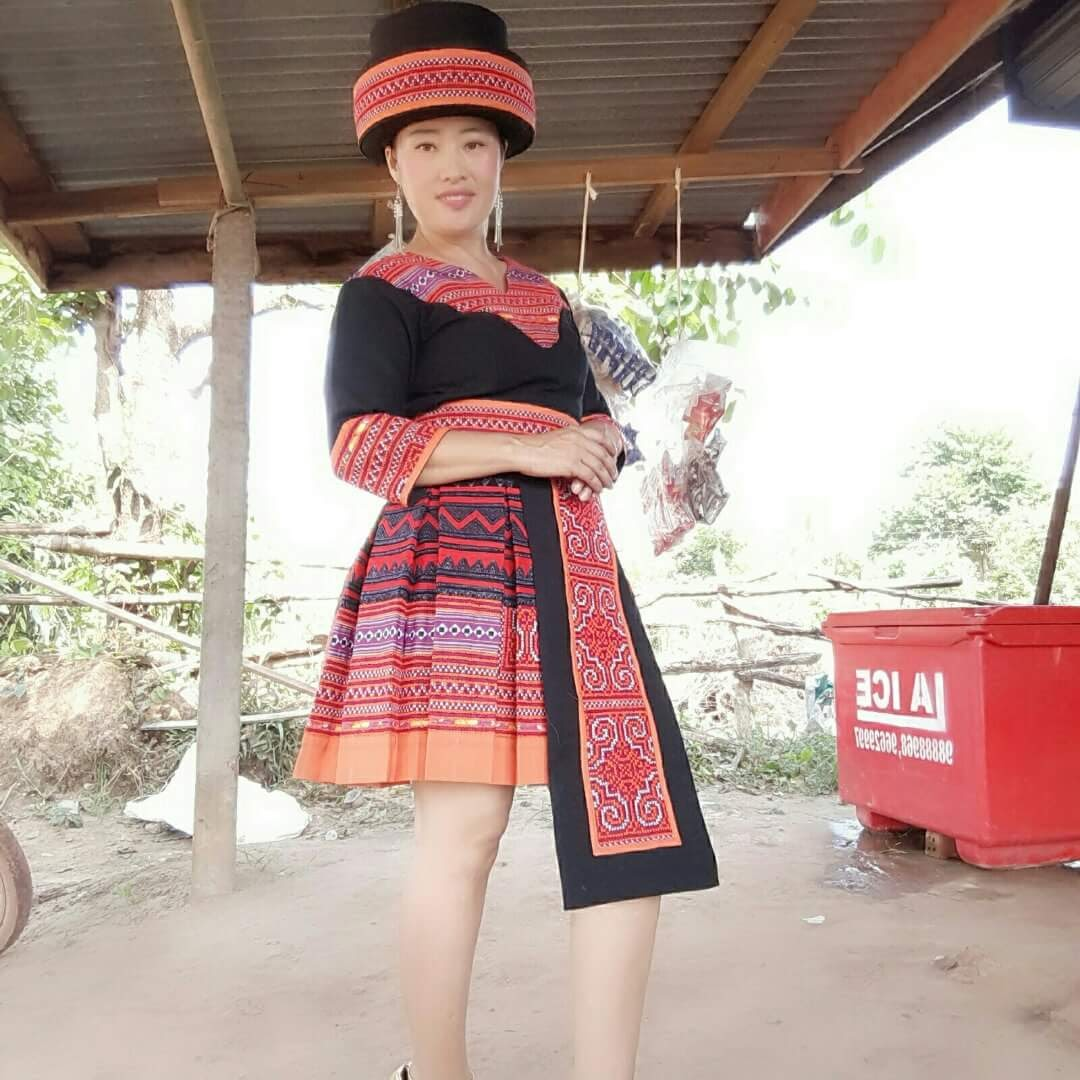
Green Hmong woman - wearing a traditional Green Hmong skirt.

The Miao/Hmong who live in Laos and Vietnam have their own language and culture. Their clothing differs by group. Identifying a Hmong on the street today is not easy. Before, people did so when they spoke their dialect or wore traditional clothing. Three major Miao ethnic groups live in Southeast Asia, particularly in northern Phongsali and Xam Neua province; eastern Xiangkhouang, Oudomxay, Pakxan, and Khammouane province; western Luang Prabang, Vang Vieng, and Vientiane province. The first group is the White Hmong ethnic (Hmong Daw), the second one is the Green Hmong or Hmong Green or Hmong Leng ethnic (Hmoob Leeg or Ntsuab), and the last one is the Black Hmong, Hmong Dou ethnic (Hmoob Dub). There are also some small Hmong ethnic groups like Hmong multicolor (Hmoob Txaij) and Hmong qua npab. These are few.

=== ChongBlia Yang ===
ChongBlia Yang, a Laotian citizen born to Miao or Hmong ethnic parents from the Yang tribal clan, was the paternal root of the Yang families of Ban Phou Pheung Noi.

ChongBlia was born and raised in Xam Neua and Xieng Khouang Province. He died in the late 1890s a few kilometers from Phonsavan. His ancestors were Miao Hmong Daw, who came from southern China's Guizhou Province via Vietnam before settling in Laos in the 18th century. He had three sons. The eldest son was PajNus and the younger two were named NomPov and NtsuaLw Yang. Some of his descendants, especially Chong Lo Yang, Nhia Pao Yang of the fourth and fifth generations, joined the troops of general Vang Pao, an ally of the United States in the CIA's Secret War. At the time, they lived in Ban Phou Pheung Noi. After the Vietnam War, his descendants dispersed to the United States, Canada, Laos and France.

== Education ==
In 1960, when Ban Phou Pheung Noi's first school was founded, the people of Ban Phou Pheung Noi were almost all illiterate. In the beginning, there were just over ten children and adolescents attending this elementary school, but the number increased steadily thereafter.

The teacher at the time was KaYing Yang (Nao Ying Yang), a descendant of ChongBlia Yang who lived in Ban Phou Pheung Noi. Due to secondary school problems in Ban Phou Pheung Noi village, Sam Thong's Samthong College was the only middle high school where students could continue their education after primary school in Xiangkhouang province. After the Vietnam War of 1961-1975, this school was abandoned. As of 2021, although some of the children at this school are now over sixty years old, some such as Doua Pao Yang are still alive in the United States, and are employed by Ramsey County, Minnesota and others in California.

== Politics ==
In 1960, Kong Le's military troops headed east to Muang Soui and Phonsavan, Plain of Jars, after attempting to overthrow the royal government in Vientiane, and members of the Yang clan in Ban Phou Pheung Noi were recruited to join the government army in Ban Pangpang to monitor Kong Le's troops. During their first six months of service, they fought him near Muang Soui. When the Vietnam War started in 1961 in Xiangkhouang province, members of the clan in Ban Phou Pheung Noi joined General Vang Pao at the Battle of Ban Pa Dong (Ban Pa Dong). These soldiers were allies of the CIA in its secret war in Laos. Some were killed, injured or disabled. In 2021, some Yangs from the Secret War still lived in the United States, particularly Minnesota, California and North Carolina.

== Economy ==
The Ban Phou Pheung Noi's households were farmers. The agriculture was mainly "hai or ray" (in lao ໄຮ່ ຫຼື ໄຮ່) meaning rice acres in the mountain or valley. The rice exploitation is based on dense forests in the mountains or in the valleys. This agriculture was the core of the main economy of the villagers in Ban Phou Pheung Noi. People worked on the farms, and some of the younger ones served in the army with General Vang Pao. Household income depended mainly on rice, corn and opium at that time. Rice is the staple food that all families need every day. Farms of villagers were a long distance from their homes. There was no transportation or cars at the time. In terms of animals, each family had about ten hens and roosters, then a few pigs. This was intended for the needs of the family afterwards. Few people raised cows and oxen due to a variety of family problems. In this village, there were no shops, only the huts among the mountains and forests.

=== Social media ===
When the Vietnam War broke out, American black and white animated films in English arrived for the first time in Ban Phou Pheung Noi. It was by American humanitarian work team. At the time, there was a Hmong named "Xiong Nt". He was working for the US humanitarian aid program, especially with Pop Buell. Usually, the Hmong man came once per month by US military helicopters in Ban Phou Pheung Noi for taking care of the projection. The movies were shown primarily at night in full moon about hygiene. Particularly, they addressed how people got sick, with malaria, fever and diarrhea; and taught about drugs, doctors, and hospitals.

Since the animated film was funny, it made people, including children, laugh when they saw a mosquito bite a person and then put germs in their blood. They laughed without understanding the subject. For a Phou Pheung Noi villager, western countries should be funny. No one knew what hygiene was at the end of the film. For the hill tribes, it was just a funny movie.

=== Science, Technology and Religion ===
Hospitals did not yet exist in the countryside, especially in Ban Phou Pheung Noi and others. People didn't even know what a hospital and a doctor were. In Ban Phou Pheung Noi, when a family member of the hill tribes got sick, people would go to a shamanist of the Miao folk religion. From this belief, whatever reason and cause are, whether it was illness or injury, demons and deceased family members were involved.

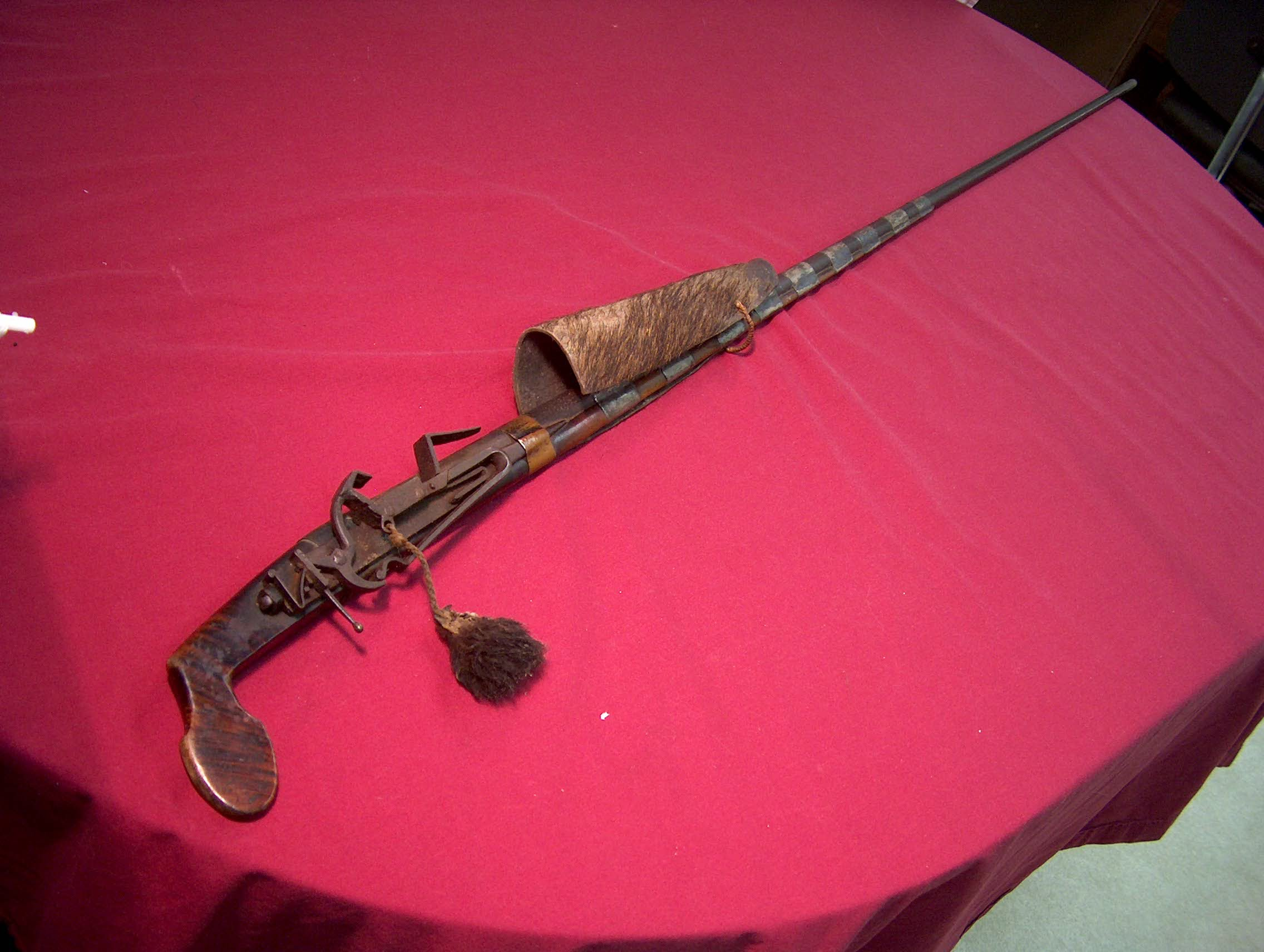
Hmong rifles (powder cartridges)

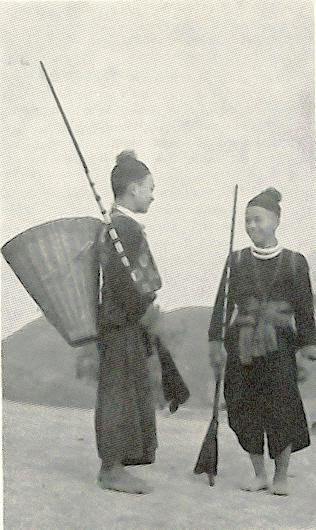
Hmong rifles (powder cartridges) in Ban Phou Pheung Noi at the beginning of the 20th century.

Regarding technology, TongChao Yang, a villager of the Yang family, could make rifles and powder cartridges by himself in Ban Phou Pheung Noi. He was an expert blacksmith of guns and jewelry, especially necklaces, earrings, rings, and also other household tool materials like axes, sickles, knives etc.

== See also ==
- Muang Soui
- Sam Thong
- Route 7 (Laos)
- Hmong New Year
- Tchao Anouvong cave
- Anouvong district
- Kuang Si Falls
- Luang Prabang Night Market
