= Sam Thong =

Town in Xiangkhouang, Laos

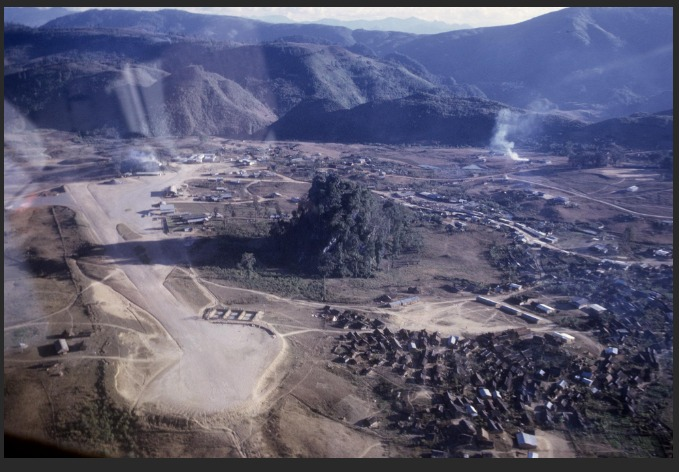
- City of Sam Thong in 1962s–1970s
- Interactive map of Sam Thong
- Coordinates: 19°10′47″N 102°53′24″E
- Country: Laos
- Province: Xaisomboun
- District: Longchaeng

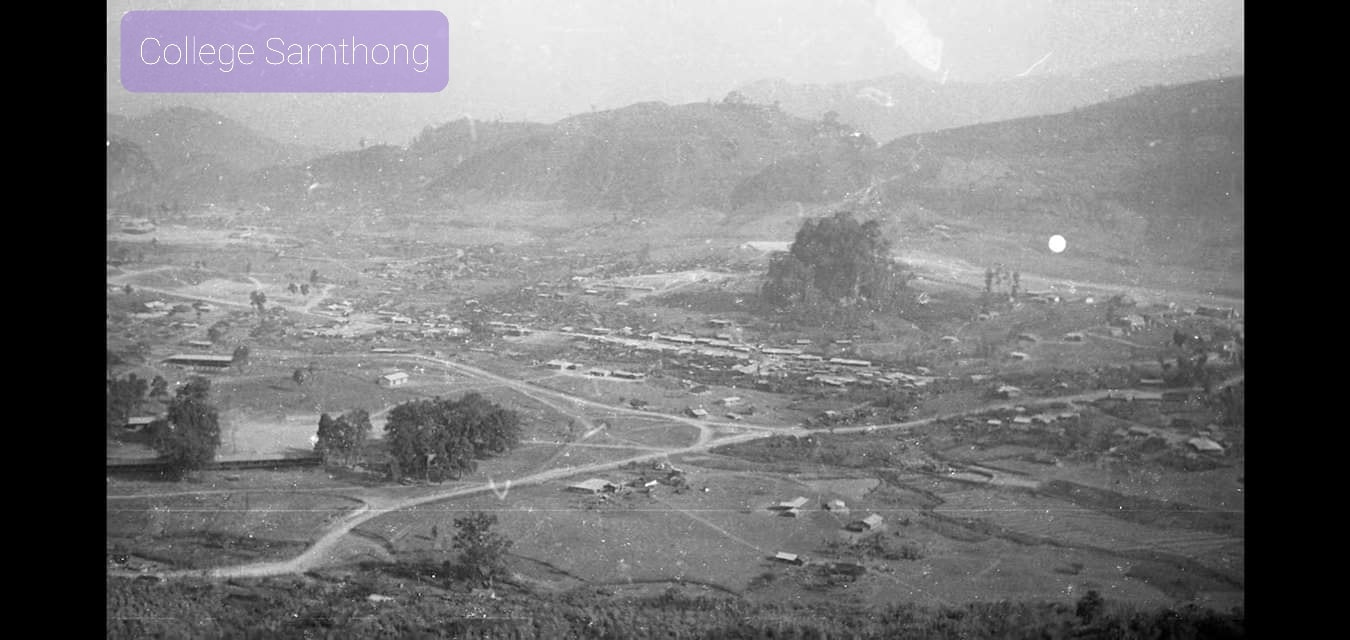
Sam Thong

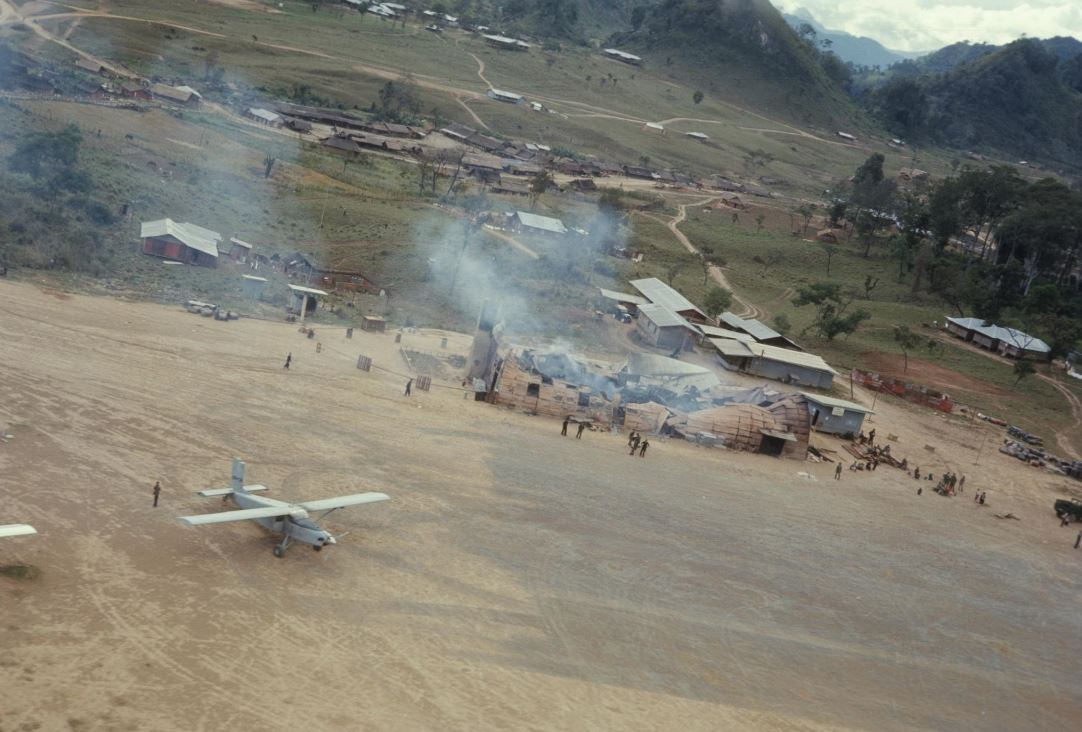
Sam Thong Airport at Sam Thong Laos During Vietnam War 1962 – 1970

Sam Thong (Lao: ຊຳທອງ, sometimes spelled Samthong) is a town in Xiangkhouang province, Laos. During the Vietnam War, it was the site of a USAID refugee operation center and an administrative center for much of northern Laos.

== Etymology ==
Chao means "prince", but is different when used with the words "Khueng" or "Muong, Mong, Mueang or Muang". Khueng means "province" and Muong, Mong, Mueang Muang is a "district". When Chao is combined with "Khueng" or "Muong", the meaning of Chao loses its "prince meaning" for follow the words of Khueng and Muong. Example, Chao Khueng means governor and Chao Muong means district head. As for others, Nai kong means "mini district chief", Tasseng means "county chief", Nai Ban means "village chief", and then Ban means "village".

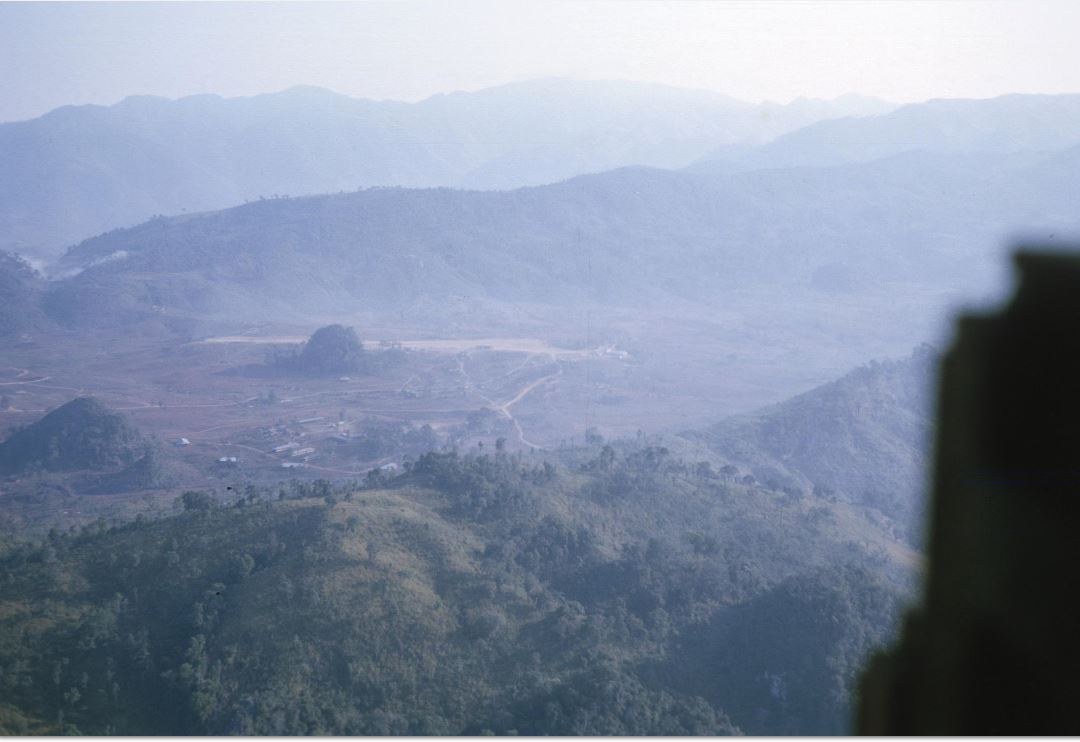
Panoramic view, c. Sam Thong city View From The Sky

== History ==
In 1950 the Meo (Hmong) ethnic group, Mr. Sia Ying Vue as Nai Kong (mini district chief), the refugee leader, Tasseng (county chief) Navang, Muong (province-state-district) Vangsai, Xiangkhouang Province, lived in Sam Thong with other ethnic groups. At that time, the Khmu, Lao Theung were the first inhabitants living there. All households were about 120 families there. People lived there until March 17, 1970, when Pathet Lao forces came to capture Sam Thong at 5 a.m.

During this period, particularly in early 1962, US forces established a refugee operation center in Sam Thong. The town was attacked by People's Army of Vietnam forces in March 1970 as part of Campaign 139, causing US personnel and their allies to withdraw. Royalist forces retook the town at the end of the month. In the course of the fighting, the town was significantly damaged by both PAVN ground forces and US-Royalist bombardments. Following the end of the Laotian Civil War in 1975, Sam Thong became part of the socialist Lao People's Democratic Republic.

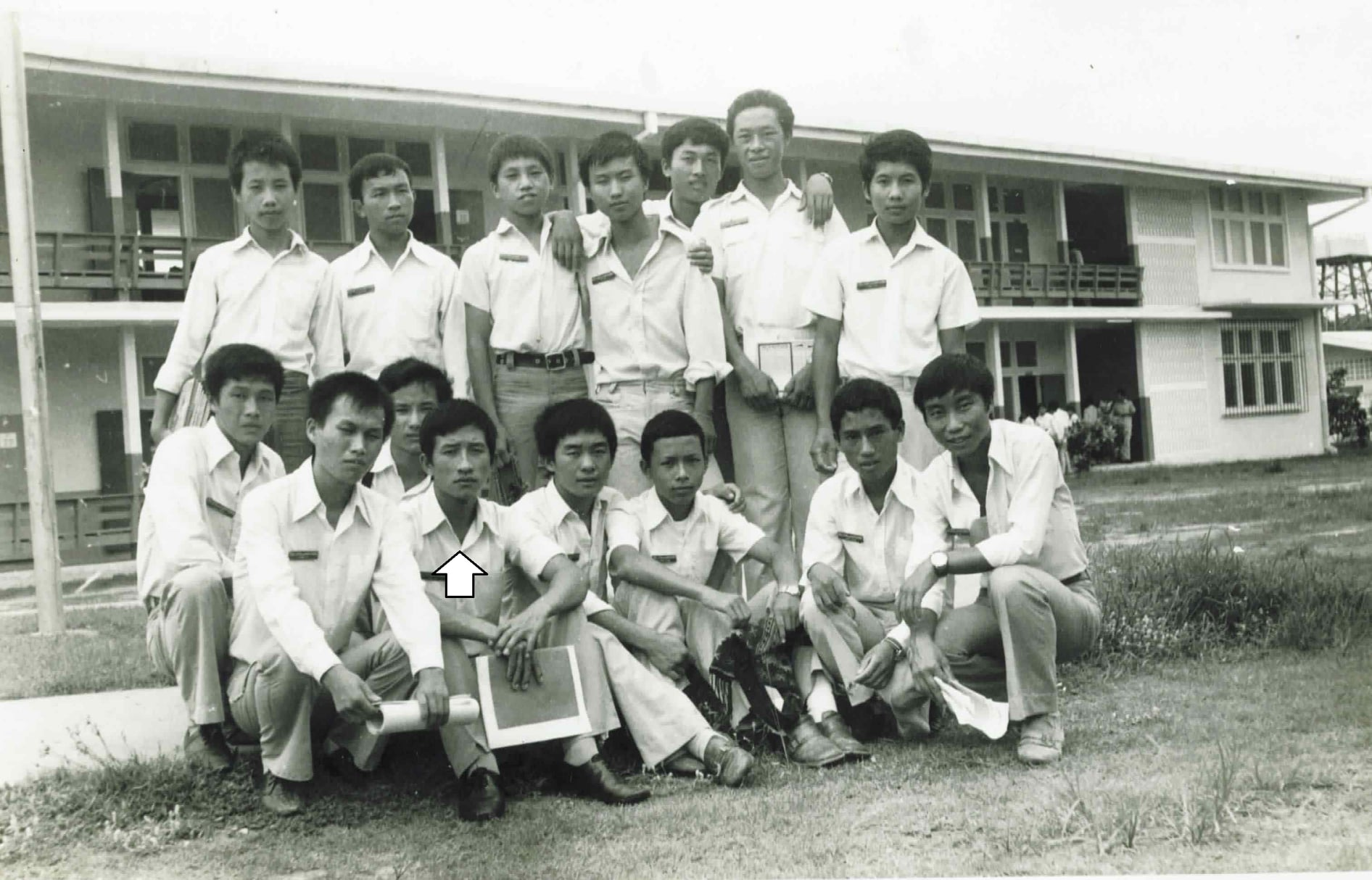
Students at a school in Sam Thong

== Government and politics ==
In 1949 the governor of Xiangkhouang province was Chao Saykham Southakakoumane. At that time, there were two deputy governors, one is Lao and the other is Hmong. For the Lao, it was Thongsavath Vongsavanthong. As for the Hmong, it was Touby Lyfoung. But he chose Youa Pao Yang to succeed him thereafter.

In December 1960, when Kong Le and his troops captured the Plain of Jars and Phonsavan, General Vang Pao and Xiangkhouang Governor Chao Saykham decided to settle in Sam Thong in 1962. This is where Xiangkhounag's administrative offices were later located. It was almost at the same time that the UDAID refugee operations center moved to Sam Thong.

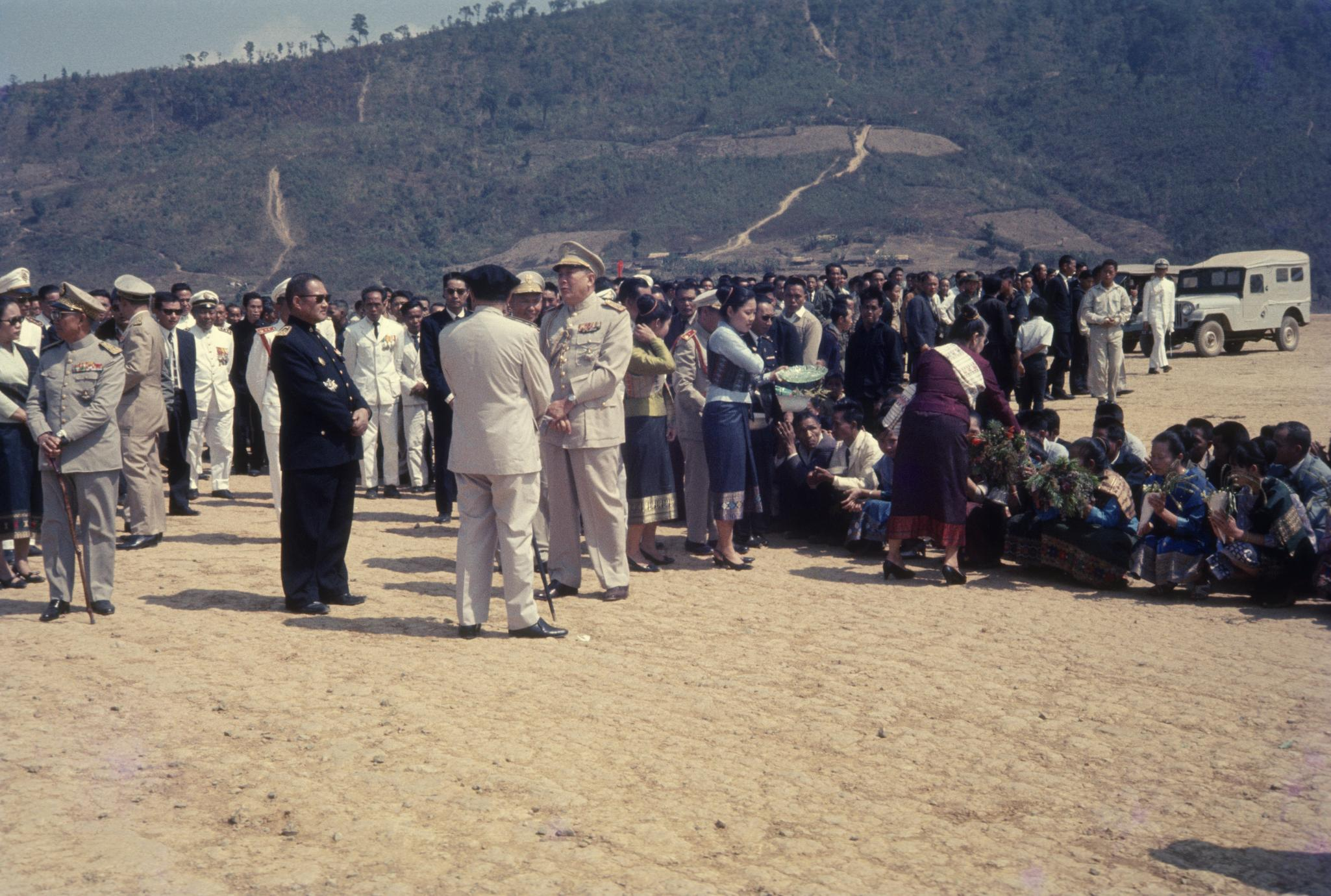
King Savang Vatthana, Chao Saykham (Xieng kouang governor), Prime Minister Souvanna Phouma, Gen. Vang Pao, and more others during king visit in Sam Thong.

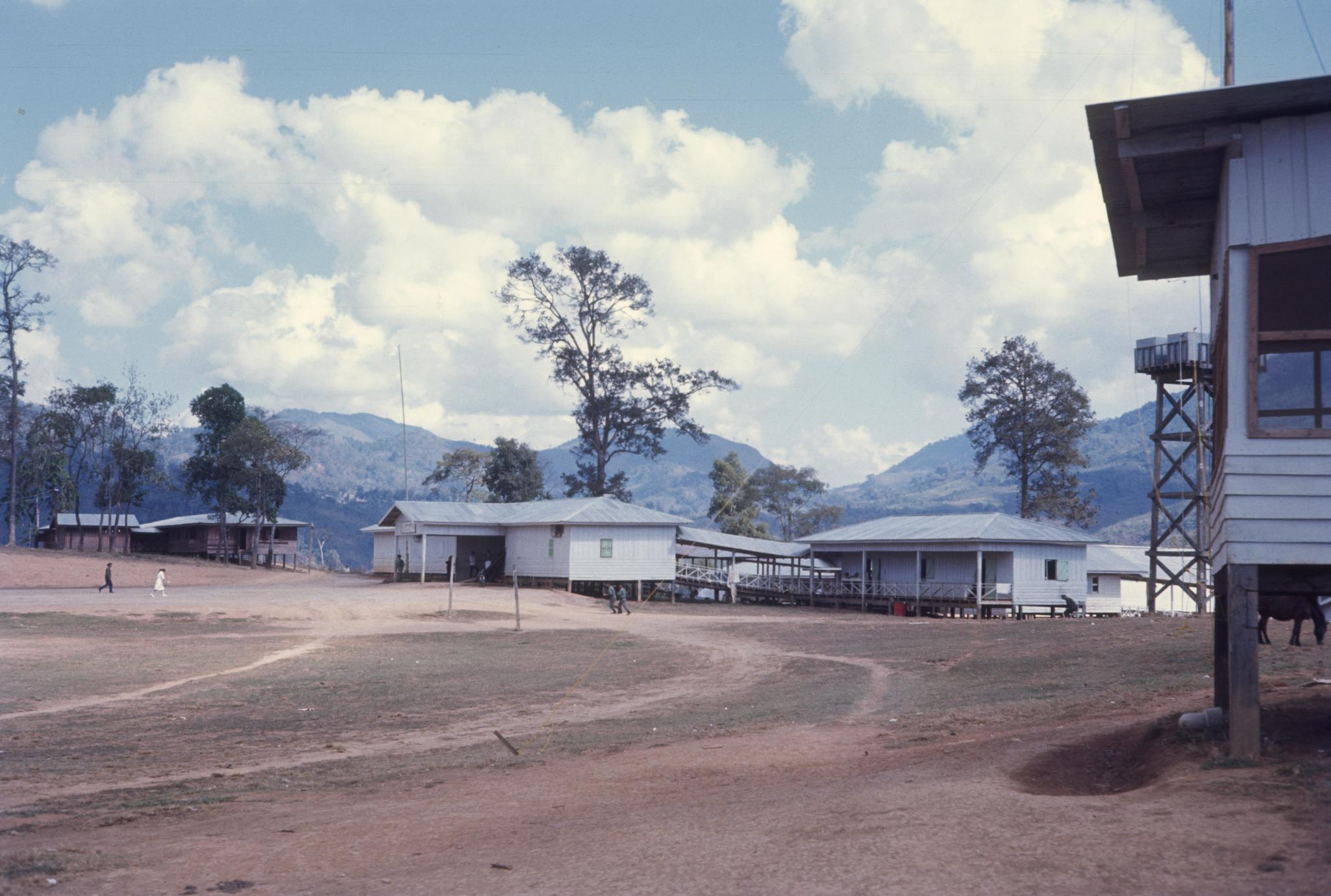
Sam Thong hospital in Xieng khouang Province during the Vietnam war 1961 – 1970.

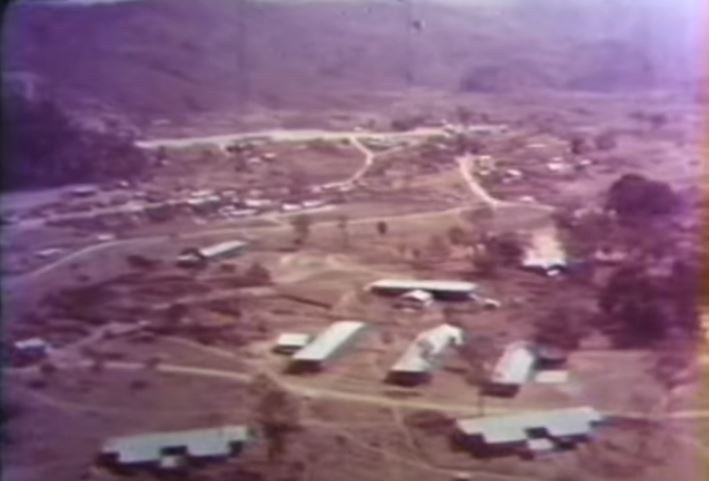
Sam Thong town – Buildings of college de Samthong (Sam Thong) during 1966 – 1970. See the black and white picture above.

Sam Thong became Xiengkhouang's main social-military-administrative office center during the CIA secret War. The offices of the governor, Chao Saykham Southakakoumane, and deputy governor, Youa Pao Yang, were about a mile and a half from the USAID warehouse office. Besides Sam Thong, its neighbor was Long Tieng, where the US Central Intelligence Agency military was stationed during the Vietnam War of 1961–1975.

In Sam Thong there was not only the governor, the police, Chao Muong (district chief), Nai Ban (village chief) and those of the school offices, there was also a public and military hospital of 150-beds built and equipped at Sam Thong in Xiengkhouang province which was called San Sook (Lao: ແສນສຸກ) and was the largest hospital serving all of northeaster Laos, especially in Xiangkhouang Province at the time. During this period, King Savang Vatthana (Lao: ຊະຫວ່າງ ວັດຖະນາ) and the Queen went to visit the Governor of Xiangkhouang and his people in Sam Thong to support the Lao and Hmong refugees, due to the war.

== Sam Thong college (School and educations) ==
At the time of Vietnam War there was a middle high school called Sam Thong college or Samthong college (ໂຮງຮຽນ ມັດທະຍົມ ຊຳທອງ) in Sam Thong. It was founded in 1966. The first principal was Professor Khamleck, then followed by Tou-Fu Vang in September 1969 before school moving to Vientiane in Fa Ngum High School at Sokpaluang.

When the school opened its doors, there were about thirty five students. It was the beginning of the class of 6th B. The following year, there were two classes, one of which was the class of 6th B, then the other was the class of 6th A. Each year, the school added a higher class to go to 3rd (grade 9th). As the number of students increased steadily every year, only students who passed the entrance exams were admitted. Then, only the best grades were accepted. This was the secondary education policy in Laos at that time.

Due to the lack of education policy before France's protectorate, secondary education in Laos did not exist. Students who wanted to continue their secondary studies had to go to Vietnam. When Sam Thong college was founded, starting from the class 6th (grade 6th), teaching was all in French. No matter what mathematics, geography, history, and others are, the system of the secondary education in Laos was almost part in French language, especially in middle and high schools. Lao's national education started to develop only thereafter Auguste Pavie, arrived in Luang Prabang, Laos, in 1893.

Sam Thong middle high school was ranked the highest one in Xiangkhouang province, due to its teaching classes of 6th B, 6th A, 5th, 4th, and 3rd (grade 9th). The class of 3rd (grade 9th) was in Muangcha, Muang Xaisomboun province, in 1974/75. Besides Sam Thong college, the other schools of the Xiangkhouang province were almost primary schools.

In 1970 Campaign 139 poisoned the city of Sam Thong, forcing Samthong middle high school to move to Vientiane to set up its classrooms in the buildings of Fa Ngum High School in Sokpaluang. The installation came from the Ministry of National Education of Laos. It should be for only a few months, but it lasted for years. For that year, there were classes from 6th B – up to 4th. Few months after moving to Vientiane, Tou-Fu Vang, a bachelor's degree, who was the Principal at the time and Wangyee Vang, a mathematic teacher, resigned their position then went to join the army of General Vang Pao. It was then that he was replaced by Maxime Lesage, a Frenchman of Puducherry (union territory) origin, as principal starting 1971/72 school year.

In 1974 it was when the war ended, the country came under the political supervision of the Lao People's Democratic Republic party, Sam Thong middle high school returned to the province of Muang Xaisomboun province, which was the former province of Xiangkhouang before, where Maxime Lesage is replaced by Pr Ly Chao as the new Principal of Sam Thong Middle High School. Starting from 1974/75 school year, the national education administration of Xiangkhouang and the boards of Sam Thong middle high school with the Director of the school decided to add teachers and two more grade 6th preparatory classes. This is to increase more students in Sam Thong middle high school for years to come. These extra-classes were called "School Lao Huamphao".

In May 1975, a year after the school moved to Muang Xaisomboun Province (Muangcha) from Fa Ngum High School in Sokpaluang, Vientiane, there was a political disaster in Laos. Problems arise between the people and the politics of the Lao People's Democratic Republic. Thus, Sam Thong college's students fled their homes with their families to refugee camps in Thailand to seek political asylum. And then, Sam Thong Middle High School has since been closed.

After the Vietnam war most of the students of this middle high school, especially the Sam Thong college, left their hometown to flee the country, which was Laos, with their parents to go to western countries which are the United States for the most part, then to France, Australia and Canada.

As for notable alumni students of Sam Thong college, there was Lormong Lo. He attended Sam Thong middle high school in Xiengkhouang Province from 1972 to 1975. Then, he fled Laos with his family to a refugee camp in Thailand in 1975. Thus, he immigrated to the United States thereafter. He was the first Hmong American to be appointed to a city council in the U.S., in June 1994, where he managed the largest city (Omaha—480,000 people) in the state of Nebraska. He replaced Joe Friend, who resigned.

== See also ==
- Ban Phou Pheung Noi
- Route 7 (Laos)
- Muang Soui
- Hmong New Year
- Tchao Anouvong cave
- Anouvong district
- Kuang Si Falls
