= Route 3 (Laos) =

Road in Laos

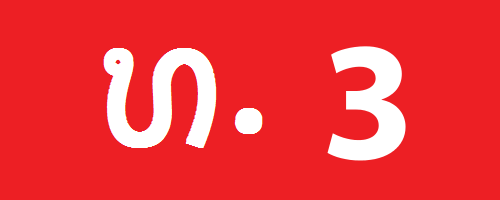
Route 3

Route information
- Part of AH3
- Maintained by Government of Laos
- Length: 197 km (122 mi)

Major junctions
- East end: Nateuy; Route 13
- West end: Huai Xai; Fourth Thai–Lao Friendship Bridge; Thailand Route 1152

Location
- Country: Laos
- Major cities: Nateuy, Luang Namtha, Huai Xia

Highway system
- Transport in Laos

Route 3 is an important link in the north of Laos between China and Thailand. The 197 km route begins in the provincial capital Luang Namtha, Louang Namtha Province, Laos, which is connected to Mohan, China and the Chinese G8511 expressway by Laos Route 13.

It runs southwestwards reaching the provincial capital of Ban Houayxay, Bokeo Province, on river Mekong, where it crosses the Fourth Thai-Lao Friendship Bridge. China is interested in improving traffic routes to Southeast Asia, to be jointly financed with Thailand. China has the main share in the expansion of highways in Laos. The Laotian section is part of the Kunming–Bangkok Expressway, which is part of the Asian Highway AH3.
