= Route 7 (Laos) =

Route 7 of Laos

Laos Route 7 (ເສັ້ນ ທາງ ເລກ 7 ຂອງ ປະເທດລາວ)
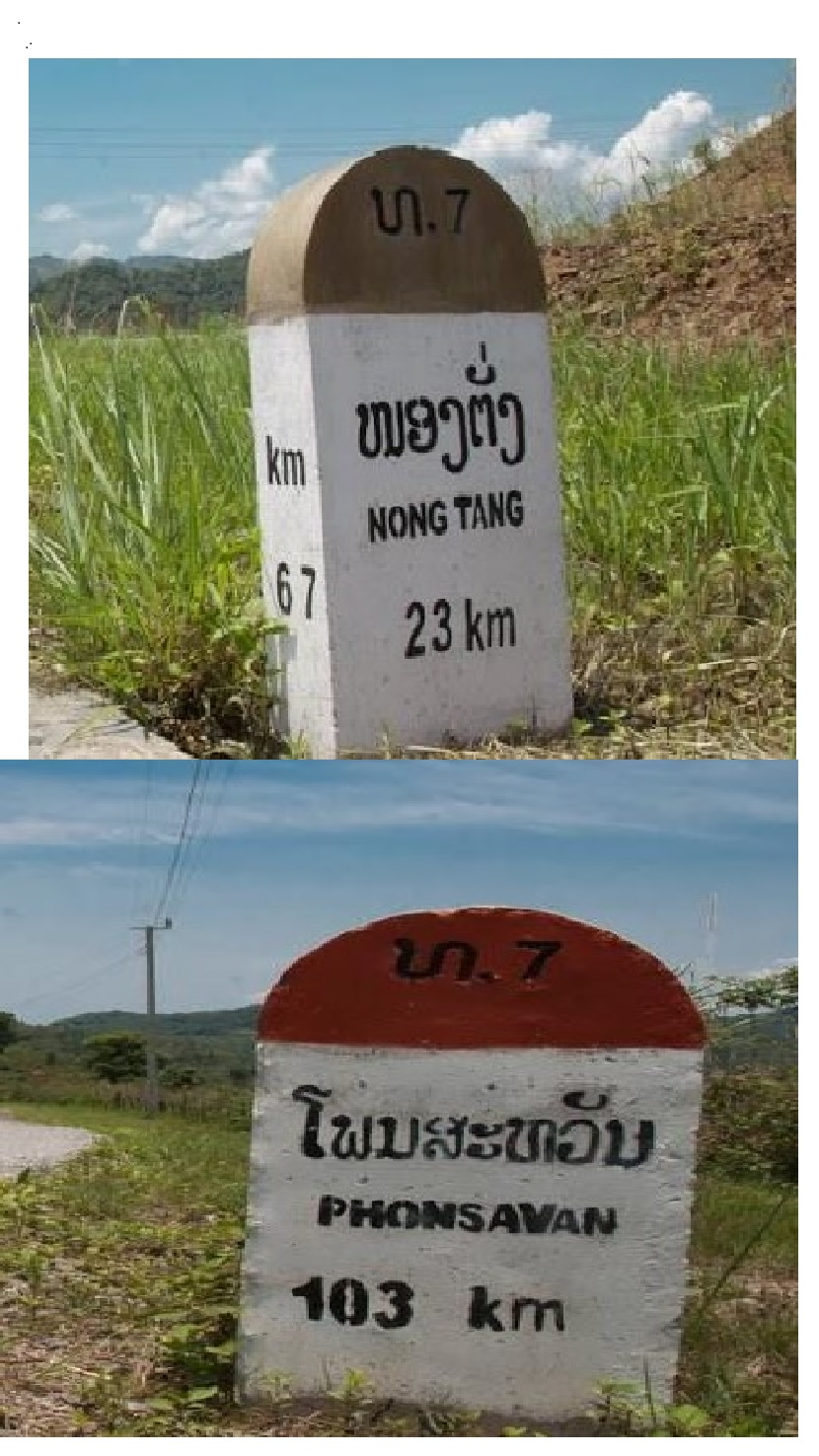
- Route 7 of Laos country (ເສັ້ນ ທ. 7 ຂອງປະເທດລາວ)
- Country: Laos
- Province: Xiangkhouang
- Length_km: 250
- Terminus_3: Nong Het
- Terminus_4: Phou Khoun

Route 7 of Laos, ເສັ້ນ ທາງ ເລກ 7 ຂອງປະເທດລາວ (ທ. 7) is a provincial road served from east to west in Xiangkhouang province, Laos. It runs from Nong Het in the east to Phoukhoune District in the west. This is where people change connections to go to Luang Prabang or Vientiane.

== History ==
Route 7 (Laos) is built in the early 1905 by a Resident, Mr. Sestier. It started from Vinh to Cua-rao, Vietnam, then to Muong-sen and Tran-Ninh, the former capital of Xieng khouang at the time, in XiangKhouang province, Laos, for a distance of 402 kilometers. During construction, a credit of 300,000 piastres was granted by Mr. Beau, one of the Governor Generals of Indochina at the time. Subsequently, the road was abandoned due to costly maintenance and upkeep.

Afterwards, in 1911, it was taken over by a vigorous administrator-creator, Mr. Barthelemy, government commissioner of the Laotian province of Tran-Ninh (Xiangkhouang Plateau), XiangKhouang Province. It was undertaken following the trip that MR. Albert Sarraut, Governor General of Indochina, made Tran-Ninh in 1911. History of this route 7, especially at that time, the part before Cua-rao which is located in Vietnam bears the name of Mr. Sestier. Then the other after Cua-rao bears the name of MR. Barthelemy, the current Xiengkhouang Government Commissioner at that time. This was the period that the French controlled the former Lao Kingdom Lan Xang.

Nong Het is the first city in Laos where Route 7 is passing, especially in the northeast. This city is only a few kilometers from the border of the two countries, Laos and Vietnam. From 1916, it was extended to Muong-sen and Ban Bane, two neighboring villages located on the Route 7 near Muang Kham, Laos. Then, it went to expand to Ban Khang Khai, a village located northeast of Phonsavan, then to Phonsavan, the Plain of Jars and Muang Soui thereafter. Construction of Route 7 is completed in March 1923 at the same time with those Routes 8 and 9 which are located in the central and southern of Laos.

For the part which is from Muang Soui/Nongtang to Phoukhoune District the construction was French-built at the beginning of the 1940s. Route 7 serves actually cities of Nong Het, Muang Kham, Laos, Phonsavan, Muang Soui/Nongtang, and then Phoukhoune District. The total distance from Nong Het to Phoukhoune District (Sala Phou Khoun) is approximately 249.9 kilometers.

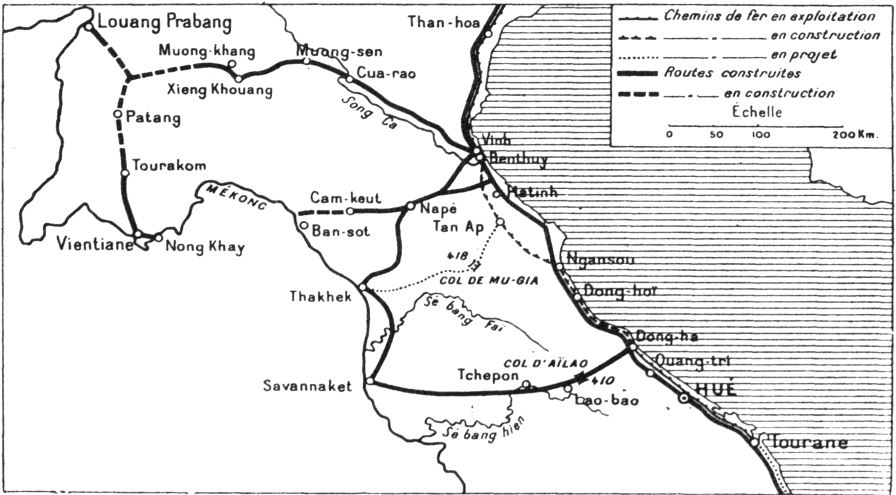
In 1923 – MAP Annam Routes in Laos – Route 7 of Xiengkhouang, Laos

== Intersections ==
=== Nong Het (ເມືອງໜອງແຮດ Nroog Looj Hej) ===
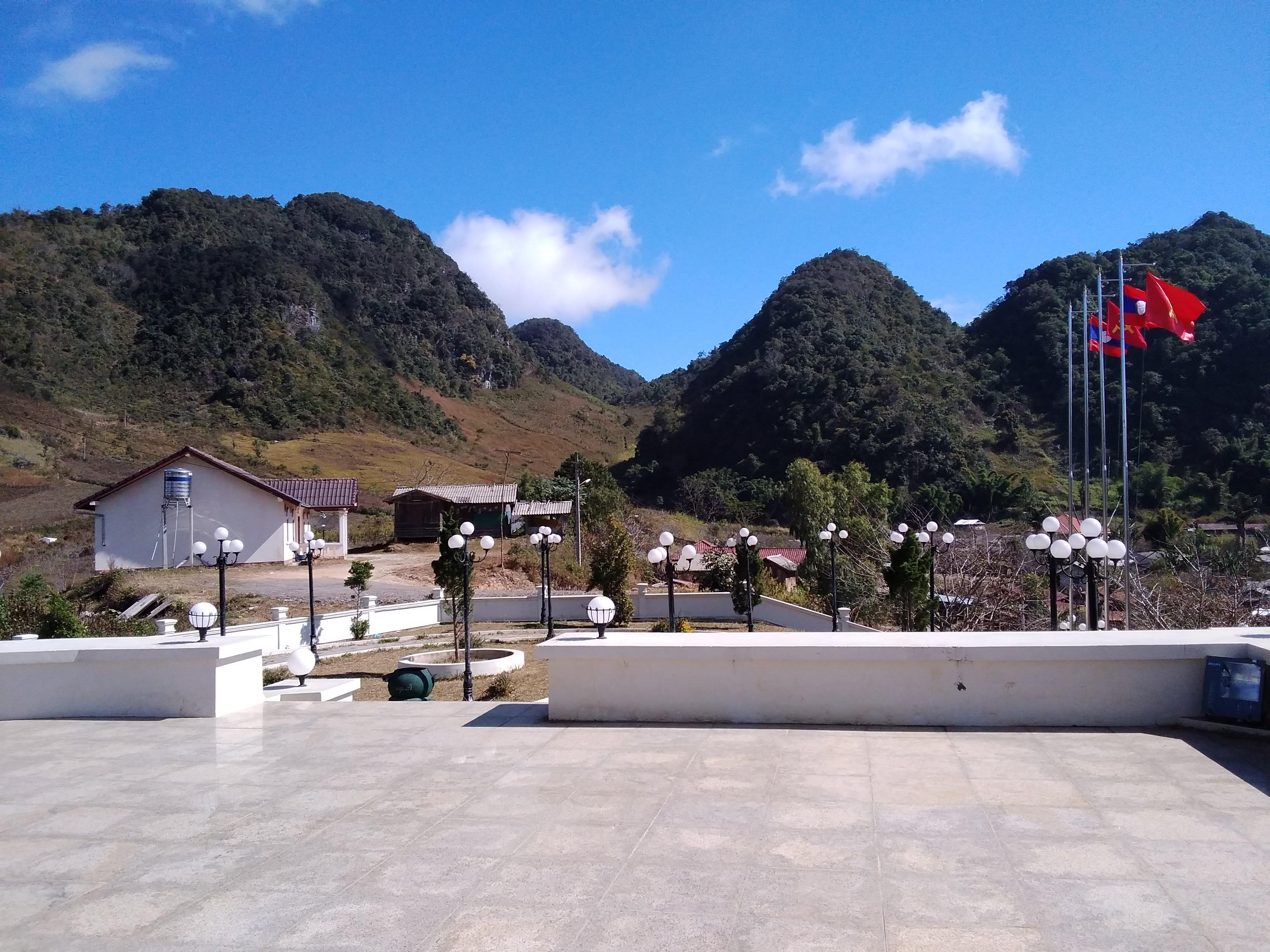
Muang Nong Het, Xiangkhouang, Laos

Whether before or now, Route 7 is the direct access between Laos and Vietnam, especially in northeastern Laos. The city of Nong Het was founded a little over a century ago. It is only a few kilometers from the Vietnamese border. It was a city where there were many Hmong/Miao people lived there in the past, especially before the Vietnam War. Driving from Nong Het to Muang Kham, Laos, the distance is about 64.4 km.

=== Muang Kham, Laos (ເມືອງຄຳ) ===
Muang Kham is a small town located northeast of Phonsavan about 55.1 km. On the Route 7 coming from Phonsavan to north and east, about 18 km from Muang Kham, there are two hot mineral springs. The larger one has been developed as a resort with bungalows and bathing facilities. Both are located less than a mile from Route 7. In downtown of Muang Kham, Route 7 runs through the middle of town and heads straight to Nong Het. To go to Samneua or Houaphanh province, intersection of Route 1C is on the left in downtown.

=== Phonsavan (ມ.ໂພນສະຫວັນ Nroog Phoov Xab Vam) ===
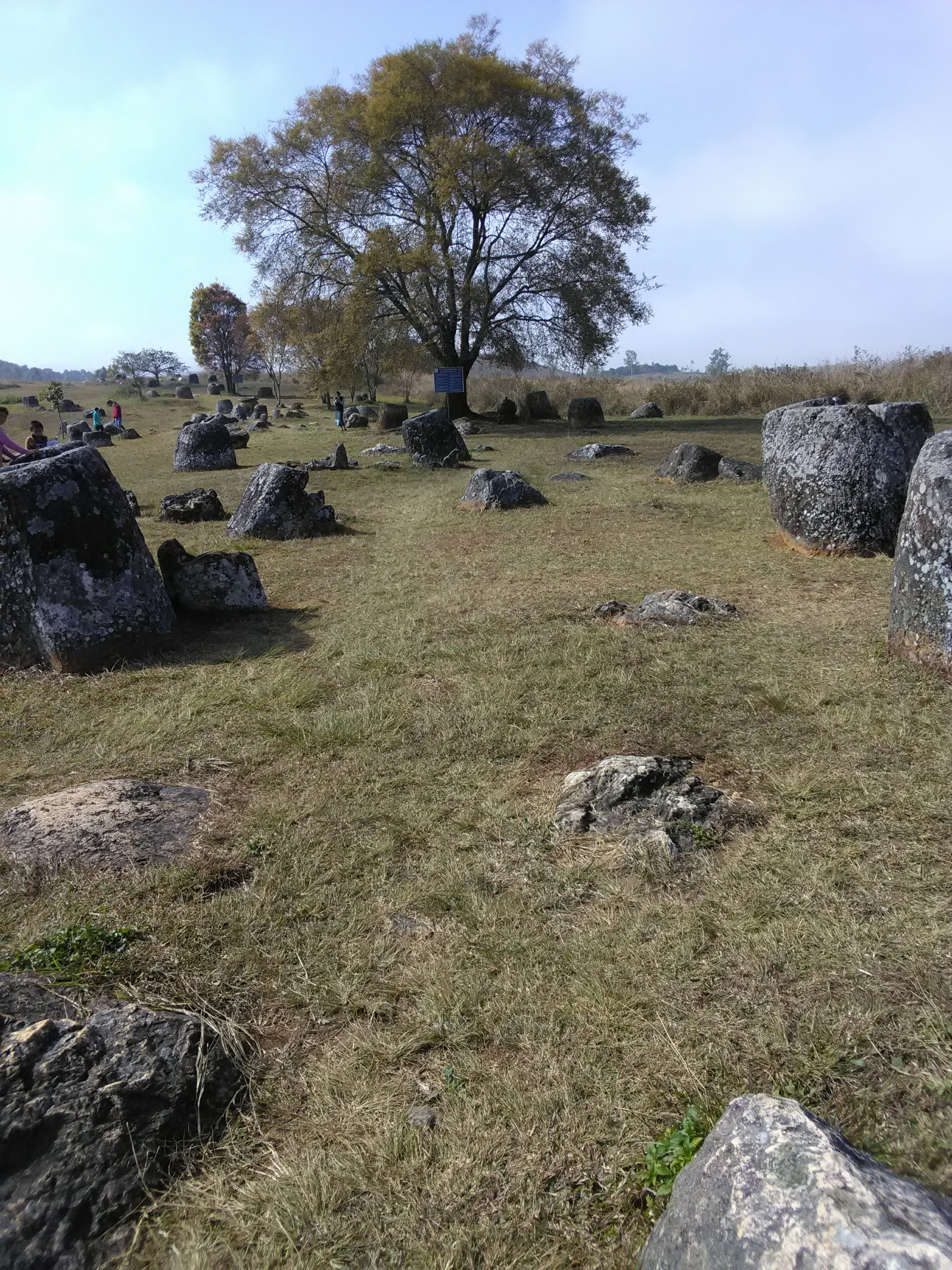
Plain of Jars at Phonsavan in Xiengkhouang, Laos

The intersection of Route 7 (Laos) and the other ones that go to south, especially to Muang Thuang, Muang Khoun, and passing through Paksan, etc. is located in Phonsavan downtown. Phonsavan is the capital of Xiangkhouang province. It is the city from which the US had dropped thousands of bombs during the Vietnam War of 1961–1975. The Plain of Jars, a UNESCO World Heritage Site, is located less than 13 km from Phonsavan downtown.

=== Muang Soui /Nongtang (ເມືອງສຸຍ Moos Xoy ===
Muang Soui was the name of the town until the end of 1975. After the Vietnam War, Muang soui reverted to Nong Tang as it was before. This city of Muang Soui which is Nong Tang today is located in between the east and the west which are Nong Het and Luang prabang. The distance between Muang Soui and Phonsavan is about 47.2 km to the east, and 89.4 km to Phoukhoune which is west.

=== Phoukhoune District (ເມືອງພູຄູນ Roob Phuv Khoo ===
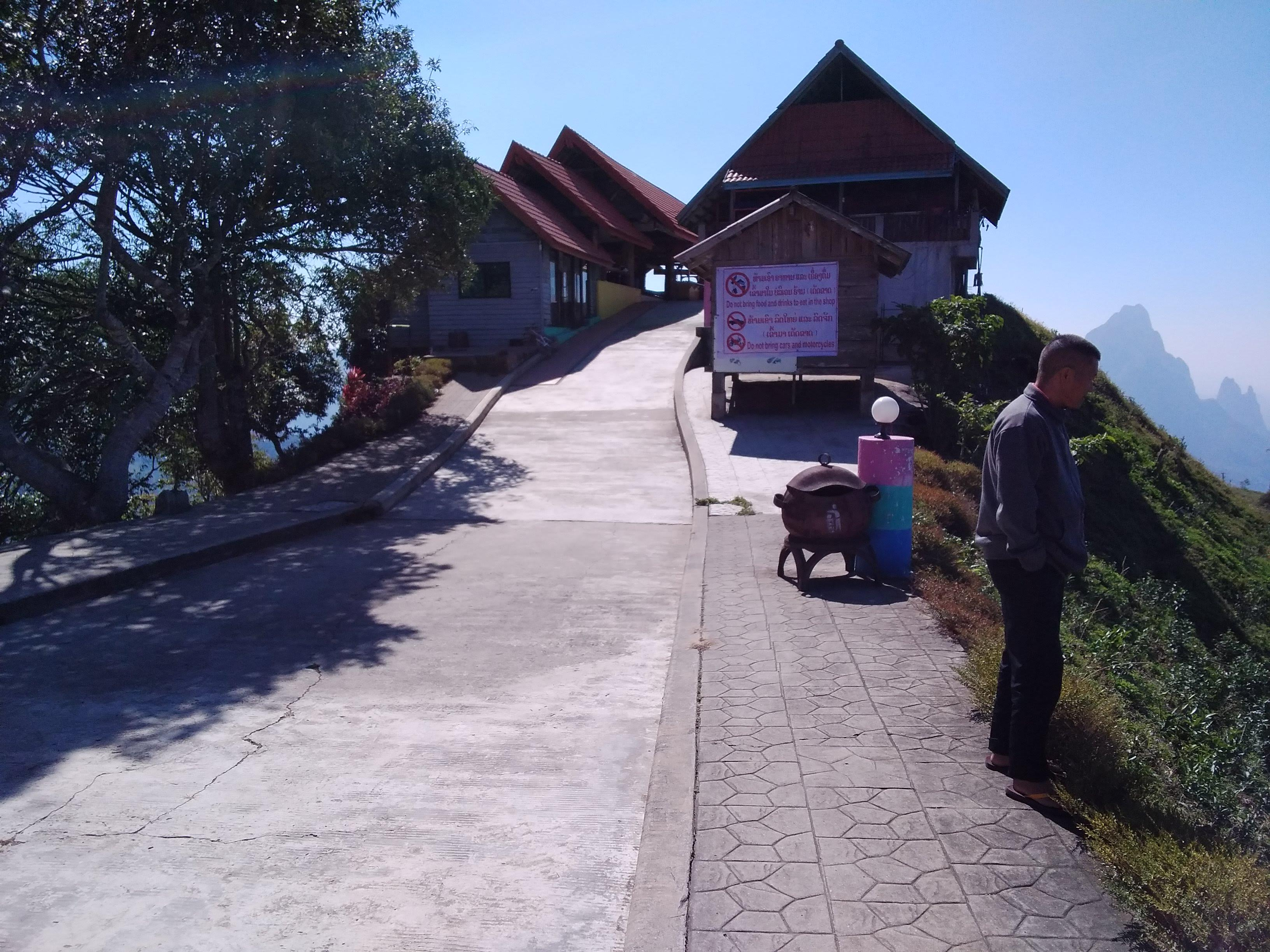
Intersection Route 7 at Phoukhoune District, Laos

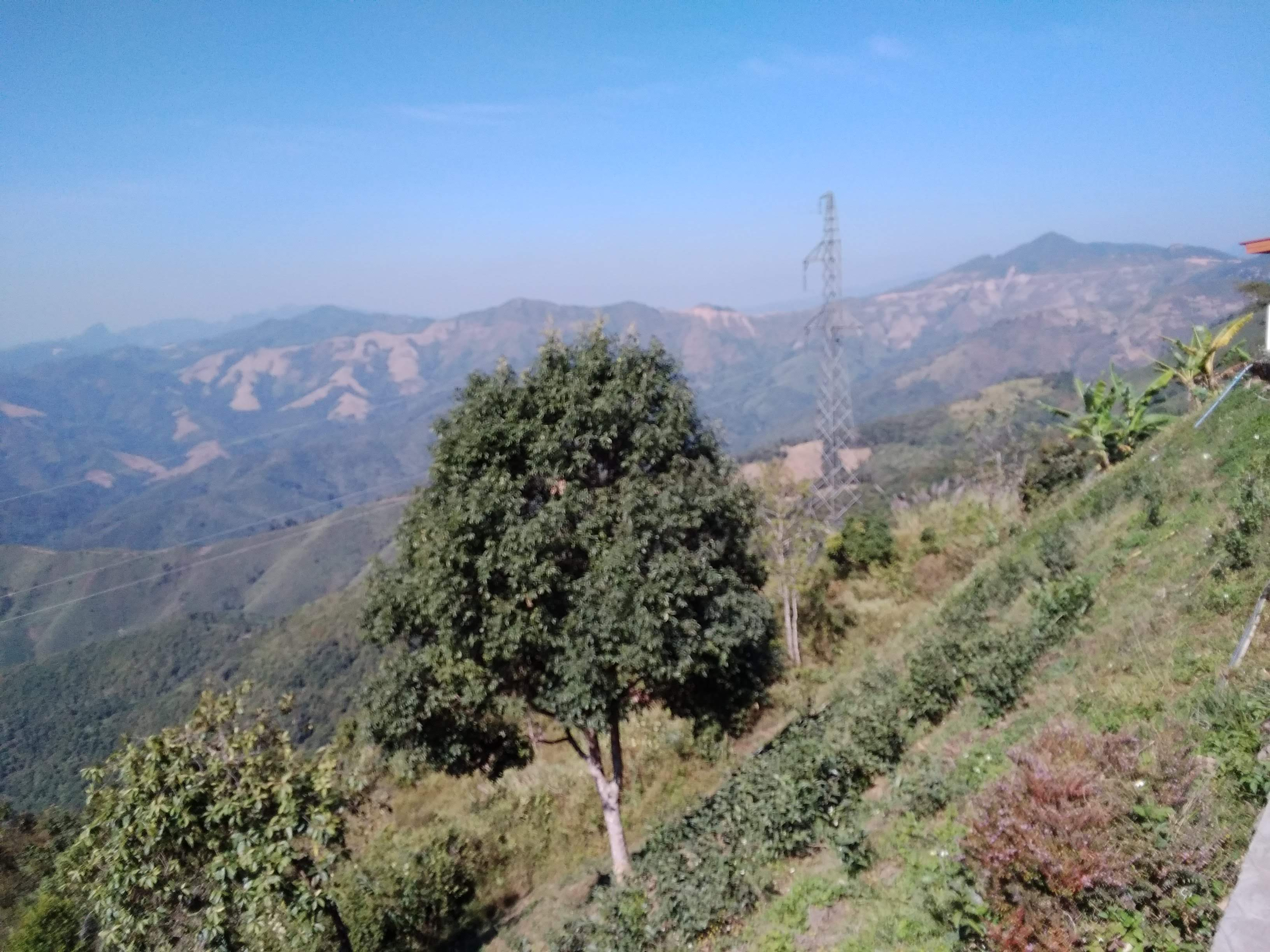
Intersections and scenic view at Sala Phoukhoune District in Laos

Phoukhoune or Phou Khoun is a small town located on the top of the mountain called Phoukhoune or Phou Khoun. It lies northeast of Vang Vieng and west of Muang Soui and Ban Phou Pheung Noi. Route 7 is built over the mountains and valleys from then Muang Soui.

Arrived at Phoukhoune, there is an intersection of Route 13 with Route 7 This is the connection comes from Vang vieng to go to Luang prabang. Some people call the city of three way stops coming from Vang vieng, Luang prabang, and Phonsavan. This refers in particular for travelers who wish to change connections to go to Luang prabang, Phonsavan, or Vang vieng. Phoukhoune District is 99.4 km from Vang Vieng, and 127.9 km from Luang Prabang.

== See also ==
- Ban Phou Pheung Noi
- Muang Soui
- Sam Thong
- Hmong New Year
- Tchao Anouvong cave
- Anouvong district
- Kuang Si Falls
- Luang Prabang Night Market
