= Kunming–Bangkok Expressway =

International road in Asia

Kunming–Bangkok Road
- Traditional Chinese: 昆曼公路
- Simplified Chinese: 昆曼公路
Transcriptions
Standard Mandarin
- Hanyu Pinyin: Kūnmàn Gōnglù
- Wade–Giles: K'unman Kunglu

Kunming–Bangkok Expressway
- Traditional Chinese: 昆曼高速公路
- Simplified Chinese: 昆曼高速公路
Transcriptions
Standard Mandarin
- Hanyu Pinyin: Kūnmàn gāosùgōnglù
- Wade–Giles: K'unman kaosukunglu

Kunming-Bangkok-Expressway

Kunming–Bangkok Expressway is a proposed international expressway running from Kunming, Yunnan province, People's Republic of China, to Bangkok, Thailand via Laos. The first expressway sections were opened in 2008.

The expressway will be approximately 1,900 km (1,200 mi) in length when complete; about 730 km (450 mi) was completed from Kunming via Xiaomenyang to Jinghong) and crossing the Lao border at Mohan, all in Yunnan, by 2017 and the next 250 km (160 mi) of the expressway, south of China within Laos follows Route 13, then Route 3.

It was jointly funded by China, Laos, Thailand and the Asian Development Bank.

It traverses jungle and highlands in southern Yunnan and Northern Laos before entering Thailand at Chiang Khong. It then continues southward, largely following Thai Route 1, which becomes an Expressway standard road near Bangkok but which is largely an at-grade dual carriageway along most of its length within Thailand. Within Laos, as of May 2019 the road is an undivided two lane highway.

Section	Length (km)^{1}	National Route	Status and comments
Yunnan, CN
Kunming – Yuxi	(86 km (53 mi))	G8511	6-lane expressway completed (1999)
Yuxi – Yuanjiang	(112 km (70 mi))	G8511	4-lane expressway completed (2000)
Yuanjiang – Mohei	(147 km (91 mi))	G8511	Expressway Completed (Dec 2003)
Mohei – Simao	(71 km (44 mi))	G8511	Expressway Completed (Apr 2011)
Simao – Xiaomenyang	(97 km (60 mi))	G8511	Expressway Completed (Apr 2006)
Xiaomenyang – Mohan/Boten	(217 km (135 mi))	G8511	Expressway Completed
LAO
Mohan/Boten (Yunnan) – Nateuy	(20 km (12 mi))	Route 13	Highway Completed (Vientiane–Boten Expressway planning)
Nateuy – Luang Namtha – Ban Houayxay	(242 km (150 mi))	Route 3	Highway Completed
TH
Fourth Thai–Lao Friendship Bridge – Chiang Khong	(18 km (11 mi))	1356	Divided highway
Chiang Khong – Chiang Rai	(113 km (70 mi))	1020	Divided highway alt route 1174/1098/1173 under construction
Chiang Rai – Chai Nat	(562 km (349 mi))	1	Divided highway (named Phahonyothin Road)
Chai Nat – Bang Pa-In	(194 km (121 mi))	32	Divided highway
Bang Pa-In – Bangkok	(49 km (30 mi))	1/31	Divided highway (named Phahonyothin Road & Vibhavadi Rangsit Road)

^{1}Some distances on existing roads if expressway distances unavailable

Expressways also planned or under construction: Kunming to Mandalay (Burma) and Kunming to Hanoi (Vietnam). Expressway completed between Vang Vieng and Vientiane in 2020.

== See also ==
- Asian Highway Network AH1, AH2, AH3
- China National Highways
- Thai highway network
- Phahonyothin Road
