= AH3 =

Route of the Asian Highway Network

Asian Highway 3

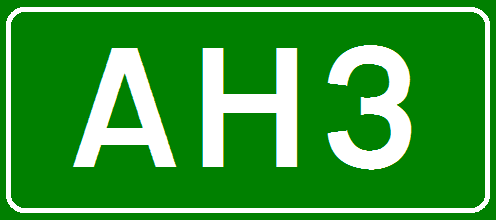

Major junctions
- North end: Ulan Ude, Russia
- South end: Chiang Rai, Thailand

Location
- Countries: Russia, Mongolia, China, Myanmar, Laos, Thailand

Highway system
- Asian Highway Network
← AH2	→ AH4

Asian Highway 3 (AH3) is a route of the Asian Highway Network which runs 7,331 km (4,555 mi) from Ulan-Ude, Russia (on AH6) to Tanggu, China; and Shanghai, China (on AH5) to Chiang Rai, Thailand and Kengtung, Myanmar (both on AH2).

== Southeast Asian issues ==
By mid-2008 the North-South Corridor segment of the Asian Highway, AH-3, was nearly fully paved, with only a few kilometers incomplete.

The North-South Corridor Project has been on the Asian Development Bank's (ADB) agenda since 1993 and aimed to improve the connected economies of China, Myanmar, Laos, Vietnam, Thailand and Cambodia. The portion of the North-South Corridor known as Highway 3, which runs through northwestern Laos and connects China and Thailand, was expected to cost US$95.8 million and was being financed with a loan from the ADB, along with funds from the Chinese, Thai and Lao governments.

The completed sections of the road have gone from being little more than dirt roads a few years ago to two-lane routes with concrete shoulders, drainage and concrete bridges. The journey from the Lao border town of Huai Xai to the southwestern Chinese border village of Mohan situated in southwestern Yunnan province took as long as two days on the old mostly dirt road depending on weather conditions. The new roadway has shortened that trip to five to six hours.

The route was expected to be completed in 2007, but damage to the road from floods during the 2006 rainy season pushed the completion date into 2008. While the road was now made passable all year, there are still sections, some of several kilometers in length, which remained unfinished as of 2008.

=== Missing link in Southeast Asia ===
Construction of the Thai-built portion of the road lagged behind that of the Chinese section, but some observers contend that was because the Thai section was "much better constructed". They indicated that the Chinese side was built faster because of engineering shortcuts which may make that section of the road less durable.

The most significant problem with the corridor was the lack of progress on the Fourth Thai-Lao Friendship Bridge to be built across the Mekong River connecting the Thai town of Chiang Khong, with its cross-border neighbour of Ban Houayxay in Laos. The Chinese and Thai governments earlier agreed to build the bridge and share the estimated US$33 million cost of the project. It was finally opened on December 11, 2013.

Thai border disputes with Laos, the 1997-98 Asian financial crisis, political indifference in Bangkok and a general reluctance on the part of Thais kept the project on the political 'back burner'. China meanwhile is anxious to develop its land-locked Yunnan province through the creation of trade links with Southeast Asia, including access to Thailand's sea ports. While Thailand may benefit broadly from a new road link with China, others feared a flood of inexpensive Chinese products will impoverish northern Thais.

Some of those fears came to pass with the early implementation of some provisions with the Chinese-Thai free trade agreement, which resulted in a flood of inexpensive Chinese agricultural products. As of 2008, the last incomplete link to Laos represented a significant barrier to efficient trade between the two countries and some commented that was the reason for Thai procrastination on the bridge's completion. Bangkok might also have been using the bridge as a bargaining chip for trade negotiations with Beijing, since the Chinese appeared to increasingly value the route's completion.

Until the bridge's completion in December 2013, the portion of the AH-3 North-South Corridor remained both incomplete and inefficient. As of 2008, Chinese goods destined for Thailand had to be ferried across the Mekong River between Chiang Khong and Huay Xai and many shippers have expressed their concerns that the ferry costs and Lao customs duties were too expensive, and traders also complained about the lengthy time required for Lao customs procedures and inspections. The bridge opened to the public on December 11, 2013.

Although Laos was pressured to eliminate transit taxes, the cash-short government remained hesitant, in part because China and Thailand were seen to benefit disproportionately from the completed roadway. Currently almost all China-Thailand trade is conducted by shipping up and down the Mekong River, with goods taking from 10 to 15 days to reach their destination.

As of 2008, the water route was suffering from frequent problems of inadequate levels to keep large cargo barges afloat, a situation which is likely to occur more frequently when more of China's planned dams on the river's upper reaches become functional in the future. The economic benefits of the roadway to Laos, meanwhile, are still undetermined.

=== Southeast Asian development issues ===
While the AH-3 highway was expected to increase business and trade through increased market access to both China and Thailand, including the country's agribusiness and tourism sectors, the Lao government appeared more open to increasing state revenues through the collection of transit fees and taxes on goods that arrived at its borders. It was also under pressure from the Association of Southeast Asian Nations to embed new costs into the already low intra-regional trade.

According to people involved in the tourism industry in northwestern Laos, while Western tourists were arriving in increasing numbers, tourists from neighbouring Thailand and China often only pass through Laos on their way to Boten on the Chinese border, where there is a large casino and a market.

In addition to reaping less economic benefits, Laos will also likely have to deal with disproportionate social and environmental costs, people monitoring the project say. Without proper control mechanisms in place, the region's opening would disproportionately benefit government-connected business groups while displacing large numbers of the non-ethnic Lao groups currently living in the area.

A 2002 ADB report estimated that approximately 2,500 people (500 households) might have to be relocated due to the road project; some monitoring groups put the real number much higher. Although resettlement plans were drafted by the ADB to compensate for the loss of houses, land, rice granaries and shops, it was not clear that the funds were truly reaching the people most affected.

Among the issues involved was the resettlement of the original Lao inhabitants of Boten village near the Chinese border, who were moved a kilometer or more down the road to allow the construction of a new Chinese-owned casino, hotel and other commercial developments. The resettled Botens complained that their new site lacked services, and that the land set aside for them was smaller and less fertile than their original land. As well, others complained about rampant land grabs adjacent to the new road by government-connected traders and businessmen who established shops and other businesses on the new prime real estate. A lack of formal land deeds or proper court systems meant there was little justice available to the displaced residents.

The legal vacuum also allowed an increasing flow of Chinese migrants, many of whom first arrived to work on the road and who then stayed on to establish businesses along the road, including whole new villages, which further aggravated those previously resettled to less fertile land.

Rights groups were also concerned with the remote area's rapid development resulting in increases to exposure of HIV/AIDS, human trafficking and the possible exploitation of the surrounding forests and wildlife resources.

While the ADB's original hopes that the route would reduce transportation costs for the movement of vehicles, goods and people, and also promote faster economic growth, as the 7,300 km (4,500 mi) North-South Corridor neared completion in 2008 the real costs and benefits of the project for the local populations of Southeast Asia were still in doubt.

== Associated routes ==
=== Russia ===
- A 340: Ulan-Ude – Kyakhta – border with Mongolia (235 km)

=== Mongolia ===
- A0403 : Altanbulag - Sükhbaatar
- A0402 : Sükhbaatar - Darkhan
- A0401 : Darkhan - Ulaanbaatar ( AH32 )
- A0501 : Ulaanbaatar - Nalaikh ( AH32 )
- A0101 : Nalaikh - Choir
- A0102 : Choir - Sainshand
- A0103 : Sainshand - Zamyn-Üüd

=== China ===
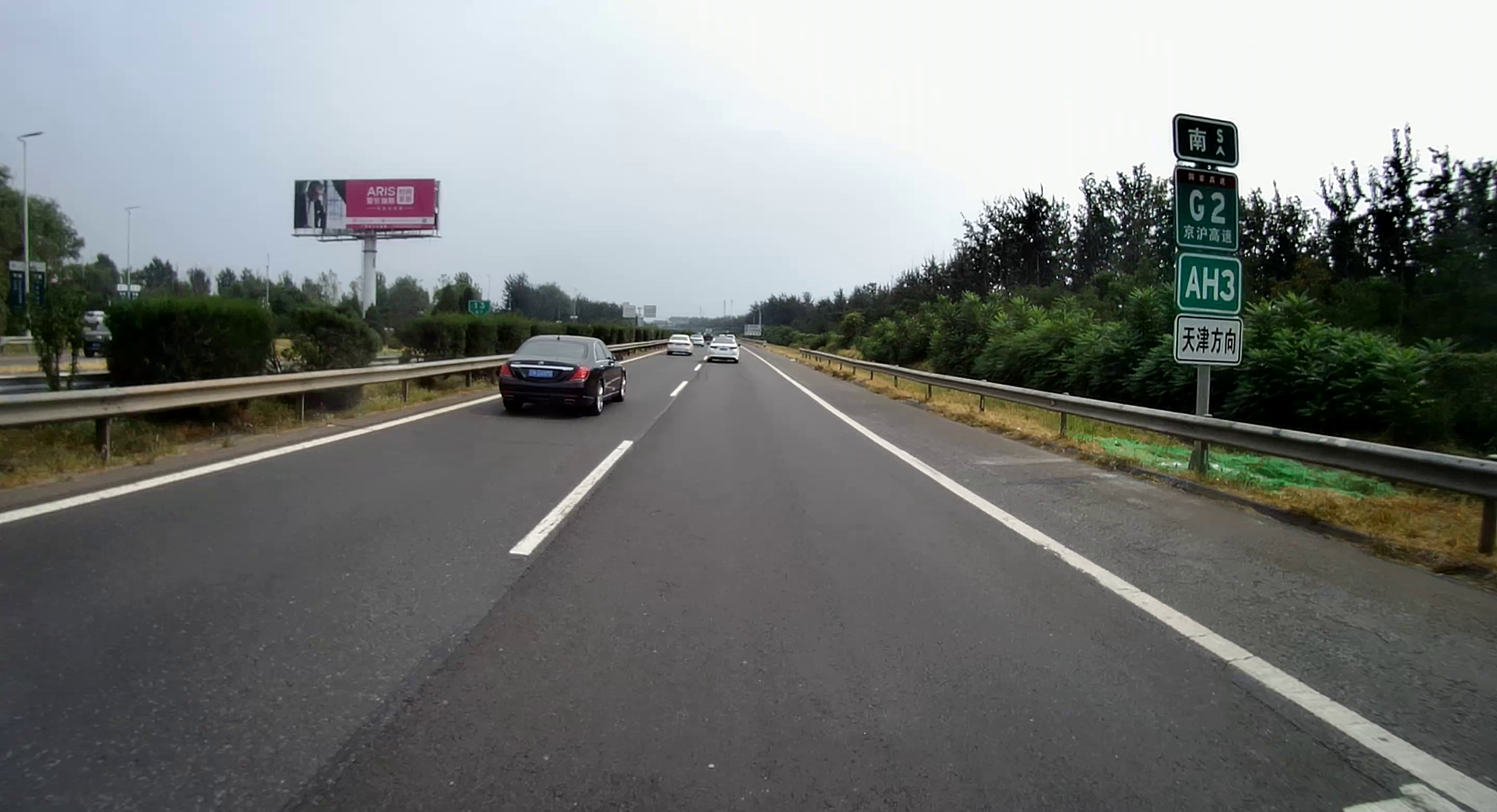
Sign of G2 and AH3

- G55: Erenhot – Ulanqab
- G6: Ulanqab – Zhangjiakou – Beijing
- G2: Beijing – Tianjin
- G0212 (formerly S40): Tianjin – Tanggu
- G60: Shanghai – Hangzhou – Nanchang – Xiangtan – Guiyang – Kunming
- G8511: Kunming – Jinghong – Mohan
  - G8512: Jinghong – Daluo

=== Laos ===
- ທ. 13 Route 13: Boten – Nateuy (20 km)
- ທ. 3 Route 3: Nateuy – Luang Namtha – Ban Houayxay (242 km)
- Fourth Thai-Lao Friendship Bridge (0,48 km)

=== Thailand ===
- Thailand Route 1152: Fourth Thai-Lao Friendship Bridge – Chiang Khong (5.2 km)
- Thailand Route 1020: Chiang Khong – Chiang Rai (113 km) (ending at AH2)

=== Myanmar ===
- Mong La – Keng Tung (alternative route) (AH2)

== See also ==
- Kunming-Bangkok Expressway
- Fourth Thai-Lao Friendship Bridge
