= Muang Kham, Laos =

Muang Kham
- Town
- Location within Laos
- Coordinates: 19°37′52″N 103°33′39″E
- Country: Laos
- Province: Xiangkhouang
- Time zone: UTC+7 (Laos Standard Time)
- Climate: Cwa

Muang Kham is a small town in Xiangkhouang Province in northeastern Laos. It is located along Route 7 (Laos), 55.7 kilometres (34.6 mi) east of Phonsavan, on the way to Nong Haet. The road between Muang Kham and Nong Haet is noted for its Tai Dam funerary shrines with white tombs, prayer flags and offerings.

== Healthcare ==
The Kham District Hospital is located in Muang Kham.

== Climate ==
Climate data for Muang Kham, elevation 587 m (1,926 ft), (1990–2019)
Month	Jan	Feb	Mar	Apr	May	Jun	Jul	Aug	Sep	Oct	Nov	Dec	Year
Mean daily maximum °C (°F)	24.5 (76.1)	27.8 (82.0)	30.7 (87.3)	32.1 (89.8)	31.7 (89.1)	31.6 (88.9)	30.8 (87.4)	30.5 (86.9)	30.3 (86.5)	28.7 (83.7)	27.1 (80.8)	23.9 (75.0)	29.1 (84.5)
Mean daily minimum °C (°F)	11.5 (52.7)	13.0 (55.4)	16.3 (61.3)	19.7 (67.5)	21.7 (71.1)	22.9 (73.2)	22.7 (72.9)	22.5 (72.5)	21.5 (70.7)	19.2 (66.6)	15.3 (59.5)	12.1 (53.8)	18.2 (64.8)
Average precipitation mm (inches)	19 (0.7)	13 (0.5)	56 (2.2)	112 (4.4)	170 (6.7)	165 (6.5)	259 (10.2)	265 (10.4)	131 (5.2)	47 (1.9)	32 (1.3)	14 (0.6)	1,283 (50.6)
Source: Food and Agriculture Organization of the United Nations
