= A340 highway (Russia) =

Road in Russia

Federal Highway A340
- Федеральная автомобильная дорога А340

Route information
- Part of AH3
- Length: 219 km (136 mi)
- Existed: 2010–present

Major junctions
- North end: R 258 in Ulan-Ude
- South end: Mongolian border in Khyagt

Location
- Country: Russia

Highway system
- Russian Federal Highways

The Russian route A340 is a Russian federal highway, connecting Russian city Ulan-Ude and Mongolia.

Until 2010, the highway was designated as A165. The entire route is part of AH3, a route of the Asian Highway Network.

== Gallery ==
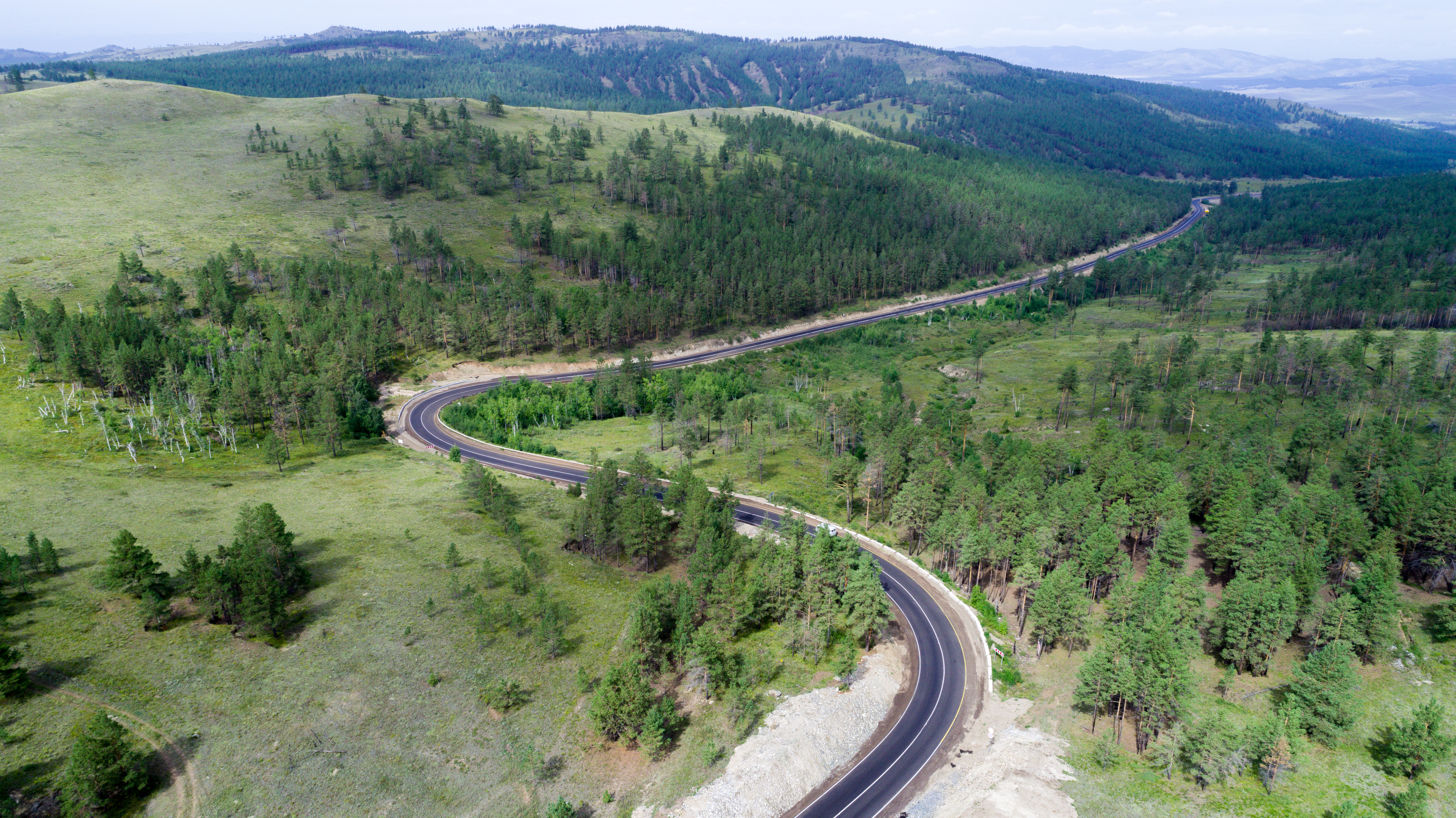

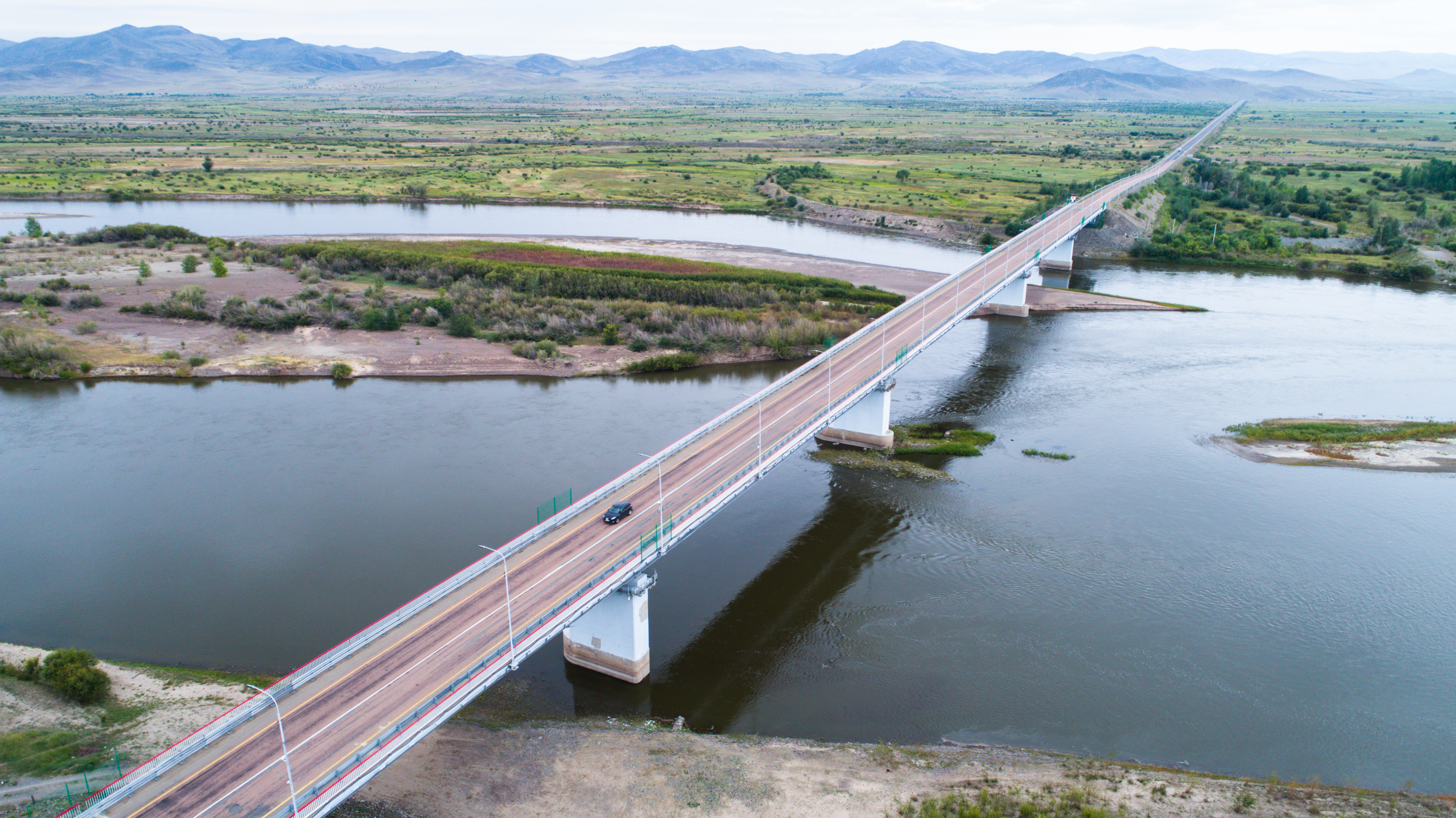
