= Faydang Lobliayao =

Hmong leading politician

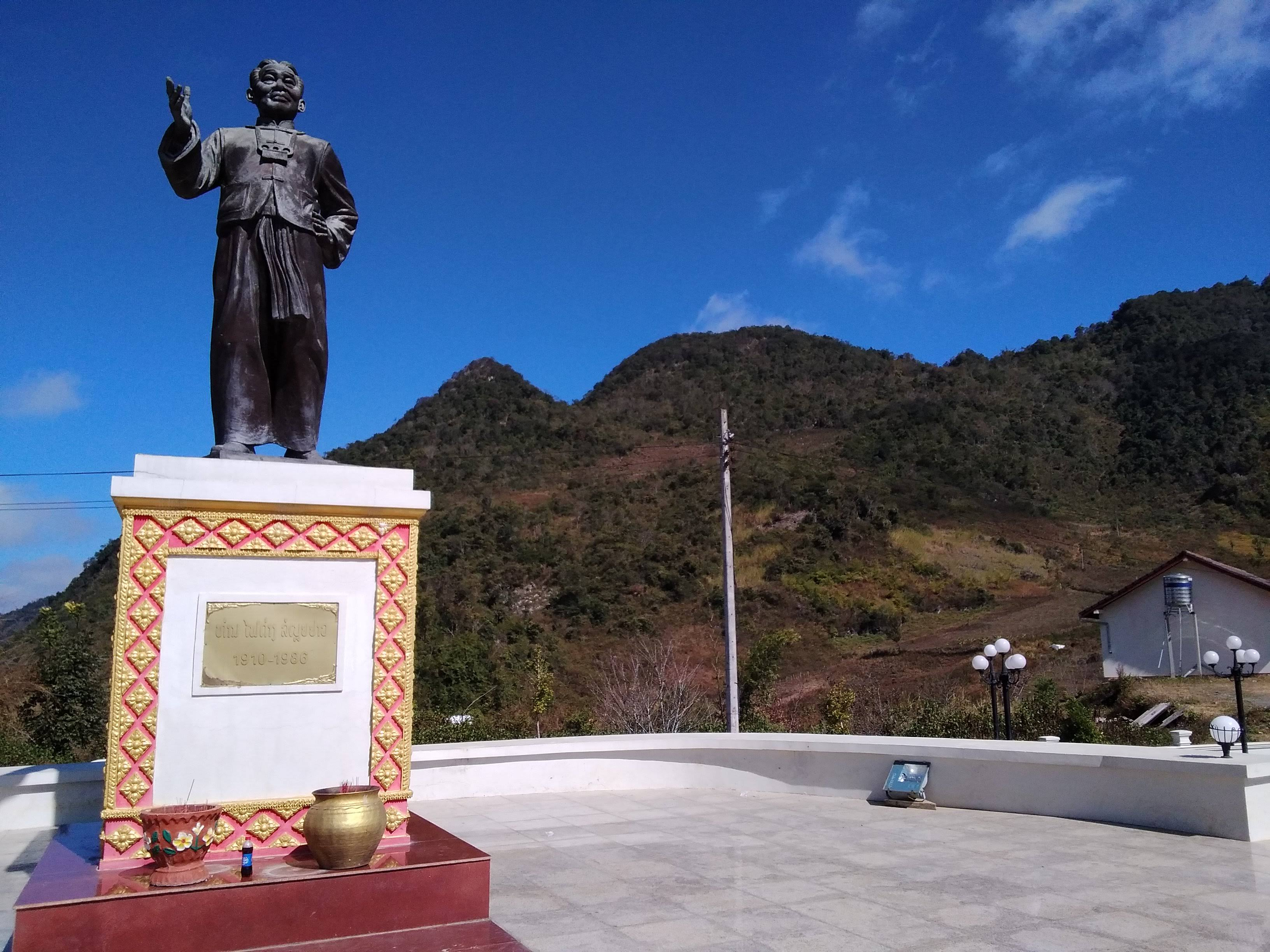
Faydang Lo Bliayao 1910 - 1986, a Hmong Warrior leader during the Vietnam War 1960 - 1975.

Faydang Lobliayao (RPA: Faiv Ntaj Lauj Npliaj Yob, Pahawh: 𖬊𖬲𖬜𖬵 𖬖𖬰𖬩𖬵 𖬄𖬶𖬞 𖬔𖬶𖬨𖬵 𖬒𖬰𖬤; the family name in traditional Hmong is Lo, 1910 – 12 July 1986) was a Hmong leading politician in Laos during the anti-French Colonial Regime war in the period of 1947-1954 and the American Secret War in Indochina in the period of 1955-1975.

Faydang was the son of Kiatong Lo Bliayao (RPA: Kiabtoom Lauj Npliaj Yob).(This is not a true statement, The Tasseng position was transferred to Faydang's own brother Chong Tou Lo, who was a brother-in-law of Touby Ly Foung. Later, Ly Foung wanted the Taseng position for himself but Faydang disagreed and wanted the position divide into 2 Tasseng for the 2 brothers. Ly Foung disagreed and engaged military against Faydang and Nyiaj Vue Lo). He felt that the leadership position of Tasseng (RPA: Tojxeem) should be passed from his father to him; but instead it was passed to Ly Foung. He petitioned the colonial French government for the position but was denied. He and his fellow clansmen aided the Japanese in their occupation of Indochina for a short period of time between 1944-1945. As late as 1947, he made contact with the Lao Issara, most notably Prince Souphanouvong. He served as Vice President of the Lao Front for National Construction and Vice President of the Supreme People's Assembly.

His younger brother was Nyiaveu Lobliayao, also a member of the Lao People's Revolutionary Party. Faydang was never a party member. He was recognised as one of the four national heroes of Laos and received a full state funeral. His direct relative (Madam Pany Lobliayao) is currently the vice-president.
