= Route 13 (Laos) =

Highway in Laos

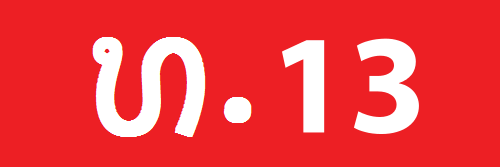
Route 13

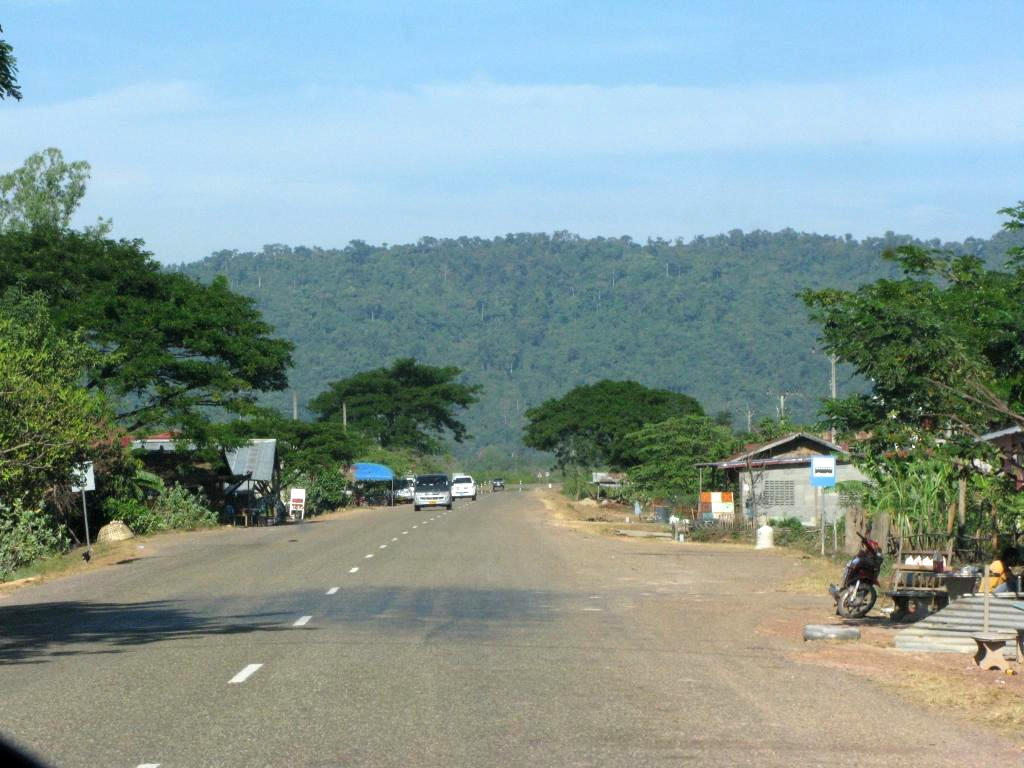
- Route 13 South, Laos

Route information
- Part of AH3 AH11 AH12 AH15
- Maintained by Government of Laos
- Length: 1,426 km (886 mi)

Major junctions
- North end: Chinese border near Luang Namtha (China) G213 Road; G8511 Kunmo Expressway
- South end: Cambodian border near Muang Khong (Cambodia) Highway 7

Location
- Country: Laos
- Major cities: Pakse, Luang Prabang
- Towns: Muang Khong

Highway system
- Transport in Laos

Route 13 is the most important highway in Laos. It begins at Boten in northern Laos at the Chinese border. It connects the city of Vientiane to Luang Prabang in the north and roughly follows the line of the Mekong River down to the border with Cambodia. The road then continues at National Highway 7 in Cambodia. Route 13 passes the New Laos National Stadium at Vientiane prefecture and all three international airports in Laos: Vientiane Airport, Luang Prabang Airport, and Pakse Airport. Between Boten and Nateuy a 20 km segment of Route 13 is part of the Kunming-Bangkok Expressway, (Asian Highway AH3). From Nateuy to Vientiane, Route 13 is part of AH12 and from Vientiane to the border of Cambodia, AH11. It roughly runs parallel to Vientiane-Boten Expressway.

Route 13 passes through the cities of Vientiane, Vang Vieng, Phoukhoune district where is intersection of Route 7 (Laos), and Luang Prabang. The road is mostly paved, though the pavement is in poor condition at places, it is relatively narrow with sharp curves and there are no markings or lighting on the road everywhere. Several daily buses run from Vientiane to Luang Prabang, the journey taking 8–10 hours.

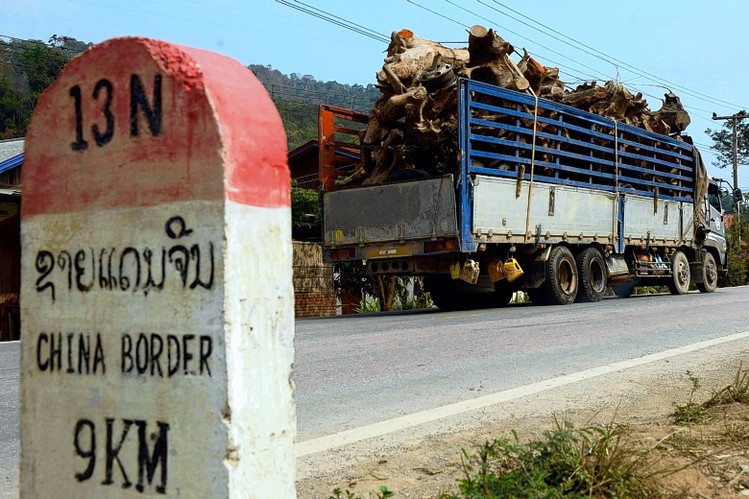
N13 Milestone 9 km (5.6 mi) from Chinese border at Boten

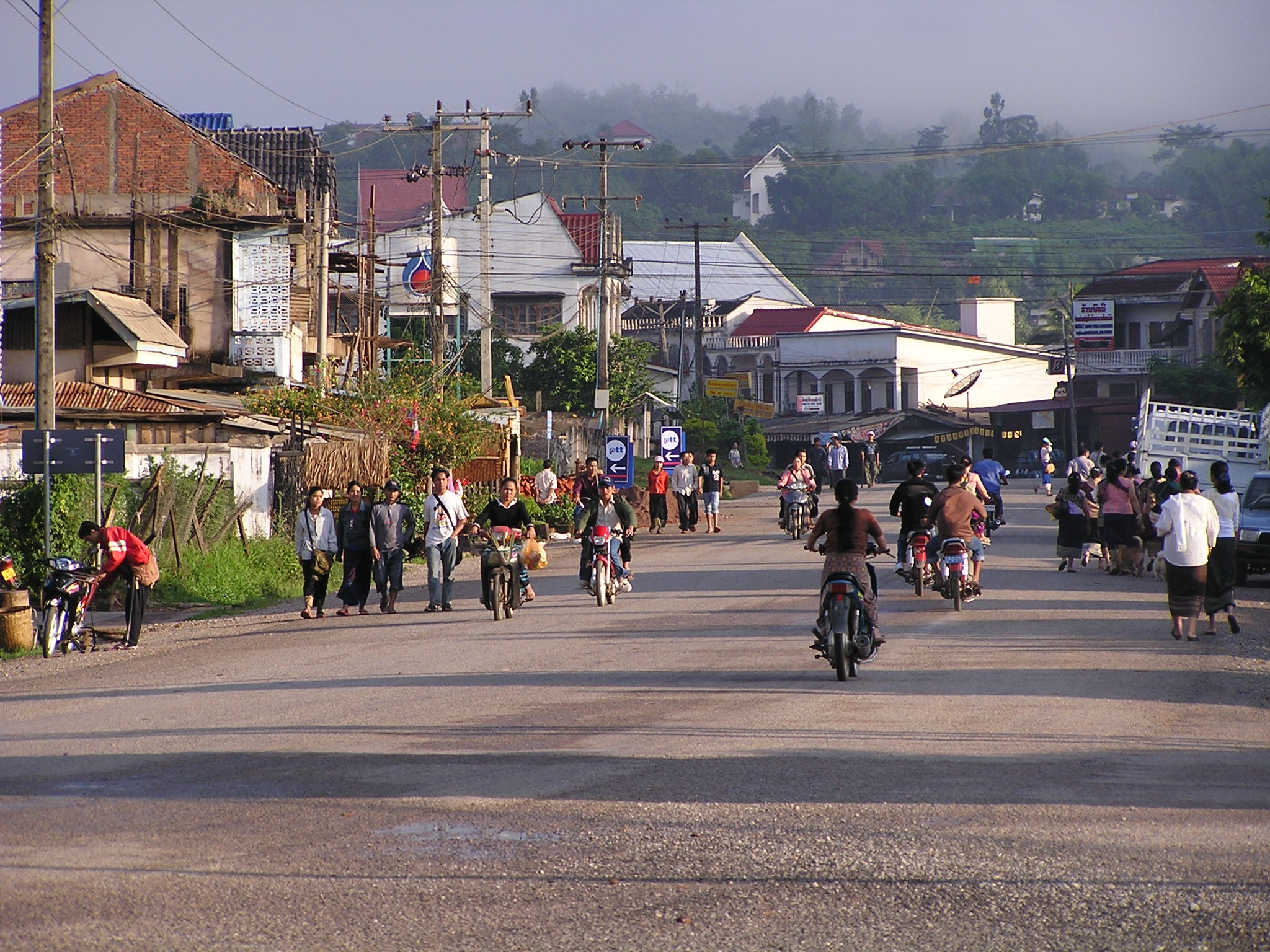
Laos Route N13 at Muang Xay

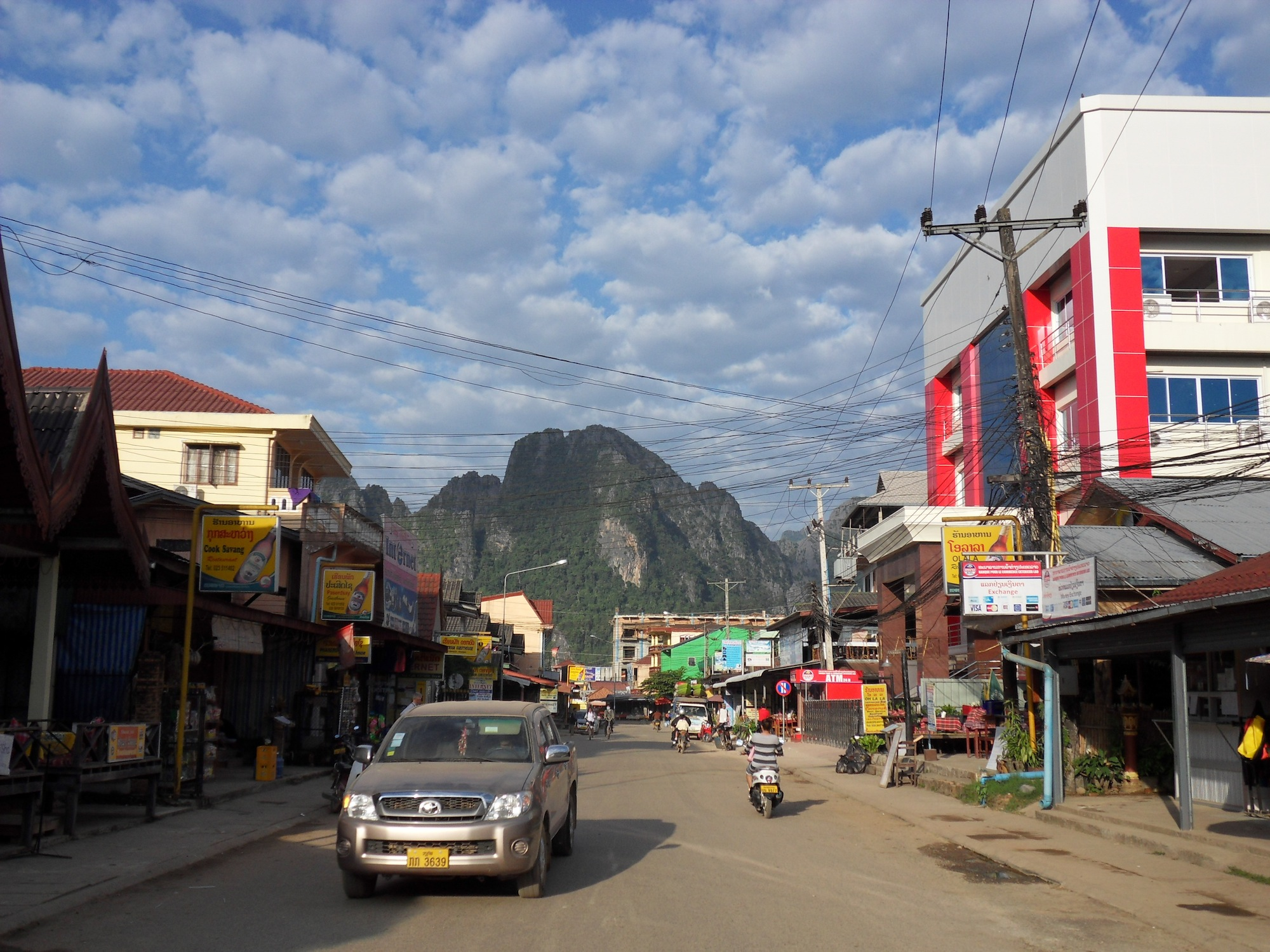
Laos Route N13 at Vang Vieng

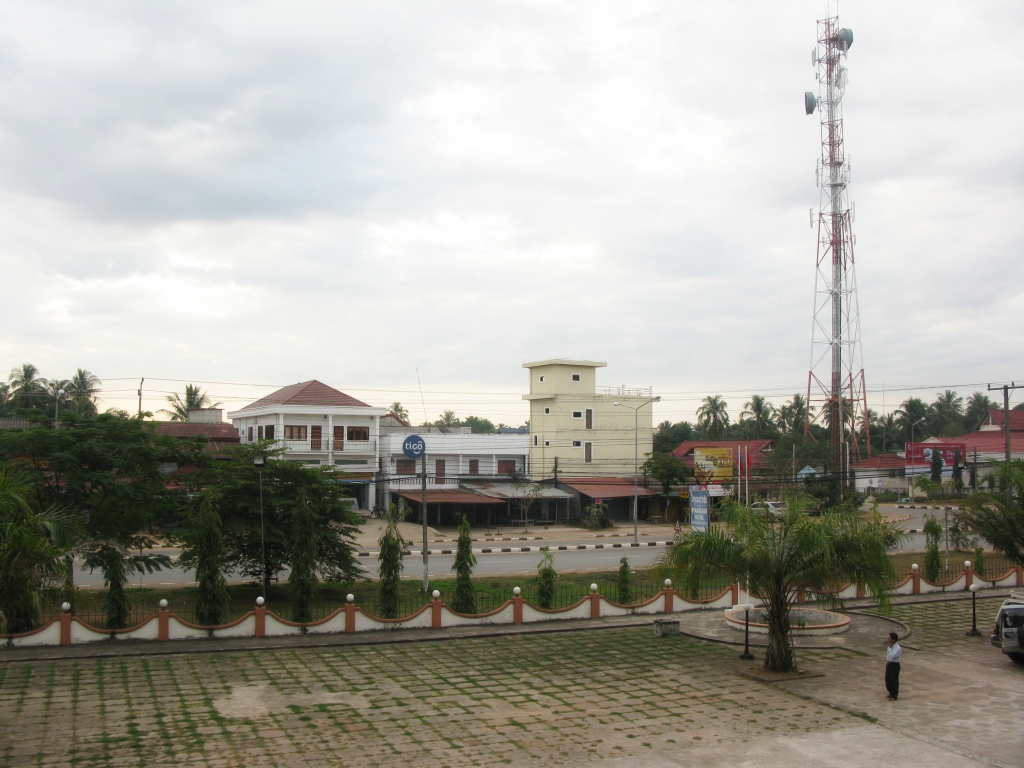
Laos Route N13 at Pakxan

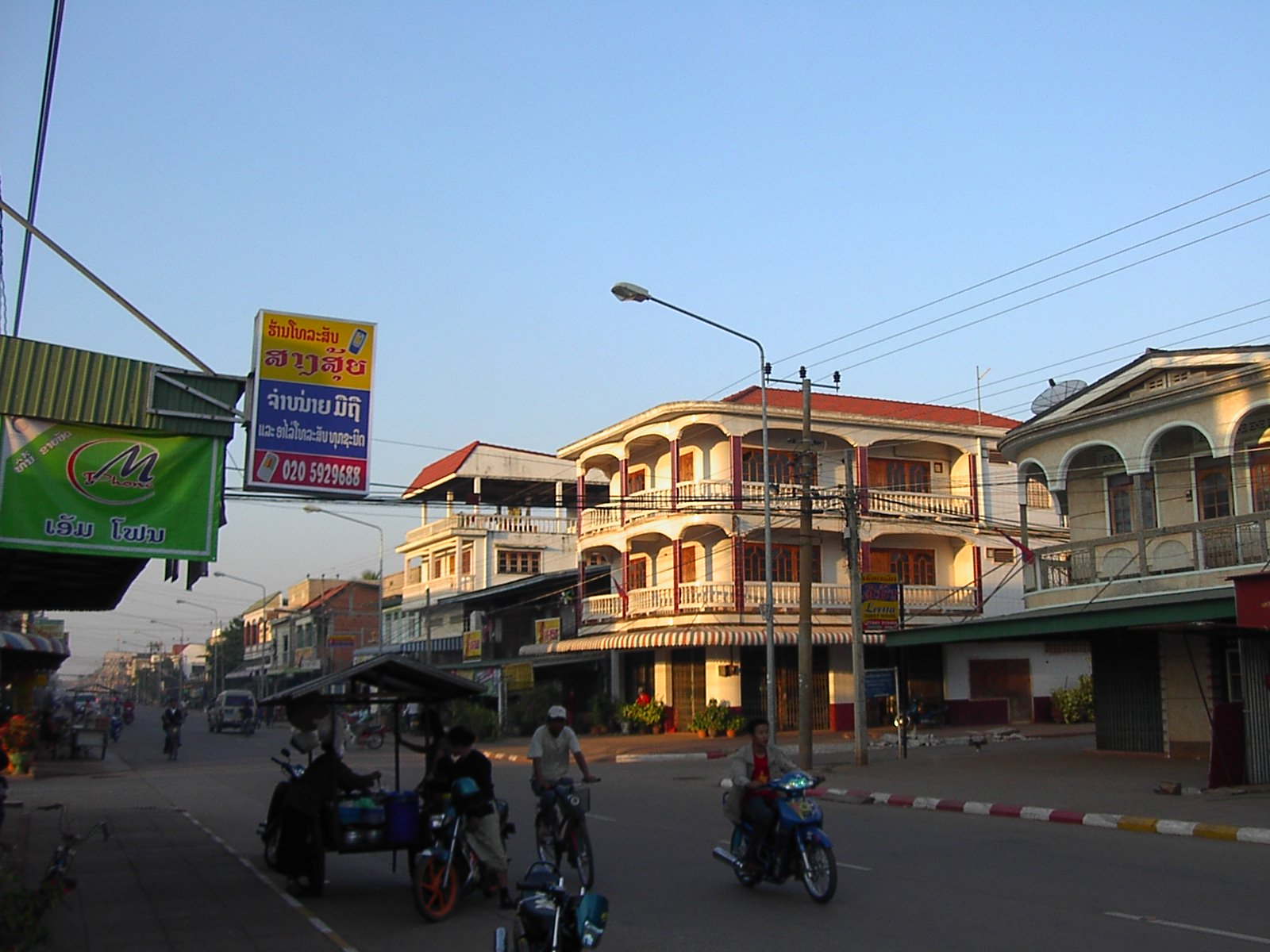
Laos Route N13 at Savannakhet
