= Nong Het =

- Town
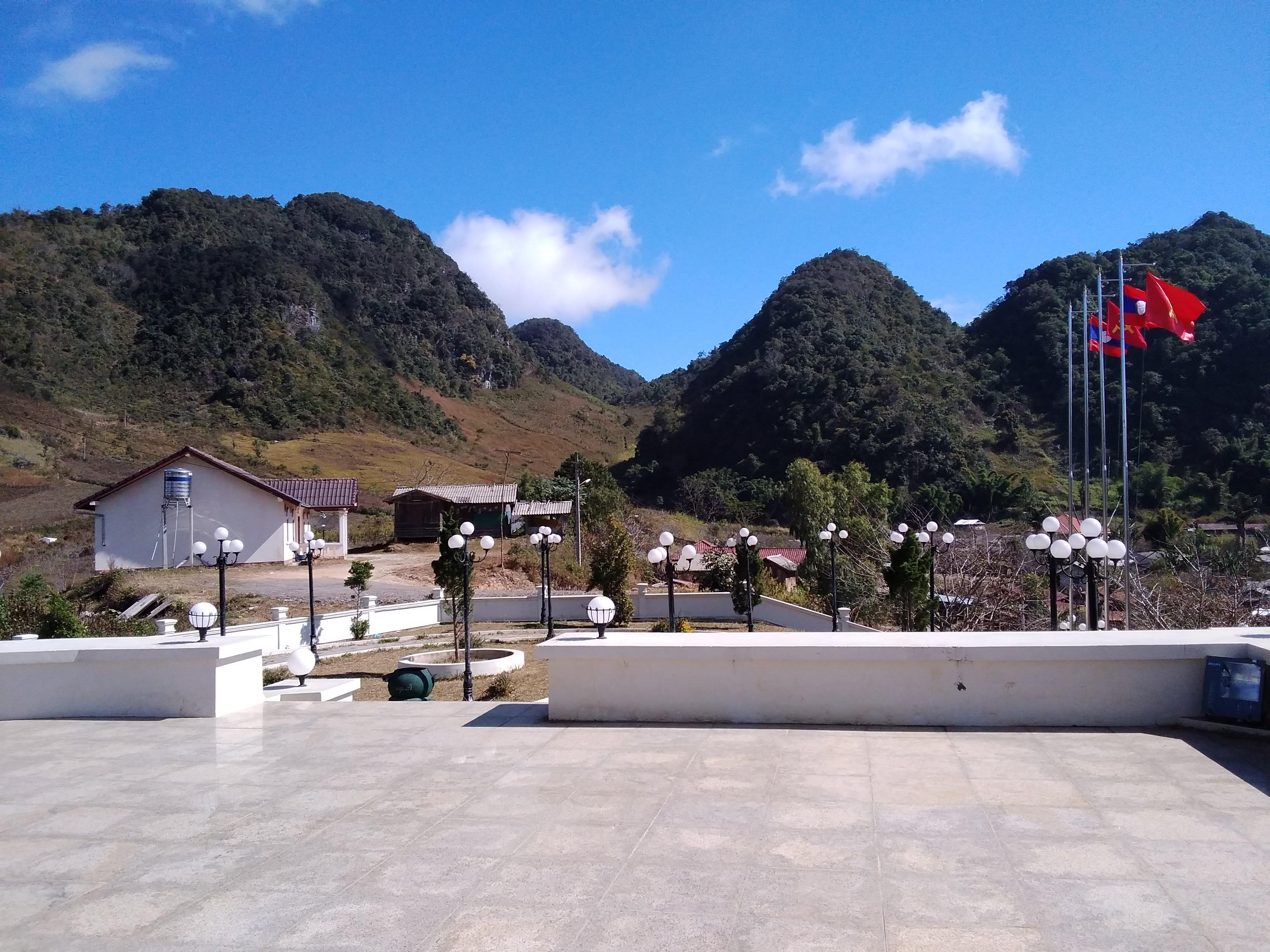

- Location within Laos
- Coordinates: 19°29′44″N 103°59′13″E
- Country: Laos
- Province: Xiangkhouang
- District: Nong Het
- Time zone: UTC+07:00 (Laos Standard Time)
- Climate: Cwb

Nong Het, also Nong Haet, Nonghet, Muang Nonghet or Nonghed, is a market town in Xiangkhouang Province in northeastern Laos, located about 13 kilometres (8.1 mi) from the border with Vietnam. It is the principal town of Nong Het District. It is located along Route 7, 119 kilometres (74 mi) east of Phonsavan, along the road which passes through Muang Kham and Ban Na Sala on the way to Nong Haet. Bus companies operating in the area have increased to cater for tourists. The population is primarily Hmong peoples.

== History ==
Nong Het has a turbulent history of battles between the Ly and Moua warriors, Red Laotians and the Hmong. The Red Laotians once invaded, tying up local leaders and robbing the wealthy of the town. Historically, two Hmong families have shared power in Nong Het, the Lo clan and the Ly clan. In 1917, the French appointed Lo Bliayao of the Lo clan as chief of Non Het.

The strategical position of Nong Het meant that it was an "important resupply and transshipment point" during the Indochinese and Vietnam War, and contained "approximately a dozen NVA warehouses". French colonial leader Doussineau was based at Nong Het during the Japanese invasion. Faydang, son of Lo Bliayao, moved his base from Xiengkhouang to Nong Het in 1961. The Vietnamese built a 10 kilometres (6.2 mi)-long road from Muong Xen to Nong Het to ease the transportation of Communist units to the Hmong base camp. The town also produced some notable Hmong leaders including Touby Lyfoung and General Vang Pao. Opium production is not uncommon in Nong Het district.

== Vàng kham nong het ==
- Global Community Nonghet - ChildFund Australia Supporting 12 villages in Nonghet district
