= Touby Lyfoung =

Politician and Military Leader

- 𖬆𖬰𖬧𖬵 𖬃𖬰𖬨𖬵 𖬃𖬰𖬞 𖬌𖬰𖬜𖬵
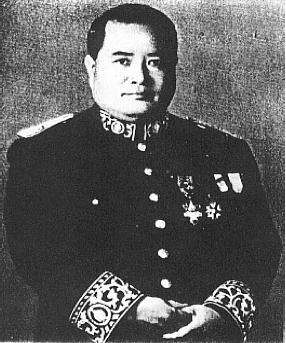
- Tub Npis Lis Foom in his old age
- Pronunciation: [tú ᵐbì lì fɔ̰̃]
- Born: 1919 in Nong Het, Laos, French Indochina
- Died: April 1979; Prison Camp Number One in Houaphan Province
- Education: Graduated from a French high school in Vinh, North Vietnam
- Known for: Being the first Hmong politician in the Royal Lao Government

Touby Lyfoung (RPA: Tub Npis Lis Foom [tú ᵐbì lì fɔ̰̃], Pahawh: 𖬆𖬰𖬧𖬵 𖬃𖬰𖬨𖬵 𖬃𖬰𖬞 𖬌𖬰𖬜𖬵 [tú ᵐbì lì fɔ̰̃]: 1919–1979) was a Hmong political and military leader. Born in 1919 in Nong Het, Laos, he became the first Hmong politician to achieve national prominence. During his long career, which began under French colonial rule and extended to the communist takeover in 1975, he supported the Royal Lao Government (RLG) and American involvement in the Secret War.

== Under French Rule ==
Touby Lyfoung was the son of Ly Xia Foung, a very well respected man among the Hmong community of Laos, and the grandson-in-law of Lo Bliayao, one of the first Hmong to gain leadership position in the Laotian government. Coming from a rich and well known family, Touby was able to attend schools in the lowlands of Laos and sent to study in Vietnam as well. Touby studied at the French Lycée, School of Law, and the Administration in Vientiane. The French were impressed by his education, for he was the only Hmong to have attained such an education in the French colonial empire.

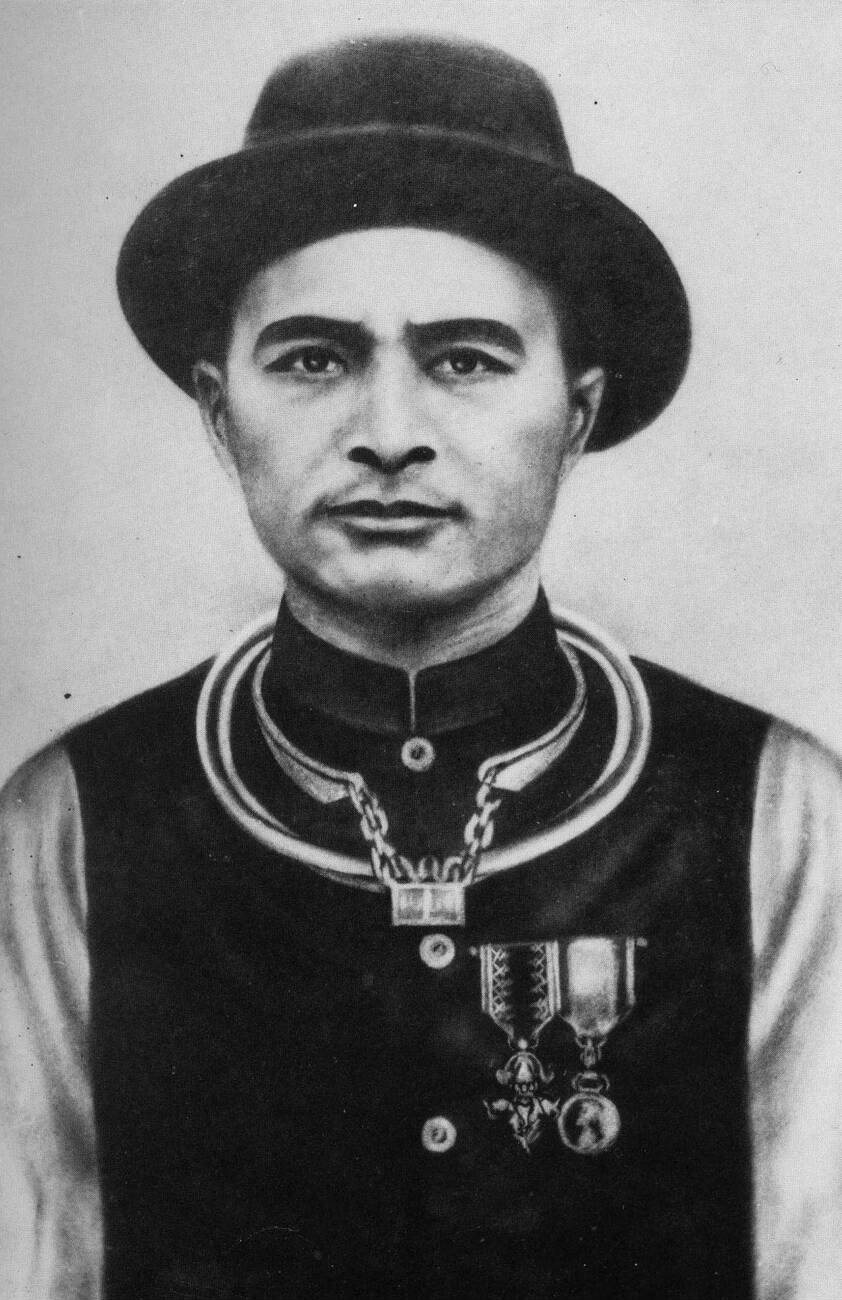
Ly Xia Foung, father of Touby Lyfoung, in 1936

Being one of the few Hmong people educated in the French colonial school system, Touby Lyfoung was elected as head (tasseng) of the Nong Het sub-district in Xiangkhoang Province in 1939. The next year, as the only Hmong member of the Opium Purchasing Board, he oversaw the institution of a new tax that was payable in opium for those farmers who were too poor to pay in cash. At the time, many Hmong, like other ethnic minorities in the region, cultivated poppies and sold the extracted opium as a cash crop. The French colonial authorities relied on taxes from the opium trade to fund infrastructure projects and draw revenue from the colonies. Cut-off from their most abundant supply of opium in Afghanistan (due to conflicts associated with World War II), the French looked with favor upon Lyfoung for helping to improve the output of Laos.

When the Japanese occupied Laos in March 1945, Lyfoung was arrested for his associations with the French. He escaped and moved to the mountains where he helped to lead guerrilla attacks against the occupiers with a Hmong militia that included the young future general, Vang Pao.

== After World War II ==
Following, World War II, the French colonialists appointed Lyfoung district head (chaomuong), giving Hmong people direct representation at the national level for the first time. The move helped to widen the growing gap between Lyfoung and Faydang Lobliayao, another Hmong leader who had been promised the earlier tasseng position by the French. Lobliayao went on to join the communist/nationalist struggle against the French rulers (with the Pathet lao) and later the Royal Lao Government. Lyfoung remained loyal to the RLG and led forces against the Pathet Lao and North Vietnamese between 1946 and 1954, helping to force them out of Xiangkhoang province.

In the 1950s, Lyfoung's role was critical in shaping the newly independent Kingdom of Laos as a nation acknowledging the diversity of its 63 ethnic minorities while being united as one country. Touby Lyfoung was the first Hmong and ethnic minority person to be honored by the King of Laos, when he was appointed Minister to the King, with the title of Phagna Touby Lyfoung. In the 60's and 70's, Lyfoung continued his lifelong fight for the Hmong people's dignity and freedom in Laos, he took sides with the Royal Lao Government to fight the Communists in Laos and led a Hmong anti-Communist movement against the Pathet Lao

== Death of Touby Lyfoung ==
After the takeover of Laos by the communist Pathet Lao in 1975, Lyfoung decided not to flee the country despite the threat of retribution for supporting the RLG. Under the new government, he was appointed deputy Minister of Telecommunications but later arrested and sent to Prison Camp Number One in Houaphan Province on the Vietnamese border. This was the same camp where members of the royal family, including King Savang Vatthana, were kept prior to their death. According to another inmate of the camp, Colonel Khamphan Thammakhanty, Touby was kept shackled during the final months of his life but other inmates could hear him singing songs that mocked the new government. It is reported that Touby Lyfoung was shot by a guard in April 1979 and buried locally.
