= Vientiane–Boten Expressway =

Road in Laos

- Lao-China Expressway ທາງດ່ວນ ລາວ-ຈີນ
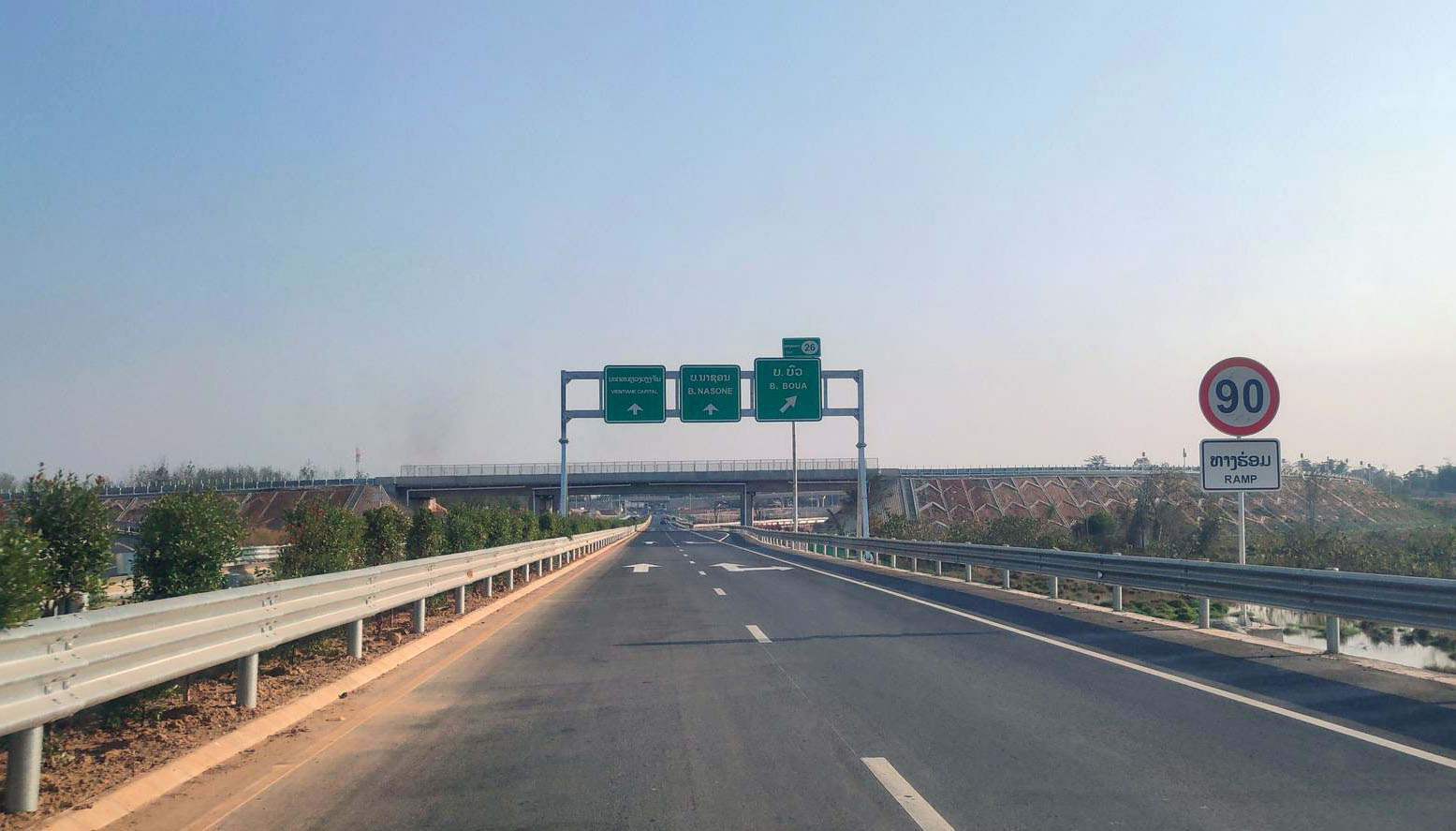
- Near Boua, Naxaithong District

Route information
- Length: 440 km (270 mi)

Major junctions
- From: Sikeut, Naxaithong, Vientiane Prefecture
- G8511 Kunming–Mohan Expressway
- To: Boten

Vientiane–Vang Vieng Expressway
- Length: 109 km (68 mi)
- From: Vientiane
- To: Vang Vieng

Location
- Country: Laos

Highway system
- Transport in Laos

The Vientiane–Boten Expressway (officially referred to as the Lao-China Expressway) (Lao: ທາງດ່ວນ ລາວ-ຈີນ) is a partially completed expressway between Boten, on the China–Laos border, and Vientiane, the capital of Laos. It roughly parallels Route 13.

The expressway is the first in Laos.

Construction of the expressway is divided in four sections:

- Vientiane–Vang Vieng (109 km (68 mi))
- Vang Vieng–Luang Prabang (137 km (85 mi))
- Luang Prabang–Oudomxay
- Oudomxay–Boten

The first section to be completed is the Vientiane–Vang Vieng Expressway; in June 2020, it was 71% complete and, in December 2020, it was inaugurated. Preparation work for the Vang Vieng–Luang Prabang section was to commence after opening of the Vientiane–Vang Vieng section.

The Vientiane-Boten Expressway, linking Vientiane to Boten in Luang Namtha Province, is expected to be completed by 2030.

== Vientiane–Vang Vieng Expressway ==
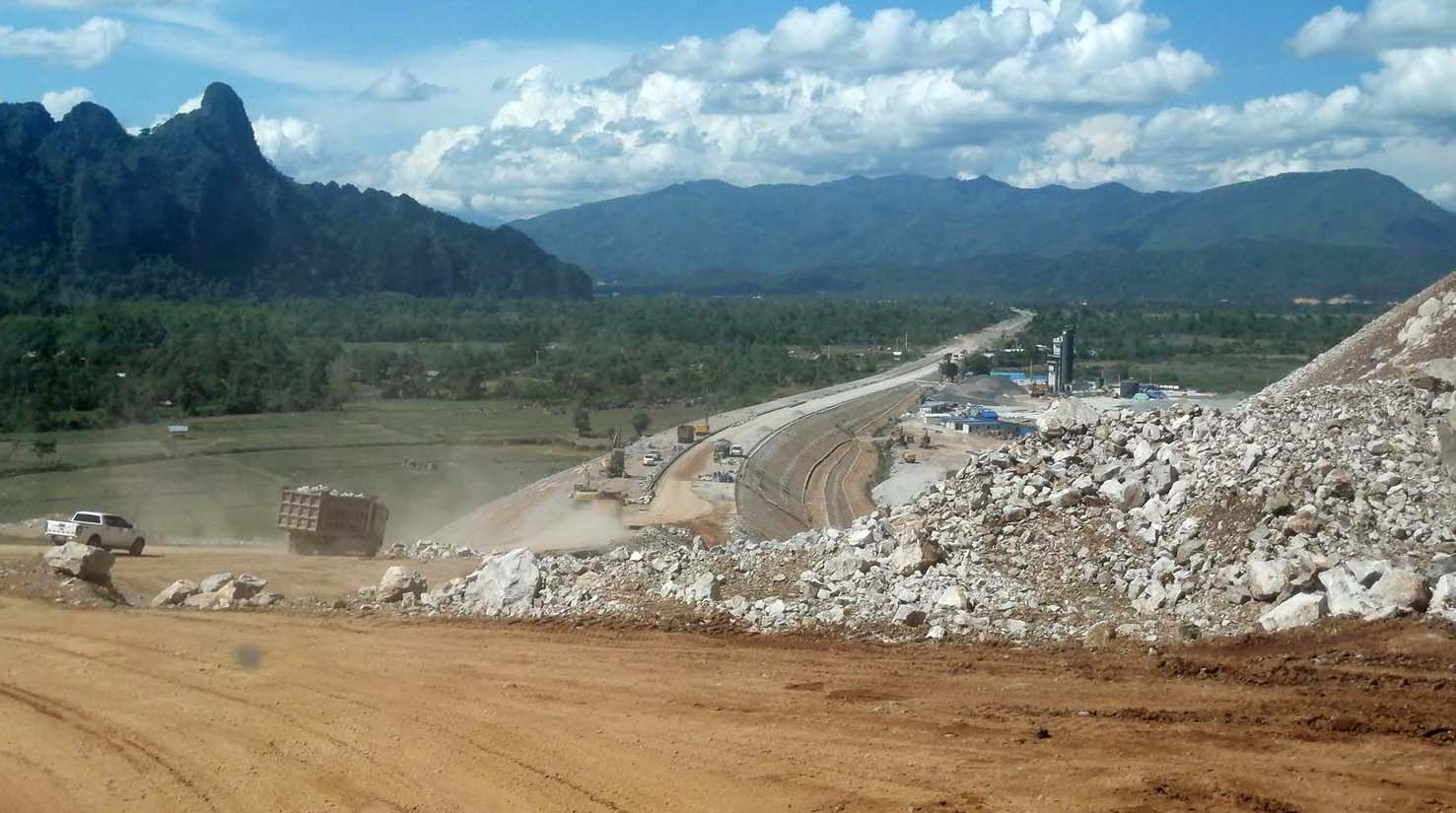
Under construction in May 2020

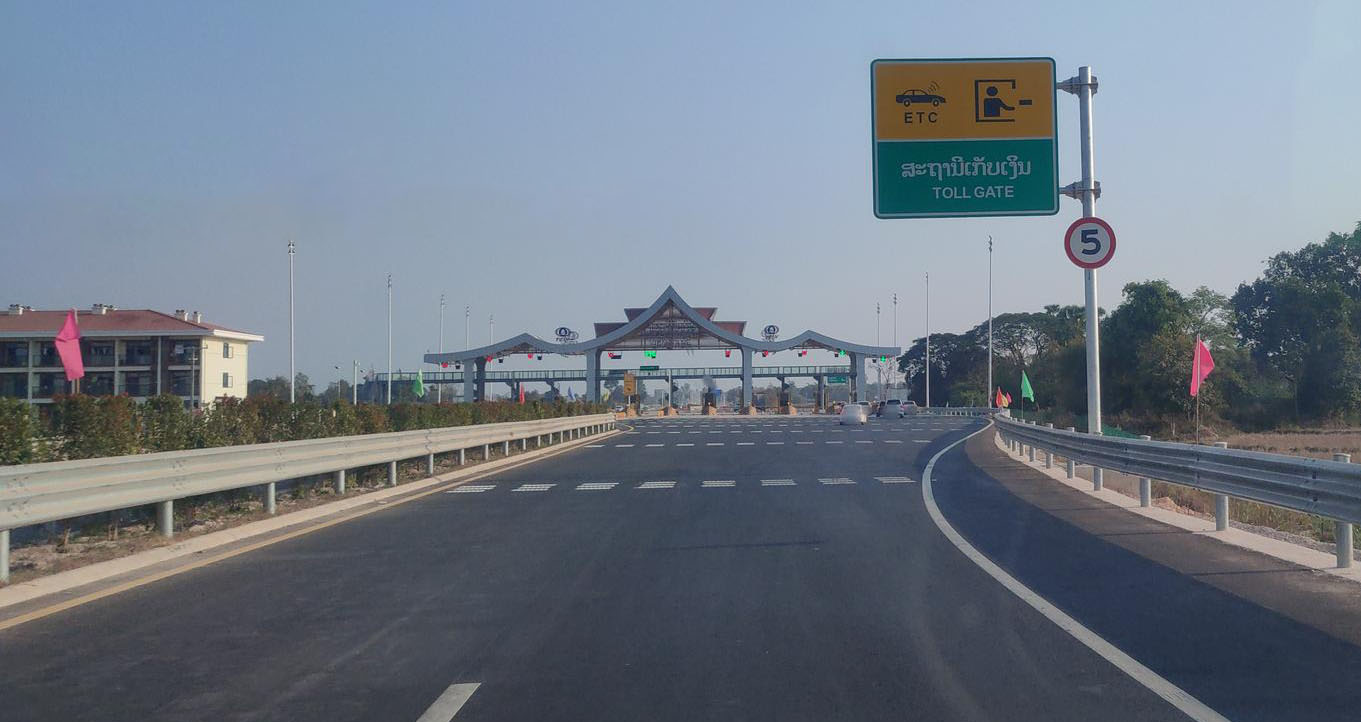
Vientiane toll station, the terminus of the expressway

Construction of the first section began at the end of 2018 and was initially scheduled to finish in 2021, but was already completed on 20 December 2020. The road shortens the trip by 43 km compared with the existing Route 13. The expressway toll will be 550 kip per kilometre, or about 62,000 kip for a one-way trip between Vientiane and Vang Vieng.

The trip from Vientiane to Vang Vieng is shortened from 4 hours to 1.5 hours using the expressway. Speeds on the expressway are designated at 120 km per hour on flat terrain from Sikeut village to in Vientiane Prefecture, and 80 km per hour through the more mountainous section between Phonhong and Vang Vieng Districts. The road includes double tunnels measuring almost 900 m (3,000 ft) through Phoupha Mountain.

The expressway is 95 percent owned by Chinese developer Yunnan Construction Engineering Group, who are also the developer, and five percent by the Laotian government. The cost is estimated at US$1.2 billion. The developer will retain a 50 year concession on tolls from the expressway.

=== List of interchanges ===
- Vientiane
- Ban Nasone
- Ban Boua
- Ban Saka (Phonkham)
- Ban Phonhong (Nam Ngum dam)
- Muang Hinherb
- Nguem lake (Ban Vangkhi)
- Muang Vang Vieng

== Vang Vieng–Luang Prabang Expressway ==
In 2020, the Lao government has approved the construction of the second section from Vang Vieng to Luang Prabang, with a length of 137 km (85 mi). Survey works were completed in 2024.

Once completed, the travel time would be reduced from 6 hours to 90 minutes.

== See also ==
- Vientiane–Boten railway
