= G8511 Kunming–Mohan Expressway =

Expressway in Yunnan, China

Kunming–Mohan Expressway
- 昆明－磨憨高速公路
- Kunmo Expressway 昆磨高速公路

Route information
- Auxiliary route of G85
- Part of AH3

Major junctions
- North end: G78 Shantou–Kunming Expressway and G80 Guangzhou–Kunming Expressway, Kunming, Yunnan
- South end: Mohan, Xishuangbanna Dai Autonomous Prefecture, Yunnan (when complete); China National Highway 213 and Xiaomo Highway (to China National Highway 214), Jinghong, Xishuangbanna Dai Autonomous Prefecture, Yunnan (current)

Location
- Country: China

Highway system
- National Trunk Highway System; Primary; Auxiliary; National Highways; Transport in China
← G85	→ G8512

Kunming-Mohan Expressway
- Traditional Chinese: 崑明—磨憨高速公路
- Simplified Chinese: 昆明—磨憨高速公路
Transcriptions
Standard Mandarin
- Hanyu Pinyin: Kūnmíng-Mòhān Gāosùgōnglù
- Wade–Giles: K'unming-Mohan Kaosukunglu
Yue: Cantonese
- Yale Romanization: Kwun1 ming2-mwo4 han1 gau1 su4 gung1 lu4
- Jyutping: Gwan1 ming4-mo4 ham1 gou1 cuk1 gung1 lou6

Kunmo Expressway
- Traditional Chinese: 崑磨高速公路
- Simplified Chinese: 昆磨高速公路
Transcriptions
Standard Mandarin
- Hanyu Pinyin: Kūnmò gāosùgōnglù
- Wade–Giles: K'unmo kaosukunglu
Yue: Cantonese
- Yale Romanization: Kwun1 mwo4 gau1 su4 gung1 lu4
- Jyutping: Gwan1 mo4 gou1 cuk1 gung1 lou6

The Kunming–Mohan Expressway (Chinese: 昆明—磨憨高速公路), designated as G8511 and commonly referred to as the Kunmo Expressway (Chinese: 昆磨高速公路), is an expressway that connects Kunming, Yunnan, China, and Mohan, a town on the border with Laos, in Xishuangbanna Dai Autonomous Prefecture, Yunnan. The expressway is a spur of G85 Chongqing–Kunming Expressway and is entirely in Yunnan Province.

The Kunming–Mohan Expressway forms the Chinese portion of the Kunming–Bangkok Expressway, to Bangkok, Thailand. Mohan, the southern terminus, is on the China–Laos border and there is a border checkpoint which connects to Route 13 and later to Vientiane–Boten Expressway in Laos. It was completed in 2017.

China National Highway 213 parallels much of this route but is not an expressway.
