= Nong Het district =

Nong Het district ເມືອງໜອງແຮດ
- District
- Location within Laos
- Coordinates: 19°29′44″N 103°59′13″E
- Country: Laos
- Province: Xiangkhouang
- Time zone: UTC+7 (ICT)

Nong Het District is a district (muang) of Xiangkhouang province in north-central Laos.
