= G8512 Jinghong–Daluo Expressway =

Road in China

Jinghong–Daluo Expressway
- 景洪－打洛高速公路
- Jingda Expressway 景打高速公路

Route information
- Auxiliary route of G85
- Length: 111.59 km (69.34 mi)

Major junctions
- West end: G323 / S320 in Menghai County, Xishuangbanna Dai Autonomous Prefecture, Yunnan
- East end: G8511 in Jinghong, Xishuangbanna Dai Autonomous Prefecture, Yunnan

Location
- Country: China

Highway system
- National Trunk Highway System; Primary; Auxiliary; National Highways; Transport in China
← G8511	→ G8513

The G8512 Jinghong–Daluo Expressway (Chinese: 景洪—打洛高速公路), also referred to as the Jingda Expressway (Chinese: 景打高速公路), is an expressway in Yunnan, China that connects Jinghong to the China–Myanmar border in Menghai County.

== History ==
Construction of the expressway started in December 2018 with the first section opening to traffic on 15 January 2021.
