= Phoukhoune district =

Phoukhoune district ເມືອງພູຄູນ
- District
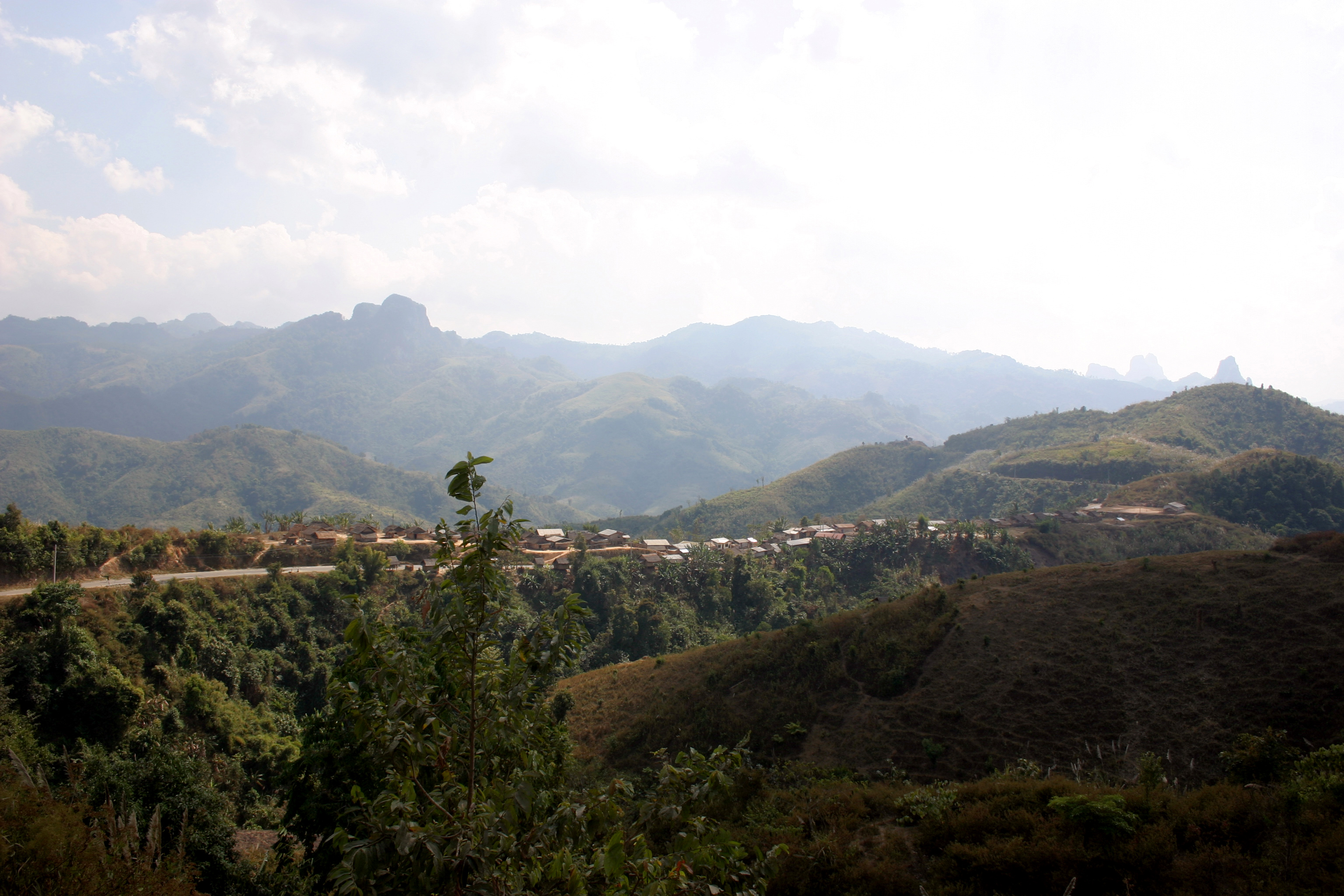
- Landscape
- Interactive map of Phoukhoune district
- Country: Laos
- Province: Luang Prabang
- Time zone: UTC+7 (ICT)

Phoukhoune is a district (muang) of Luang Prabang province in northern Laos.
