= Subdistricts of Laos =

Sub-district (Lao: ຕາແສງ, romanized: tasseng) is the lowest level of Laos's administration. It was once part of Laos's administrative divisions, but was abolished in 1991; however, it was not completely eliminated, and its restoration was announced in 2025, with Laos's comprehensive revision of the Local Administration Law.

== List ==
=== Vientiane Capital Region ===
Sub-district	Name in Lao	District	Villages
Kao Liew	ເກົ້າລ້ຽວ	Sikhottabong District	14
Nong Niew	ໜອງໜ້ຽວ	Sikhottabong District	8
Si Koet	ສີເກີດ	Naxaithong District	18
I Lai	ອີ່ໄລ	Naxaithong District	8
Phon Thong	ໂພນທອງ	Naxaithong District	8
Xang Mi Xay	ຊ້າງມີໄຊ	Xaythany District	24
Si Vilay	ສີວິໄລ	Xaythany District	23
Houa Xiang	ຫົວຊຽງ	Xaythany District	23
Tha Ngon	ທ່າງ່ອນ	Xaythany District	17
Dong Bang	ດົງບັງ	Xaythany District	17
Bo O	ບໍ່ໂອ	Hadxayfong District	11
Xay Fong	ຊາຍຟອງ	Hadxayfong District	16
Salakham	ສາລະຄໍາ	Hadxayfong District	14
Tha Duea	ທ່າເດືອ	Hadxayfong District	11
Simmano	ສິມມະໂນ	Hadxayfong District	8
Phia Lat	ເພຍລາດ	Sangthong district	9
Sa Kai	ສະໄກ	Sangthong district	15
Na Charoen	ນາຈະເລີນ	Sangthong district	11

=== Vientiane Province ===
Sub-district	Name in Lao	District	Villages
Phon Si–Phon Ho	ໂພນສີ-ໂພນຫໍ	Phonhong District	11
Phon Hong–Na Lao	ໂພນໂຮງ-ນາເຫຼົ່າ	Phonhong District	16
Sa Ka–Na Pho	ສະກ້າ-ນາໂພ	Phonhong District	13
Na Lao–Phon Soung	ນາເລົາ-ໂພນສູງ	Phonhong District	19
Ban Kern	ບ້ານເກິນ	Thoulakhom District	-
Na Pheng	ນາແພງ	Thoulakhom District	-
Tan Piao	ຕານປ່ຽວ	Thoulakhom District	-
Na Khong	ນາຄອງ	Thoulakhom District	-
Long Lik	ລ່ອງລີກ	Keo Oudom District	12
Thin Kaeo	ຖິ່ນແກ້ວ	Keo Oudom District	14
Pha Chao	ຜາເຈົ້າ	Kasy District	10
Phu Kham	ພູຄຳ	Kasy District	17
Ban Chiang	ບ້ານຈຽງ	Kasy District	24
Mueang Vang Vieng	ເມືອງວັງວຽງ	Vangvieng District	61
Na Long Kwang	ນາລ້ອງກວາງ	Vangvieng District	13
Na Mon	ນາມອນ	Vangvieng District	19
Pha Tang	ຜາຕັ້ງ	Vangvieng District	14
Pha Sang	ຜາສັງ	Feuang District	-
Ban Don	ບ້ານດອນ	Feuang District	-
Pak Ngua	ປາກງວ້າ	Feuang District	-
Xanakharm	ຊະນະຄາມ	Xanakharm District	14
Nam Kuan	ນໍ້າກວນ	Xanakharm District	12
Khok Khao Do	ຄົກເຂົ້າດໍ	Xanakharm District	7
Muang Mad	ເມືອງແມດ	Mad District	11
Na Kang Pa	ນາກ້າງປາ	Mad District	8
Nam Phan	ນໍ້າແຜນ	Mad District	8
Mueang Khi	ເມືອງຄີ	Mad District	6
Phon Mi	ໂພນໝີ	Viengkham District	-
Pak Chaeng	ປາກແຈ້ງ	Viengkham District	9
Hin Heup	ຫີນເຫີບ	Hinhurp District	-
Pha Bong	ຜາບ່ອງ	Hinhurp District	-
Na Sam	ນາຊຳ	Hinhurp District	-
Daeng Mi Sai	ແດງມີໄຊ	Meun District	6
Non Hai	ໂນນໄຮ	Meun District	9
Hom Thao	ຮົ່ມທ້າວ	Meun District	7

=== Champasak Province ===
Sub-district	Name in Lao	District	Villages
Pakse	ປາກເຊ	Pakse District	
Khankheung	ຄັນເກີງ	Pakse District	
Chok Amnuay	ໂຊກອໍານວຍ	Pakse District	
Sanamxay	ສະໜາມໄຊ	Pakse District	
Wang Wern	ວັງເວີນ	Sanasomboun District	
Nong Du	ໜອງດູ່	Sanasomboun District	
Bung Kha	ບຸ່ງຄ້າ	Sanasomboun District	
Saphay	ສະຜ່າຍ	Sanasomboun District	
Kaeng Kaeo	ແກ້ງເກ່ຍ	Batiengchaleunsouk District	
Nong Sai	ໜອງໃສ	Batiengchaleunsouk District	
Houay Hae	ຫ້ວຍແຮ່	Batiengchaleunsouk District	
Hua Sae	ຫົວແຊ	Batiengchaleunsouk District	
Paksong	ປາກຊ່ອງ	Paksong District	
I Tu	ອີ່ຕູ້	Paksong District	
Kong Toon	ກອງຕູ່ນ	Paksong District	
Oudomsin	ອຸດົມສິນ	Paksong District	
Xe Nam Noi	ເຊນໍ້ານ້ອຍ	Paksong District	
Muang	ມ່ວງ	Pathouphone District	
Pathouphone	ປະທຸມພອນ	Pathouphone District	
Bun	ບຸ່ນ	Pathouphone District	
Phapho	ພະໂພ	Pathouphone District	
Nam Om	ນໍ້າອ້ອມ	Pathouphone District	
Kao Koeng	ເກົ່າເກິ່ງ	Phonthong District	
Kut Chik	ກຸດຈິກ	Phonthong District	
Phonthong	ໂພນທອງ	Phonthong District	
Dong Yang	ດົງຍ່າງ	Phonthong District	
Sak Muang	ສັກເມືອງ	Phonthong District	
Champassack	ຈໍາປາສັກ	Champassack District	
Nong Vien	ໜອງວຽນ	Champassack District	
Don Talat	ດອນຕະລາດ	Champassack District	
Nong Taem	ໜອງແຕ້ມ	Champassack District	
Nong Pham	ໜອງຜໍາ	Champassack District	
Soukhoumma	ສຸຂຸມາ	Soukhoumma District	
Oudoumphorn	ອຸທຸມພອນ	Soukhoumma District	
That Sam Pang	ທາດສາມປາງ	Soukhoumma District	
Nyaeng Samphan	ຫຽງສໍາພັນ	Soukhoumma District	
Samliang	ສໍາຫຼຽງ	Soukhoumma District	
Wern	ເວີນ	Mounlapamok District	
Nadi	ນາດີ	Mounlapamok District	
Kadan	ກະດັນ	Mounlapamok District	
Nong Nga	ໜອງງາ	Mounlapamok District	
Khong	ໂຂງ	Khong District	
Hat Sai Khoun	ຫາດຊາຍຄູນ	Khong District	
Kadan	ກະດັນ	Khong District	
Khon	ຄອນ	Khong District	
Khamouan	ຂະເໝົາ	Khong District	

=== Attapeu Province ===
Sub-district	Name in Lao	District	Villages
Phon Sa Art	ໂພນສະອາດ	Saysetha district	6
Phameuang	ພະເມືອງ	Saysetha district	8
