= Assaphone district =

Assaphone district ເມືອງອາດສະພອນ Atsaphone district
- District
- Interactive map of Assaphone district
- Coordinates: 16.94°N 105.39°E
- Country: Laos
- Province: Savannakhet

Area
  - Total: 572 sq mi (1,482 km^{2})

Population (2015)
  - Total: 59,600
- Time zone: UTC+7 (ICT)

Assaphone or Atsaphone is a district (muang) of Savannakhet province in southern Laos. It covers an area of approximately 1,482 km^{2} (572 sq mi) and had a population of 59,600 in 2015. It is subdivided into 60 villages.

== Geography ==
Assaphone is one of the 15 districts (muang) of Savannakhet Province, Laos. It covers an area of approximately 1,482 km^{2} (572 sq mi). It is bordered by Viraboury, Thaphalanxay, Atsaphangthong, Outhoumphone, and Xayboury districts of Savannakhet Province and Sebangphay, and Xaibouathong districts in Khammouane Province.

The Xe Champhone River flows through Atsaphone District, as well as neighbouring Champhone and Atsaphangthong districts. The Phou Xang He National Protected Area covers approximately 1,180 km^{2} (460 sq mi) across Assaphone, Thaphalanxay, Phine, Seponh and Viraboury districts. The district has a tropical monsoon climate as per the Köppen climate classification.

The district is subdivided into 60 villages. According to the 2015 census, 33 of the villages had access to electricity, 49 had road access, four had a market, eight had a health facility, 59 had a school, and one had water supply.

== Demographics ==
According to the 2015 census, Assaphone District had a population of 59,600, including 29,300 males and 29,900 females. The district had 9,700 households, with an average household size of 6.1 persons. According to a World Bank report, the population was estimated to have increased to 66,660 in 2020, based on an assumed annual growth rate of 1.99%. A 2025 estimated a population of 64,728, with approximately 69% belonging to the Phu Thai ethnic group and 27.7% to the Bru ethnic group. In 2018, the district had a poverty rate of 52.76%.

== Economy ==
According to a research report in 2008 based on one of the villages in the district, rural population was predominantly involved in rice cultivation, fishing, livestock raising, collection of non-timber forest products, handicraft production, and wage labour. In 2024, the district produced 67 tonnes of rice.
