= Xayboury district =

Xayboury ເມືອງໄຊບູລີ Xaybuly
- District
- Interactive map of Xayboury
- Coordinates: 16.93°N 104.93°E
- Country: Laos
- Province: Savannakhet

Area
  - Total: 912.8 km^{2} (352.4 sq mi)

Population (2015)
  - Total: 59,774
- Time zone: UTC+7 (ICT)

Xayboury or Xaybuly is a district (muang) of Savannakhet province, Laos. It covers an area of approximately 912.8 km^{2} (352.4 sq mi) and had a population of 59,774 in 2015. It is subdivided into 53 villages.

== Geography ==
Xayboury is one of the 15 districts (muang) of Savannakhet Province, Laos. It covers an area of approximately 912.8 km^{2} (352.4 sq mi). The district borders Sebangphay and Nong Bok districts of Khammouane province, and Assaphone, Outhoumphone and Khanthaboury districts of Savannakhet Province.

The Xe Bang Fai River river flows through the district with several villages in Xayboury are situated near its banks. The Nam Theun 2 Dam, which began operations in 2010, altered the flow of the Xe Bang Fai River, causing it to flood quicker than earlier.

The district is subdivided into 53 villages. According to the 2015 census, all 53 villages had access to electricity and roads, and 52 had a school. One village had a public water supply system, two had a market, and 13 had a health facility.

== Demographics ==
According to the 2015 census, Xayboury District had a population of 59,774, comprising 2,549 people in urban areas and 57,225 in rural areas. The average household size was 5.9 people. Based on a 2019 study of two villages in the district, the population predominantly belonged to Lao ethnic group. In 2018, the district had a poverty rate of 16.5%.

== Economy ==
Agriculture is a principal economic activity in Xayboury District, particularly rice cultivation. In 2016, the district was the second-largest rice producer in Savannakhet Province after Champhone. It produced 62,901 tonnes of rice from approximately 14,600 ha (36,000 acres) during the wet season and 49,910 tonnes of rice from 8,928 ha (22,060 acres) during the dry season. Fishing and animal husbandry are other livelihood activities. In November 2023, a cassava processing plant was established in the district. While the facility provided a market for locally produced cassava, it has led to complaints from residents of nearby villages due to the odour and noise from the plant.
