= Thapangthong district =

Thapangthong district ເມືອງທ່າປາງທອງ
- District
- Interactive map of Thapangthong district
- Country: Laos
- Province: Savannakhet

Area
  - Total: 2,116 km^{2} (817 sq mi)

Population (2015)
  - Total: 40,584
- Time zone: UTC+7 (ICT)

Thapangthong is a district (muang) of Savannakhet province in southern Laos. It covers an area of approximately 2,116 km^{2} (817 sq mi) and had a population of 40,584 in 2015. It is subdivided into 42 villages.

== Geography ==
Thapangthong is one of the 15 districts (muang) of Savannakhet Province, Laos. It covers an area of approximately 2,116 km^{2} (817 sq mi). The district is located approximately 147 km (91 mi) south of Kaysone Phomvihane. It borders Phine and Xonboury districts to the north, Songkhone district to the west, and Lakhonepheng district of Salavan province to the south, Toumlane and Vapy districts of Salavan province to the east.

The district is located at an average elevation of about 219 m (719 ft) above sea level. In 2016, dry dipterocarp forest accounted for 42.8% of the district's area, followed by mixed deciduous forest (39.4%) and agricultural land (16.3%). Water bodies (1.2%) and built-up land (0.3%) occupied the remaining land area. The district contains three designated forest areas–the Xebangnouane National Biodiversity Conservation Area, the Dong Sithouane Production Forest Area, and the Xetanoune National Protection Forest.

The district is subdivided into 42 villages. According to the 2015 census, 35 villages had road access, 17 had access to electricity, 41 had a school, eight had a health facility, three had a market and two had water supply.

== Demographics ==
According to the 2015 census, Thapangthong District had a population of 40,584 including 3,875 urban residents and 36,709 living in rural areas. A 2018 study reported a district population of 42,563. As per the study, the two major ethnic groups in the district were Katang (58%) and Lao (42%). A 2023 report by the Lao Statistics Bureau and the World Bank estimated the district's population at 44,952 and a poverty rate of 41%. Thapangthong was identified as one of four malaria-endemic districts in Savannakhet Province in a 2019 study.

== Economy ==
The Xe Salalong River, fed by Xe Pong, a tributary of Xe Bang Hieng, supplies water to agricultural lands and households. In 2020, 861.2 hectares (2,128 acres) of land was under cultivation in the Xe Salalong irrigation system. The Xe Salalong irrigation system supports the cultivation of several crops, including rice, maize, cucumber, watermelon, yardlong bean and chili pepper. In 2024, the district produced 32 tonnes of rice.
