= Nong district =

Nong district ເມືອງນອງ
- District
- Interactive map of Nong district
- Country: Laos
- Province: Savannakhet province

Area
  - Total: 704 sq mi (1,824 km^{2})

Population (2015)
  - Total: 29,622
- Time zone: UTC+7 (ICT)

Nong is a district (muang) of Savannakhet province in southern Laos. It covers an area of approximately 1,824 km^{2} (704 sq mi) and had a population of 29,622 in 2015. It is subdivided into 70 villages.

== Geography ==
Nong is one of the 15 districts (muang) of Savannakhet Province, Laos. It covers an area of approximately 1,824 km^{2} (704 sq mi), representing about 8.85% of the province's total area. The district is located approximately 256 km (159 mi) from the provincial municipality of Savannakhet. It borders Phine district to the west, Seponh district to the north, Ta Oy district and Sa Mouay district of Salavan province to the south, and shares a land border with Vietnam to the east.

Nong is situated in the upland of the Xe Bang Hieng River basin. The Xe Lanong River flows from the south through the central part of the district before exiting to the east. The district's land cover consists primarily of regenerating vegetation (53.5%), mixed deciduous forest (22.3%) and evergreen forest (13.9%). Agricultural lands account for approximately 6.6% of the district's area. The district has ten reservoirs and nine natural ponds.

The district has a tropical monsoon climate, with a dry season from November to early May and a wet season from May to October. The average temperature reaches a maximum of 42 °C (108 °F) in April. The district receives an average annual rainfall of approximately 1,592 mm (62.7 in), with most precipitation occurring during the wet season.

The district is subdivided into 70 villages. According to the 2015 census, 20 of the villages had access to electricity, 44 had road access, two had a market, eight had a health facility, 43 had a school, and four had water supply. The district's population is concentrated mainly around the central part, with Nongvilai being the most populous village.

== Demographics ==
According to the 2015 census, Nong District had a population of 29,622. A 2018 estimate put the district's population at 34,109. The district is inhabited by seven major ethnic groups: Lao (40%), Phouthai (20%), Makong (15%), Katang (10%), Tri (8%), Pako (5%), and Ta Oi (2%), according to the 2018 population estimate. In 2018, the district had a poverty rate of 61.8%.

== Economy ==
In 2019, Nong District had a gross domestic product (GDP) of 244 billion kip, an increase of 26 billion kip compared with 2014. Agriculture accounted for 78.9% of the district's GDP, followed by services (14.7%) and industry (7.4%). The average GDP per capita was 7.37 million kip. While agriculture is a major economic activity in the district, it is less intensive than in the other lowland districts of Savannakhet Province. In 2024, the district produced two tonnes of rice.
