= Champhone district =

Champhone district ເມືອງຈຳພອນ
- District
- Interactive map of Champhone district
- Coordinates: 16.49°N 105.22°E
- Country: Laos
- Province: Savannakhet

Area
  - Total: 1,065 km^{2} (411 sq mi)

Population (2015)
  - Total: 109,174
- Time zone: UTC+7 (ICT)

Champhone is a district (muang) of Savannakhet province in southern Laos. It covers an area of approximately 1,065 km^{2} (411 sq mi) and had a population of 109,174 in 2015. It is subdivided into 102 villages.

== Geography ==
Champhone is one of the 15 district (muang) of Savannakhet Province, Laos. It covers an area of approximately 1,065 km^{2} (411 sq mi). The district is located approximately 54 km (34 mi) southeast of the provincial capital Savannakhet. It is bordered by Songkhone, Thaphalanxay, Khanthaboury, Outhoumphone, Xonboury, Atsaphangthong, and Xaibouathong districts of Savannakhet Province.

The land cover consists primarily of rice fields (44.5%), mixed deciduous forest (26.7%) and dry dipterocarp forest (17%). The district lies on the lowland plain of the Xe Champhone river basin with an average elevation of 900 m (3,000 ft). Approximately 12 ha (30 acres) of the land in the district forms part of the Xe Champhone Wetlands, declared as a Ramsar site in 2010. The wetlands as an important habitat for the critically endangered Siamese crocodile. The topography is predominantly flat which contributes to the prolonged retention of surface water and flooding during periods of heavy rainfall. In 2024, the district had nine main reservoirs, 30 smaller reservoirs, 37 natural ponds, and several aquifiers.

The district has a tropical monsoon climate, with a dry season from November to early May and a wet season from May to October. The average temperature reaches the maximum in April at 42 °C (108 °F), with an average annual temperature was 26.13 °C (79.03 °F). The district received an average annual rainfall of 1,478.5 mm (58.21 in). The Xe Champhone River flows mostly during the rainy season from June until September.

The district is subdivided into 102 villages. According to the 2015 census, 100 of the villages had road access, 98 had access to electricity, 93 had a school, 32 had water supply, 26 had a health facility, and six had a market.

== Demographics ==
According to the 2015 census, Champhone District had a population of 109,174, including 15,658 people in urban areas and 93,516 in rural areas. A 2019 report estimated the district population as 115,915. The district is inhabited by four major ethnic groups– Lao, Phouthai, Makong and Katang. In 2018, the Lao people formed the majority with 77.4% of the population, followed by Thais (4.9%), Makongs (13.9%), and Katang (3.6%).

== Economy ==
In 2025, the district had a gross domestic product of 2,146 billion kip in 2019. Agriculture accounted for 67% of the district's GDP, industry for 18%, and services for 15%. The average GDP per capita was 18–30 million kip.

Agriculture is the principal economic activity with 90% of the rural population engaged in rice cultivation during the rainy season. About 80% of the population is engaged in agriculture, animal husbandry, and fishing, with the remaining working in services (10%), handicrafts (5%), and others (5%).
