= Atsaphangthong district =

Atsaphangthong district ເມືອງອາດສະພັງທອງ
- District
- Interactive map of Atsaphangthong district
- Coordinates: 16.71°N 105.33°E
- Country: Laos
- Province: Savannakhet

Area
  - Total: 673 km^{2} (260 sq mi)

Population (2015)
  - Total: 45,900
- Time zone: UTC+7 (ICT)

Atsaphangthong, also spelled Atsaphanthong, is a district (muang) of Savannakhet Province, Laos. It covers an area of approximately 673 km^{2} (260 sq mi) and had a population of 46,029 in 2015. It is subdivided into 40 villages.

== Geography ==
Atsaphangthong is one of the 15 district (muang) of Savannakhet Province, Laos. It covers an area of approximately 673 km^{2} (260 sq mi). It is bordered by Thaphalanxay, Assaphone, Champhone, and Outhoumphone Districts of Savannakhet Province. It is located along National Road 9, approximately 70 km (43 mi) from the Mekong River and 220 km (140 mi) from the Laos–Vietnam border. The Xe Champhone River flows through Atsaphangthong district, as well as neighbouring Champhone and Assaphone districts. The stream generally dries up between January and May, during which groundwater becomes the main source of water. The district has a tropical monsoon climate as per the Köppen climate classification.

The district is subdivided into 40 villages. According to the 2015 census, 37 of the villages had access to electricity and road access, three had a market, 11 had a health facility, 37 had a school, and three had public water supply.

== Demographics ==
Atsaphangthong District had a population of 40,237 in 2008. As per the 2015 population census, the population was 46,029, including approximately 22,700 males and 22,900 females. The district had approximately 6,900 households, with an average household size of 6.7 persons. In 2018, the district had a poverty rate of 18.72%.

Agriculture is the principal economic activity in the district, with rice being the staple crop grown during the rainy season. During the dry season, cash crops are cultivated in areas near water sources. In 2024, the district produced 47 tonnes of rice.
