= Songkhone district =

Songkhone district ເມືອງສອງຄອນ
- District
- Interactive map of Songkhone district
- Country: Laos
- Province: Savannakhet

Area
  - Total: 1,385 km^{2} (535 sq mi)

Population (2015)
  - Total: 100,006
- Time zone: UTC+7 (ICT)

Songkhone is a district (muang) of Savannakhet province in southern Laos. It covers an area of approximately 1,406 km^{2} (543 sq mi) and had a population of 100,006 in 2015. It is subdivided into 95 villages.

== Geography ==
Songkhone is one of the 15 districts (muang) of Savannakhet Province, Laos. It covers an area of approximately 1,385 km^{2} (535 sq mi). The district is located approximately 70 km (43 mi) from the provincial capital Savannakhet, along National Route 13 and about 55 km (34 mi) from the Laos-Thailand border. It borders Champhone, Xonboury, Thapangthong and Xaibouathong districts of Savannakhet Province, and Lakhonepheng district of Salavan Province.

The Banghiang River, a major tributary of the Mekong, flows through the district. As per a climate vulnerability report in 2024, all villages in Songkhone District have experienced drought in the dry season.

The district is subdivided into 95 villages. According to the 2015 census, 90 villages had access to electricity, 93 had road access, 13 had water supply, two had a market, 14 had a health facility, 85 had a school.

== Demographics ==
According to the 2015 census, Songkhone District had a population of 100,006, including 15,160 people in urban areas and 84,846 in rural areas. A 2018 study estimated the district's population at 103,868. Major languages spoken in the district include Lao and Phu Thau.

== Economy ==
Agriculture is the principal economic activity in Songkhone District. Major agricultural produce include rice, maize and vegetables. In 2024, the district produced 155 tonnes of rice, the most in the province. Other economic activities include animal husbandry, commerce, and services. In 2018, the district had a poverty rate of 24.6%.
