= Lan Chang province =

Coordinates: 19°15′N 101°30′E

Lan Chang Province จังหวัดลานช้าง
- Province of Thailand
- 1941–1946
- Flag Coat of arms

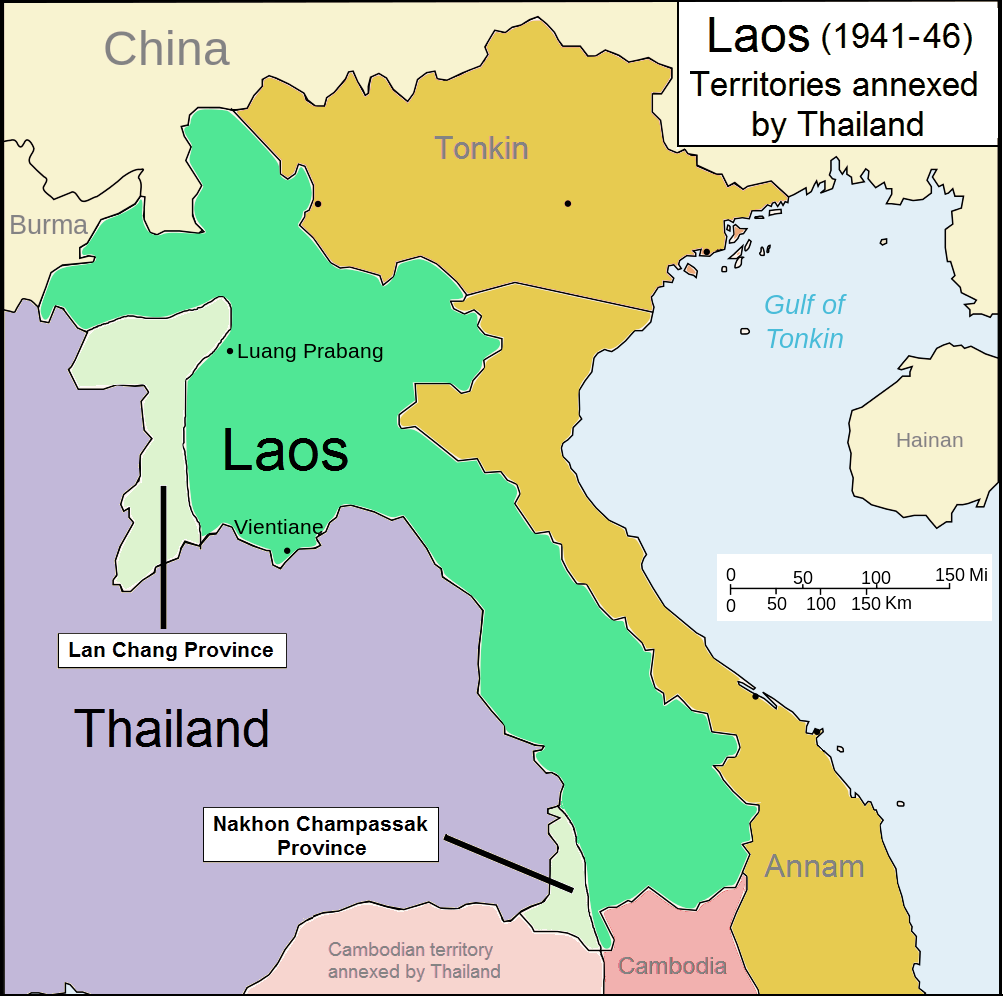
- Laos (1941-46): Territories annexed by Thailand following the Franco-Thai War.
- Historical era: World War II
  - Franco-Thai War: 1941
  - Washington Accord of 1946: 17 November 1946
Preceded by	Succeeded by
French Laos	French Laos
- Today part of: Laos

Siam's territorial losses to the European powers, shown as a map of Siam's territorial losses. The areas lost to France in 1904 are those annexed in 1941.

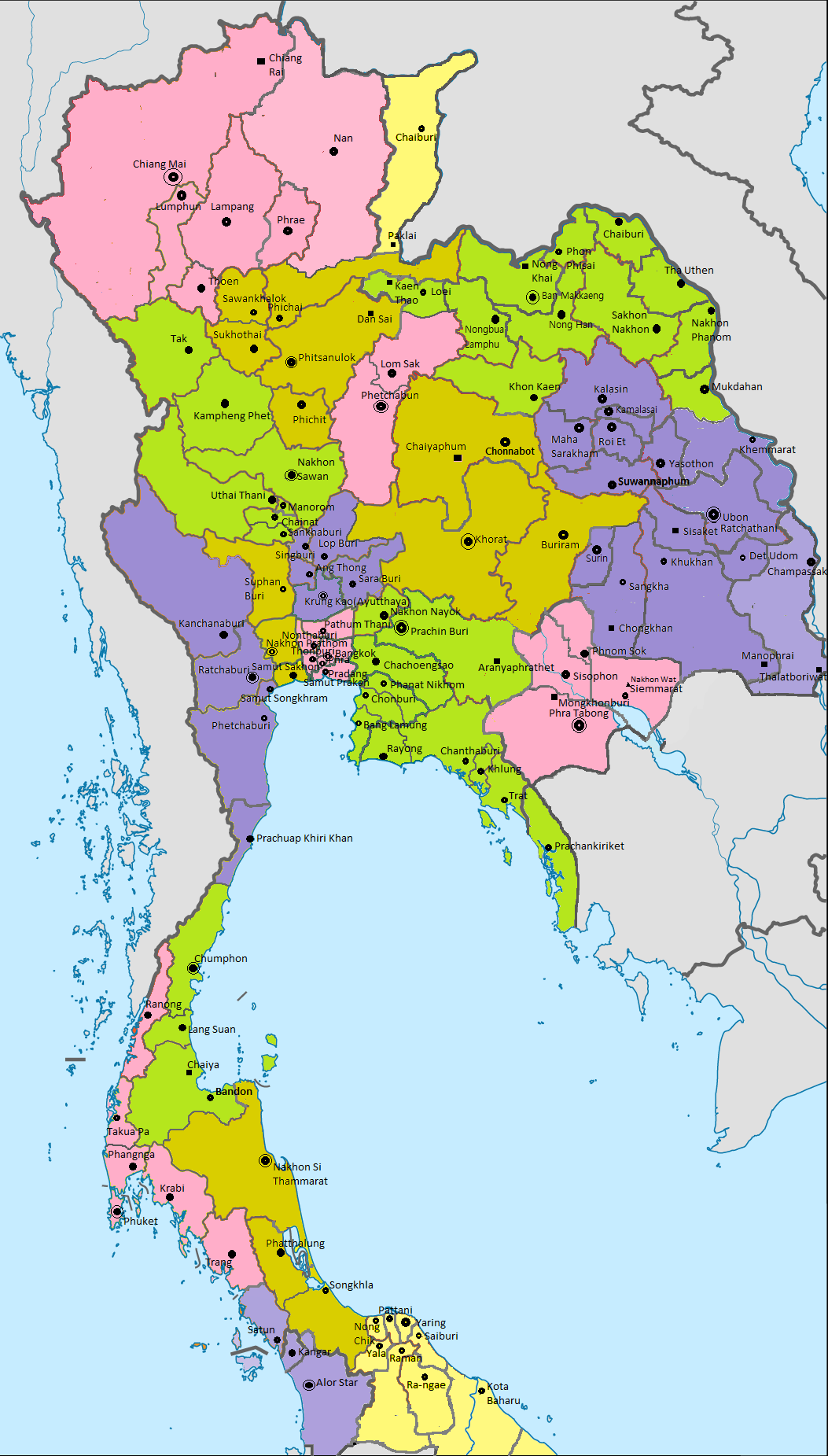
Map of Lan Chang under Siam's control in 1900

Lan Chang Province was a former province of the Kingdom of Thailand. It encompassed the eastern slopes of the Luang Prabang Range in Laos, with Xaignabouli (Sainyabuli) as the administrative headquarters. It included parts of former the Luang Prabang and Xaignabouli provinces of French Laos.

Annexed in 1941, Thailand returned it to French Indochina in 1946, along with all other areas it had gained by the war as a condition for admission to the United Nations. Accordingly, all wartime claims against Thailand were dropped and the kingdom received a substantial American aid package in gratitude for the assistance its anti-Japanese underground had provided to the Allied war effort.

== History ==
Lan Chang Province was named after the ancient Lan Xang kingdom, to which the area had once belonged. Its name means a 'Million Elephants'.

In 1904, Siam ceded the Laotian inhabited area of the Luang Prabang Range to colonial French Indochina.

In August 1940, after a series of border clashes, the Axis-leaning government of Thailand attacked French military posts on the eastern banks of the Mekong between Vientiane and Champassak Province. Both Thailand and the French colonial government would declare war. The more modern Thai Army won many victories on land, but the Royal Thai Navy was caught by a larger French fleet and suffered a humiliating defeat at the battle of Koh Chang. The Japanese government intervened to mediate a ceasefire. In the ensuing talks in 1941, the French colonial government was forced to cede western Champassak Province and all of Xaignabouli of Laos and Battambang Province of Cambodia to the Thais. Zaignabouli was renamed the province of Lan Chang. The Thai administration was not very active in the province during that time and the largely rural districts were pretty much left to themselves until they were reincorporated into Laos.

At the end of World War II France threatened to block Thai entry into the United Nations unless it returned the provinces that Thailand had captured during the second world war to their colonial empire. The Thai government, now under the control of members of the underground who had opposed the Japanese, was anxious to show its repudiation of the previous military government. It willingly signed the Washington Accord, surrendering all war time territorial gains. Lan Chang Province was returned to Laos in 1946 and resumed its pre-war name.

== Administrative divisions ==
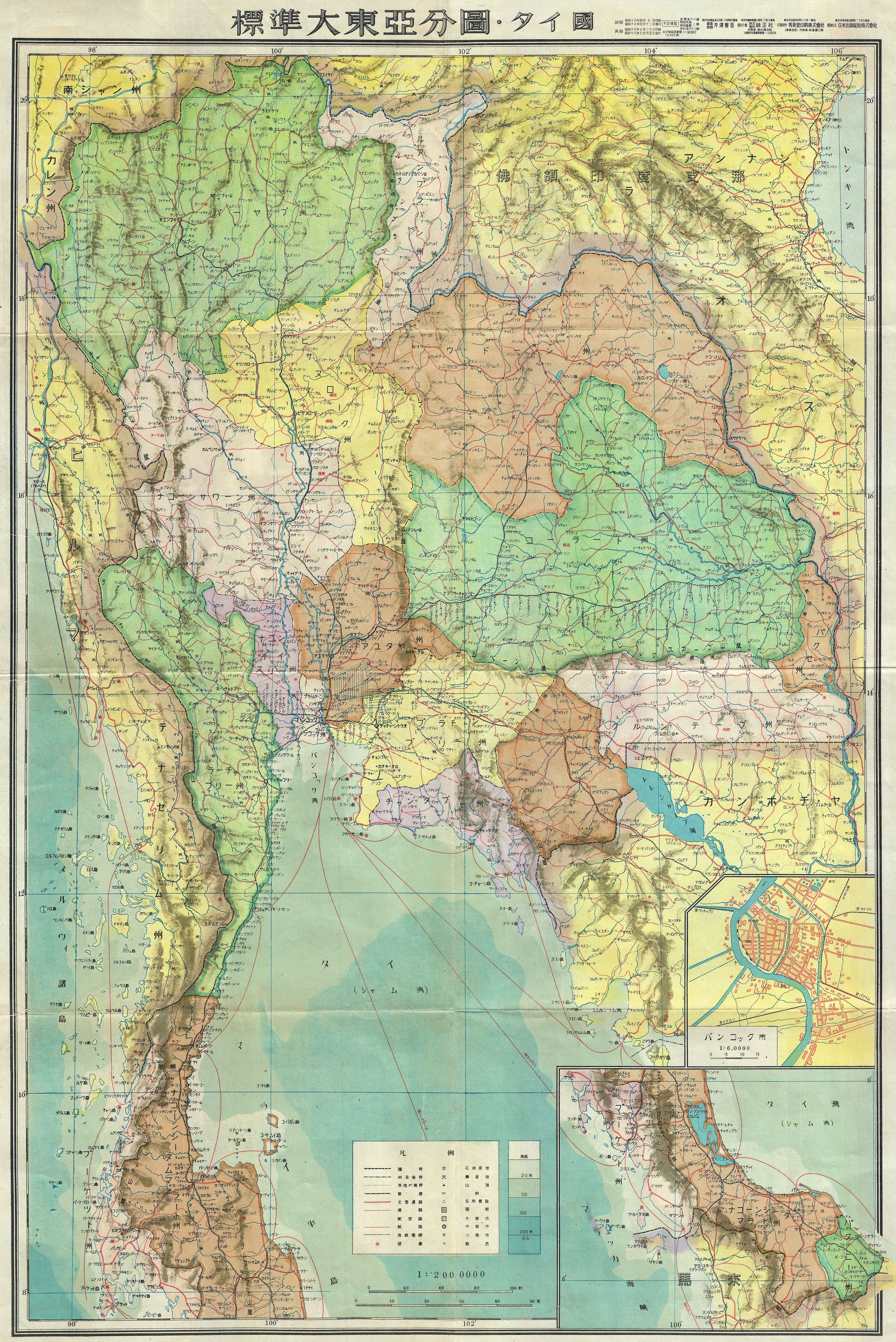
Map of Thailand during World War II in Japanese, 1943

During its short history, Lan Chang Province was divided into six districts (amphoe). They were established on 23 July 1941.

	Name	Thai	corresponding to Lao
1	Sama Buri	สมาบุรี	Xayabury District
2	Adundetcharat	อดุลเดชจรัส	Parklai District
3	Kaen Thao	แก่นท้าว	Kenethao District
4	Chiang Hon	เชียงฮ่อน	Xienghone District
5	Han Songkhram	หาญสงคราม	Hongsa District
6	Chiang Maen	เชียงแมน	Chomphet District

== See also ==
- History of Laos
- Seals of the provinces of Thailand

== Bibliography ==
- Søren Ivarsson, Creating Laos: The Making of a Lao Space Between Indochina and Siam, 1860-1945. NIAS monographs. (May 2008) ISBN 978-8776940232
