= Boriwen =

Boriwen (Thai: บริเวณ) were subdivisions of three of the larger Thai monthon. Several mueang were grouped together into one boriwen. In 1908 the boriwen were renamed to changwat, which became the name of provinces countrywide in 1916.

The monthon with between three and five boriwen were Phayap, Udon Thani and Isan. Each boriwen was administrated by a commissioner (khaluang boriwen, ข้าหลวงบริเวณ). The administrative headquarters of the boriwen were located in the provincial town listed first:

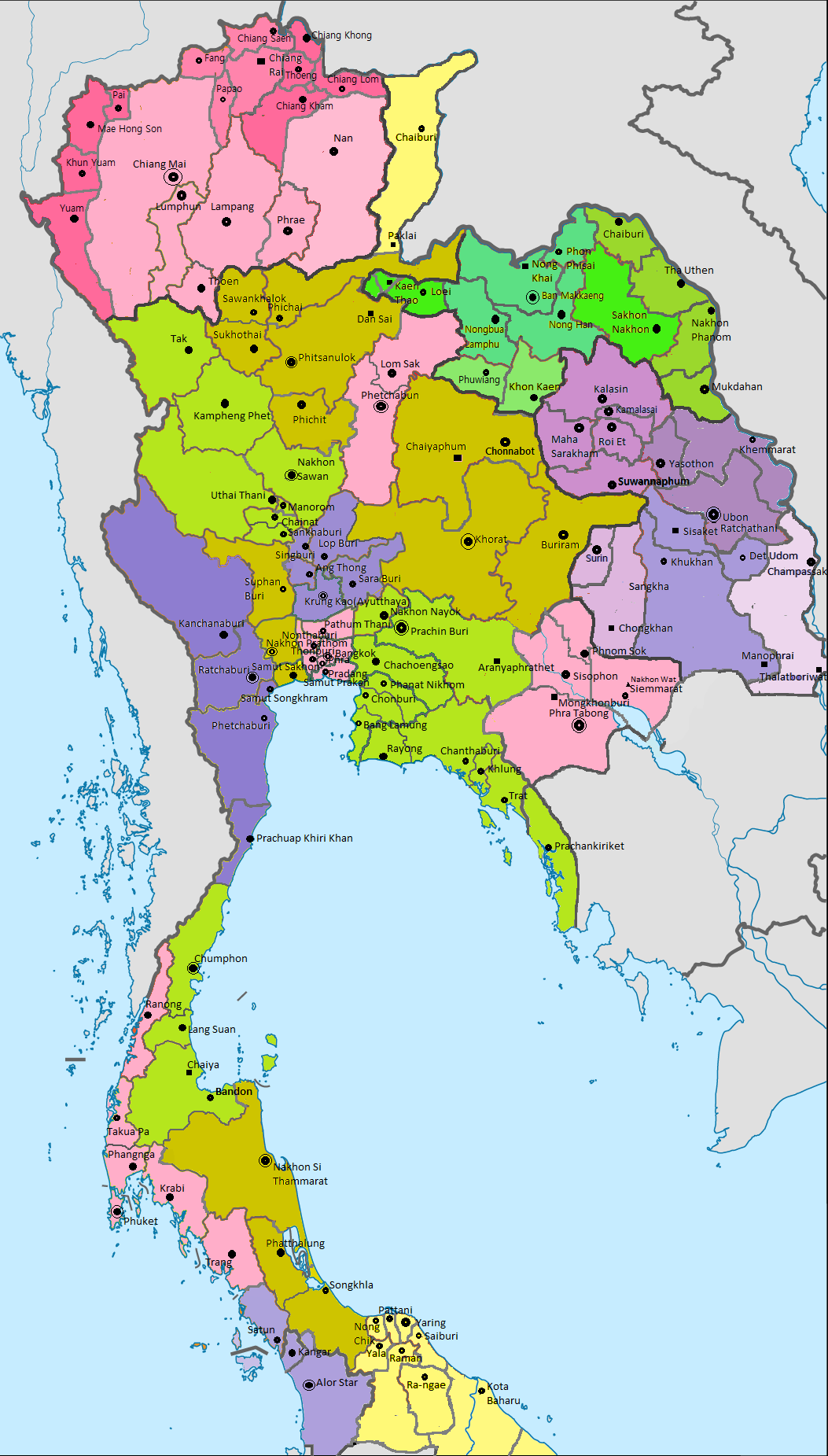
Map of Siam's Provinces and Subdivision

- Monthon Phayap
  - Boriwen Northern Chiangmai: Chiang Rai, Chiang Saen, Papao, Nongkhwang, and Fang
  - Boriwen Western Chiangmai: Mae Hong Son, Yuam, Khun Yuam, and Pai
  - Boriwen Northern Nan: Chiangkhong, Thoeng, Chiangkham, Chianglaeng, Chianglom, Chianghon, Khop, Ngeun or Kutsawadi (Khop and Kutsawadi were seceded to France in 1904)
- Monthon Udon Thani
  - Boriwen Makkhaeng: Ban Makkhaeng (Udonthani), Nongkhai, Nonglahan, Kumphawapi, Kamutthasai, Phonphisai, and Rattanawapi
  - Boriwen Phachi: Khonkaen, Chonnabot, and Phuwiang
  - Boriwen That Phanom: Nakhon Phanom, Chaiburi, Tha Uthen and Mukdahan
  - Boriwen Sakon: Sakon Nakhon
  - Boriwen Nam Huang: Loei, Kaen Thao, Bo Tha
- Monthon Isan
  - Boriwen Ubon: Ubon Ratchathani, Khemmarat, Yasothon
  - Boriwen Champassak (Bassac): Champassak (Bassac)
  - Boriwen Khukhan: Khukhan, Sisaket, and Det-udom
  - Boriwen Surin: Surin, and Sangkha
  - Boriwen Roi-et: Roi Et, Mahasarakham, Kalasin, Kammalasai, Suwannaphum

== See also ==
- Subdivisions of Thailand
