= Phou Xieng Thong National Protected Area =

Protected area in Laos

- IUCN category VI (protected area with sustainable use of natural resources)
- Location within Laos
- Location: Salavan and Champasak provinces, Laos
- Nearest city: Pakse
- Coordinates: 15°36′28″N 105°42′39″E
- Area: 1,200 km^{2} (460 sq mi) (decreed), 995–1,003 km^{2} (380–390 sq mi) (as proposed in 1999)
- Designated: 29 October 1993

Phou Xieng Thong National Protected Area is a national protected area in Salavan and Champasak provinces of southern Laos. This park, the country's only park on the Mekong river, is home to a wide variety of animal and plant species, some endangered. The park is an ecotourism destination.

== Geography ==
Phou Xieng Thong National Protected Area is located about 50 kilometres (30 mi) north of Pakse and covers parts of Salavan's Khongsedone and Lakhonepheng districts and Champasak's Sanasomboun district. The park's decreed area is 1,200 square kilometres (460 sq mi).

The park's western boundary is the Mekong river opposite Thailand's Ubon Ratchathani Province. Ubon's Pha Taem National Park is located on the western bank. Phou Xieng Thong elevations range from about 100 metres (330 ft) by the Mekong to the park's highest point, Phou Nangam at 716 metres (2,350 ft). Near-vertical cliffs rise from the Mekong to the plateau where most of the park is located.

== History ==
In 1983 Phou Kang Heuan, an area within the present park, was declared a Forest Reserve. Logging was ended within current park boundaries in 1992. In 1993 Phou Xieng Thong was declared a National Reserved Forest and National Biodiversity Conservation Area. Wildlife surveys began in 1996.

== Flora and fauna ==
The park's main forest type is semi-evergreen forest. Forest coverage is broken up by the rocky flats of the park's plateau at altitudes from 300 metres (1,000 ft) to 500 metres (1,600 ft).

The native forests of Phou Xieng Thong host a large variety of animals and birds, including endangered species. At least 16 mammal species and 188 bird species have been catalogued.

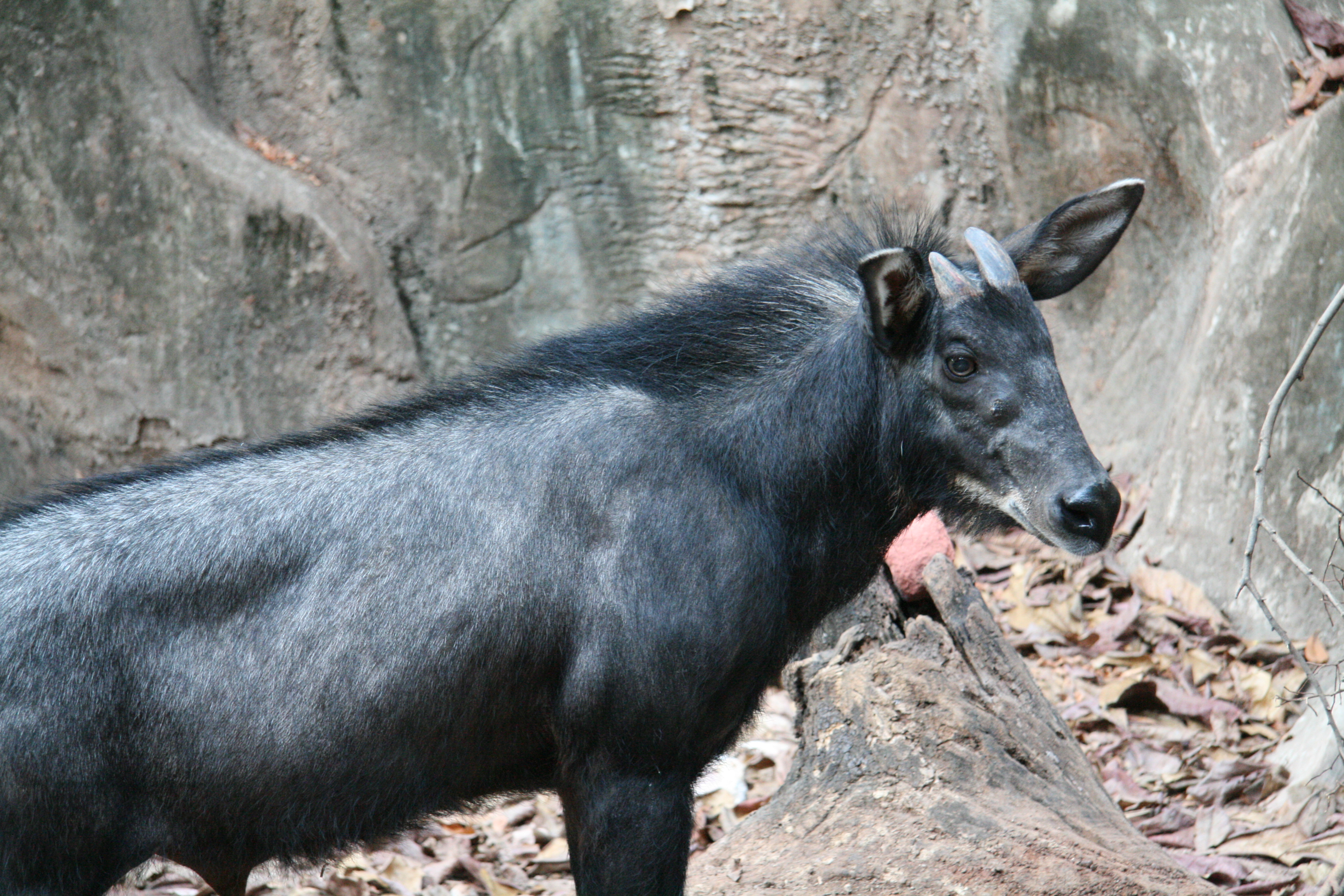
Sumatran serow

Animal species include Asian black bear, Sumatran serow, banteng, pangolin, monitor lizard and leopard.

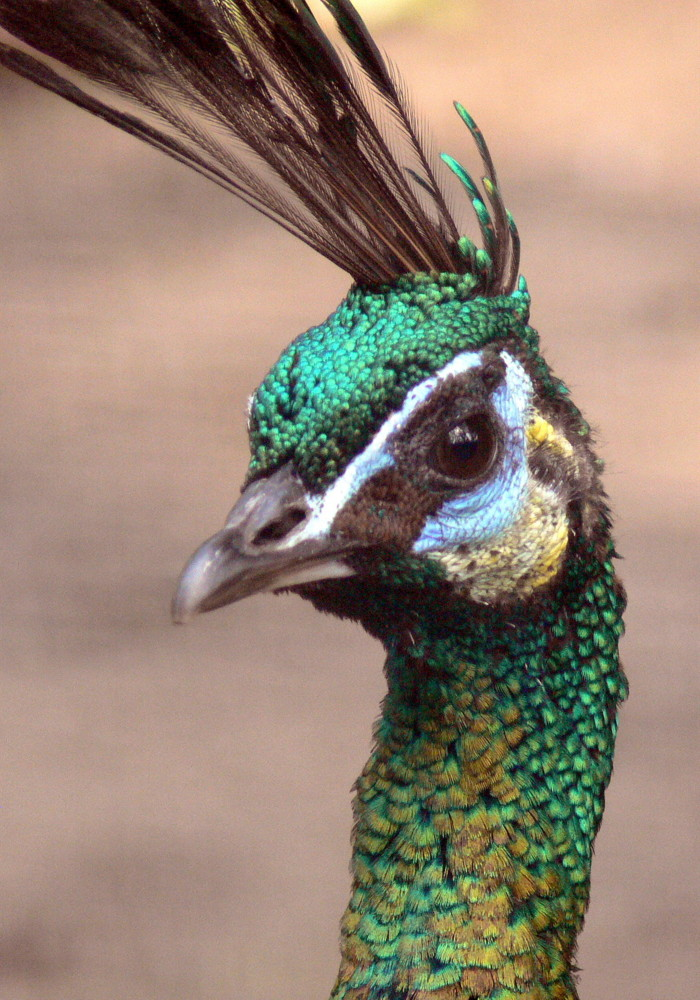
Green peafowl

The Phou Xiang Thong Important Bird Area (IBA) is located within the park. The IBA covers an area of 367 square kilometres (140 sq mi) including part of the Mekong's eastern bank. Endangered bird species in the IBA include green peafowl, grey-headed parakeet and red-collared woodpecker. Bird species rare within the park include red-vented barbet, eared pitta and grey-faced tit-babbler.

== Threats ==
Phou Xieng Thong faces a number of environmental threats. Attempts have been made to create and expand settlements along the Mekong section of the park. Destructive fishing practices, including the use of explosives, have occurred along the park's streams. Hunting of pangolins and monitor lizards is a concern. Logging is on a small scale but poses a long-term threat to forests and bird species.

== See also ==
- Protected areas of Laos
