= Lakhonepheng district =

Lakhonepheng district ເມືອງລະຄອນເພັງ
- District
- Coordinates: 15°53′N 105°33′E
- Country: Laos
- Province: Salavan
- Time zone: UTC+7 (ICT)

Lakhonepheng (Lao: ລະຄອນເພັງ) is a district (muang) of Salavan province in southern Laos. Lakhonepheng borders the districts of Khongxedone and Vapy in Salavan province to its south and east, Thapangthong and Songkhone districts in Savannakhet province to its north; it also borders the Mekong River which separates it from Ubom Ratcha province in Thailand in its west.

== 6th Thai-Lao Friendship Bridge ==
Plans for a 6th Thai-Lao Friendship Bridge connecting Lakhonepheng with the Thai district of Na Tan in Ubon Ratchathani province originated in 2019. In 2023 and 2024, talks progressed, with authorities beginning discussions to upgrade checkpoints on both sides. The upgrades will coincide with the bridge's construction, which is expected to begin in 2025 and finish in 2028. It will connect National Highway No. 2112 in Thailand with Highway No. 13 in Laos, and is expected to be 1,607 metres (1,757 yd) long, with the actual bridge being 1,020 metres (1,120 yd). Once completed, it will bolster trade between the two countries.
