= A Alao =

Village in Savannakhet Province, Laos

- Location in Laos
- Coordinates: 16°25′N 106°26′E
- Country: Laos
- Province: Savannakhet Province
- District: Nong
- Time zone: UTC+7 (ICT)

A Alao is a village in southeast Laos. It is in Nong District in Savannakhet Province.
