= La district =

La district ເມືອງຫຼາ
- District
- Interactive map of La district
- Country: Laos
- Province: Oudomxay

Population (2015)
  - Total: 17,173
- Time zone: UTC+7 (ICT)

La is a district (muang) of Oudomxay province in northwestern Laos.
