= Xaichamphon district =

Coordinates: 18.3917°N 104.4752°E

Xaichamphon district ເມືອງໄຊຈຳພອນ
- District
- Interactive map of Xaichamphon district
- Country: Laos
- Province: Bolikhamsai

Population (2020)
  - Total: 13,066
- Time zone: UTC+7 (ICT)

Xaichamphon is a district (muang) of Bolikhamsai province in central Laos.
