= Xiengkho district =

Xiengkho district ເມືອງຊຽງຄໍ້
- District
- Location within Laos
- Coordinates: 20.8053°N 104.1331°E
- Country: Laos
- Province: Houaphanh
- Time zone: UTC+7 (ICT)

Xiengkho is a district (muang) of Houaphanh province in northeastern Laos.
