= Seponh district =

Seponh district ເມືອງເຊໂປນ
- District
- Location within Laos
- Country: Laos
- Province: Savannakhet province

Area
  - Total: 810 sq mi (2,097 km^{2})

Population (2015)
  - Total: 56,213
- Time zone: UTC+7 (ICT)

Seponh is a district (muang) of Savannakhet province in southern Laos. It is located along the Laos-Vietnam border and covers an area of approximately 2,097 km^{2} (810 sq mi). It had a population of 56,213 in 2015. It is subdivided into 88 villages.

== Geography ==
Seponh is one of the 15 districts (muang) of Savannakhet Province, Laos. It covers an area of approximately 2,097 km^{2} (810 sq mi). The district is located in the eastern part of Savannakhet Province, along the border with Vietnam. It borders Viraboury, Phine and Nong districts of Savannakhet Province, and Boualapha district of Khammouane province. The district is located along the Laos-Vietnam border.

The district is situated in the upper catchment of the Xe Bang Hieng River basin. Other major rivers include Xe Kok and Xe Poun. The Xe Bang Hieng River is highly seasonal, with approximately 90% of river discharge occurring during the wet season. Floods affected 51 of the district's villages in 2018, 2019, and 2020. Part of the Phou Xang He National Protected Area is located within the district.

The district is subdivided into 88 villages. According to the 2015 census, 44 villages had access to electricity, 69 had road access, three had a market, 16 had a health facility, 60 had a school, and two had water supply.

== Demographics ==
According to the 2015 census, Seponh District had a population of 56,213, including 12,342 people in urban areas and 43,871 in rural areas. A 2018 study estimated the district's population as 72,011. The major ethnic groups included Makong (26% of the population in 2020), Tri (26%), Phouthai (24%), and Lao (6%). Other minor ethnic groups include Katang, Ta Oi, and Pacoh.

== Economy ==
Agriculture is the principal economic activity in Seponh District. According to a 2016 report by the Asian Development Bank, 97.2% of households were engaged in agriculture and forestry, while industry and handicrafts accounted for 0.2% and commerce and services for 2.6%. Major agricultural produce from the area include rice, banana and rubber. In 2024, the district produced 14 tonnes of rice. Commercial plantations are also present in the district. The Dansavanh Border Trade Zone, located along National Route 9, consists of eight villages and is an important economic resource for the district. The zone covers an area of approximately 1,823 ha (4,500 acres), including areas for commerce and industries. In 2018, the district had a poverty rate of 44%.
