= Sisattanak district =

Sisattanak district ສີສັດຕະນາກ Sisattanak
- Town
- Location in Laos
- Coordinates: 17°56′14″N 102°37′13″E
- Country: Laos
- Province: Vientiane Prefecture
- District: Sisattanak

Population (2015)
  - Total: 65,712
- Time zone: UTC+7 (ICT)

Sisattanak (Lao: ສີສັຕຕະນາກ, pronounced [sǐː sát.tā.nâːk]) is a district of Vientiane Prefecture, Laos.

== Villages ==
Sisattanak consisted of 37 villages as follow:

- Ban Pheowat
- Ban Kao Yot
- Ban Si Mueang
- Ban Dong Pa Lan Tha
- Ban Dong Pa Lan Thong
- Ban Nong CHan
- Ban Phon Sinuan
- Ban That Khao
- Ban Phaxai
- Ban Pha Pho
- Ban Bueng Khayong
- Ban Sok Pa Luang
- Ban Phon Sawan Nuea
- Ban Phon Sawan Tai
- Ban Wat Nak
- Ban Thong Kang
- Ban Tha Phalanxai
- Ban Don Pa Mai
- Ban Thung Phan Thong
- Ban Saphan Thong Nuea
- Ban Saphan Thong Tai
- Ban Don Nok Khum
- Ban Phon Pa Pao
- Ban Don Koy
- Ban Dong Sawat
- Ban Pho Sai
- Ban Sang Hueai
- Ban Phan Man
- Ban Wat Sip
- Ban Suan Mon
- Ban Hai Sok
- Ban Khok Nin
- Ban Phon Savang
- Ban Xai Satharn
- Ban Chom CHaeng
- Ban Chom Phet Nuea
- Ban Chom Phet Tai
