= Kham district =

Kham district ເມືອງຄຳ
- District
- Location within Laos
- Coordinates: 19°37′N 103°33′E
- Country: Laos
- Province: Xiangkhouang
- Time zone: UTC+7 (ICT)

Kham District is a district (muang) of Xiangkhouang province in north-central Laos.
