= Kounkham district =

Kounkham district ເມືອງຄູນຄຳ
- District
- Country: Laos
- Province: Khammouane
- Time zone: UTC+7 (ICT)

Kounkham is a district (muang) of Khammouane province in mid-Laos.
