= Pakngum =

Pakngum District ເມືອງປາກງື່ມ Mư̄ang Pākngư̄m
- District
- Location in Laos
- Coordinates: 18°03′55″N 102°54′07″E
- Country: Laos
- Province: Vientiane Prefecture
- District: Pakngum

Population (2015)
  - District: 49,211
  - Urban: 13,482
- Time zone: UTC+7 (ICT)

Pakngum (Lao: ເມືອງປາກງື່ມ, romanized: Mư̄ang Pākngư̄m, lit. 'District of Pakngum', pronounced [pȁːk ŋɯ̄ːm]) is a district of Vientiane Prefecture, Laos.
