= Phine district =

Phine district ເມືອງພີນ
- District
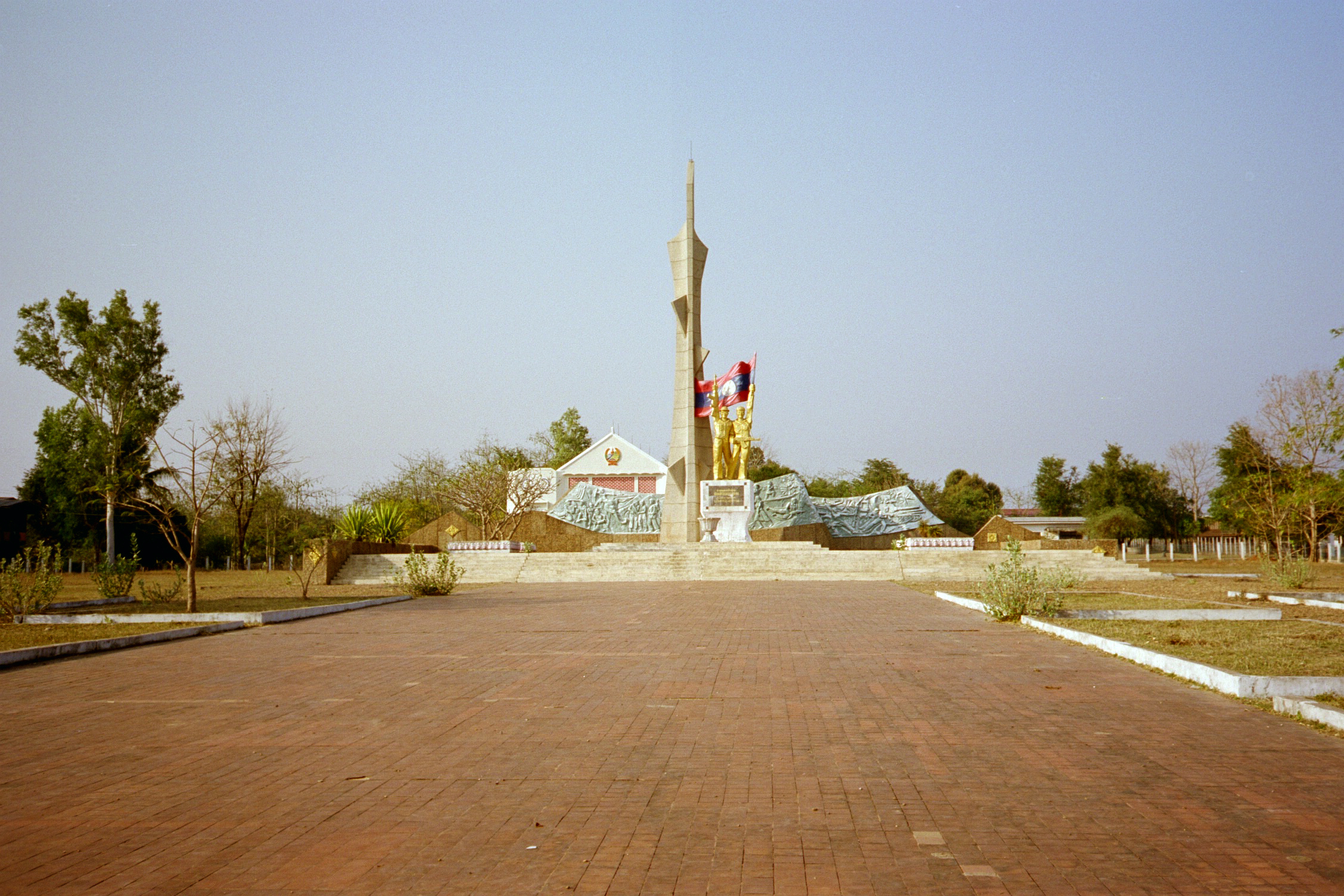
- Lao-Vietnam Friendship Monument in Phine District

- Location within Laos
- Coordinates: 16°52′N 106°02′E
- Country: Laos
- Province: Savannakhet

Area
  - Total: 3,299 km^{2} (1,274 sq mi)

Population (2015)
  - Total: 65,085
- Time zone: UTC+7 (ICT)
- Postal code: 1304
- ISO 3166 code: LA-SV-PH

Phine is a district (muang) of Savannakhet province in southern Laos. It covers an area of approximately 3,299 km^{2} (1,274 sq mi) and had a population of 65,100 in 2015. It is subdivided into 100 villages.

== Geography ==
Phine is one of the 15 districts (muang) of Savannakhet Province, Laos. It covers an area of approximately 3,299 km^{2} (1,274 sq mi). It borders Viraboury, Ta Oy, Toumlane, Seponh, Thapangthong, Thaphalanxay, Xonboury and Nong districts. The district is located along the East-West Economic Corridor, at the intersection of the National Route 9 which runs from the Laos-Thailand border to the Laos-Vietnam border and the National Route 23 which connects the Savannakhet province to the southern provinces of Attapeu, Saravane, and Sekong. The central part of the district is located on low lying plains approximately 61 km (38 mi) northeast of the Mekong River. The Sethamouak River, a tributary of the Mekong River, roughly divides the district into two.

The elevation ranges from approximately 148 m (486 ft) along the river to 182 m (597 ft) near the center of the district. The central portion is surrounded by low-lying areas and swamps with several seasonal rivers. The Dong Phou Vieng National Protected Area extends across Phine, Nong and Seponh districts. The district experiences a tropical monsoon climate, with a wet season from May to October and a dry season from November to February.

The district is subdivided into 100 villages. According to the 2015 census, 49 villages had access to electricity, 77 had road access, seven had water supply, six had a market, 14 had a health facility, 51 had a school.

== Demographics ==
According to the 2015 census, Phine District had a population of 65,085, with 9,136 living in urban and 49,801 classified as rural. A 2022 study reported a population of 68,259, with approximately 46.7% belonging to ethnic minority populations, mainly from the Mon-Khmer ethnolinguistic group. Other ethnic groups included Phouthai, Katang, and Mangkone.

== Economy ==
Agriculture is the main economic activity in the district. Major crops cultivated in the district include rice, rubber, and eucalyptus.

According to the 2017 assessment on a settlement in the district, agriculture accounted for approximately 55% of the sources of income, followed by animal husbandry (25%), casual labour (15%) and handicrafts (5%). In 2024, the district produced 29 tonnes of rice. Due to the location of the district along the highway connecting Thailand and Vietnam, it serves as a major trade and commercial center for goods originating from the two countries and the nearby city of Kaysone Phomvihane.

Phine was classified as one of the four poor districts of Savannakhet Province. In 2018, the district had a poverty rate of 35.2%.
