= 2018 Laos dam collapse =

2018 dam breach in Champasak Province, Laos

- Date: 23 July 2018
- Time: approx. 8:00 p.m. ICT
- Location: Attapeu and Champasak Provinces, Laos; 15°0′29″N 106°33′49″E
- Type: Dam failure
- Deaths: 71
- Missing: 98–110

The 2018 Laos dam collapse was the collapse of Saddle Dam D, part of a larger hydroelectric dam system under construction in southeast Laos's Champasak Province, on 23 July 2018. The dam collapse lead to widespread destruction and homelessness among the local population in neighbouring Attapeu Province. As of 25 September, 40 people were confirmed dead, at least 98 more were missing (maybe as many as 1,100 more people), and 6,600 others were displaced.

== Background ==
Construction of the earth-filled Saddle Dam D near Paksong, part of the $1.2bn (£915m) hydroelectric project by Xe-Pian Xe-Namnoy Power Company (PNPC), (Note: PNPC is a joint venture between several regional power companies, including Ratchaburi Electricity Generating Holding of Thailand, South Korea's Korea Western Power, and Laos' state-run power company.) was begun in 2013. The hydroelectric project was a build-operate-transfer project. PNPC is a joint investment venture formed in March 2012 by SK Engineering and Construction (SK E&C), Korea Western Power (KOWEPO), Ratchaburi Electricity Generating Holding (RATCH), and Lao Holding State Enterprise (LHSE). SK E&C holds a 26% stake in PNPC, LHSE 24%, and RATCH and KOWEPO equally own the remaining shares. Part of an overall project to build two main dams and five auxiliaries, by the time of the collapse, it was near to completion and was intended to open for business in 2019.

Although landlocked, Laos is traversed by many intertwining rivers, which has encouraged their damming. The dam's construction was part of a scheme to expand Laos's electricity generating capacity to become the 'battery' of Asia", due to the country's location on the Mekong river (Note: The BBC reported that as of 2017, Laos had 46 "operational hydroelectric power plants", with 54 more planned. Further, there are 10 dams already built and a similar number, including the one that burst, under construction. The Laos government has stated that by 2025, hydroelectric power will be the country's primary source of income. Two-thirds of the electricity Laos' produces is exported to its neighbours, especially Thailand and China. The ambitions of the Laotian government toward hydroelectric power were well known decades previously. In 1997, two scholars noted how "if Laos is to increase foreign exchange earnings quickly, then on the face of it, hydropower is an obvious option, one that the Lao government has embraced with fervour. A number of economic and political conditions have shaped the [then-]current craze for dam projects".) and "abundant natural resources". The dam was intended to form a chain with other dams in the adjacent province of Champasak, across the Houay Makchanh, Xe Namnoy and Xe Pian rivers.

The dam, close to the Cambodian border, was intended to operate to a capacity of 410 megawatts, and earn revenue for the government by exporting 90% of the electricity produced to Thailand, which is more economically prosperous and developed compared to Laos.

Environmental pressure groups have long been critical of the Laotian government's ambitions regarding hydroelectric power, which have involved building multiple dams on the Mekong as well as on its tributaries. Concern has focused on potential damage to the flora and fauna and the animal societies dependent on the river to survive. Neighboring countries, like Cambodia and Vietnam that are downstream from the dams and rely heavily on the Mekong for fishing, food, agricultural irrigation, transport, tourism and cultural traditions, have expressed concern that Laos' hydroelectric ambitions could "disrupt vital ecosystems and their own river systems". (Note: Laos has been described as "one of Asia’s poorest and most secretive countries". The latter characteristic, it has been suggested, has ensured that none of this criticism has come from within Laos, only from outside it.) The dam building program has regularly required the displacement and transplanting of inhabitants of villages that are found to obstruct dam construction, the benefits of which "are mainly enjoyed outside of the country", said environmental activists.

The company denied that the dam had collapsed, blaming recent heavy weather for the flooding, which had resulted in torrential rain filling the dam beyond capacity and overflowing, it said, which exacerbated the flooding which had already taken place downstream. A spokesperson for SK E&C said, "we believe that parts of the upper area of the dam were lost due to heavy rains and [then] the water overflowed". The International Rivers organization—whom the Washington Post described as "a nongovernmental group generally critical of such projects"—suggested that the collapse illustrates the "major risks" involved if construction is "unable to cope with extreme weather conditions", as, particularly in Laos, "unpredictable and extreme weather events are becoming more frequent". Indeed, an evacuation order had been in place for the area at the bottom of the dam due to cracks having been discovered in it. This damage had been reported to the company by South Korean contractors "at least a day before" the flooding, reported news outlets. Engineers from SK E&C apparently informed the PNPC that the top of the dam's structure had been washed away by 9 p.m. the previous night. Repair work was delayed because of the heavy rain. Furthermore, the Agence France-Presse (AFP) reported that it had obtained documents showing that "11 centimetres of subsidence was found at the centre of the dam" as early as the previous Friday. This subsidence was severe enough to prevent the use of emergency repair equipment.

On 11 September 2017, the reservoir for a dam under construction on the Nam Ao River in Phaxay district, Xiangkhouang Province collapsed after heavy rains in the area. In December 2016, the Xekaman 3 dam in Dak Cheung District, Sekong Province, had to be shut down after six years of usage due to damage in water tunnels.

== Collapse ==
The dam collapse occurred around 8 p.m. on Monday 23 July, and caused immediate flash flooding through the villages of Yai Thae, Hinlad, Ban Mai, Thasengchan, Tha Hin, and Samong, all in Sanamxay district. Homes, roads and bridges were swept away. The portion of the dam that collapsed was reported to be a saddle dam, known as "Saddle D", or "an auxiliary structure used to hold water beyond what is held by the main dam". The CEO of one of the companies involved stated that "[it] was fractured and the water had leaked to the downstream area and down to the Xe-Pian River which is about five kilometres from the dam".

Earlier in the day on 23 July, Lee Kang Yeol, Head of Resettlement Office of the Xe-Pian Xe-Namnoy Power Company Resettlement Office sent a warning letter to the provincial resettlement offices in Champasak and Attapeu Provinces indicating that water levels in the dam were high and that dam failure was imminent. The letter further urged that all residents in the Xe Pian river valley be evacuated to higher ground immediately.

Lao News Agency reported that "several human lives" had been lost, and that around 6,000 people may have been made homeless as a result. There were no precise figures regarding casualties within the first 24 hours, although The Guardian reported "hundreds missing" and "several" confirmed dead early the following morning. At least six villages were severely affected—around 1,300 households—with many survivors stranded on their rooftops and in trees. By 25 July, nearly 3,000 people had been rescued. The village of Ban Mai alone had 50 inhabitants known to be missing. Rescue efforts were complicated by the fact that the area is densely forested with no mobile-phone coverage, which may also have contributed to the uncertainty as to casualty rates. What roads previously existed were washed away in the floods, and the affected villages were only approachable by either helicopter or flat-bottomed boats.

As of 23 September, 40 people were confirmed dead, at least 98 more were missing and 6,600 others were displaced.

=== Response and aid ===
Government agencies and the power company jointly commenced a rescue and evacuation of villages still in danger, amid rising water levels. They were joined by a South Korean company, SK Engineering and Construction, which was a stakeholder in the dam's construction. The Prime Minister of Laos, Thongloun Sisoulith, suspended his immediate meetings and travelled in person to the site, as did the President and board of SK E&C. Sisoulith also called in both the police and the army, and declared the area a disaster zone on Tuesday. Local government requested emergency aid from central government as well as neighbouring communities. One of the largest banks in Laos, Banque Pour Le Commerce Exterieur Lao, set up a relief donation fund seeking to raise 2 billion kip (US$238,000) for victims of the disaster. The neighbouring Asian countries of China, Malaysia, Philippines, Singapore, Thailand and Vietnam have also expressed readiness to provide any assistance needed by Laos. In the immediate aftermath of the disaster, Chinese companies and businesses in Laos that were involved in the construction of China-Laos railway immediately joined the rescue work efforts. Thai rescue workers reportedly complained that Laos had shown lethargy in allowing them entry, meaning that they had been kept waiting at the border. The International Red Cross organized water purification devices for the area as each village lost its food supplies, while the Asean Coordinating Centre for Humanitarian Assistance (AHA Centre) relief items were dispatched from its warehouse in Malaysia to Vientiane by the Royal Malaysian Air Force (RMAF).

On 26 July, South Korean President Moon Jae-in ordered a relief team to be sent into the country, a rare order from their president for any accident in foreign country since a South Korean firm was involved in the incident. Singapore announced that they will be sending their Civil Defence Force (SCDF) officers and US$100,000 to aid relief efforts, with the Singapore Red Cross (SRC) also announced S$50,000 in humanitarian aid. Singapore Armed Forces (SAF) delivered S$280,000 in flood relief supplies on Thursday evening while officers from SCDF will arrive on Friday. The Vietnamese government has provided a total of US$200,000 relief aid, with another US$50,000 coming from their Defence Ministry and another VND300 million (US$13,000) from Agriculture and Rural Development Ministry. Vietnam Electricity (EVN) have contributed around VND1 billion (US$43,000) while the Vietnam Red Cross Society (VRC) Central Committee handed over US$50,000 to the Laos embassy in Vietnam. The Vietnamese People's Army (VPA) sent a contingent team of 100 officers, including medics and rescue vehicles to assist in relief efforts.

A 32-strong team People's Liberation Army (PLA) medical contingent was also dispatched, together with the arrival of relief supplies from Thailand. Mercy Malaysia has sent a rapid assessment team to assist in both severe flooding caused by the dam collapse and tropical storm Son-Tinh, with the Malaysian government also conveyed to their Laotian counterpart that they will donating RM400,000 (US$100,000) to assist Laos to facilitate its relief efforts. On 30 July, the Cambodian government donated $100,000 relief aid. The following day, Chinese relief aid began to arrived into the Laotian capital. South Korean government also deciding to send more aid along with the offer of US$1 million aid shortly after the arrival of medicine and relief supplies from the country. Another relief team consisting of 19 medical personnel was sent by South Korea on 7 August. Apart from the aid of South Korean government, SK Group has offered to donate $10 million relief aid, Korean Air has sent 36,000 litres of mineral water with 2,000 blankets and Lotte Group has donated US$100,000. Foreign individuals living in Laos also helping to deliver aid by raising money from their food businesses. Government compensation for lives lost amounted to 1.5 million Lao kip (U.S. $176) for each person.

== Aftermath ==
Within days of the disaster, survivors were questioning why they had received so little warning before it happened, "with some of the displaced saying they were warned to evacuate homes only hours before disaster struck". It was unclear how the damage affect the overall plan for Laos' hydroelectric ambitions. Meanwhile, shares in the various companies connected to the project, particularly SK E&C plunged immediately following the disaster.

== See also ==
- List of dam failures
- List of hydroelectric power station failures
- Dam failure
- Tropical Storm Son-Tinh (2018) – a tropical cyclone that is strongly related to or caused the dam collapse.

== Sources ==
- Al Jazeera (29 July 2018). "Laos struggles to find missing after dam collapse | Laos News | Al Jazeera". www.aljazeera.com. Al Jazeera.
- Bangkok Post (26 July 2018). "Thai aid reaches southern Laos for dam victims". Bangkok Post.
- BBC Asia (24 July 2018). "Laos country profile". BBC.
- BBC News (24 July 2018). "Laos dam collapse: Hundreds missing after flash floods hit villages". BBC.
- Business Standard (13 August 2018). "Death toll reaches 36 in Laos dam collapse, 98 missing". Business Standard.
- Channel News Asia (25 July 2018a). "26 bodies found after Laos dam collapse, hundreds still missing". Channel NewsAsia.
- Channel News Asia (26 July 2018b). "SCDF set to send officers to Laos to aid relief efforts, Singapore to donate US$100,000". Channel News Asia.
- Channel News Asia (26 July 2018c). "Singapore Red Cross pledges S$50,000 in aid after Laos dam collapse". Channel News Asia.
- Coleman, Liam (3 August 2018). "Korean Air provides relief for Laos dam collapse victims". DFNIonline.com.
- Dehua, Chi (26 July 2018). "China deploys army medics to assist Laos rescue effort". gb Times.
- David, Sen (31 July 2018). "Government donates flood aid to Laos". Khmer Times.
- Dinh, H. (25 July 2018). "Laos dam disaster leaves 24 dead, scores missing". The Washington Post. Archived from the original on 25 July 2018.
- Doom, J.; Gittleson, B. (24 July 2018). "Several dead, hundreds missing after dam collapse in Laos". ABC News. Archived from the original on 24 July 2018.
- Dupont, A. (2001). East Asia Imperilled: Transnational Challenges to Security. Cambridge: Cambridge University Press. ISBN 978-0-52101-015-3.
- El País (24 July 2018). "Cientos de desaparecidos en Laos tras la rotura de una presa". El País.
- Ellis-Petersen, H. (24 July 2018). "Laos dam collapse: 'hundreds missing' after villages flooded". The Guardian.
- Environmental Impact (13 September 2011). "Resettlement and Ethnic Peoples' Development plan, Xe Pian Xe Namnoy Hydropower Project" (PDF). pnpc.com. PNPC.
- Ferrie, Jared (7 August 2018). "Landmine risk for thousands displaced by floods in Laos". Reuters.
- Gillespie, Kiri (4 August 2018). "Donation Donuts for Laos flood victims". The New Zealand Herald. Archived from the original on 1 October 2020.
- Goh, E. (2001). Developing the Mekong: Regionalism and Regional Security in China–Southeast Asian Relations. London: Routledge. ISBN 978-1-13497-496-2.
- Gong, Lina (23 August 2018). "Laos dam collapse: Regional response". Khmer Times.
- Hai, L. (24 July 2018a). "Vietnam offers to help Laos after dam collapse disaster". VNExpress.
- Hai, L. (29 July 2018b). "Vietnam assists Laos with dam collapse relief efforts". VNExpress.
- Idsala (24 July 2018a). "ນາຍົກສິງກະໂປ ປະກາດພ້ອມຊ່ວຍ ສປປ.ລາວ ຜ່ານຜ່າໄພພິບັດເຂື່ອນແຕກ" (in Lao). Idsala. Archived from the original on 10 December 2020.
- Idsala (24 July 2018b). "ລັດຖະບານມາເລເຊຍ ພ້ອມທີ່ຈະໃຫ້ການຊ່ວຍເຫຼືອແກ່ ສປປ.ລາວ ຕໍ່ກັບໄພພິບັດເຂື່ອນແຕກ" (in Lao). Idsala. Archived from the original on 7 December 2020.
- Idsala (26 July 2018c). "ຫວຽດນາມລະດົມທຸກກຳລັງຊ່ວຍ ສປປ.ລາວ ພ້ອມມອບເງິນເບື້ອງຕົ້ນ 200,000$ ແກ້ໄຂໄພພິບັດເຂື່ອນແຕກ" (in Lao). Idsala. Archived from the original on 30 September 2020.
- Irish Times (24 July 2018). "Hundreds missing as dam collapse causes flash floods in Laos". The Irish Times.
- Jianhua, Zhang; Shan, Wang; Huaxia (26 July 2018). "Feature: Chinese companies, businesses in Laos join rescue work in flood-hit area". Xinhua News Agency. Archived from the original on 26 July 2018.
- KLFM (24 July 2018). "Laos dam collapse leaves hundreds missing and unknown number feared dead". KL.FM.
- Korea Herald (25 July 2018). "Moon orders dispatch of emergency relief team to Laos". The Korea Herald.
- "Hundreds missing in dam collapse in Laos, Korean builder joining rescue operations". Yonhap. 25 July 2018. Archived from the original on 26 July 2018 – via Korea Joongang Daily.
- Korea Joongang Daily (31 July 2018b). "Seoul mulls more aid for flood relief in Laos". Yonhap News Agency. Korea Joongang Daily.
- Korea Times (24 July 2018a). "At least 100 missing in Laos after hydropower dam collapse". The Korea Times.
- Korea Times (26 July 2018b). "Helping Laos". The Korea Times.
- Kyodo News (24 July 2018). "Several dead, hundreds missing after Lao dam collapses: report". Kyodo News. Archived from the original on 24 July 2018.
- Laotian Times 2 (24 July 2018). "Villagers Evacuated As Xe-Pian Dam Set to Burst its Banks". Laotian Times.
- Laotian Times (25 July 2018). "UPDATE: Status and Condition of Attapeu Flood Victims". Laotian Times.
- Leary, N. (2008). Climate Change and Vulnerability. Chippenham: Earthscan. ISBN 978-1-84977-081-1.
- Lee, Wooyoung (7 August 2018). "South Korea sends second disaster relief team to Laos". UPI.
- McGuinness, A. (24 July 2018). "Laos dam collapse leaves hundreds missing and unknown number feared dead". Sky News.
- National News Bureau of Thailand (25 July 2018). "Thailand to send help to Laos after hydropower dam collapse". ThaiVisa. Archived from the original on 25 July 2018.
- Paddock, R. C.; Sang-Hun, C. (25 July 2018). "After Laos Dam's Failure, Rescuers Scramble to Save the Stranded". The New York Times.
- PNPC (2018a). "PNPC - Shareholders". www.pnpclaos.com.
- PNPC (2018b). "PNPC - Company Profile". www.pnpclaos.com.
- Radio Free Asia (22 December 2016). "Laos' Xekaman 3 Dam Break Shuts Off Power to Vietnam". Radio Free Asia.
- Radio Free Asia (20 September 2017). "Faulty Construction, Heavy Rain Cause Dam to Flood Lao Villages". Radio Free Asia.
- Radio Free Asia (23 August 2018). "Lao Government's Compensation For Villagers Affected by Dam Disaster 'Inappropriate'". Radio Free Asia.
- Rocamora, J. A. L. (25 July 2018). "PH ready to assist Laos after dam disaster". Philippine News Agency.
- The Star (27 July 2018a). "Mercy Malaysia sends team to flood-hit Laos". The Star.
- The Star (3 August 2018b). "Malaysia to donate RM400K to assist victims of Laos dam collapse". The Star.
- Thibault, H.; Philip, B. (25 July 2018). "La rupture d'un barrage au Laos, chronique d'un drame annoncé". Le Monde. Archived from the original on 25 July 2018.
- Usher, A. D.; Ryder, G. (1997). "Dam Building in Laos: The BOOT Era". In Usher, A. D. (ed.). Dams as Aid. London: Routledge. pp. 87–89. ISBN 978-1-13473-378-1.
- Vietnam Net (26 July 2018). "Vietnam sends $200,000 in aid to Laos after dam collapse". Vietnam News Agency. Vietnam Net. Archived from the original on 12 September 2020.
- Vietnam+ (3 August 2018a). "Defence ministry supports Laos to recover from dam collapse". Vietnam News Agency. Vietnam Net.
- Vietnam+ (27 July 2018b). "EVN offers support to victims of Lao dam collapse". Vietnam News Agency. Vietnam Net.
- Xinhua News Agency (31 July 2018). "China hands over massive emergency relief to Laos". Xinhua News Agency. Archived from the original on 31 July 2018.
- Yonhap News Agency (7 August 2018). "Lotte donates US$100,000 to flood-hit Laos". Yonhap News Agency. Archived from the original on 7 August 2018.
- Yusof, Amir (26 July 2018). "SAF delivers humanitarian supplies worth S$280,000 to Laos for flood relief". Channel NewsAsia. Archived from the original on 27 July 2018.
- ZX (25 July 2018). "China stands ready to offer aid and assistance after dam collapsed in Laos: FM". Xinhua News Agency. Archived from the original on 25 July 2018.
