= Mok May district =

Mok May district ເມືອງໝອກໃໝ່
- District
- Location in Laos
- Coordinates: 19°09′46″N 103°41′34″E
- Country: Laos
- Province: Xiangkhouang
- Time zone: UTC+7 (ICT)

Mok May District is a district (muang) of Xiangkhouang province in north-central Laos.
