= Xiengngeun district =

Xiengngeun ເມືອງຊຽງເງິນ
- District
- Country: Laos
- Province: Luang Prabang province
- Time zone: UTC+7 (ICT)

Xiengngeun is a district (muang) of Luang Prabang province in northern Laos.
