= Mahaxay district =

Mahaxay district ເມືອງມະຫາໄຊ
- District
- Country: Laos
- Province: Khammouane
- Time zone: UTC+7 (ICT)

Mahaxay is a district (muang) of Khammouane province in mid-Laos.
