= Pak Seng district =

Coordinates: 20.4447°N 102.8947°E

Pak Seng District ເມືອງວຽງຄຳ
- District
- Interactive map of Pak Seng District
- Country: Laos
- Province: Luang Prabang
- Time zone: UTC+7 (ICT)

Pak Seng is a district (muang) of Luang Prabang province in northern Laos.
