= Phou Xang He National Protected Area =

National protected area in central Laos

- IUCN category VI (protected area with sustainable use of natural resources)
- Location within Laos
- Location: Savannakhet Province, Laos
- Nearest city: Savannakhet
- Coordinates: 16°49′1″N 105°44′6″E
- Area: 1,060 km^{2} (410 sq mi) (decreed), 1,180 km^{2} (460 sq mi) (current estimate)
- Designated: 29 October 1993

Phou Xang He National Protected Area is a national protected area in Savannakhet Province in central Laos. This mostly pristine forested park is home to a large variety of important animal and bird species. The park is home to the Phu Tai and Katang ethnic groups and is an ecotourism destination.

== Geography ==
Phou Xang He National Protected Area is located about 100 kilometres (60 mi) east of Savannakhet, near the village of Phalan and covers parts of Assaphone, Thaphalanxay, Phin, Xepon and Viraboury districts. The park's area has been estimated at 1,180 square kilometres (460 sq mi).

== Flora and fauna ==
The park's main forest types are evergreen, mixed deciduous and dry dipterocarp forests. Mixed deciduous forest has the largest coverage at 44% of the park's area.

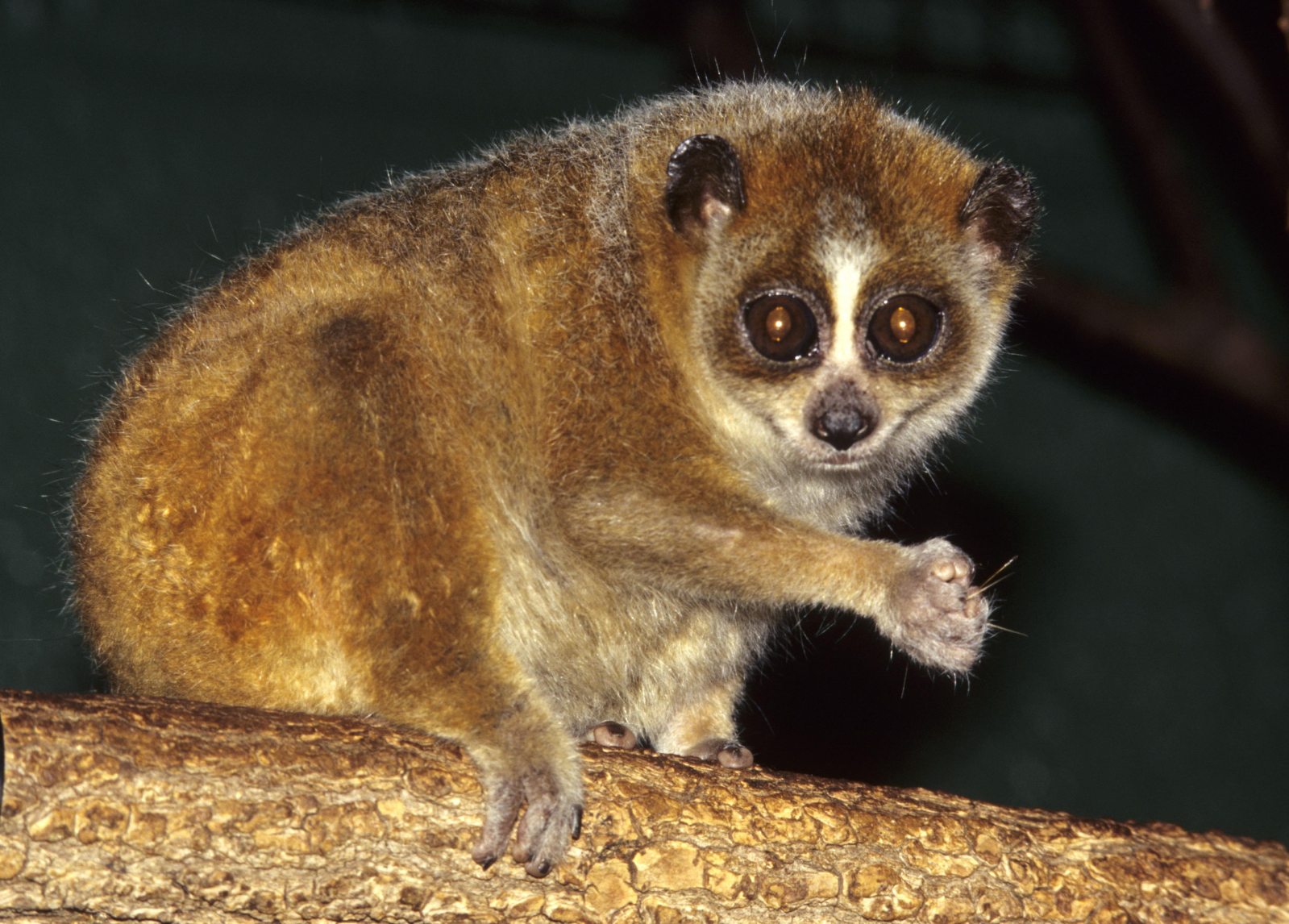
Pygmy slow loris

Threatened animal species in the park include elephant, tiger, leopard, clouded leopard, black crested gibbon, François' langur, giant muntjac, gaur, pygmy slow loris, dhole, Asian black bear, sun bear, banteng and large-spotted civet. Phou Xang He's large area and relatively pristine state make the park important in conserving these species in an undisturbed habitat. Other park species include macaque and douc langur.

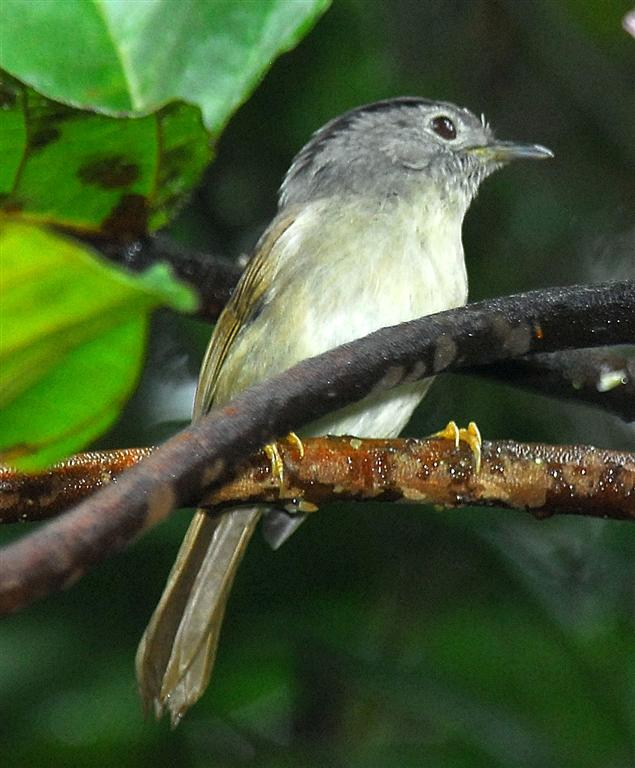
Mountain fulvetta

Bird life includes the threatened red-collared woodpecker. Other less vulnerable species include ratchet-tailed treepie and mountain fulvetta.

== Threats ==
Phou Xang He faces a number of environmental threats. Local poverty has resulted in hunting and forest product harvesting in the park. Some habitat loss has resulted from expansion of lands for agriculture. Road development and improvement may increase opportunities for illegal trade in wildlife and forest products.

== See also ==
- Protected areas of Laos
