= Thaphabat district =

Thaphabat district ເມືອງທ່າພະບາດ
- District
- Location of Thaphabat district in Laos
- Country: Laos
- Province: Bolikhamsai
- Time zone: UTC+7 (ICT)

Thaphabat is a district (muang) of Bolikhamsai province in central Laos.
