= Houameuang district =

Houameuang district ເມືອງຫົວເມືອງ
- District
- Interactive map of Houameuang district
- Country: Laos
- Province: Houaphanh
- Time zone: UTC+7 (ICT)

Houameuang District is a district (muang) of Houaphanh province in northeastern Laos.
