= Administrative divisions of Laos =

The administrative divisions of Laos are organised into three principal levels of government. At the first level, the country is divided into 17 provinces (khoueng) and one prefecture (nakhon louang), the Vientiane Prefecture, which has a status equivalent to a province.

The second level consists of districts (muang), which administer provincial territory and serve as the principal local administrative units.

Districts are further divided into sub-districts (tasseng), which have formed the lowest level of state administration.

== Structural hierarchy ==
Hierarchy
| Level | 1st | 2nd | 3rd | 4th |
|---|---|---|---|---|
| Division Type | Province (ແຂວງ) | District (ເມືອງ) | Sub-district (ຕາແສງ) | Village (ບ້ານ) |
| Division Type | Capital Region (ນະຄອນຫຼວງ) | District (ເມືອງ) | Sub-district (ຕາແສງ) | Village (ບ້ານ) |

== Provinces ==
| No. | Province | Capital | Area (km^{2}) | Population 2005 Census | Population 2015 Census | Population Mid 2023 Estimate |
|---|---|---|---|---|---|---|
| 1 | Attapeu | Attapeu (Samakkhixay district) | 10,320 | 112,120 | 139,628 | 147,000 |
| 2 | Bokeo | Houayxay (Houayxay district) | 6,196 | 145,263 | 179,243 | 213,300 |
| 3 | Bolikhamsai | Paksan (Paksane District) | 14,863 | 225,301 | 273,691 | 330,700 |
| 4 | Champasak | Pakse (Pakse District) | 15,415 | 607,370 | 694,023 | 781,200 |
| 5 | Houaphanh | Xam Neua (Xamneua District) | 16,500 | 280,938 | 289,393 | 317,100 |
| 6 | Khammouane | Thakhek (Thakhek District) | 16,315 | 337,390 | 392,052 | 451,300 |
| 7 | Luang Namtha | Luang Namtha (Namtha District) | 9,325 | 145,310 | 175,753 | 208,900 |
| 8 | Luang Prabang | Luang Prabang (Luang Prabang district) | 16,875 | 407,039 | 431,889 | 477,700 |
| 9 | Oudomxay | Muang Xay (Xay District) | 15,370 | 265,179 | 307,622 | 360,800 |
| 10 | Phongsaly | Phongsali (Phongsaly District) | 16,270 | 165,447 | 177,989 | 197,600 |
| 11 | Sainyabuli | Sayabouly (Xayabury District) | 16,389 | 338,669 | 381,376 | 439,400 |
| 12 | Salavan | Salavan (Salavan District) | 10,691 | 324,327 | 396,942 | 464,800 |
| 13 | Savannakhet | Savannakhet (Kaysone Phomvihane District) | 21,774 | 825,902 | 969,697 | 1,117,500 |
| 14 | Sekong | Sekong (Lamarm District) | 7,665 | 84,995 | 113,048 | 136,700 |
| 15 | Vientiane Prefecture | Vientiane (Chanthabouly district) | 3,920 | 698,318 | 820,940 | 1,009,300 |
| 16 | Vientiane Province | Phonhong (Phonhong District) | 15,610 | 361,891 | 419,090 | 479,400 |
| 17 | Xiengkhouang | Phonsavan (Pek District) | 14,751 | 229,596 | 244,684 | 274,400 |
| 18 | Xaisomboun | Anouvong (Anouvong district) | 8,551 | 66,427 | 85,168 | 116,800 |
| | Totals | | 236,800 | 5,621,982 | 6,492,228^{[a]} | 7,545,800 |

^{a} The 2015 Census total was estimated to have an under-enumeration of 2.76%, resulting in a revised 2015 estimate of 6,671,680.

== Districts ==
Each province is subdivided into districts (muang).

== History ==
After the Lao People's Democratic Republic was established in 1975, Laos was administratively divided into 16 provinces and the Vientiane municipality. These were subdivided into 112 districts, which are further divided into subdistricts (tasseng), and finally into more than 11,000 villages. In 1991, subdistricts were officially abolished in principle.

In mid-1992, Special Zone of Xienghone-Hongsa was established in Sainyabuli province. In June 1994, Special Zone of Xaisomboun was established.

In 2013, Xaisomboun Province was established, encompassing the territory of the former Special Zone of Xaisomboun.

=== 2025 administrative reform ===
In 2025, Laos proposed a comprehensive revision of the Local Administration Law, representing the country's most significant reform of local administration since the law was enacted in 2015.

A central feature of the reform is the reorganisation of the local administrative hierarchy. Under the proposal, sub-districts will replace villages as the lowest level of formal state administration.
