= Nane district =

Nane district ເມືອງນານ
- District
- Interactive map of Nane district
- Country: Laos
- Province: Luang Prabang
- Time zone: UTC+7 (ICT)

Nane is a district (muang) of Luang Prabang province in northern Laos.
