= Phonxay district =

Coordinates: 19.9489°N 102.5167°E

Phonxay district ເມືອງໂພນໄຊ
- District
- Interactive map of Phonxay district
- Country: Laos
- Province: Luang Prabang
- Time zone: UTC+7 (ICT)

Phonxay is a district (muang) of Luang Prabang province in northern Laos.
