= Nga district =

Nga district ເມືອງງາ
- District
- Interactive map of Nga district
- Coordinates: 20°10′30″N 101°57′30″E
- Country: Laos
- Province: Oudomxay

Population (2015)
  - Total: 30,938
- Time zone: UTC+7 (ICT)

Nga is a district (muang) of Oudomxay province in north-eastern Laos.
