= Outhoumphone district =

Outhoumphone district ເມືອງອຸທຸມພອນ
- District
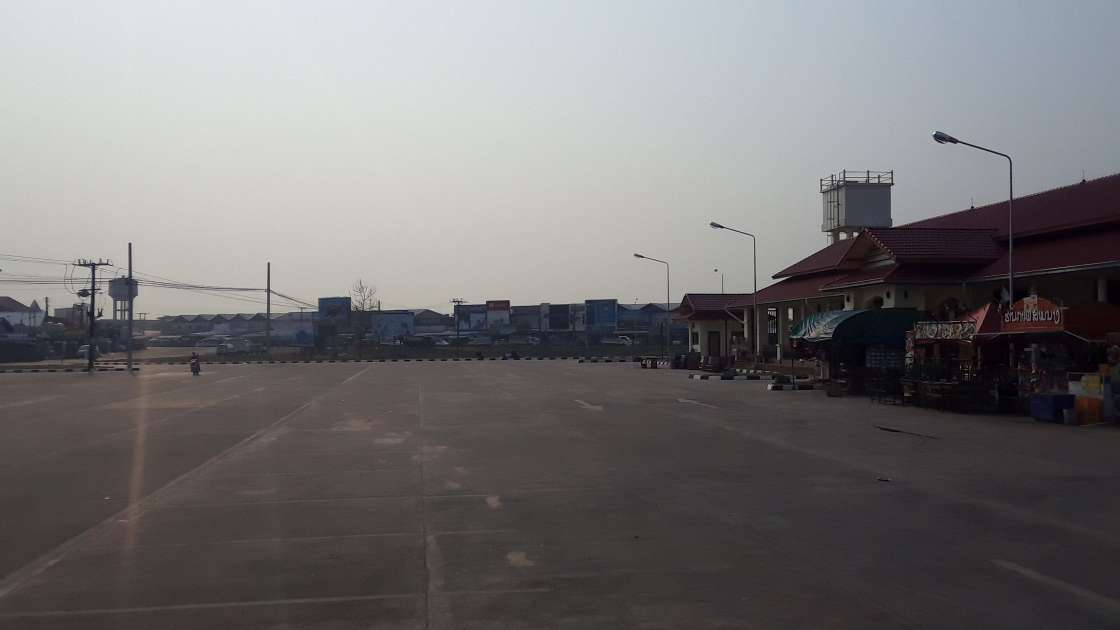
- Ban Xeno, Outhoumphone District
- Interactive map of Outhoumphone district
- Country: Laos
- Province: Savannakhet

Area
  - Total: 1,014 km^{2} (392 sq mi)

Population (2015)
  - Total: 90,945
- Time zone: UTC+7 (ICT)

Outhoumphone is a district (muang) of Savannakhet province in Laos. It covers an area of approximately 1,014 km^{2} (392 sq mi) and had a population of 90,945 in 2015. It is subdivided into 70 villages.

== Geography ==
Outhoumphone is one of the 15 districts (muang) of Savannakhet Province, Laos. It covers an area of approximately 1,014 km^{2} (392 sq mi). The district is located in the central part of Savannakhet Province, along the National Road 13, approximately 30 km (19 mi) from the provincial capital Savannakhet. It borders the districts of Champhone and Xaibouathong to the south, Kaysone Phomvihane to the east, Xayboury and Assaphone to the north and west. The district is situated on the lowland plains of central Savannakhet Province and no major rivers flow through the district.

The district is subdivided into 70 villages. According to the 2015 census, 68 villages had access to electricity, all 70 had road access, nine had water supply, five had a market, 10 had a health facility, 57 had a complete school and 10 had an incomplete school.

== Demographics ==
According to the 2015 census, Outhoumphone district had a population of 90,945, including 25,135 people in urban areas and 65,810 in rural areas. In 2019, the population was estimated to be 92,837. In 2018, the district had a poverty rate of 32.6%.

== Economy ==
Agriculture is the principal economic activity in Outhoumphone District. Rice is the predominant agricultural produce, followed by sugarcane, cassava, and rubber. In 2024, the district produced 59 tonnes of rice. Approximately 210 ha (520 acres) of land was under sugercane cultivation in 2011. The district's location along National Road 13 has facilitated the development of commerce and industries.
