= Hon district =

Hon district ເມືອງຮຸນ
- District
- Interactive map of Hon district
- Country: Laos
- Province: Oudomxay

Population (2015)
  - Total: 74,254
- Time zone: UTC+7 (ICT)

Hon is a district (muang) of Oudomxay province in northwestern Laos.
