= Pak Ou district =

Coordinates: 20.0325°N 102.2542°E

Pak Ou district ເມືອງປາກອູ
- District
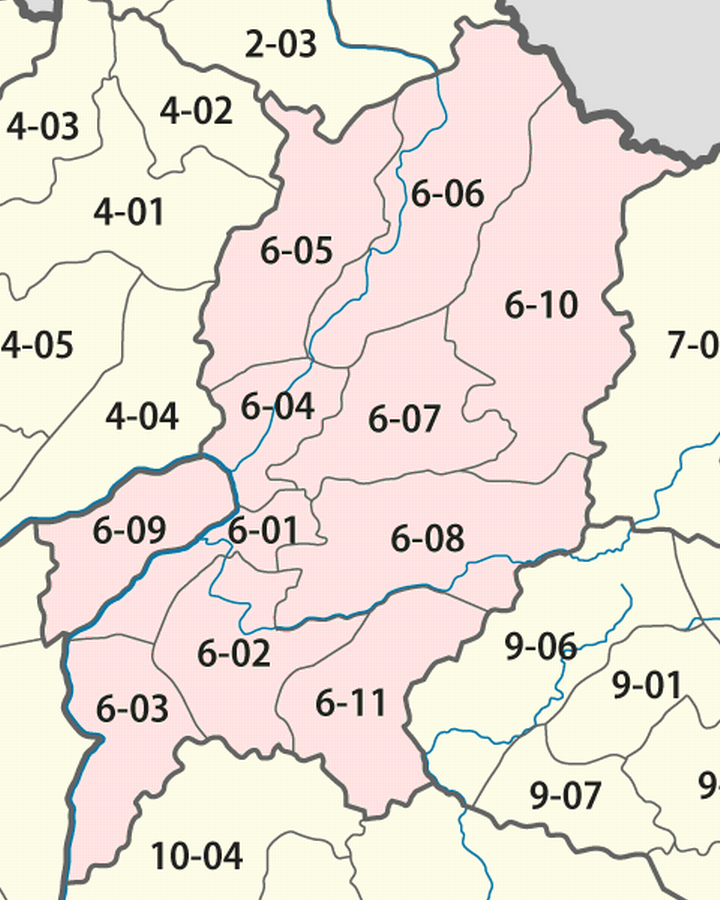
- Interactive map of Pak Ou district
- Country: Laos
- Province: Luang Prabang
- Time zone: UTC+7 (ICT)

Pak Ou is a district (muang) of Luang Prabang province in northern Laos.
