= Et district =

Et district ເມືອງແອດ
- District
- Interactive map of Et district
- Coordinates: 20.73°N 103.89°E
- Country: Laos
- Province: Houaphanh
- Time zone: UTC+7 (ICT)

Et is a district (muang) of Houaphanh province in northeastern Laos.
