= Viengkham District =

Viengkham district may refer to:

- Viengkham district, Luang Prabang, Laos
- Viengkham district, Vientiane, Laos
