= Beng district =

Beng district ເມືອງແບ່ງ
- District
- Interactive map of Beng district
- Coordinates: 20.37°N 101.73°E
- Country: Laos
- Province: Oudomxay

Population (2015)
  - Total: 37,491
- Time zone: UTC+7 (ICT)

Beng is a district (muang) of Oudomxay province in northwestern Laos.
