= Sop Bao district =

Sop Bao district ເມືອງສົບເບົາ
- District
- Interactive map of Sop Bao district
- Country: Laos
- Province: Houaphanh
- Time zone: UTC+7 (ICT)

Sop Bao is a district (muang) of Houaphanh province in northeastern Laos.
