= Nalae district =

Nalae ເມືອງນາແລ
- District
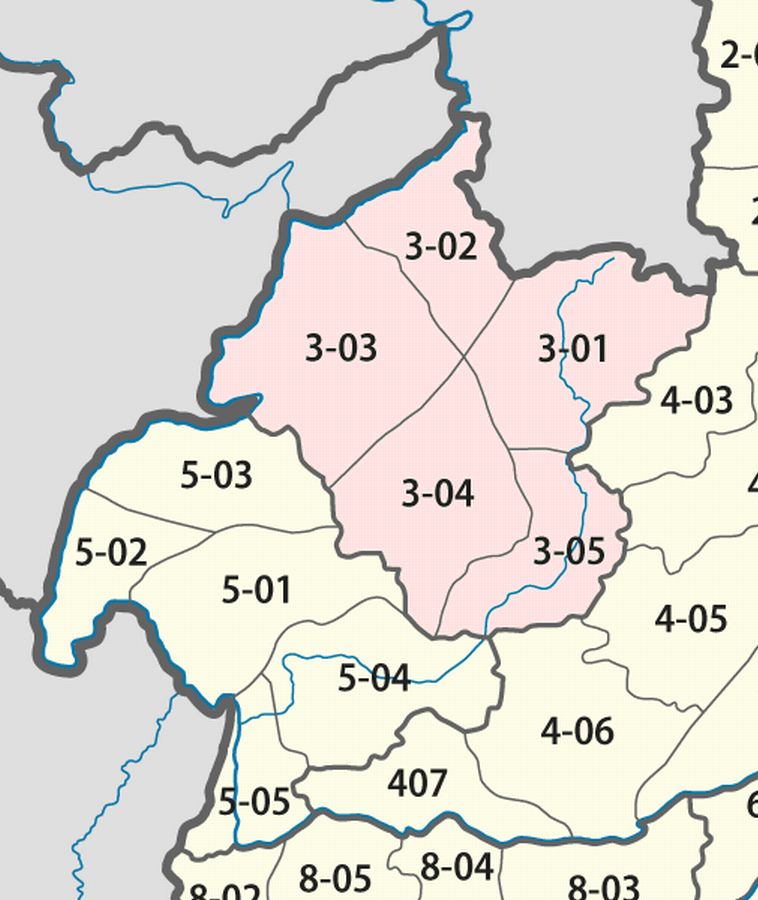
- Interactive map of Nalae
- Country: Laos
- Province: Luang Namtha province

Population (2015)
  - Total: 23,819
- Time zone: UTC+7 (ICT)

Nalae is a district (muang) of Luang Namtha province in northwestern Laos.
