= Phaxay district =

Coordinates: 19.26°N 103.09°E

Phaxay district ເມືອງຜາໄຊ
- District
- Interactive map of Phaxay district
- Country: Laos
- Province: Xiangkhouang
- Time zone: UTC+7 (ICT)

Phaxay is a district (muang) of Xiangkhouang province in north-central Laos.
