= Nong Bok district =

Coordinates: 17.081461°N 104.800515°E

Nong Bok district ເມືອງໜອງບົກ
- District
- Country: Laos
- Province: Khammouane
- Time zone: UTC+7 (ICT)

Nong Bok is a district (muang) of Khammouane province in mid-Laos.
