= Viengkham district, Luang Prabang =

Viengkham district ເມືອງວຽງຄຳ
- District
- Interactive map of Viengkham district
- Country: Laos
- Province: Luang Prabang
- Time zone: UTC+7 (ICT)

Viengkham District, Luang Prabang is a district (muang) of Luang Prabang province in northern Laos.
