= Xaisathan district =

- District
- Interactive map of Xaisathan district
- Coordinates: 19.39°N 101.36°E
- Country: Laos
- Province: Sainyabuli
- Time zone: UTC+7 (ICT)

Xaisathan is a district of Sainyabuli province, Laos.
