= Dak Cheung district =

Dak Cheung district ເມືອງດັກຈຶງ
- District
- Interactive map of Dak Cheung district
- Coordinates: 15.4°N 107.3°E
- Country: Laos
- Province: Sekong
- Time zone: UTC+7 (ICT)

Dak Cheung is a district (muang) of Sekong province in southeastern Laos.

== Governor ==
The District Governor of Dak Cheung District (2017) is Mr. Laysouane Midsouvanh (ໄລສວນ ມິດສຸວັນ).
