= Thongmyxay district =

Thongmyxay
- District
- Thongmyxay district
- Interactive map of Thongmyxay
- Coordinates: 18.411°N 101.168°E
- Country: Laos
- Province: Sainyabuli
- Time zone: UTC+7 (ICT)

Thongmyxay is a district of Sainyabuli province, Laos.
