= Subdistrict =

A subdistrict or sub-district is an administrative division that is generally smaller than a district.

== Equivalents ==
- Administrative posts of East Timor, formerly Portuguese-language subdistrito
- Kelurahan, in Indonesia
- Mukim, a township in Brunei, Indonesia, Malaysia, and Singapore
- Nahiyah, in Palestine and Syria
- Tambon, a township in Thailand
- Tehsil (also known as tehsil, taluka, circle, mandal or subdivision), an administrative unit in South Asia
- Mahakuma, a mid-level administrative division used in parts of South Asia

=== Translations ===
- Subdistricts of China (Chinese: 街道; pinyin: jiēdào), in mainland China, literally streets and avenues
- Subdistricts of Laos (Lao: ຕາແສງ, romanized: tasseng), an administrative unit in Laos
