= Thathom district =

- District
- Thathom district
- Location of Thathom district in Laos
- Country: Laos
- Province: Xaisomboun
- Time zone: UTC+7 (ICT)

Thathom is a district of Xaisomboun province, Laos.
