= Hom district =

Hom
- District
- Hom district
- Location of Hom district in Laos
- Country: Laos
- Province: Xaisomboun
- Time zone: UTC+7 (ICT)

Hom is a district of Xaisomboun province, Laos.
