= Phonthong district =

Phonthong district ເມືອງໂພນທອງ
- District
- Country: Laos
- Province: Champasak province
- Time zone: UTC+7 (ICT)

Phonthong is a district (muang) of Champasak province in southwestern Laos.

== Demographics ==
As per census 2020, Phonthong district has a population of 21,498. Of this, 10,824 are males and 10,675 females.
