= Dong Hua Sao National Park =

National park in Laos

- IUCN category VI (protected area with sustainable use of natural resources)
- Location within Laos
- Location: Champasak Province, Laos
- Nearest city: Pakse
- Coordinates: 15°3′32″N 106°39′11″E
- Area: 1,100 km^{2} (420 sq mi)
- Designated: 1993 national protected area, 2021 national park
- Governing body: Department of Forestry (DOF), Ministry of Agriculture and Forestry (MAF)

Dong Hua Sao National Protected Area is a national park in Champasak Province in southern Laos. This forested park rises from the Mekong river lowlands eastwards into the Bolaven Plateau. It is an ecotourism destination.

== Geography ==
Dong Hua Sao National Park is located about 30 kilometres (20 mi) east of Pakse and about 10 kilometres (10 mi) south of the town of Paksong in Paksong, Pathoumphone and Bachiangchaleunsouk districts. The park's area is 1,100 square kilometres (420 sq mi) including 300 square kilometres (120 sq mi) of wetlands. Elevations range from 100 metres (300 ft) in the west to about 1,000 metres (3,300 ft) on the Bolaven Plateau.

== History ==
Coffee growing was introduced to this area in the 1940s. In 1950 the Dong Hua Sao Forest Reserve was declared, covering 260 square kilometres (100 sq mi). Wartime migration of ethnic minorities from highland to lowland areas took place in the 1960s and 1970s. In the 1980s there was extensive logging in the area, some to establish coffee plantations. In 1993 Dong Hua Sao National Reserved Forest was declared, later renamed to Dong Hua Sao National Protected Area, covering an area of 1,100 square kilometres (420 sq mi). It was declared a national park in 2021.

== Flora and fauna ==
The park's main forest type is semidry evergreen forest. Upland forest is considered moist evergreen forest.

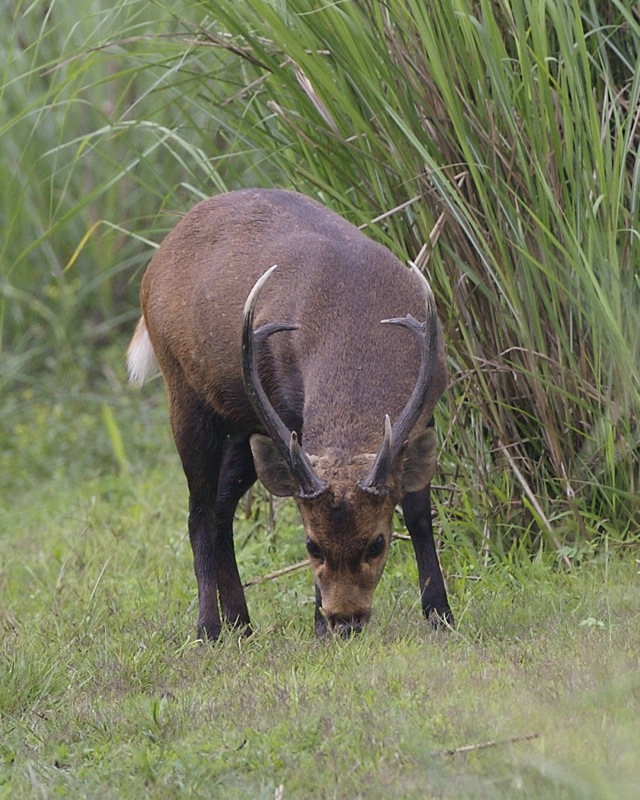
Male hog deer

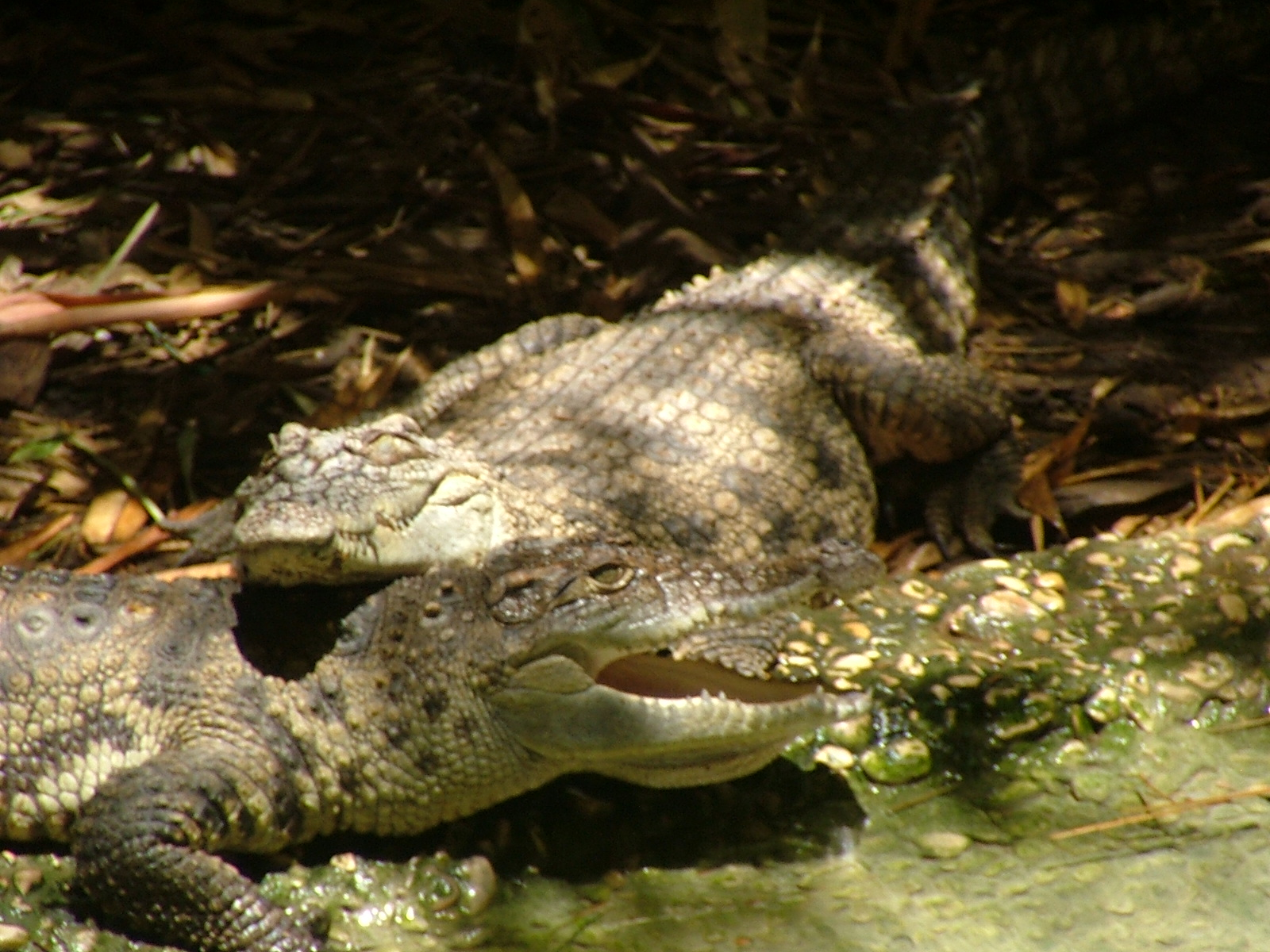
Siamese crocodiles

Animal species include the endangered yellow-cheeked gibbon. Wild elephants once roamed the area, but now only domesticated ones are found. Bird life includes the grey-faced tit-babbler, found only in Indochina, and rare hornbills. The wetlands are home to the Siamese crocodile, hog deer and green peafowl, all endangered.

== Threats ==
Dong Hua Sao National Park faces a number of environmental threats. The most significant is forest conversion for coffee plantations. Other threats include destructive fishing practices, hunting, overcollection of forest products and use of wetlands for agriculture and fisheries. The crocodiles of the wetlands face threats to their prey base from hunting and fishing.

== See also ==
- Protected areas of Laos
