= Soukhoumma district =

Soukhoumma district ເມືອງສຸຂຸມາ
- District
- Country: Laos
- Province: Champasak province
- Time zone: UTC+7 (ICT)

Soukhoumma District is a district (muang) of Champasak province in southwestern Laos.
