= Sangthong district =

Sangthong district ສັງທອງ Sangthong
- District
- Coordinates: 18°05′27″N 102°17′24″E
- Country: Laos
- Province: Vientiane Prefecture
- District: Sangthong

Population (2015)
  - District: 29,509
  - Urban: 5,962
- Time zone: UTC+7 (ICT)

Sangthong is a district of Vientiane Prefecture, Laos.
