= Chomphet district =

Coordinates: 19.8856°N 102.0808°E

Chomphet district ເມືອງຈອມເພັດ
- District
- Interactive map of Chomphet district
- Country: Laos
- Province: Luang Prabang
- Time zone: UTC+7 (ICT)

Chomphet is a district (muang) of Luang Prabang province in northern Laos.
