= Longxan district =

Longxan
- District
- Longxan district
- Location of Longxan district in Laos
- Country: Laos
- Province: Xaisomboun
- Time zone: UTC+7 (ICT)

Longxan is a district of Xaisomboun province, Laos.
