= National Biodiversity Conservation Area =

A National Biodiversity Conservation Area (NBCA) is an environmentally protected area in Laos. There are altogether 21 different NBCAs in Laos, protecting 29,775 square kilometers. Another 10 NBCAs have been proposed, the territory of many of them being treated by authorities as though they were already officially protected.

== List of NBCAs ==
- Corridor Nakai - Nam Theun and Phou Hin Poun National Biodiversity Conservation Area
- Dong Ampham National Biodiversity Conservation Area
- Dong Hua Sao National Protected Area
- Dong Phou Vieng National Protected Area
- Hin Nam No National Biodiversity Conservation Area
- Houei Nhang Conservation Area
- Khammouane Limestone National Biodiversity Conservation Area
- Nakai - Nam Theun National Biodiversity Conservation Area
- Nam Chuane Conservation Area
- Nam Et National Biodiversity Conservation Area
- Nam Ha National Protected Area
- Nam Kading National Protected Area
- Nam Kan
- Nam Phouy National Biodiversity Conservation Area
- Nam Theun Ext. National Biodiversity Conservation Area
- Nam Xam National Biodiversity Conservation Area
- Phou Den Din National Biodiversity Conservation Area
- Phou Kateup (Bolovens Northeast)
- Phou Kathong
- Phou Khao Khoay National Biodiversity Conservation Area
- Phou Louey National Biodiversity Conservation Area
- Phou Phanang National Biodiversity Conservation Area
- Phou Theung
- Phou Xang He National Protected Area
- Phou Xieng Thong National Protected Area
- Phu Luang (Boloven SW)
- Xe Bang Nouan National Biodiversity Conservation Area
- Xe Khampho
- Xe Pian National Protected Area
- Xe Xap National Biodiversity Conservation Area
- Xekhampo-Boloven Plateau Hunting Reserve

== See also ==
- Geography of Laos
