= Phiang district =

Phiang
- District
- Phiang district
- Country: Laos
- Province: Sainyabuli
- Time zone: UTC+7 (ICT)

Phiang is a district of Sainyabuli province, Laos.
