= Naxaithong district =

Naxaithong district ນາຊາຍທອງ Naxaithong
- District
- Map
- Location in Laos
- Coordinates: 18°04′56″N 102°31′28″E
- Country: Laos
- Province: Vientiane Prefecture
- District: Naxaithong

Population (2015)
  - District: 75,228
  - Urban: 36,184
- Time zone: UTC+7 (ICT)

Naxaithong is a rural district of Vientiane Prefecture, Laos.
