= Vapy district =

Vapy district ເມືອງວາປີ
- District
- Coordinates: 15°47′N 105°58′E
- Country: Laos
- Province: Salavan
- Time zone: UTC+7 (ICT)

Vapy is a district (muang) of Salavan province in southern Laos.
