= Toumlane district =

Toumlane district ເມືອງຕຸ້ມລານ
- District
- Country: Laos
- Province: Salavan
- Time zone: UTC+7 (ICT)

Toumlane is a district (muang) of Salavan province in southern Laos.
