= Pathouphone district =

Pathouphone district ເມືອງປະທຸມພອນ
- District
- Country: Laos
- Province: Champasak province
- Time zone: UTC+7 (ICT)

Pathoumphone District is a district (muang) of Champasak province in southwestern Laos.
