= Khop district =

- District
- Khop district
- Interactive map of Khop district
- Country: Laos
- Province: Sainyabuli
- Time zone: UTC+7 (ICT)

Khop is a district of Sainyabuli province, Laos.
