= Xon district =

Xon
- District
- Xon district
- Country: Laos
- Admin. division: Houaphanh province
- Time zone: UTC+7 (ICT)

Xon is a district of Houaphanh province, Laos.
