= Keo Oudom district =

- District
- Location of Keo Oudom district in Laos
- Country: Laos
- Province: Vientiane
- Time zone: UTC+7 (ICT)

Keo Oudom is a district of Vientiane province, Laos.
