= Feuang district =

- District
- Location of Feuang district in Laos
- Coordinates: 18.65°N 102.09°E
- Country: Laos
- Province: Vientiane
- Time zone: UTC+7 (ICT)

Feuang is a district of Vientiane province, Laos.
