= Kone district =

Kone
- District
- Kone district
- Country: Laos
- Admin. division: Houaphanh province
- Time zone: UTC+7 (ICT)

Kone is a district of Houaphanh province, Laos.
