= Sebangphay district =

Sebangphay district ເມືອງເຊບັ້ງໄຟ
- District
- Country: Laos
- Province: Khammouane
- Time zone: UTC+7 (ICT)

Sebangphay or Xebangfay is a district (muang) of Khammouane province in mid-Laos. The district was badly affected by floods caused by heavy rain in July 2011, affecting rice farmland in the district, inundating over 200 hectares. Floods occurred also in August 2014.
