= Vangvieng district =

Coordinates: 18.9130°N 102.4591°E

Vangvieng district ເມືອງວັງວຽງ
- District
- Location of Vangvieng district in Laos
- Country: Laos
- Province: Vientiane
- Time zone: UTC+7 (ICT)

Vangvieng is a district of Vientiane province, Laos.
