= Khongsedone district =

Khongsedone district ເມືອງຄົງເຊໂດນ
- District
- Coordinates: 15°34′N 105°47′E
- Country: Laos
- Province: Salavan
- Time zone: UTC+7 (ICT)

Khongsedone is a district (muang) of Salavan province in southern Laos.
