= Kasy district =

Kasy district ເມືອງກາສີ
- District
- Location of Kasy district in Laos
- Country: Laos
- Province: Vientiane
- Time zone: UTC+7 (ICT)

Kasy is a district of Vientiane province, Laos.
