= Ta Oy district =

Ta Oy district ເມືອງຕະໂອ້ຍ
- District
- Coordinates: 16°3′N 106°35′E
- Country: Laos
- Province: Salavan
- Time zone: UTC+7 (ICT)

Ta Oy is a district (muang) of Salavan province in southern Laos.
