= Kenethao district =

- District
- Kenethao district
- Location within Laos
- Country: Laos
- Province: Sainyabuli

Population (2020)
  - Total: 42,930
- Time zone: UTC+7 (ICT)

Kenethao is a district of Sainyabuli province, Laos.
