= Meun district =

- District
- Location of Meun district in Laos
- Country: Laos
- Province: Vientiane
- Time zone: UTC+7 (ICT)

Meun is a district of Vientiane province, Laos.
