= Xanakharm district =

- District
- Location of Xanakharm district in Laos
- Coordinates: 18.12°N 101.59°E
- Country: Laos
- Province: Vientiane
- Time zone: UTC+7 (ICT)

Xanakharm is a district of Vientiane province, Laos.
