= Batiengchaleunsouk district =

Batiengchaleunsouk district ເມືອງບາຈຽງຈະເລີນສຸກ
- District
- Coordinates: 15.25°N 105.95°E
- Country: Laos
- Province: Champasak province
- Time zone: UTC+7 (ICT)

Batiengchaleunsouk (Lao: ເມືອງບາຈຽງຈະເລີນສຸກ, pronounced [ba.tɕieŋ tɕa.lɤːn suk]) is a district (muang) of Champasak province in southwestern Laos.
