= Thoulakhom district =

Thoulakhom district ເມືອງທຸລະຄົມ
- District
- Location of Thoulakhom district in Laos
- Country: Laos
- Province: Vientiane
- Time zone: UTC+7 (ICT)

Thoulakhom is a district of Vientiane province, Laos.
