= Ngeun district =

- District
- Ngeun district
- Interactive map of Ngeun district
- Country: Laos
- Province: Sainyabuli
- Time zone: UTC+7 (ICT)

Ngeun is a district of Sainyabuli province, Laos.
