= Hiam district =

Hiam
- District
- Hiam district
- Interactive map of Hiam
- Coordinates: 20.06°N 103.34°E
- Country: Laos
- Admin. division: Houaphanh province
- Time zone: UTC+7 (ICT)

Hiam is a district of Houaphanh province, Laos.
