= Districts of Laos =

Districts (Lao: ເມືອງ, mueang) are divided from 17 provinces (Lao: ແຂວງ, khoueng) and 1 prefecture (kampheng nakhon), or capital city municipality (ນະຄອນຫຼວງ, nakhon luang) of Laos.

== List ==
Districts of Laos

Note — Each district has a code in parentheses displaying the first two digits as the province and the last two as the district representing that province.

No.	District	Name in Lao	Province
1-01	Chanthabuly District (Urban Vientiane)	ເມືອງຈັນທະບູລີ	Vientiane Prefecture
1-02	Sikhottabong District (Urban Vientiane)	ເມືອງສີໂຄດຕະບອງ	Vientiane Prefecture
1-03	Xaysetha District (Urban Vientiane)	ເມືອງໄຊເສດຖາ	Vientiane Prefecture
1-04	Sisattanak District (Urban Vientiane)	ເມືອງສີສັດຕະນາກ	Vientiane Prefecture
1-05	Naxaithong District	ເມືອງນາຊາຍທອງ	Vientiane Prefecture
1-06	Xaythany District	ເມືອງໄຊທານີ	Vientiane Prefecture
1-07	Hadxayfong District (Urban Vientiane)	ເມືອງຫາດຊາຍຟອງ	Vientiane Prefecture
1-08	Sangthong district	ເມືອງສັງທອງ	Vientiane Prefecture
1-09	Mayparkngum district	ເມືອງປາກງື່ມ	Vientiane Prefecture
2-01	Phongsaly District	ເມືອງຜົ້ງສາລີ	Phongsaly Province
2-02	May District	ເມືອງໃໝ່	Phongsaly Province
2-03	Khoua District	ເມືອງຂວາ	Phongsaly Province
2-04	Samphanh District	ເມືອງສຳພັນ	Phongsaly Province
2-05	Boun Neua District	ເມືອງບຸນເໜືອ	Phongsaly Province
2-06	Yot Ou District	ເມືອງຍອດອູ	Phongsaly Province
2-07	Boun Tay District	ເມືອງບຸນໃຕ້	Phongsaly Province
3-01	Namtha District	ເມືອງຫຼວງນໍ້າທາ	Luang Namtha Province
3-02	Sing District	ເມືອງສີງ	Luang Namtha Province
3-03	Long District	ເມືອງລອງ	Luang Namtha Province
3-04	Viengphoukha District	ເມືອງວຽງພູຄາ	Luang Namtha Province
3-05	Na Le District	ເມືອງນາແລ	Luang Namtha Province
4-01	Xay District	ເມືອງໄຊ	Oudomxay Province
4-02	La District	ເມືອງຫຼາ	Oudomxay Province
4-03	Na Mo District	ເມືອງນາໝໍ້	Oudomxay Province
4-04	Nga District	ເມືອງງາ	Oudomxay Province
4-05	Beng District	ເມືອງແບ່ງ	Oudomxay Province
4-06	Houne District	ເມືອງຮຸນ	Oudomxay Province
4-07	Pak Beng District	ເມືອງປາກແບ່ງ	Oudomxay Province
5-01	Houayxay District	ເມືອງຫ້ວຍຊາຍ	Bokeo Province
5-02	Ton Pheung District	ເມືອງຕົ້ນເຜິ້ງ	Bokeo Province
5-03	Meung District	ເມືອງເມິງ	Bokeo Province
5-04	Pha Oudom District	ເມືອງຜາອຸດົມ	Bokeo Province
5-05	Pak Tha District	ເມືອງປາກທາ	Bokeo Province
6-01	Luang Prabang District	ເມືອງຫຼວງພະບາງ	Luang Prabang Province
6-02	Xiengngeun District	ເມືອງຊຽງເງິນ	Luang Prabang Province
6-03	Nane District	ເມືອງນານ	Luang Prabang Province
6-04	Pak Ou District	ເມືອງປາກອູ	Luang Prabang Province
6-05	Nam Bak District	ເມືອງນ້ຳບາກ	Luang Prabang Province
6-06	Ngoy District	ເມືອງງອຍ	Luang Prabang Province
6-07	Pak Seng District	ເມືອງປາກແຊງ	Luang Prabang Province
6-08	Phonxay District	ເມືອງໂພນໄຊ	Luang Prabang Province
6-09	Chomphet District	ເມືອງຈອມເພັດ	Luang Prabang Province
6-10	Viengkham District	ເມືອງວຽງຄຳ	Luang Prabang Province
6-11	Phoukhoune District	ເມືອງພູຄູນ	Luang Prabang Province
6-12	Phonthong District	ເມືອງໂພນທອງ	Luang Prabang Province
7-01	Xam Neua District	ເມືອງຊຳເໜືອ	Houaphanh Province
7-02	Xiengkho District	ເມືອງຊຽງຄໍ້	Houaphanh Province
7-03	Hiam District	ເມືອງວຽງທອງ	Houaphanh Province
7-04	Viengxay District	ເມືອງວຽງໄຊ	Houaphanh Province
7-05	Houameuang District	ເມືອງຫົວເມືອງ	Houaphanh Province
7-06	Samtay District	ເມືອງຊຳໃຕ້	Houaphanh Province
7-07	Sop Bao District	ເມືອງສົບເບົາ	Houaphanh Province
7-08	Et District	ເມືອງແອດ	Houaphanh Province
7-09	Kone District	ເມືອງກອັນ	Houaphanh Province
7-10	Xon District	ເມືອງຊ່ອນ	Houaphanh Province
8-01	Sainyabuli District	ເມືອງໄຊຍະບູລີ	Sainyabuli Province
8-02	Khop District	ເມືອງຄອບ	Sainyabuli Province
8-03	Hongsa District	ເມືອງຫົງສາ	Sainyabuli Province
8-04	Ngeun District	ເມືອງເງິນ	Sainyabuli Province
8-05	Xienghone District	ເມືອງຊຽງຮ່ອນ	Sainyabuli Province
8-06	Phiang District	ເມືອງພຽງ	Sainyabuli Province
8-07	Parklai District	ເມືອງປາກລາຍ	Sainyabuli Province
8-08	Kenethao District	ເມືອງແກ່ນທ້າວ	Sainyabuli Province
8-09	Botene District	ເມືອງບໍ່ແຕນ	Sainyabuli Province
8-10	Thongmyxay District	ເມືອງທົ່ງມີໄຊ	Sainyabuli Province
8-11	Xaisathan District	ເມືອງໄຊສະຖານ	Sainyabuli Province
9-01	Pek District	ເມືອງແປກ	Xiangkhouang Province
9-02	Kham District	ເມືອງຄຳ	Xiangkhouang Province
9-03	Nong Het District	ເມືອງໜອງແຮດ	Xiangkhouang Province
9-04	Khoune District	ເມືອງຄູນ	Xiangkhouang Province
9-05	Mok May District	ເມືອງໝອກໃໝ່	Xiangkhouang Province
9-06	Phou Kout District	ເມືອງພູກູດ	Xiangkhouang Province
9-07	Phaxay District	ເມືອງຜາໄຊ	Xiangkhouang Province
10-01	Phonhong District	ເມືອງໂພນໂຮງ	Vientiane Province
10-02	Thoulakhom District	ເມືອງທຸລະຄົມ	Vientiane Province
10-03	Keo Oudom District	ເມືອງແກ້ວອຸດົມ	Vientiane Province
10-04	Kasy District	ເມືອງກາສີ	Vientiane Province
10-05	Vangvieng District	ເມືອງວັງວຽງ	Vientiane Province
10-06	Feuang District	ເມືອງເຟືອງ	Vientiane Province
10-07	Xanakharm District	ເມືອງຊະນະຄາມ	Vientiane Province
10-08	Mad District	ເມືອງແມດ	Vientiane Province
10-09	Viengkham District	ເມືອງວຽງຄໍາ	Vientiane Province
10-10	Hinhurp District	ເມືອງຫີນເຫີບ	Vientiane Province
10-11	Meun District	ເມືອງໝື່ນ	Vientiane Province
11-01	Pakxan District	ເມືອງປາກຊັນ	Bolikhamsai Province
11-02	Thaphabat District	ເມືອງທ່າພະບາດ	Bolikhamsai Province
11-03	Pakkading District	ເມືອງປາກກະດິງ	Bolikhamsai Province
11-04	Borikhane District	ເມືອງບໍລິຄັນ	Bolikhamsai Province
11-05	Khamkeut District	ເມືອງຄຳເກີດ	Bolikhamsai Province
11-06	Viengthong District	ເມືອງວຽງທອງ	Bolikhamsai Province
11-07	Xaichamphon District	ເມືອງໄຊຈຳພອນ	Bolikhamsai Province
12-01	Thakhek District	ເມືອງທ່າແຂກ	Khammouane Province
12-02	Mahaxay District	ເມືອງມະຫາໄຊ	Khammouane Province
12-03	Nong Bok District	ເມືອງໜອງບົກ	Khammouane Province
12-04	Hineboune District	ເມືອງຫີນບູນ	Khammouane Province
12-05	Yommalath District	ເມືອງຍົມມະລາດ	Khammouane Province
12-06	Boualapha District	ເມືອງບົວລະພາ	Khammouane Province
12-07	Nakai District	ມືອງນາກາຍ	Khammouane Province
12-08	Sebangphay District	ເມືອງເຊບັ້ງໄຟ	Khammouane Province
12-09	Xaibouathong District	ເມືອງໄຊບົວທອງ	Khammouane Province
12-10	Kounkham District	ເມືອງຄູນຄຳ	Khammouane Province
13-01	Kaysone Phomvihane District	ເມືອງໄກສອນ ພົມວິຫານ	Savannakhet Province
13-02	Outhoumphone District	ເມືອງອຸທຸມພອນ	Savannakhet Province
13-03	Atsaphangthong District	ເມືອງອາດສະພັງທອງ	Savannakhet Province
13-04	Phine District	ເມືອງພີນ	Savannakhet Province
13-05	Seponh District	ເມືອງເຊໂປນ	Savannakhet Province
13-06	Nong District	ເມືອງນອງ	Savannakhet Province
13-07	Thapangthong District	ເມືອງທ່າປາງທອງ	Savannakhet Province
13-08	Songkhone District	ເມືອງສອງຄອນ	Savannakhet Province
13-09	Champhone District	ເມືອງຈຳພອນ	Savannakhet Province
13-10	Xonaboury District	ເມືອງຊົນນະບູລີ	Savannakhet Province
13-11	Xayboury District	ເມືອງໄຊບູລີ	Savannakhet Province
13-12	Viraboury District	ເມືອງວີລະບຸລີ	Savannakhet Province
13-13	Assaphone District	ເມືອງອາດສະພອນ	Savannakhet Province
13-14	Xonboury District	ເມືອງໄຊພູທອງ	Savannakhet Province
13-15	Thaphalanxay District	ເມືອງພະລານໄຊ	Savannakhet Province
14-01	Saravane District	ເມືອງສາລະວັນ	Salavan Province
14-02	Ta Oy District	ເມືອງຕະໂອ້ຍ	Salavan Province
14-03	Toumlane District	ເມືອງຕຸ້ມລານ	Salavan Province
14-04	Lakhonepheng District	ເມືອງລະຄອນເພັງ	Salavan Province
14-05	Vapy District	ເມືອງວາປີ	Salavan Province
14-06	Khongsedone District	ເມືອງຄົງເຊໂດນ	Salavan Province
14-07	Lao Ngam District	ເມືອງເລົ່າງາມ	Salavan Province
14-08	Sa Mouay District	ເມືອງສະມ້ວຍ	Salavan Province
15-01	La Mam District	ເມືອງລະມາມ	Sekong Province
15-02	Kaleum District	ເມືອງກະເລິມ	Sekong Province
15-03	Dak Cheung District	ເມືອງດາກຈຶງ	Sekong Province
15-04	Tha Teng District	ເມືອງທ່າແຕງ	Sekong Province
16-01	Pakse District	ເມືອງປາກເຊ	Champasak Province
16-02	Sanasomboun District	ເມືອງຊະນະສົມບູນ	Champasak Province
16-03	Batiengchaleunsouk District	ເມືອງບາຈຽງຈະເລີນສຸກ	Champasak Province
16-04	Paksong District	ເມືອງປາກຊ່ອງ	Champasak Province
16-05	Pathouphone District	ເມືອງປະທຸມພອນ	Champasak Province
16-06	Phonthong District	ເມືອງໂພນທອງ	Champasak Province
16-07	Champassack District	ເມືອງຈຳປາສັກ	Champasak Province
16-08	Soukhoumma District	ເມືອງສຸຂຸມາ	Champasak Province
16-09	Mounlapamok District	ເມືອງມູນລະປະໂມກ	Champasak Province
16-10	Khong District	ເມືອງໂຂງ	Champasak Province
17-01	Saysetha District	ເມືອງໄຊເຊດຖາ	Attapeu Province
17-02	Samakkhixay District	ເມືອງສາມັກຄີໄຊ	Attapeu Province
17-03	Sanamxay District	ເມືອງສະໜາມໄຊ	Attapeu Province
17-04	Sanxay District	ເມືອງສານໄຊ	Attapeu Province
17-05	Phouvong District	ເມືອງພູວົງ	Attapeu Province
18-01	Anouvong District	ເມືອງອະນຸວົງ	Xaisomboun Province
18-02	Longchaeng District	ເມືອງລ້ອງແຈ້ງ	Xaisomboun Province
18-03	Longxan District	ເມືອງລ້ອງຊານ	Xaisomboun Province
18-04	Hom District	ເມືອງເມືອງຮົ່ມ	Xaisomboun Province
18-05	Thathom District	ເມືອງທ່າໂທມ	Xaisomboun Province
