= Viengkham district, Vientiane =

Viengkham district
- District
- Location of Viengkham district in Laos
- Country: Laos
- Province: Vientiane
- Time zone: UTC+7 (ICT)

Viengkham, also spelled Viang Kham, is a district of Vientiane province, Laos.

== History ==
The district is the location of the ancient walled city of Viengkham. It was regarded as Vientiane's twin city and was as significant as Vientiane in historic times, being mentioned in the Ram Khamhaeng Inscription and in the story of Fa Ngum.
