= Xienghone district =

Xienghone
- District
- Xienghone district
- Interactive map of Xienghone
- Country: Laos
- Province: Sainyabuli
- Time zone: UTC+7 (ICT)

Xienghone is a district of Sainyabuli province, Laos.
