= Xaibouathong district =

Xaibouathong district ເມືອງໄຊບົວທອງ Thong
- District
- Coordinates: 17°10′N 105°33′E
- Country: Laos
- Province: Khammouane
- Time zone: UTC+7 (ICT)

Xaibouathong or Saybouathong is a district (muang) of Khammouane province in mid-Laos.
