= Katang people =

Ethnic group in Laos

Katang
Total population
- 144,255 (2015)

Regions with significant populations
- Laos

Languages
- Bru, Ta'Oi, Lao

Religion
- Animism, Theravada Buddhism

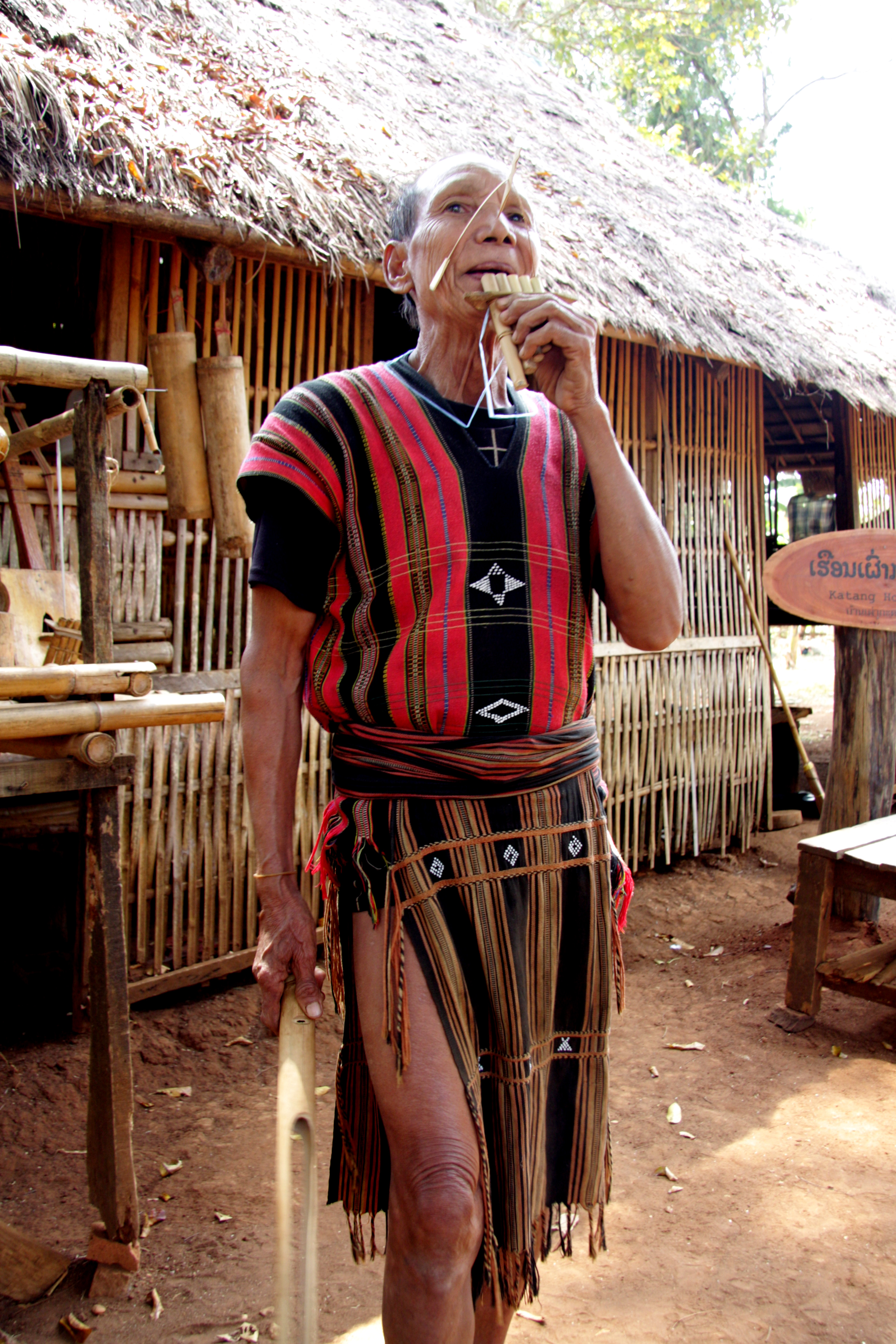
A Katang man in Laos.

The Katang (Kataang) (Lao: ຊົນເຜົ່າກະຕາງ; pronounced [kā.tàːŋ]) are an ethnic group predominantly living in Laos. A few live elsewhere in Southeast Asia. In 2015 there were 144,255 living in Laos, making them one of the largest subgroups of the Lao Theung and one of the largest true ethnic groups in the country. Most live in the southern provinces of Savannakhet, Saravan, and Champasak.

== Culture ==
They are one of the few Lao Theung people that do not live in houses on stilts or in trees, but rather in long wooden houses. Whenever a Katang man marries a woman, he will add a room to the house for his new family. One of these wooden longhouses is 328 feet long and tourists can still see it just north of Saravan City.

Another old Katang tradition for both men and women is to pierce their ears and put a bamboo tube in the hole to stretch out their lobes. This tradition has all but died out.

The Katang engage in crop rotation as their common agricultural practice. Many Katang also engage in irrigation and slash-and-burn agriculture.

Most Katang follow old ethnic beliefs and many people who do this also follow Buddhism. Some Buddhist festivals are commonly celebrated by the Katang. Traditional Katang animism includes a belief in many forest spirits and many taboos meant to avoid disturbing them have developed over the centuries. One of the most revered spirits includes the house spirit which is said to inhabit every house.
