= Provinces of Laos =

Provinces ແຂວງ Khoeng
- Category: Unitary state
- Location: Lao People's Democratic Republic
- Number: 17 (plus one prefecture)
- Populations: In 2023 this ranged from 116,800 (for Xaisomboun province) to 1,117,500 (for Savannakhét province)
- Areas: 3,920 km^{2} (1,510 sq mi) (for Vientiane Prefecture) to 21,774 km^{2} (8,407 sq mi) (for Savannakhét province)
- Subdivisions: District (muang)

Laos is divided into 17 provinces (Lao ແຂວງ, pronounced [kʰwɛ̌ːŋ], khwaeng, khoeng, qwang or khoueng) and one prefecture, the latter including the Vientiane capital city municipality (ນະຄອນຫຼວງ, nakhon luang, or Na Kone Luang Vientiane). The special administrative zone (ເຂດພິເສດ, khet phiset), Xaisomboun, created in 1994, was dissolved on 13 January 2006. However on 31 December 2013 Xaisômboun was restored as a province.

== List ==

Location	Name	Capital	Pop'n (mid 2023 estimate)	Area (km^{2})	Pop'n density	ISO
	Attapeu province	Samakkhixay District (Attapeu)	167,000	10,320	16	LA-AT
	Bokeo province	Houayxay District (Ban Houayxay)	213,300	6,196	34	LA-BK
	Bolikhamxai province	Pakxan District (Pakxan)	330,700	14,863	22	LA-BL
	Champasak province	Pakse District (Pakse)	781,200	15,415	51	LA-CH
	Houaphanh province	Xam Neua District (Xam Neua)	317,100	16,500	19	LA-HO
	Khammouane province	Thakhek District (Thakhek)	451,300	16,315	28	LA-KH
	Luang Namtha province	Namtha District (Luang Namtha)	208,900	9,325	22	LA-LM
	Luang Prabang province	Luang Prabang (Luang Prabang)	477,700	16,875	28	LA-LP
	Oudomxay province	Xay District (Muang Xay)	360,800	15,370	23	LA-OU
	Phongsaly province	Phongsaly District (Phongsali)	197,600	16,270	12	LA-PH
	Salavan province	Salavan District (Salavan)	464,800	10,691	43	LA-SL
	Savannakhet province	Khanthaboury District (Savannakhet)	1,117,500	21,774	51	LA-SV
	Vientiane province	Phonhong District (Phonhong)	479,400	15,610	31	LA-VI
	Vientiane Prefecture	Vientiane	1,009,300	3,920	257	LA-VT
	Sainyabuli province	Xayabury District (Sainyabuli)	439,400	16,389	27	LA-XA
	Sekong province	La Mam District (Sekong)	136,700	7,665	18	LA-XE
	Xaisomboun province	Anouvong District (Ban Mouang Cha)	116,800	8,551	14	LA-XS
	Xiangkhouang province	Pek District (Phonsavan)	274,400	14,751	19	LA-XI

=== Population ===
The population of each province in 2015 was 6,492,228 according to the Census returns, but was increased by 2.76% to 6,671,680 to allow for the calculated under-enumeration. The population of Laos in 2023 is 7,545,800 as given in the official projections for mid 2023.

== See also ==
- List of provinces of Laos by Human Development Index
- ISO 3166-2:LA
