= Time in Laos =

Time zones used in the Lao People's Democratic Republic

In Laos, Indochina Time (ICT) (UTC+07:00) is used as the standard time zone, sharing it with Cambodia, Thailand, Vietnam, and western Indonesia. Daylight saving time is not observed.

The Golden Triangle Special Economic Zone in the north-west of the country observes Beijing Time (UTC+08:00) due to the area's heavy mainland Chinese influence.

== See also ==
- List of time zones
- ASEAN Common Time
- Six-hour clock
- Buddhist Era
