= Muang Sing =

Muang Sing ເມືອງສິງ Muang Sing
- District & municipality
- Sing District
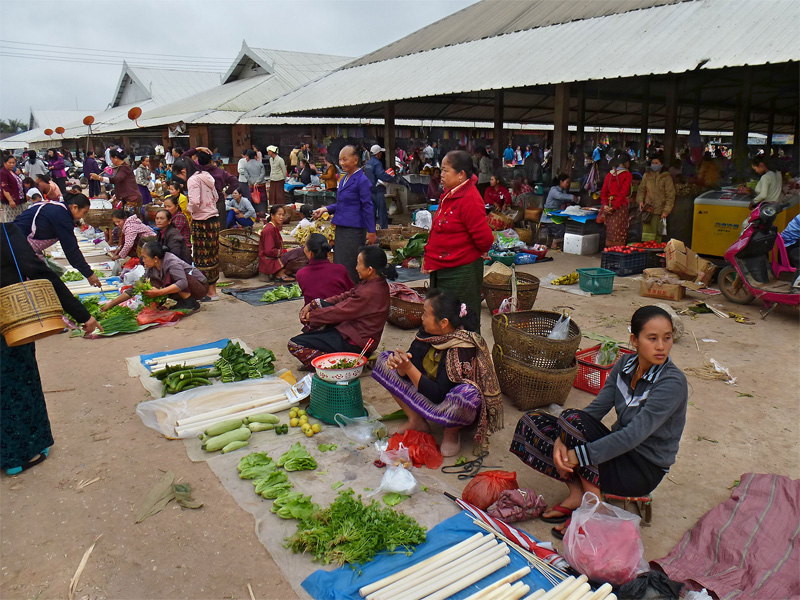
- Muang Sing market, formerly a major opium market in the Golden Triangle

- Location within Laos
- Coordinates: 21°12′N 101°9′E
- Country: Laos
- Province: Luang Namtha
- Established: 1792

Area
  - Total: 1,650 km^{2} (640 sq mi)

Population (2000)
  - Total: 23,500
  - Density: 14.2/km^{2} (37/sq mi)
- In the district
- Time zone: UTC+7 (ICT)

Muang Sing (Mueang Sing) (Lao: ເມືອງສິງ, pronounced [mɯ́aŋ sǐŋ]) is a small town and district (muang) in Luang Namtha Province, northwestern Laos, about 60 kilometres northwest of the town of Luang Namtha and 360 kilometres northwest of Vientiane. It lies very close to the border with Yunnan, China, surrounded by mountains and rivers. Historically, Muang Sing has been a major producer of opium and still has problems with drugs and smuggling, due to its proximity to China and Myanmar.

== History ==
Not much is known about the history of the town before the 18th century. A walled settlement named Wiang Fa Ya was founded by the widow of the ruler of Chiang Khaeng and in 1792 she ordered the construction of a large stupa. The district of Muang Sing was the subject of a border dispute between the French and British for decades. The French set up a garrison here in 1896. Muang Sing was never formally incorporated into the kingdom of Xishuangbanna in the late-19th century and the ruler of Muang Sing, Chao Fa Sirinor, ruled the area as a semi-autonomous principality in the late 19th century. In 1885, Sirinor moved the capital of his Lue principality of Chiang Khaeng to Muang Sing, several kilometres to the southeast, bringing with him some 1000 Lue people. Because of its important position geographically, the people of the town have historically been on better terms with the Burmese, Thai, and Chinese people than the rest of Laos. However, it has continued to attract Lue pilgrims to its reliquary festival from Xishuangbanna since at least World War II due to its past.

In 1904, Muang Sing was incorporated in French Laos after France and Great Britain made an agreement. In 1907, the Governor-General of Indochina in Hanoi issued a decree to establish the post of a "delegue du Commissaire du Gouvernement" at Muang Sing. It became part of French Indochina in 1916, but the locals continued to show discontent with the French occupation. In the first half of the 20th century, the French capitalized on the location of the town by using it as a weigh station and market to regulate their opium monopoly, Opium Regie, and control production by the Hmong and Mien peoples. By World War II, some 15% of the colonial revenue of the French was obtained through opium trading. When changes in the international situation after the war blocked off many historical trading routes, the French government encouraged Hmong farmers to mass-produce the poppies by some 800% to compete and maintain their monopoly. In 1953, however, Laos became independent from France and trading declined until the 1990s, when the opening of the country to tourism saw many people arriving in the area to smoke opium, leading to the reopening of drug dens.

== Geography and climate ==
Muang Sing is in northwestern Laos in the northern part of Luang Namtha Province. The town lies about 60 kilometres northwest of the town of Luang Namtha, 77 kilometres northeast by road from Xieng Kok on the Burmese border and about 360 kilometres northwest of Vientiane. The district, which has jurisdiction over about 95 villages, borders Muang Long to the west and Muang Namtha to the east and Yunnan, China to the north. The district covers an area of 1650 km^{2}, has a population of about 23,500 as of 2000 and a population density of 14.2 persons per km^{2}. The terrain ranges in elevation from 540 metres in the lowlands to 2,094 metres in the highlands. Muang Namtha forms a valley of the same name with dramatic mountain scenery. Roughly half of the district lies in the Namtha National Biodiversity Conservation Area, also known as Nam Ha National Protected Area, a heavily forested area under national protection which extends much further to the southwest and includes the Pha Yueng Waterfall, about 17 kilometres south of the town of Muang Sing. The confluence of Nam Dai, Nam Sing and Nam Yuan is just to the northeast of the town of Muang Sing.

Due to its mountainous location at around 700 metres on average, its weather can be cool, rarely exceeding 30 degrees in the hottest part of the year in March–April and dropping to as low as zero degrees Celsius in the coldest months, December–January. The monsoon season falls between May and October.

=== Villages ===
A selection of most of the villages in the district. All of the names, with the exception of the final three, often have "Ban" in front of them.

- Bonghet
- Cha Kanta (21.366682 N 101.050000 E)
- Chaphouma
- Chiangmoun
- Chom
- Douthan
- Houanamkeo
- Houana-Nua
- Houana-Tai
- Houaykaem
- Houaykot
- Houayla-Kao
- Houayla-Mai
- Houay Long
- Houaylong
- Houaylong-Kao
- Houaylong-Mai
- Imlakhili
- Keolouang
- Keo-Noy
- Khouang
- Koloung
- Koum
- Lacha (21°10'0"N 101°16'0"E)
- Lacha (21°7'0"N 101°10'0"E)
- Lan Tene
- Lonthen
- Meo
- Mouang
- Mouanghoun
- Muangmon
- Na
- Nakbon
- Namday
- Namdekloung
- Namhou
- Namma
- Nongkham
- Nongngeun
- Nongngeun-Noy
- Oua
- Ouan
- Patouay
- Pavay-Kao
- Pavay-Mai
- Phalat-Noy
- Phatat
- Phaya Kham Ping
- Phou Van
- Pia Nam Khine
- San
- Sanchanta
- Sang Mie
- Sene Kanta
- Sen-En
- Sene Phan Muong
- Silihuang
- Silimoun
- Sine Kame
- Sing
- Sop-I (1)
- Sop-I (2)
- Sop-I-Kao
- Suadeng
- Suakhao-Nua
- Suakhao-Tai
- Ta
- Tami-Kao
- Tapao
- Texa
- Thong-Mai
- Tia Kamla
- Tinthat (21°9'22"N 101°10'3"E)
- Tinthat (21°2'7"N 101°'30"E)
- Tinthat-Noy
- Tonpouay
- Xam
- Xay
- Xiangkheng
- Xieng Yun
- Yangpeng
- Yao
- Muang Sing (capital)
- Muong Moune
- Pang Kalom

== Demographics ==
There are over nine minority groups in Muang Sing District. As of 2000 there were some 68 Akha villages, 26 Tai Lue villages, five Tai Neua villages, five Yao villages, three Hmong villages and one Tai Dam village in the district. These ethnic groups are classified in terms of elevation such as Lao lum (lowland Lao) and Lao sung (highland Lao). There are also many ethnic Yunnanese people in the area, mainly traders. The Akha which comprise about 45%, speak Tibeto-Burman languages and are mostly found in the rural parts of the district, especially the hills, and the Tai Lu, 30% of the people, form the largest ethnic group living in the main town.

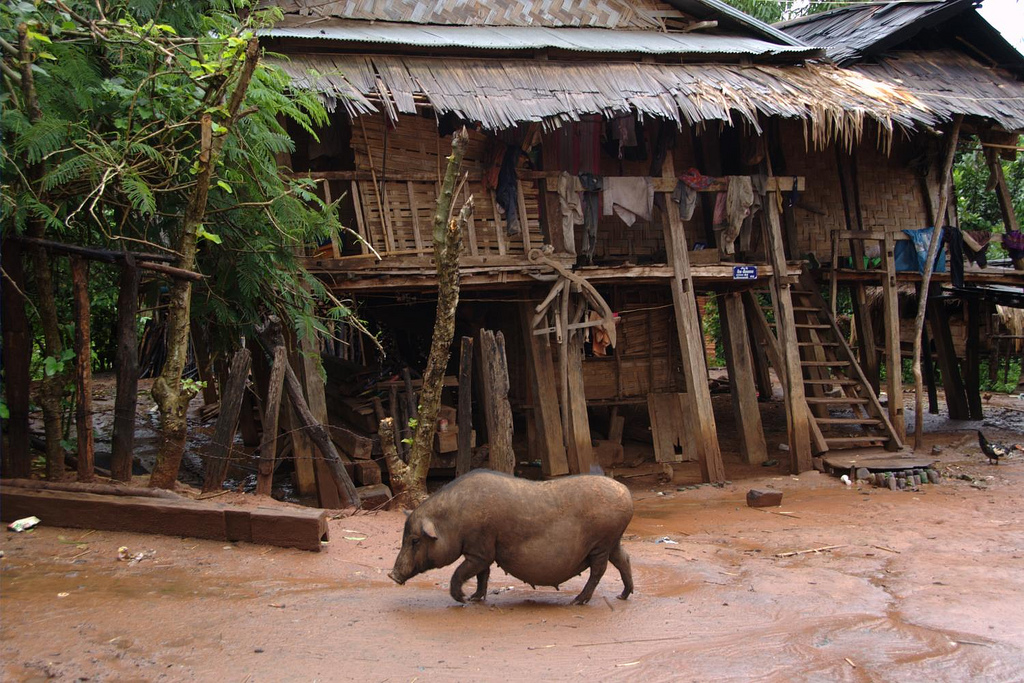
Rural Akha house

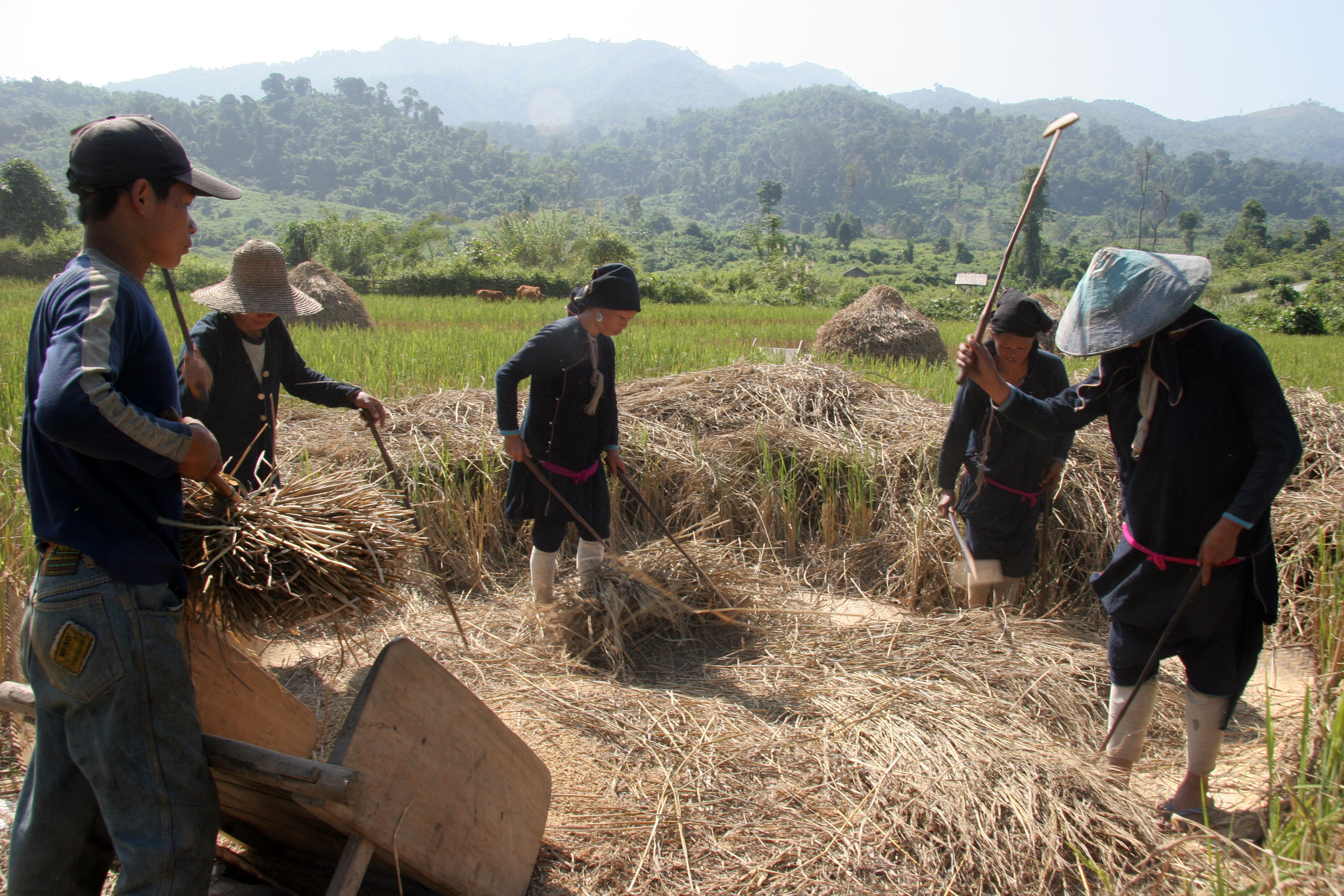
Lanten people harvesting

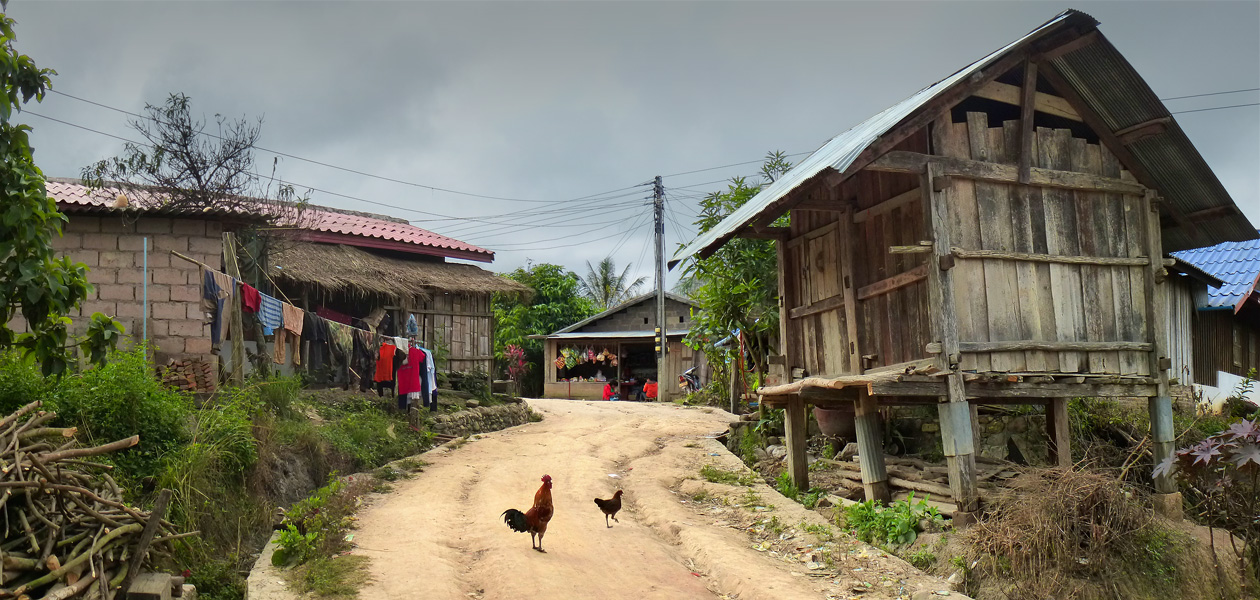
Ban Nam May, a Yao village

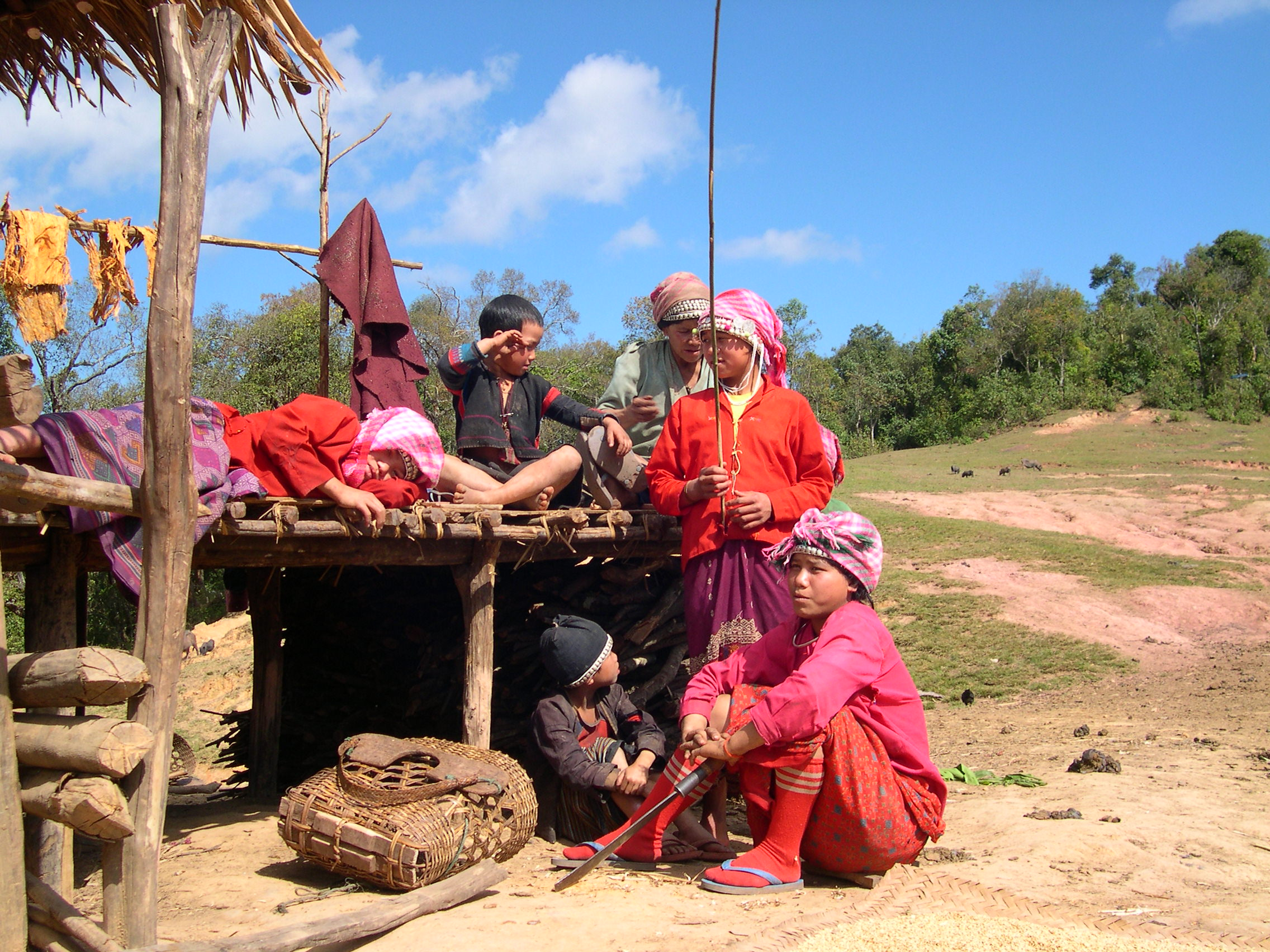
Locals in rural Muang Sing

== Economy ==
The district has a history of drug trading from at least French colonial times as it is a key transit point for smuggling, lying on a road (known as Opium Road) which connects to Burma and to the Chinese town of Zaho, passing through Oudomxay and Botom. The area is part of what is known as the Golden Triangle, one of the world's most productive and notorious areas for drugs and smuggling. A number of opium dens are known to operate in the area and in 2000, Laotian police confiscated 398,000 methamphetamine pills in a truck. Since 1992, political difficulties and territorial disputes between Laos and China has also led to increased trafficking of goods across the border including beer, cigarettes, fruit, rice, batteries and clothes. Tourism has also begun in Muang Sing, with both wealthy travellers and young backpackers, the main focus being to visit the remote Akha villages. Due to the increase in tourism in recent years, a number of small new hotels and restaurants have sprung up in the town.

On the main market in Muang Sing Yunnanese traders sell goods such as Western clothing, fake sports clothing and gear, electrical and household appliances and cooking oil, and local ethnic people sell mostly vegetables, fruits, herbs and spices.

== Notable landmarks ==
The principal temple of some 20 in Muang Sing is the Wat Sing Jai or Wat Xieng Jai, behind the Muangsing Guest House. The monastery, painted in hues reminiscent of the Caribbean, has a museum, but because its items are of high local value, it is closed to visitors for fear of theft. Another major temple is the Wat Namkeo. The wihan in the town are typically multi-tired roofed buildings typical of northern Laos, but most houses have corrugated metal roofs and wooden beams, reflecting a lack of wealth in the area. The Buddhas, however, are golden, and typically have large long earlobes, commonly seen in Xishuangbanna, China and Shan State of Burma.

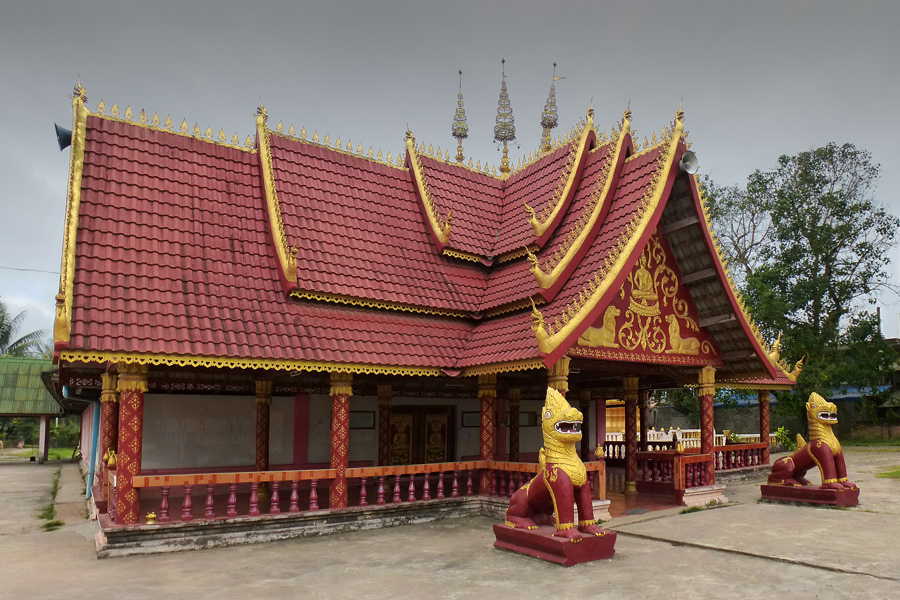
Wat Xieng Jai wihan

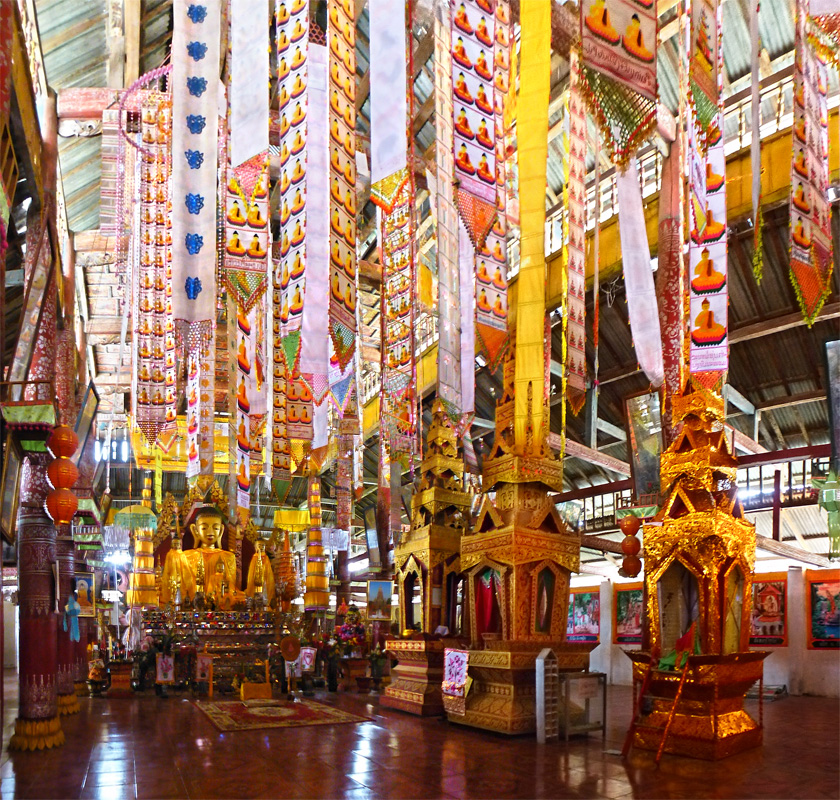
Wat Xieng Jai interior

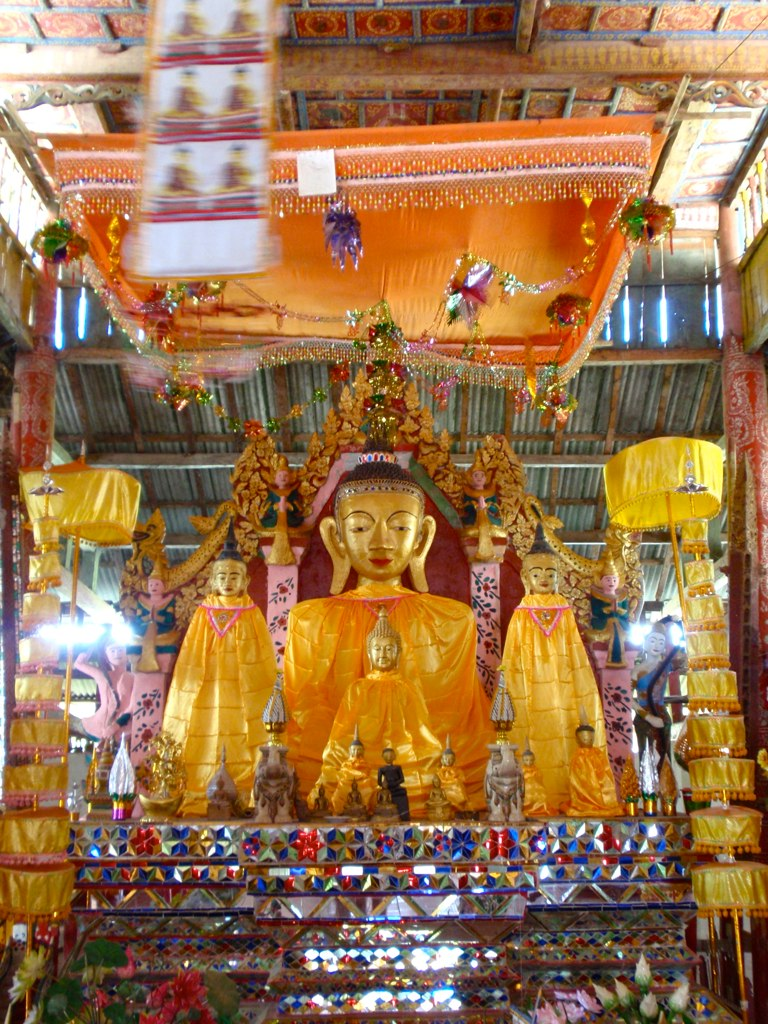
Wat Xieng Jai main sanctuary

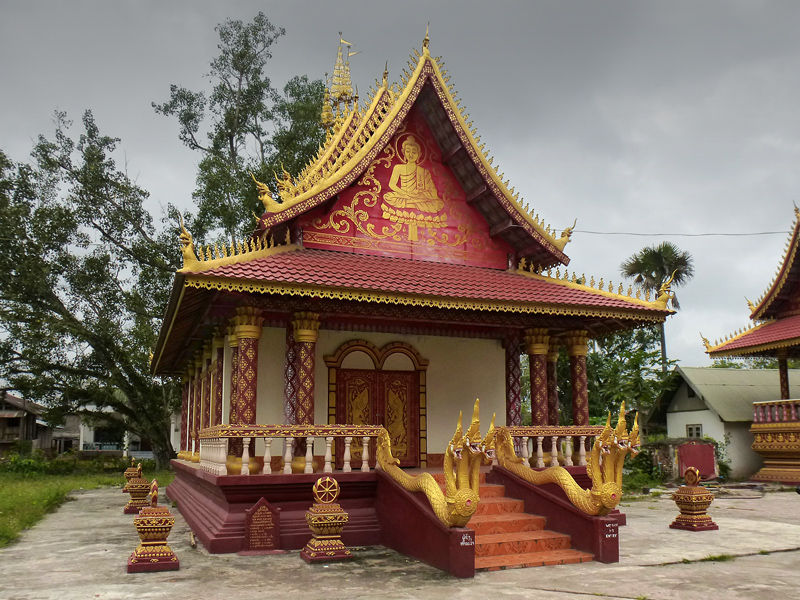
Wat Xieng Jai sim

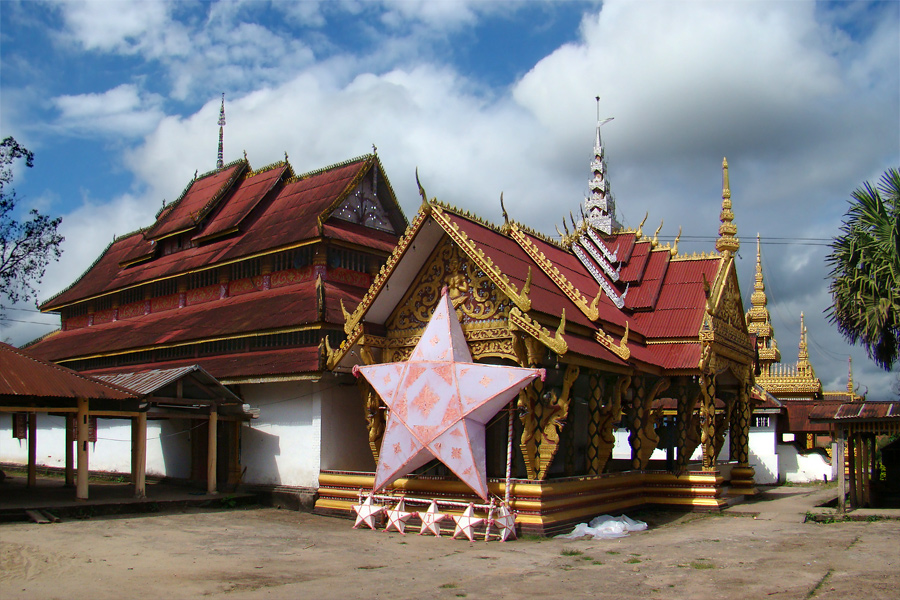
Wat Nam Keo Luang main hall

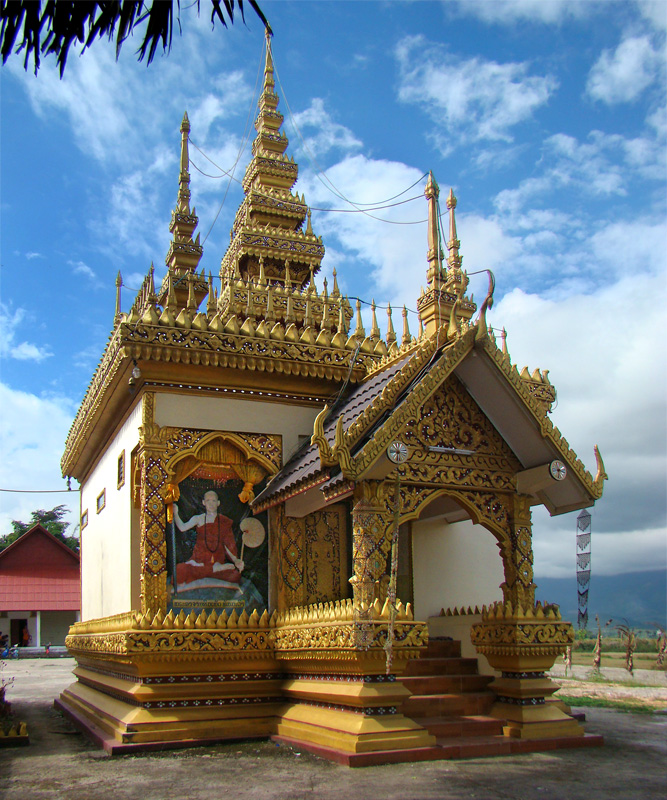
A Wat Nam Keo Luang stupa

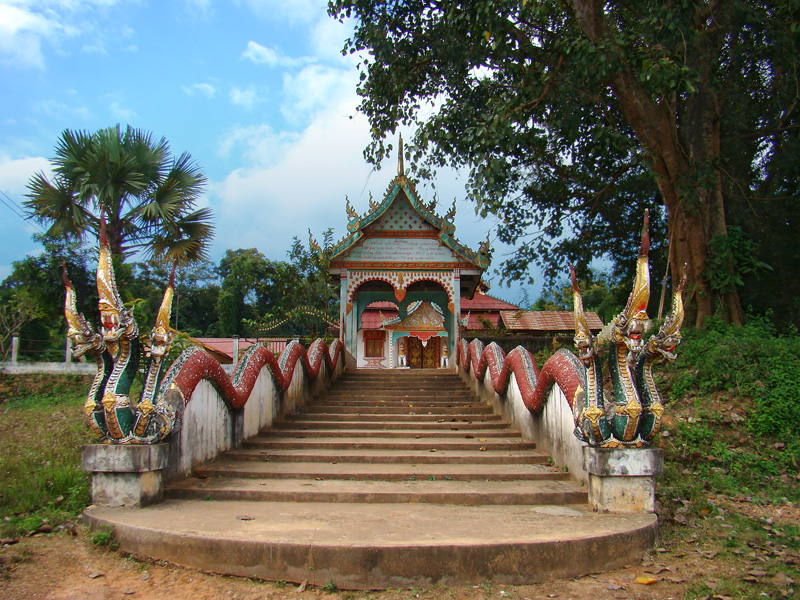
Wat Homexay entrance

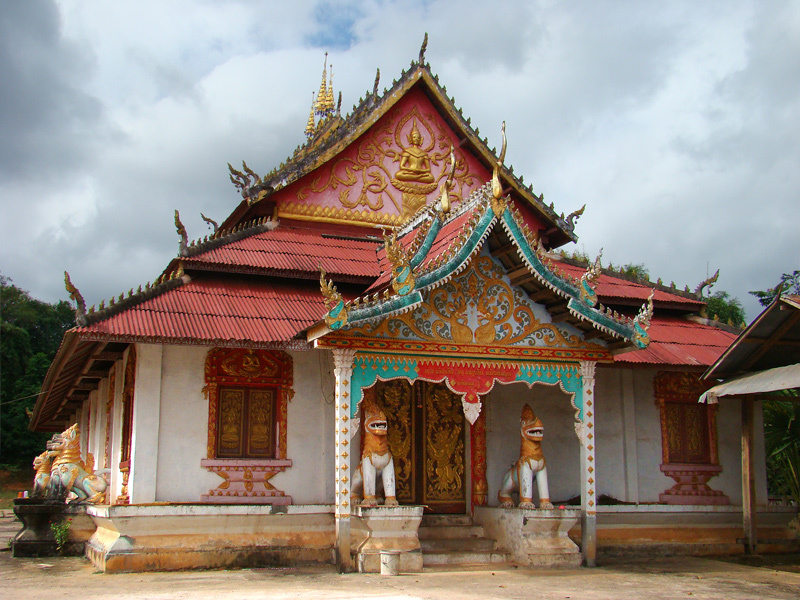
Wat Homexay main hall

== Culture ==
Most of the houses in the district are built in the traditional style with wooden beams, raised off of the ground on stilts and covered with thatched/bamboo roofs. The locals, especially the Tam Dao and Tai Lue people, are adept at silk and cotton weaving. The Tam Dao weave sins (traditional Lao skirts), scarves and works of art. The Tai Lue cotton weavers in villages such as Nong Boua and Xieng Yun make dyes consisting of a blend of leaves, flowers, insects and wood and weave traditional cotton textiles. The women of the Akha ethnic group are also skilled at making heavy indigo-dyed cotton fabric, generally used to make bags, clothes and other souvenirs to sell to tourists. The Yao people are noted in particular for their needlework and embroidery and are skilled in making trousers, tunics and turbans. Between November and January, they produce a durable bamboo paper which is dried and later used as paper, primarily for religious purposes. The Hmong also manufacture embroidered clothing, bags and blankets for special ceremonies and festivals. The locals manufacture banners with bright colors such as orange, pink, blue, green, red and purple and often feature animals, humans and with Buddhist themes. The banners are typically 2 or 3 metres in length and 1 ft in diameter and are often adorned with beads, sequins, tassels, metal foil and paper.

A notable local dish is Khao soi (English: "rice cut"), a Lao noodle soup, made by slicing a rice pancake into strips with scissors. Khao soi noodles are particularly popular among the Tai Lue and Tai Neua villagers, especially in the village of Ban Siliheung. The alcoholic drink Lao Lao is a staple of the locals, a rice beer made from fermenting and distilling rice in large steel drums. Ban Koum, four kilometres southeast of the main town on the road to Luang Namtha is noted for its whisky production.

Since the 1980s, there has been a marked revival of Buddhism in Muang Sing and as of 2000, there was reported to be 21 temples in the district, most of them relatively new. In January 1996 Khuba Bunchum (1965-), a Buddhist teacher from Bangsa, built two stupas in the area.

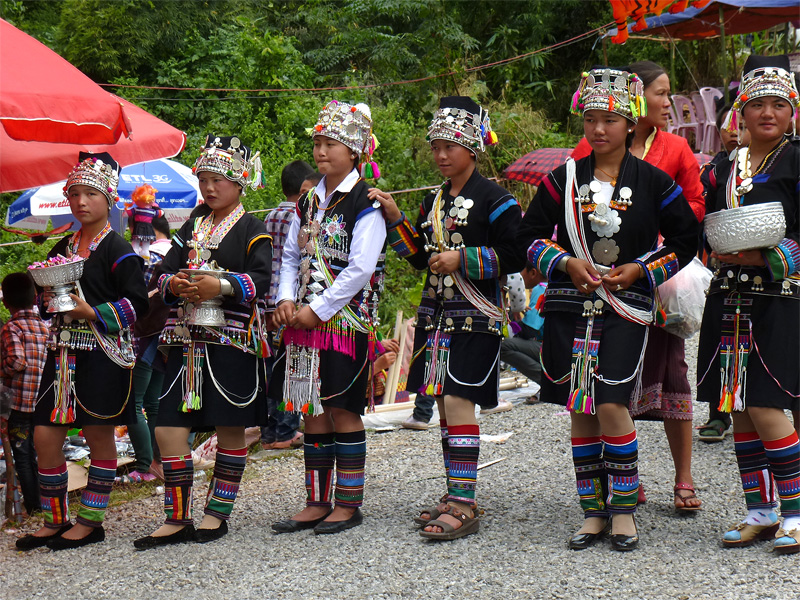
Akha at the That Xieng Tung Festival

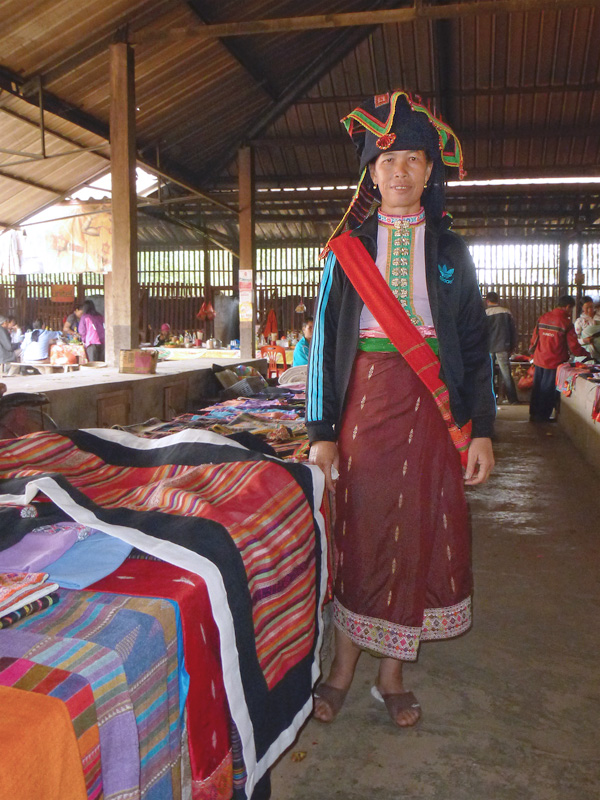
Tai Dam woman at Muang Sing market

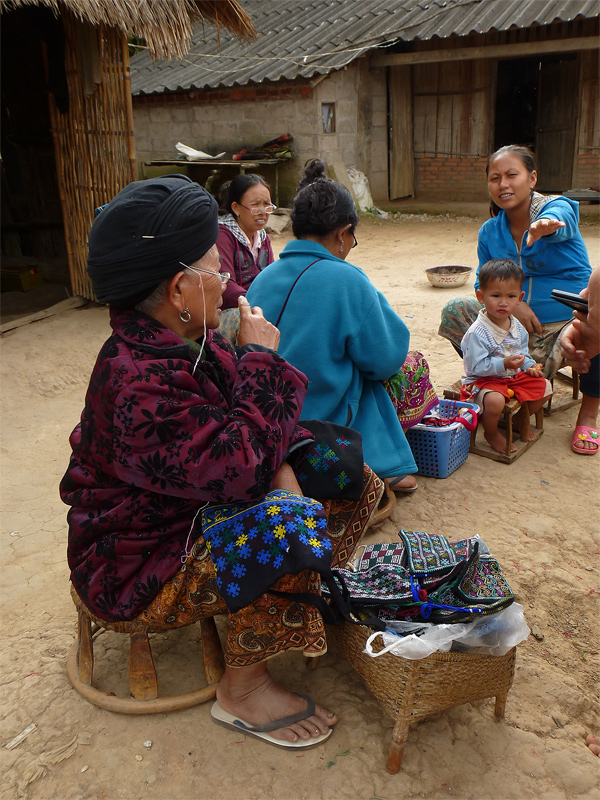
Yao people in Nam May village

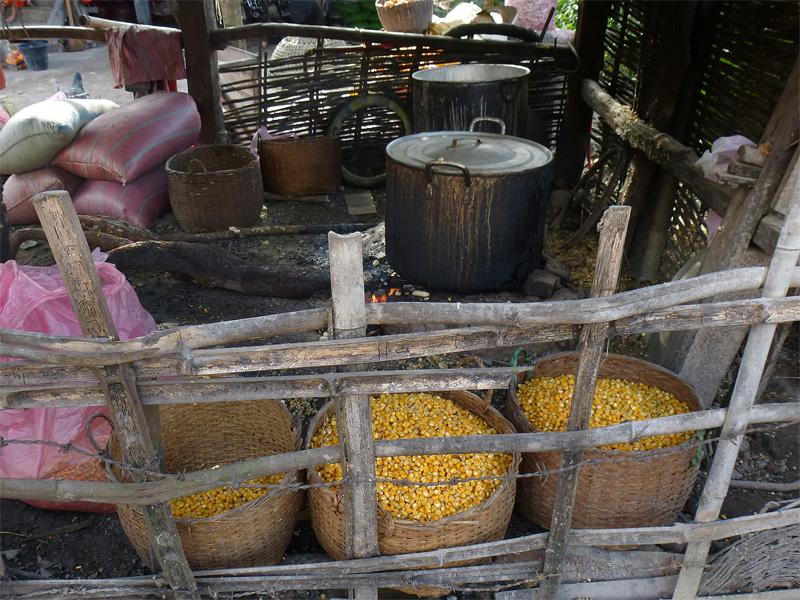
Lao lao distillery in Ban Patoy
