= Long District =

Long district may refer to:

- Long district, Laos
- Long district, Thailand
