= Luang Namtha province =

Province of Laos

Luang Namtha province ແຂວງ ຫລວງນໍ້າທາ
- Province
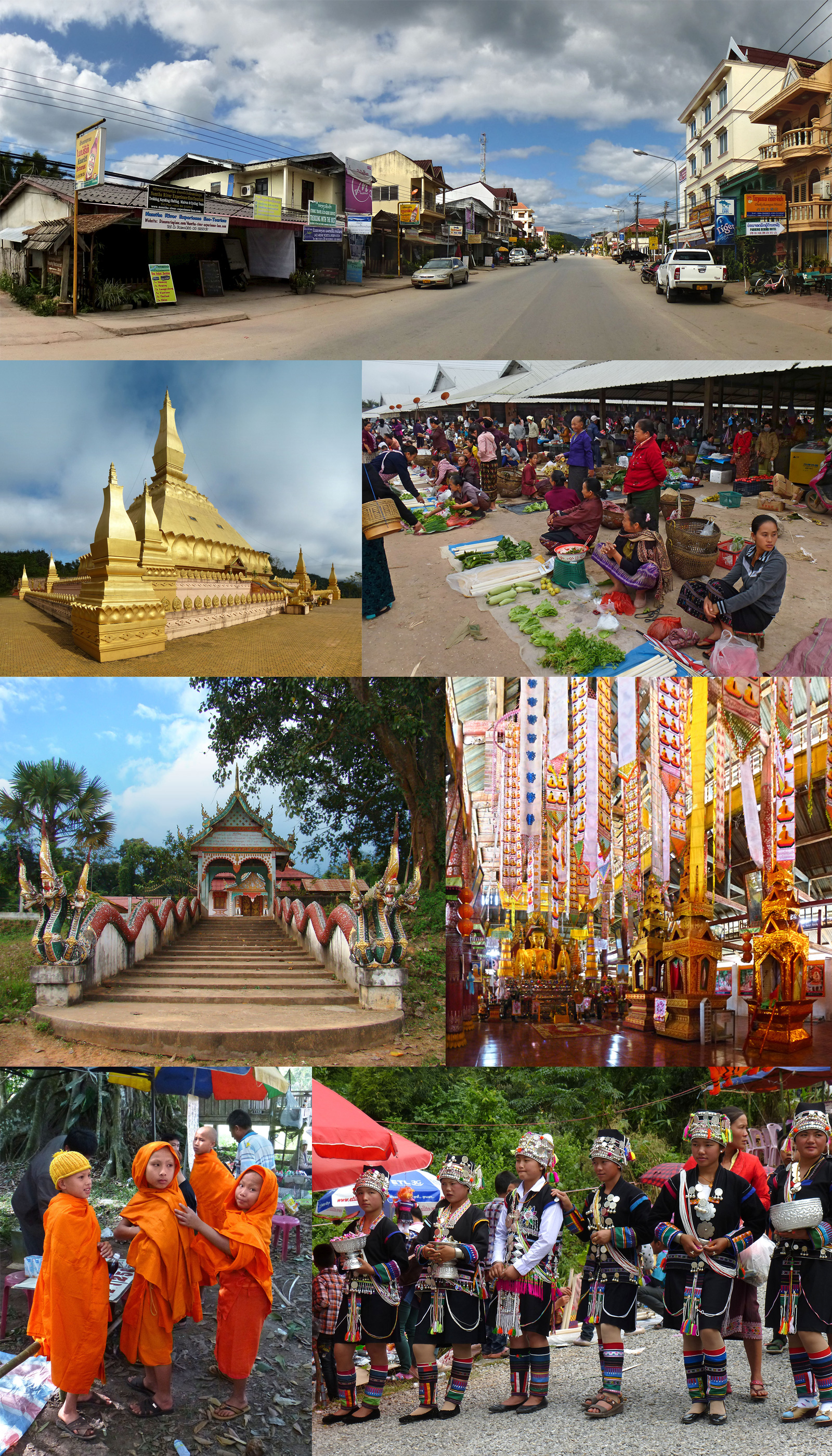

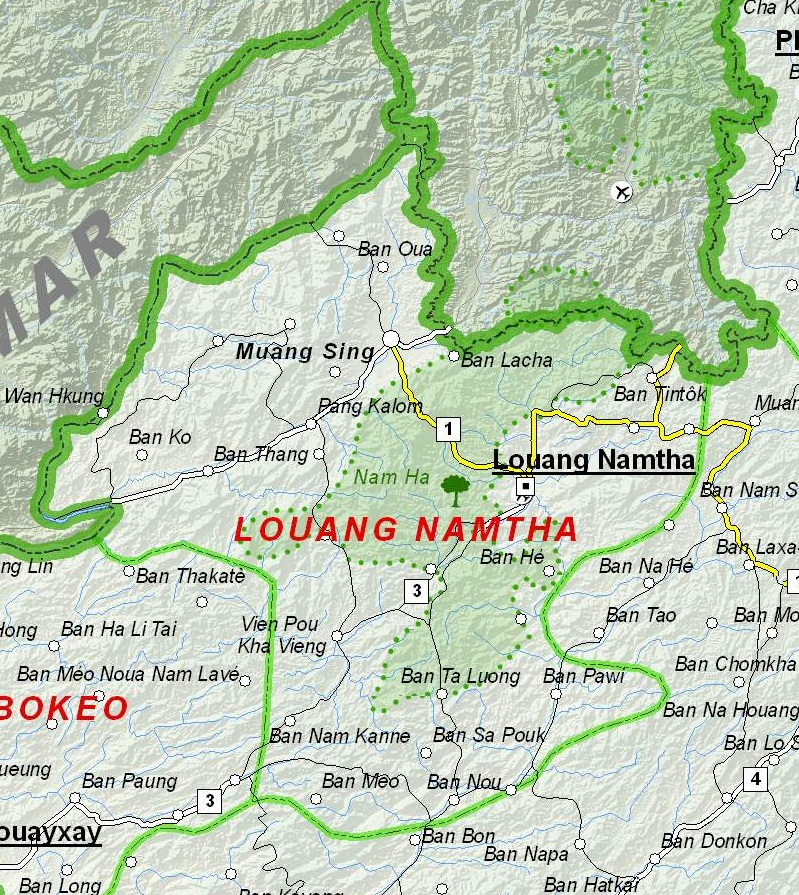
- Map of Luang Namtha province

- Location of Luang Namtha province in Laos
- Coordinates: 20.956944°N 101.395°E
- Country: Laos
- Capital: Luang Namtha

Area
  - Total: 9,325 km^{2} (3,600 sq mi)

Population (2020 census)
  - Total: 199,090
  - Density: 21.35/km^{2} (55.30/sq mi)
- Time zone: UTC+7 (ICT)
- ISO 3166 code: LA-LM
- HDI (2022): 0.588 medium · 12th

Luang Namtha (Lao: ຫລວງນໍ້າທາ, pronounced [lǔaŋ nâːm.tʰáː]; literally 'royal sugar palm' or "'royal green river') is a province of Laos in the country's north. From 1966 to 1976 it formed, together with Bokeo, the province of Houakhong. Luang Namtha province covers an area of 9,325 square kilometres (3,600 sq mi). Its provincial capital is Luang Namtha. The province borders Yunnan, China to the north, Oudomxai province to the east and southeast, Bokeo province to the southwest, and Shan State, Myanmar to the northwest. The province contains the Nam Ha National Biodiversity Conservation Area and is a sugar cane and rubber producing area. There are some 20 temples in Muang Sing, including Wat Sing Jai and Wat Namkeo. The anthropological Luang Namtha Museum is in Luang Namtha.

== Geography ==
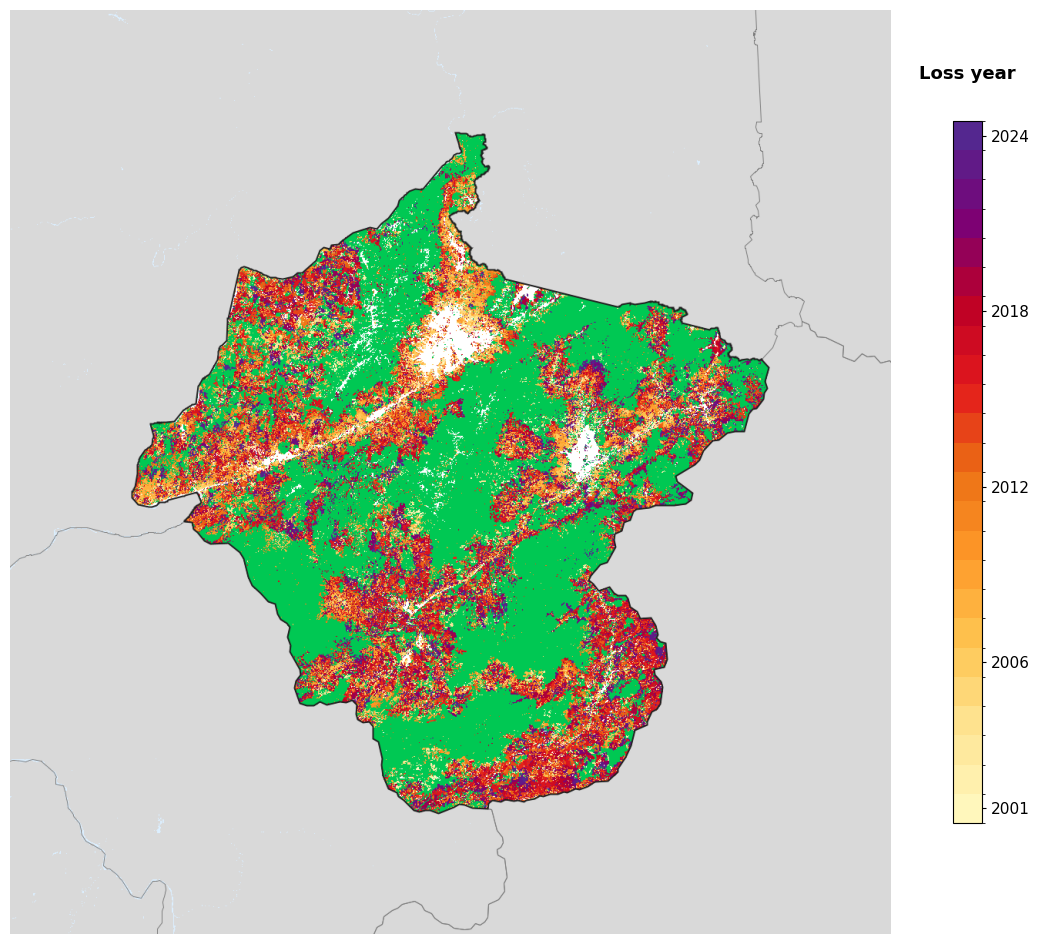
Tree-cover loss year in Luang Namtha, 2001-2024, from the Global Forest Change dataset.

Luang Namtha province covers an area of 9,325 square kilometres (3,600 sq mi). The province is bordered by Yunnan, China to the north, Oudomxai province to the east and southeast, Bokeo province to the southwest, and Burma to the west. Settlements include Luang Namtha, Muang Sing, Ban Oua, Ban Lacha, Ban Tintok, Ban Ko, Pang Kalom, Ban Thang, Ban Nam Kanne, Ban Meo, Ban Pawi, Ban Sa Pouk, Ban He and Ban Tintok.

The Mekong River (Nam Khong) marks the northwest border of the province. The Nam Tha, Nam Fa and Nam Long rivers drain westward and southward into the Mekong. The Phou mountain range runs along the Chinese-Lao border, consisting of mainly dry evergreen forest. Some roads in Luang Namtha province connect Houayxay in Bokeo with Luang Namtha town and Oudomxay with Boten. Boten is a border crossing with China (Mohan), and provides an export route from China, via Xien Kok, loading from trucks into boats on the Mekong. Preserved monsoon forest (mixed deciduous forest) can be found in Nam Ha National Biodiversity Conservation Area. It has developed as a sustainable cultural and eco-tourism destination with the help of neighbouring countries, and organizations including the European Union, UNESCO and the Lao National Tourism Administration. The eco-tourism activities involve trekking, river rafting, camping, kayaking, bird watching and mountain bike tours.

=== Protected areas ===
The Nam Ha National Biodiversity Conservation Area (NBCA) has forest covering 90% of the area. May to September are the rainy months with average annual rainfall of 1,256 millimetres (49.4 in). December to February are the winter months with temperatures touching as low as 5 °C (41 °F). There is fog in the morning with warmer and more sunny middays. The average annual temperature is 25.75 °C (78.35 °F). Vegetation zones in its plains are between 540–1,000 metres (1,770–3,280 ft) elevation, consisting of bamboo, secondary evergreen forest and scrub (introduced by humans). In the Northern Highlands zone, between elevations of 1,000–2,094 metres (3,281–6,870 ft), primary evergreen forest is mixed with secondary forest and patches of Imperata grass. In the Southern Highlands, which range between 1,000–1,572 metres (3,281–5,157 ft) elevations, there is evergreen forest and scrub. Secondary evergreen forests and scrub are found in the Nam Kong area bordering the Chinese border, lying between elevations 600–1,556 metres (1,969–5,105 ft). Wildlife reported from the NBCA are wild cattle such as gaur and banteng, Asian wild dogs, tigers, clouded leopard, bears, monkeys, gibbons and muntjac. The conservation area was initially established covering an area of 677 square kilometres (261 sq mi) in 1991 which was subsequently enlarged to an area 2,244 square kilometres (866 sq mi) (entirely within the province) which borders with Shiang Yong Protected Area in Yunnan province in China. There are 33 large mammals (of which 22 are key species), including Malayan sun bear and black cheeked crested gibbons, and 288 species of birds (of which 18 are key species). It has been designated as an Asian Heritage Site. One issue of concern is of rubber cultivation in large areas.

The Nam Ha Important Bird Area (IBA), 1,845.2 square kilometres (712.4 sq mi) in size, is in the Nam Ha NBCA. The IBA's elevation varies between 250–2,094 metres (820–6,870 ft). The topography is mountainous ridges. The habitat is dry evergreen forest, upper montane forest, and Imperata grassland. Crested finchbill (Spizixos canifrons), white-bellied redstart (Hodgsonius phaenicuroides), and white-necked laughingthrush (Garrulax strepitans) are unknown in any other Lao IBA. Confirmed fauna include Assamese macaque (Macaca assamensis) and the ungulate gaur (Bos gaurus).

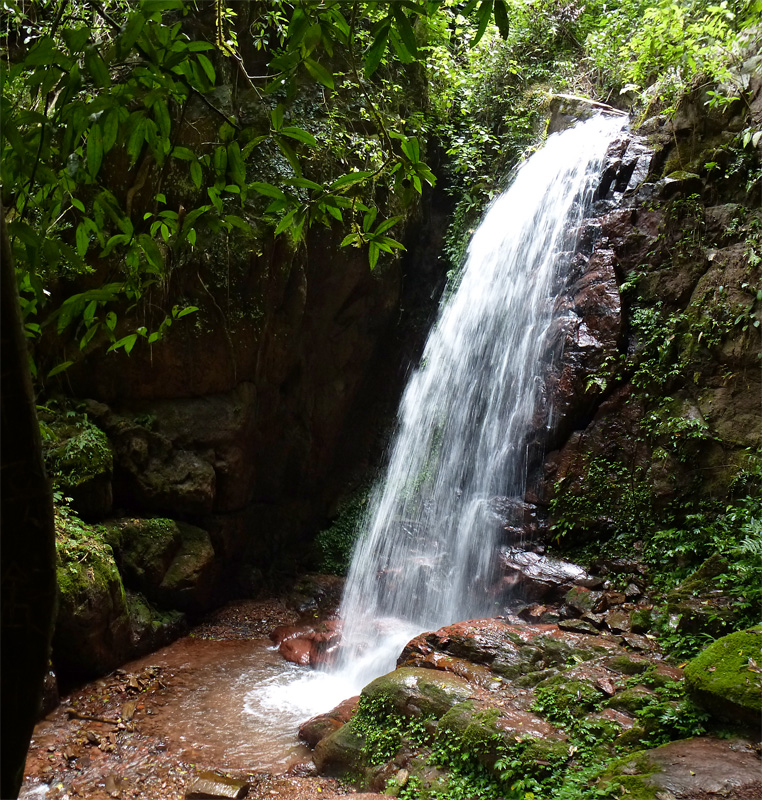
Pha Yeung Waterfalls, Nam Ha NBCA

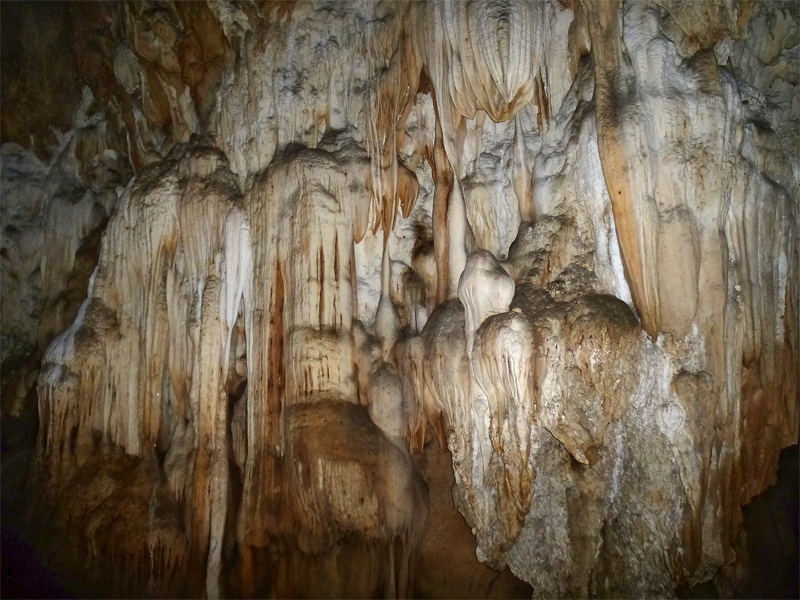
Kao Rao Caves, Nam Ha NBCA

=== Administrative divisions ===
The province is made up of the following five districts:

| Map | Code | Name | Lao script | Population (2015) |
|---|---|---|---|---|
| | 3-01 | Luang Namtha | ເມືອງຫຼວງນໍ້າທາ | 54,089 |
| | 3-02 | Muang Sing | ເມືອງສີງ | 39,287 |
| | 3-03 | Long | ເມືອງລອງ | 34,630 |
| | 3-04 | Viengphoukha | ເມືອງວຽງພູຄາ | 23,928 |
| | 3-05 | Na Le | ເມືອງນາແລ | 23,819 |

== History ==
The history of Luang Namtha province is traced to inhabitants who lived there about 6,000 years ago, evidenced by archaeological finds of stone implements discovered from the Nam Jook River Valley in Vieng Phoukha. The Xieng Khaeng Chronicles mention existence of Xieng Khaeng town in the 15th century, on the shores of the Mekong River. It became a vassal of the Lan Na Kingdom of northern Thailand until the 16th century. From the 16th until the 19th century it came under Burmese control. In the first half of the 19th century, it was under Siamese rule and war-torn. In 1885, Chao Fa Silinor, supported by 1,000 Tai Lue people took control of Muang Sing, attracted by its agricultural lands.

In 1890, the Tai Yuan occupied the Nam Tha Valley for a period of two years, and thus Muang Houa Tha came to be reestablished. It was during this period that Vat Luang Korn, a temple in Luang Namtha, was built in 1892. In 1894, the French, British, and Siamese colonists, decreed that the province would be administered by the French. The border was redrawn with the Mekong River serving as the northern border (along its northern reaches of Muang Sing to Chiang Saen) between French Indochina and British Burma. This was followed by migration of the Tai Dam people from Sip Song Chou Tai from northwestern Vietnam who settled in the Tong Jai Village, on the east bank of the Nam Tha River. Other ethnic groups, such as the Tai Neua, Tai Kao, Akha, Lanten, Yao and Lahu from Sipsongpanna in Burma and northwest Vietnam migrated to the province. During French colonial rule, the provincial capital of Luang Namtha was the heart of the Sipsongpana civilization, which later moved to Yunnan province in southern China.

After France withdrew from Indochina in the 1950s, the Houa Thas were in conflict with the US-supported Royal Lao Army against Pathet Lao forces, and from 6 May 1962 the area was under Pathet Lao control. At this time the province was given the name Luang Namtha. The territory between Houei Xay and Vieng Phoukha, known as Houa Khong province, was royalist-controlled until the Lao People's Democratic Republic was established in 1975. From 1975 to 1983 Houa Khong and Luang Namtha were a single province and subsequently divided into Luang Namtha and Bokeo provinces.

The capital of the province, Luang Namtha, had to be shifted in 1976 to a higher ground, by about 7 km, as the original city was prone to floods, and somewhat destroyed during the Second Indochina War. The city has grid pattern layout and is surrounded by green paddy fields and is a hub of economic activity.

== Demographics ==
The population of the province as of the 2015 census was 175,753 persons. The ethnic groups reported were the Khamu, Akha (Eko), Hmong, Yao (Ioumien) and Lanetene. Lowland Lao people, Tai Lue, Thai Neua and Thai Dam reside in villages outside the Nam Ha National Biodiversity Conservation Area close to the town of Muang Sing.

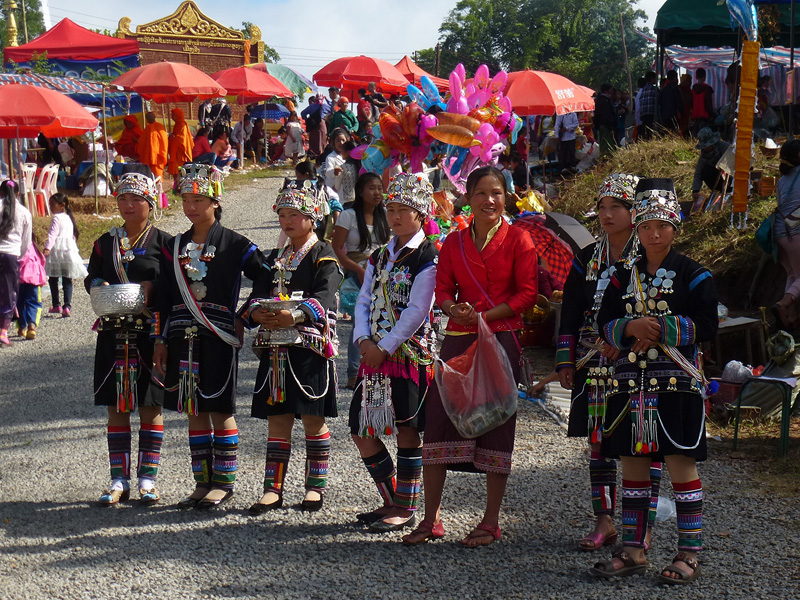
Akha people

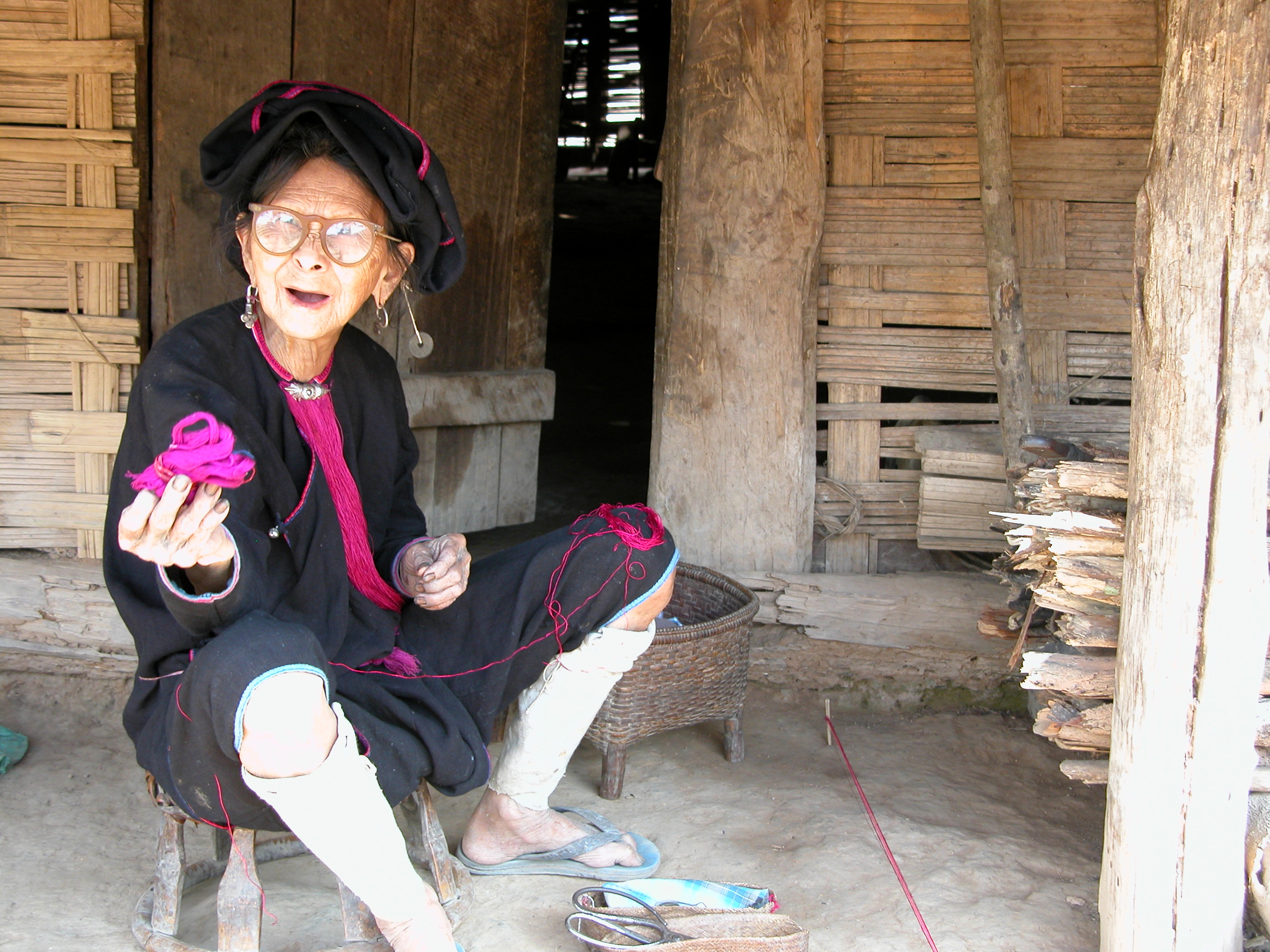
Lanten people

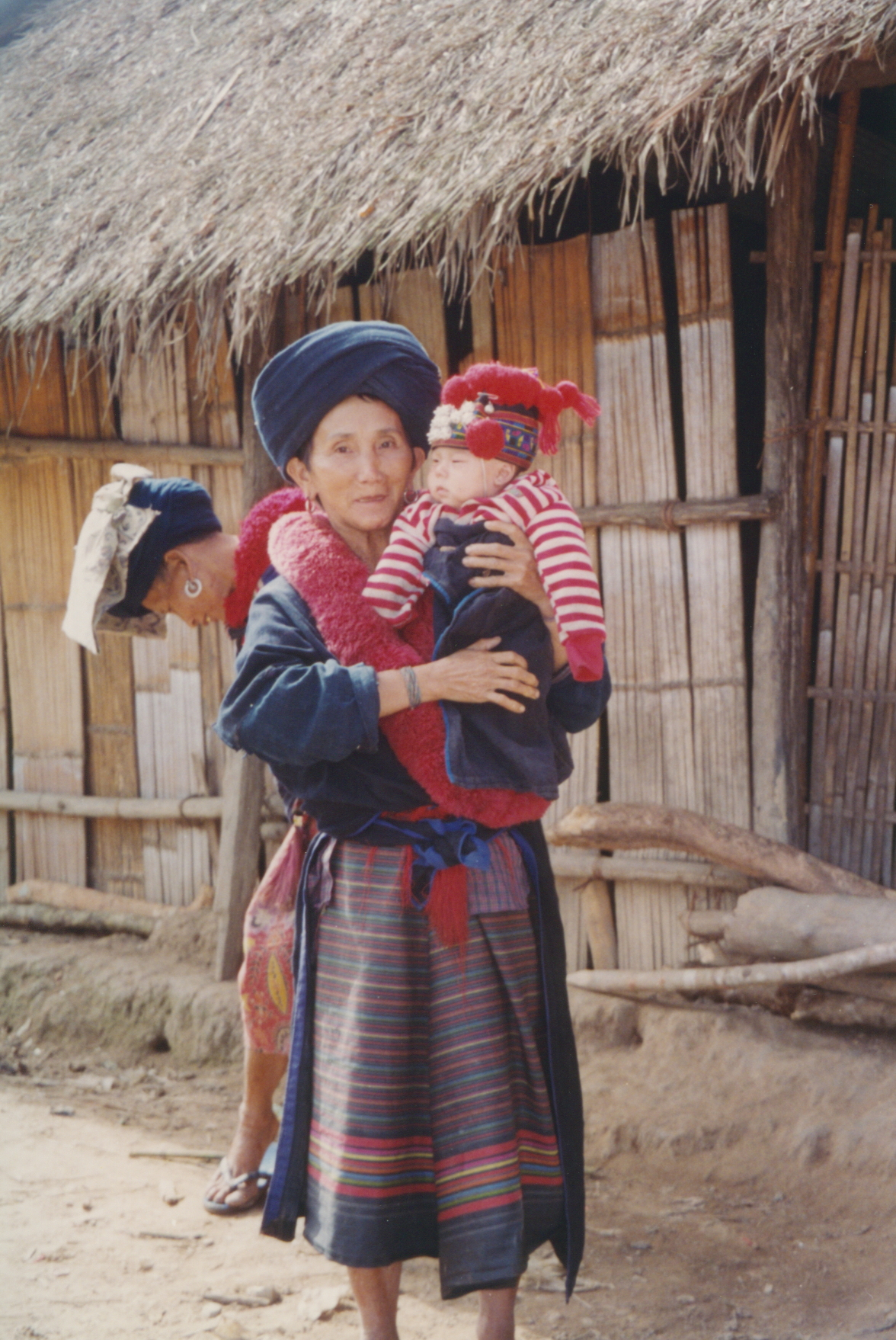
Mien people

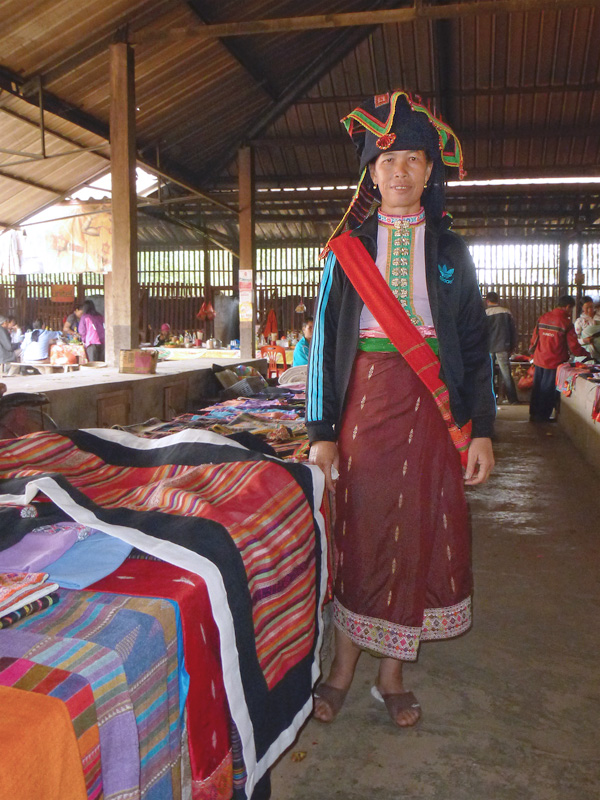
Thai Dam people

== Economy ==
The province is a sugarcane and rubber producing area. Other industries are agriculture, wood processing, lignite and copper mining, handicraft production, transportation and tourism. Shifting cultivation is practiced as an economic necessity. Food items such as rice, corn, casava, peanuts, cardamom, rattan, bamboo, jewel orchids, eaglewood, and ginger are used for internal consumption and sale. A range of wildlife is consumed or sold. The province has been the site of investments by China as part of its Belt and Road Initiative.

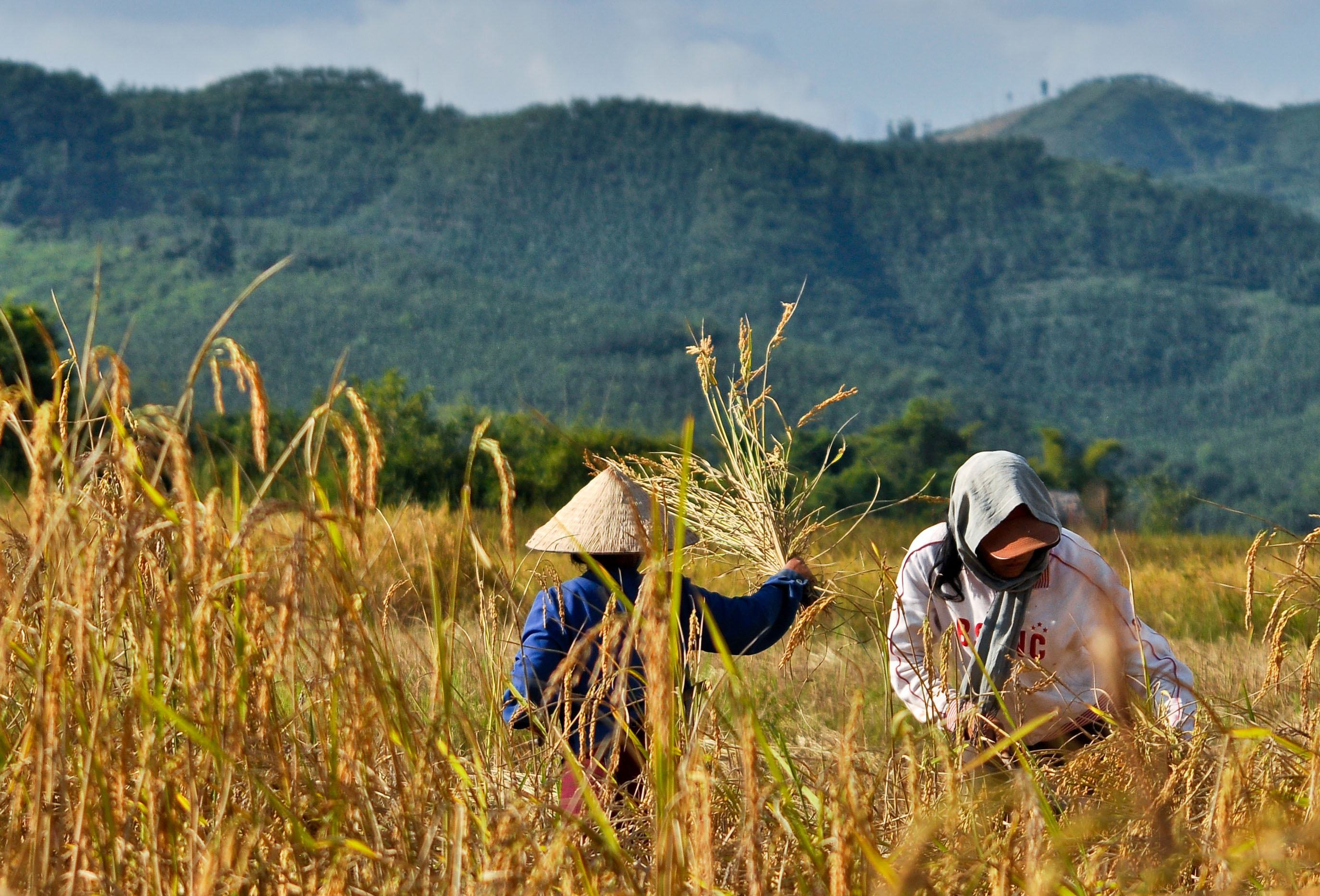
Farmers harvesting rice

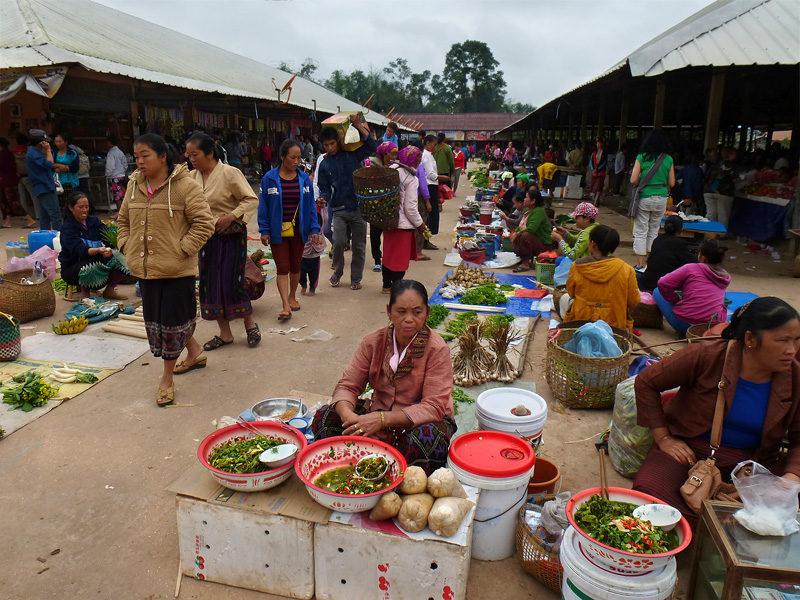
Morning market, Muang Sing

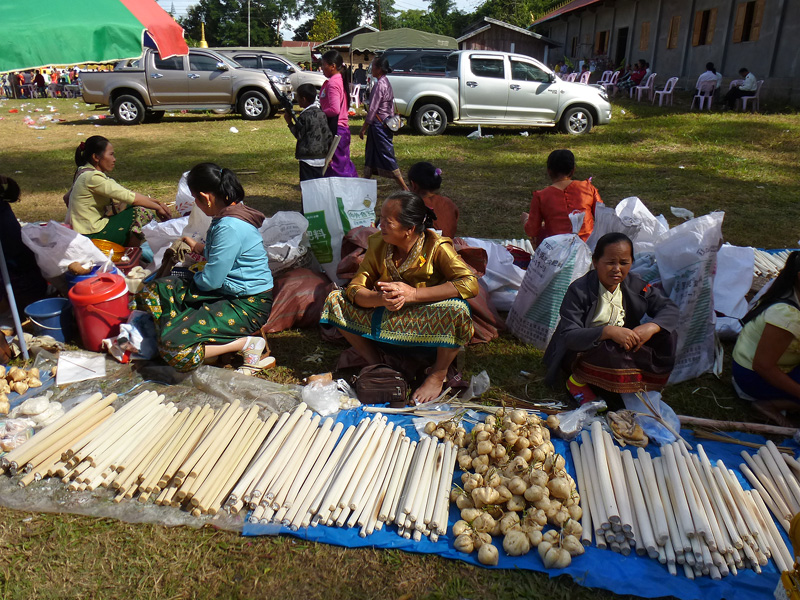
Sale of bamboo sticks with glutinous rice

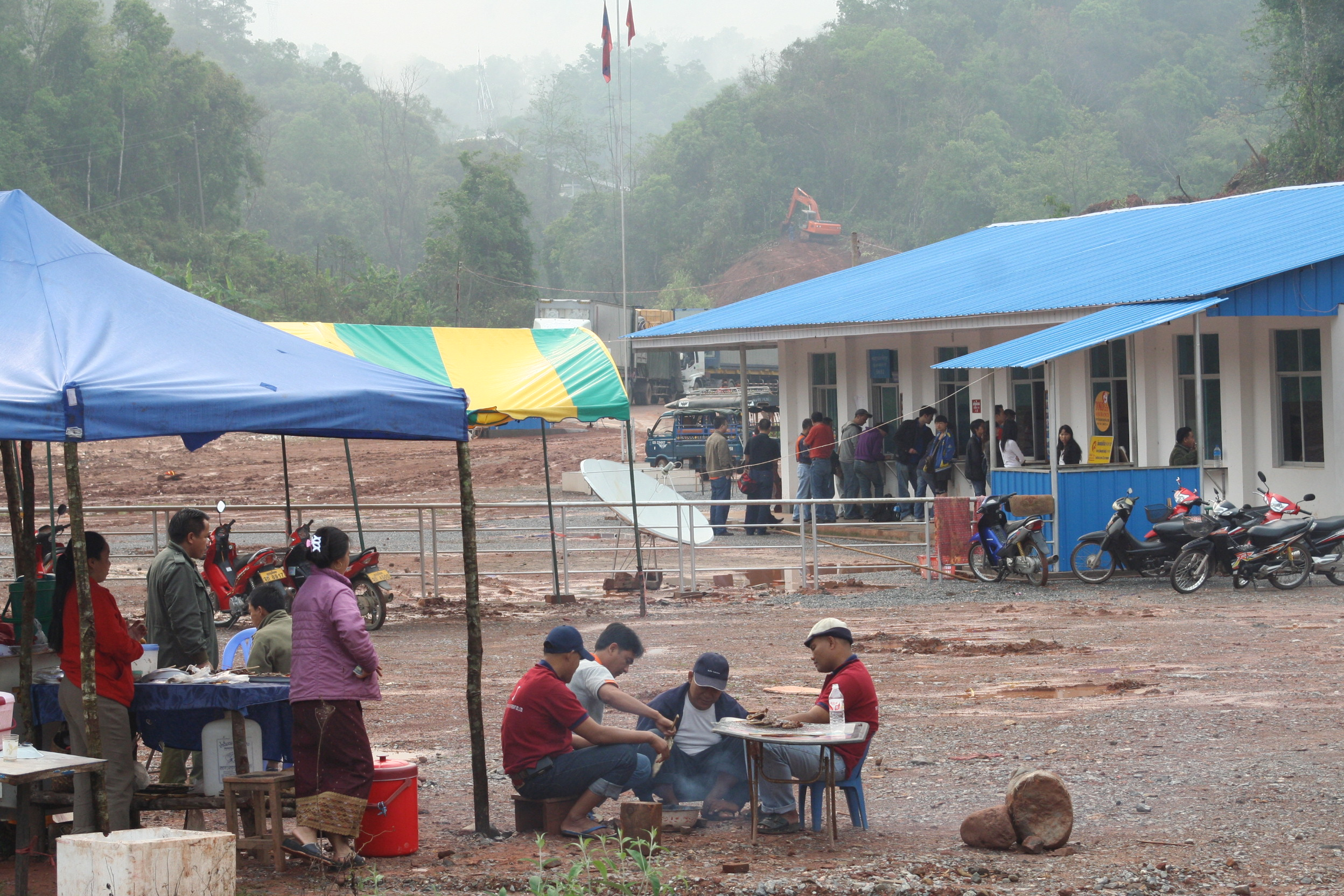
Border crossing with China

== Transport ==
=== Road ===
The Route 3 highway connects the Boten International Checkpoint on the border with China and Houayxay, opposite Thailand's Chiang Khong District, sometimes called the Chiang Rai - Kunming R3 highway. Route 13 and the Vientiane–Boten Expressway pass through the province and do not enter the provincial capital Luang Namtha.

=== Rail ===
The Boten–Vientiane railway, which parallels Route 13, serves the province.

=== Air ===
The Luang Namtha airport (LXG) has a daily flight to and from Vientiane's Wattay International Airport VTE, QV601/602.

== Landmarks ==
Muang Sing was a garrison town in the past and the northernmost outpost during French colonial rule. It was known as the center of the Sipsongpana civilization where the relics of barracks and other colonial buildings can be seen. The Sipsongpana people have shifted to Yunnan province in southern China. There are temples, and some of them were destroyed during the war.

There are some 20 temples in Muang Sing. Of note is Wat Sing Jai or Wat Xieng Jai, behind the Muangsing Guest House. The monastery, painted in hues reminiscent of the Caribbean, has a museum, and because its items are of high local value, it is closed to visitors for fear of theft.

Luang Namtha Museum, also known as Luang Namtha Provincial Museum, is in the capital city of Luang Namtha. Largely an anthropological museum, it contains items related to local peoples such as ethnic clothing, Khamu bronze drums, textiles, ceramics, tools, household utensils, handcrafted weapons, and Buddhism-related items.

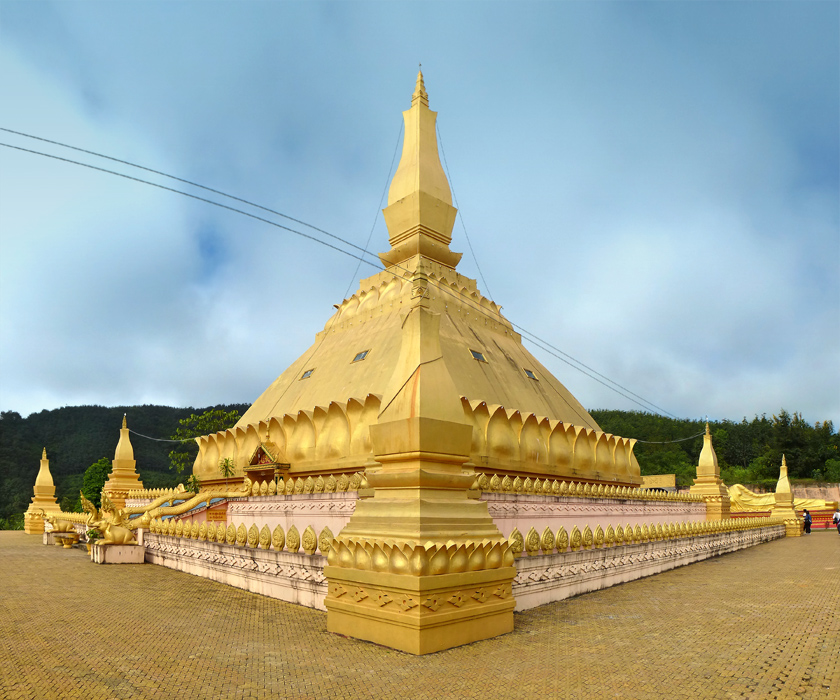
That Luang Namtha

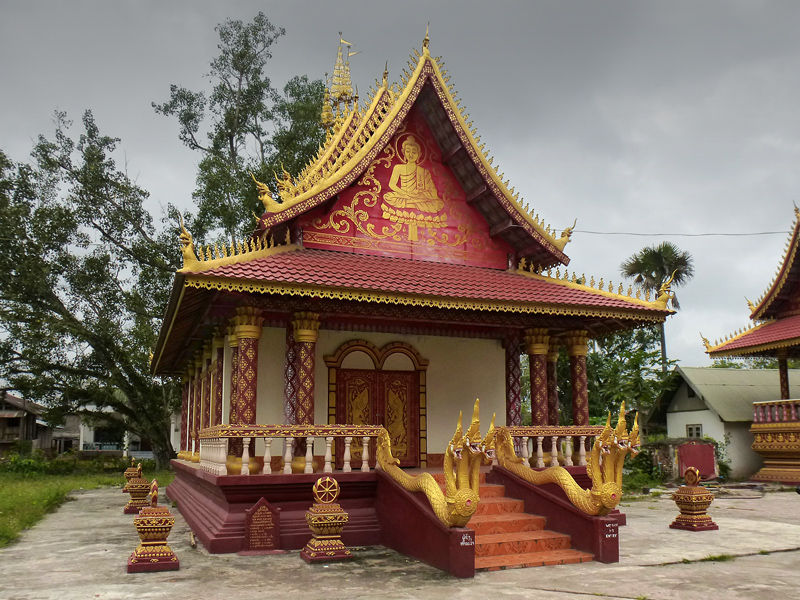
Wat Xieng Jai

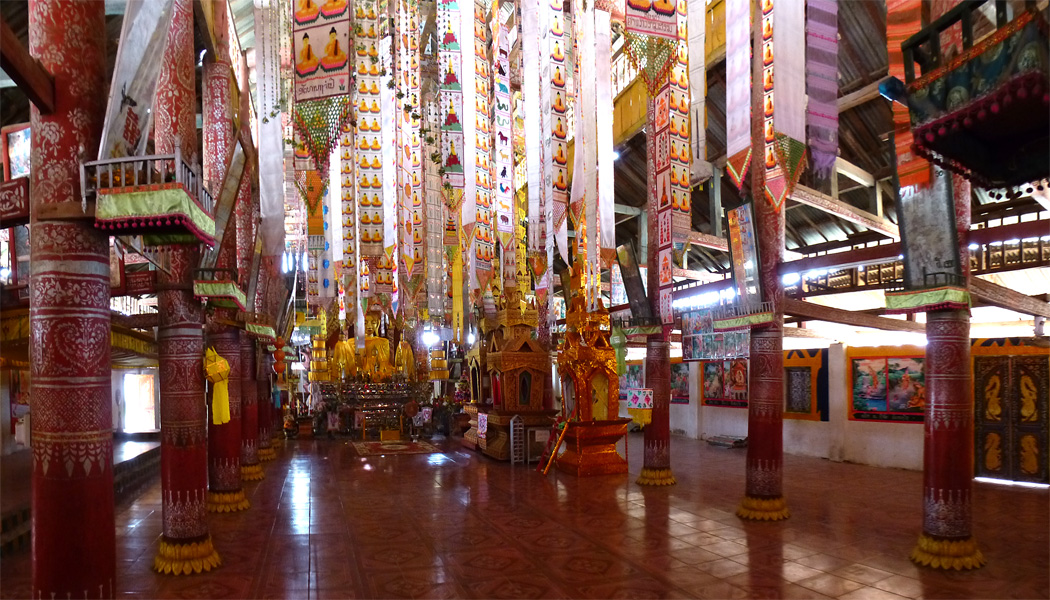
Wat Xieng Jai interior

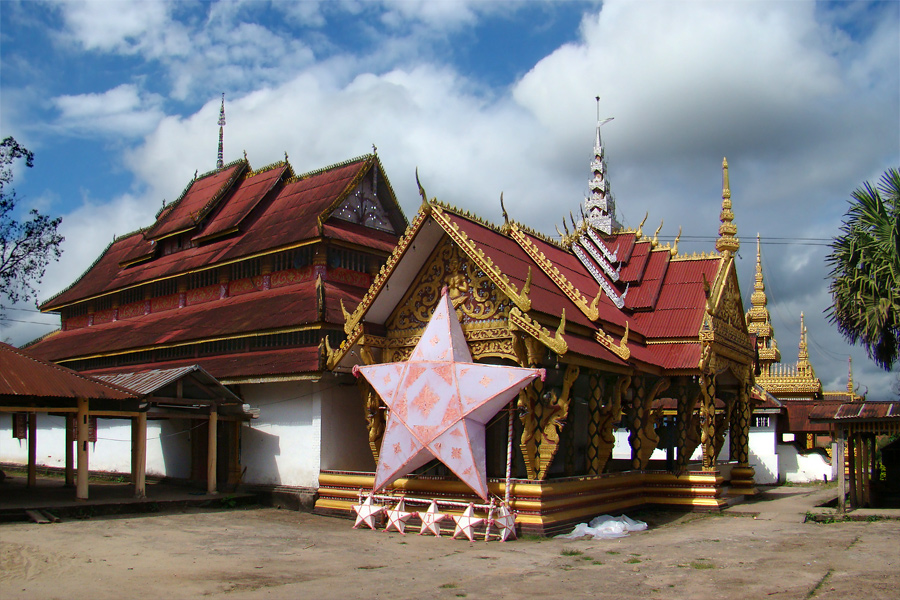
Wat Nam Keo Luang

== Villages ==
- Ban Nam Di
