= Ban Nam Di =

- Village
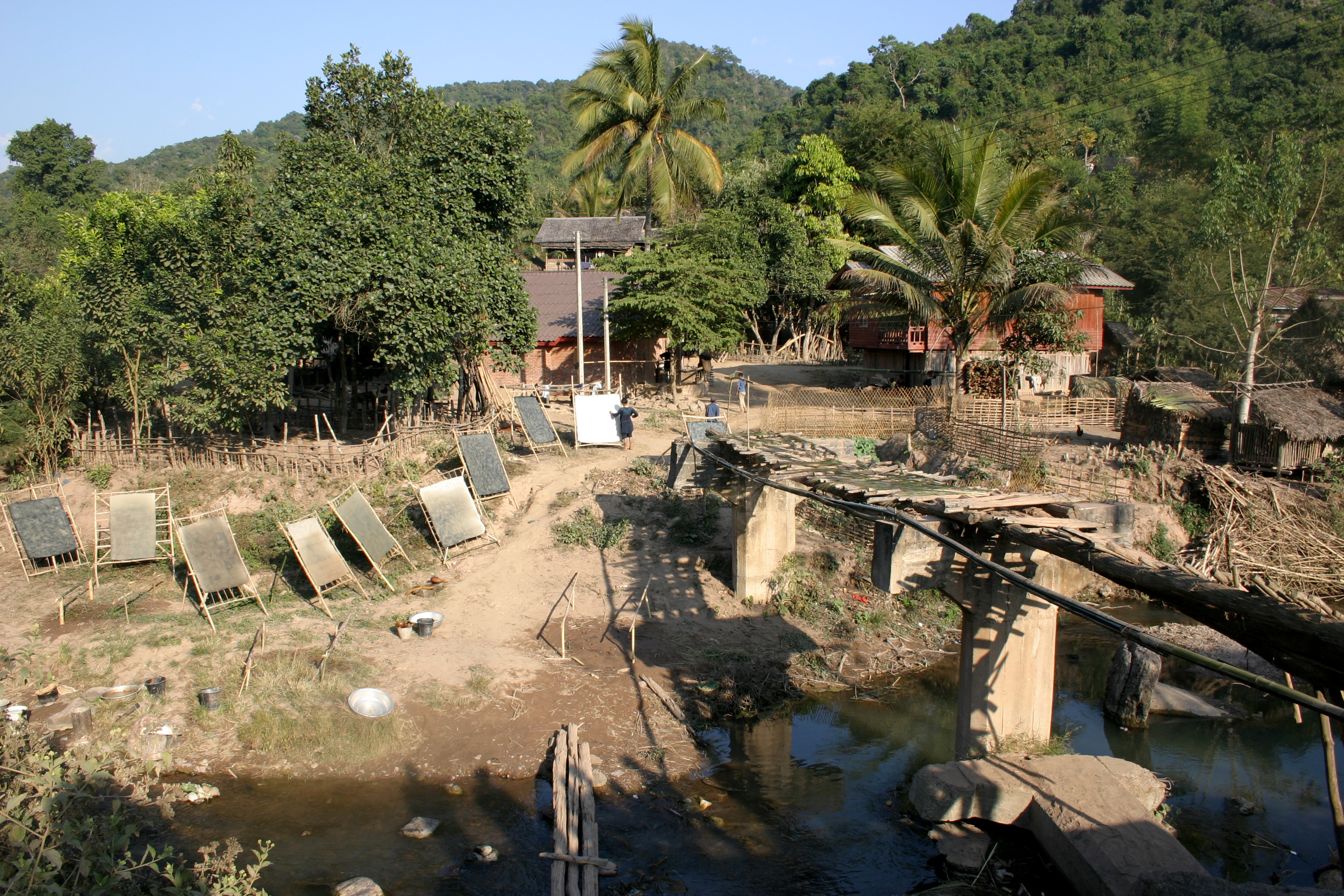
- Ban Nam Di

- Location within Laos
- Coordinates: 21°0′52″N 101°26′17″E
- Country: Laos
- Province: Luang Namtha

Population (2000)
  - Total: 500
- Time zone: UTC+7 (Laos Standard Time)

Ban Nam Di is a village in Luang Namtha Province, Laos, located about 6 kilometres (3.7 mi) northeast of Luang Namtha. It has a population of about 500. The Nam Di River flows nearby and the Nam Di waterfall is about a 1 kilometre (0.62 mi) from the village. The village is famous for its bamboo paper making by the Lanten peoples. The locals are adept at turning bamboo into pulp on the river banks and making paper by spreading it thinly over square cotton screens. The paper is usually primarily for Taoist religious purposes, but in recent years the villagers have been producing it as souvenirs for tourists. The houses in the village are mainly made with bamboo roofs.

Paper making

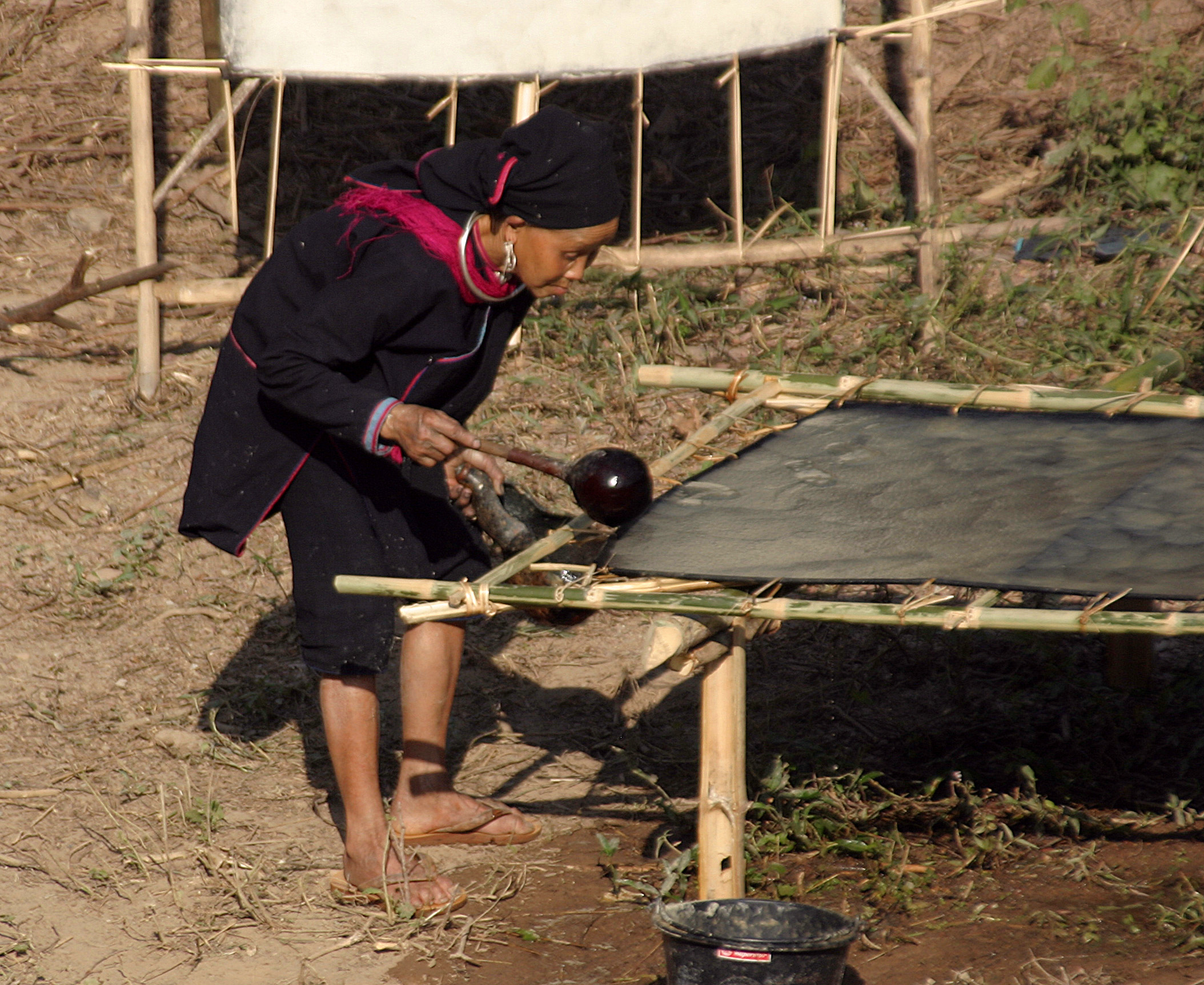

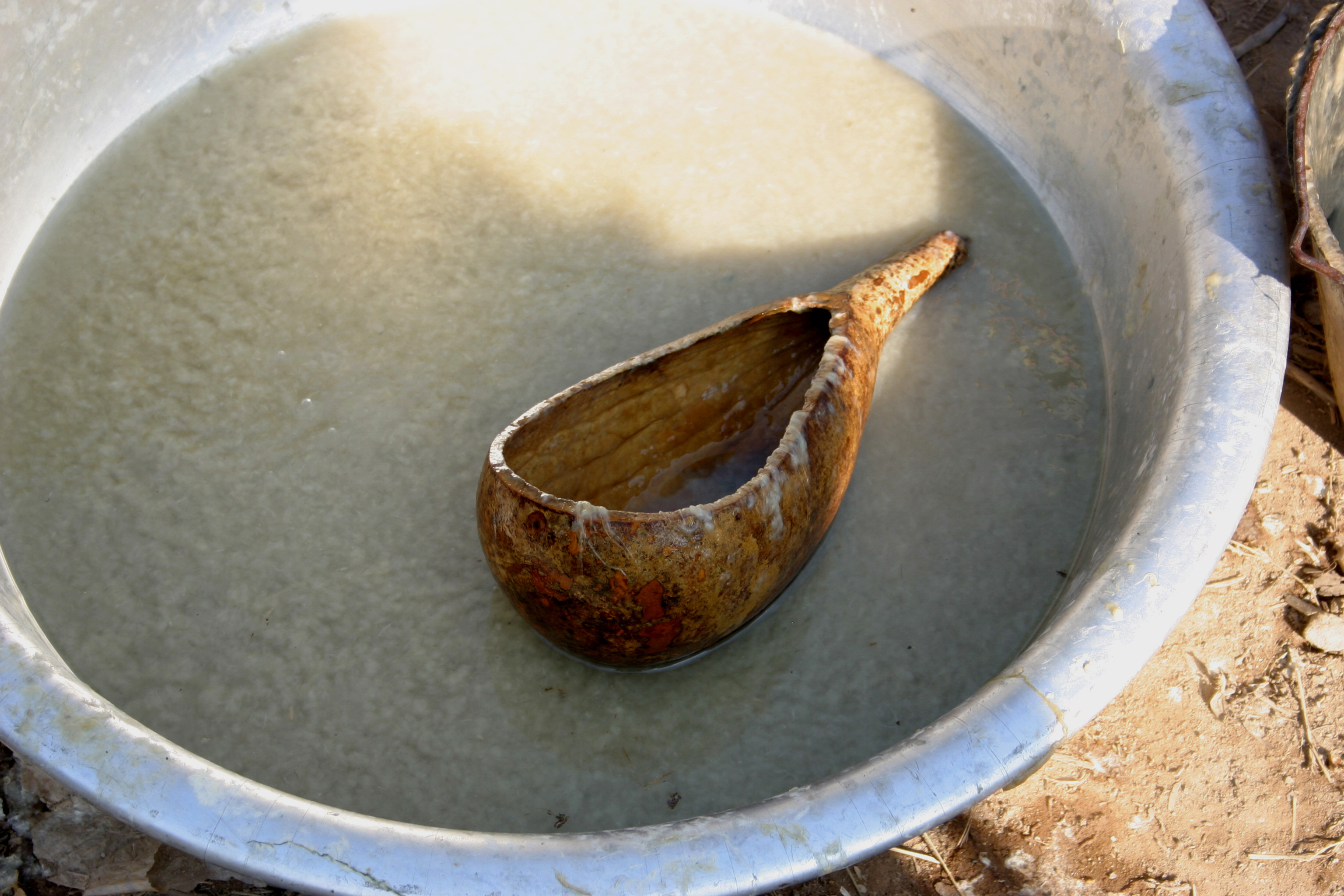

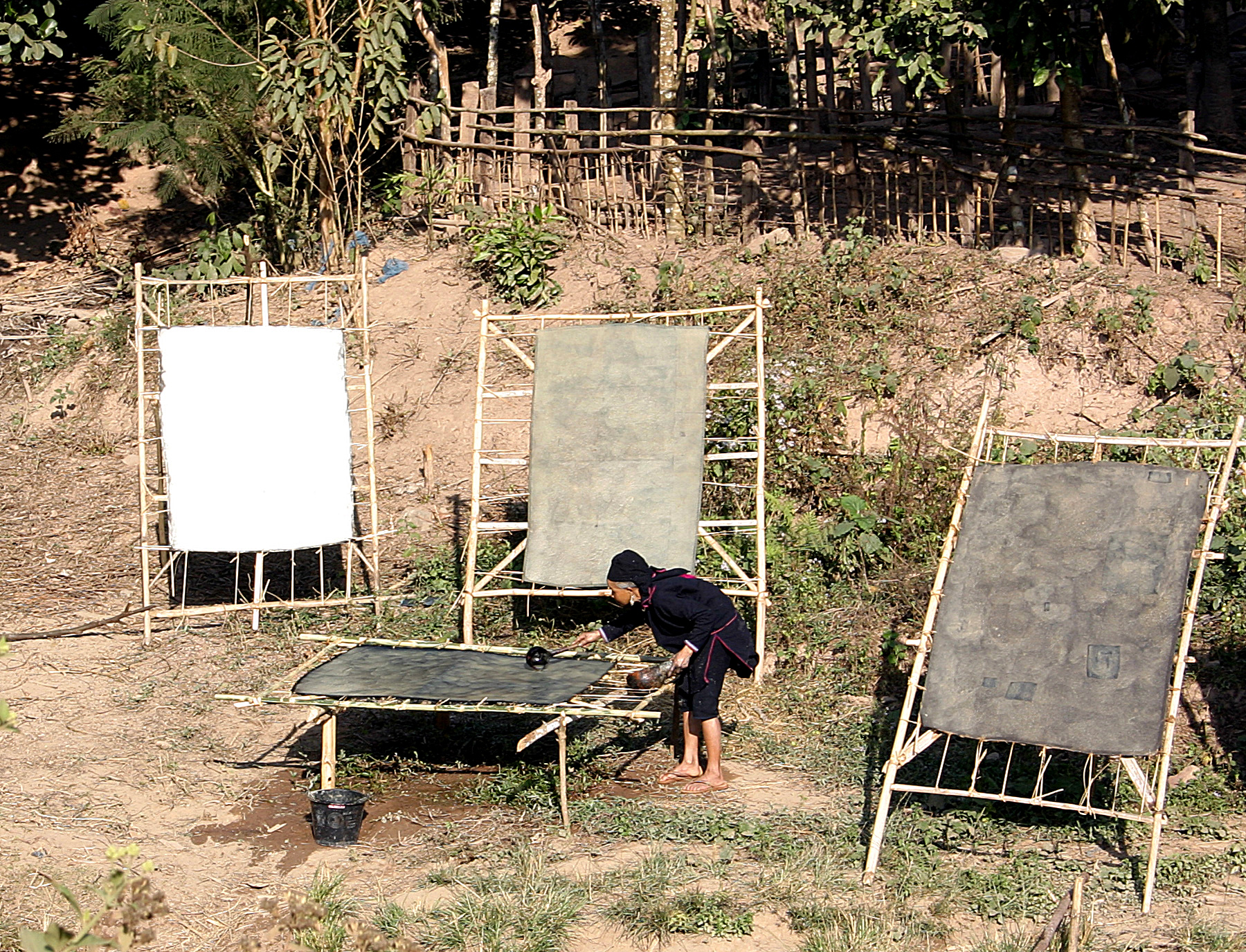

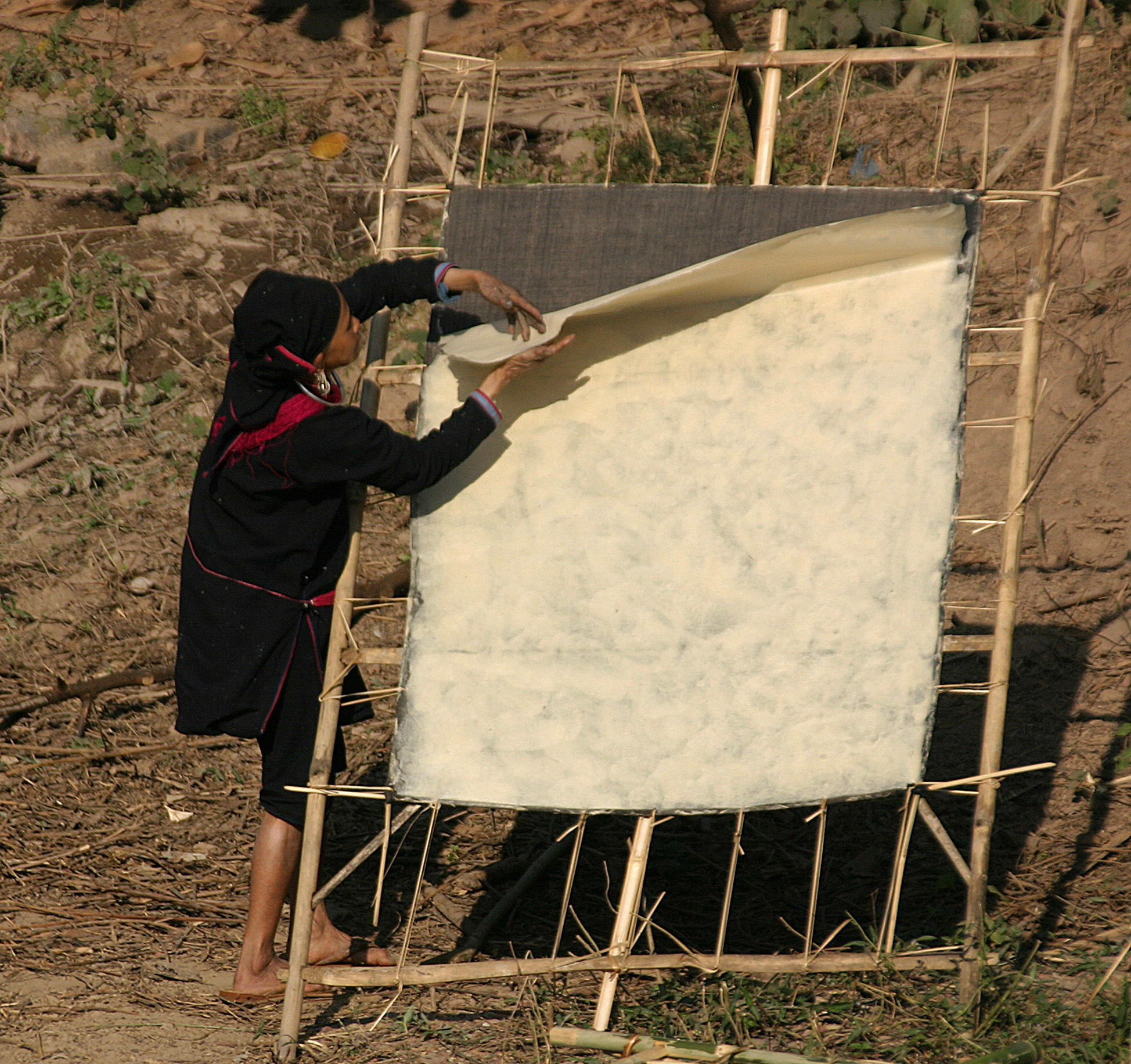
