= Tha River =

River in Laos

Coordinates: 21°13′00″N 101°31′59″E

Tha River Nam Tha

Location
- Country: Laos

Physical characteristics
- Source
  - location: Near Chinese border, northwest Laos
- Mouth: Mekong River
  - location: Southeast of Ban Houayxay
- Length: 215 km (134 mi)

Basin features
- Meaning of name: Green River (due to water color)

The Tha River (Nam Tha) is a river in northwest Laos, and one of the 12 tributaries on the Mekong River. It gave its name to the town of Luang Namtha and the province of the same name. The name Nam Tha (ນໍ້າທາ) means 'Green River', coming from the color of the water in the river.

The valley along the river is primarily agricultural in use and has been referred to as "the granary of Luang Prabang".
