= Chiang Khaeng =

Former Shan state in Burma

Coordinates: 21°21′N 100°52′E

- State of the Shan States
- 15th century–1896
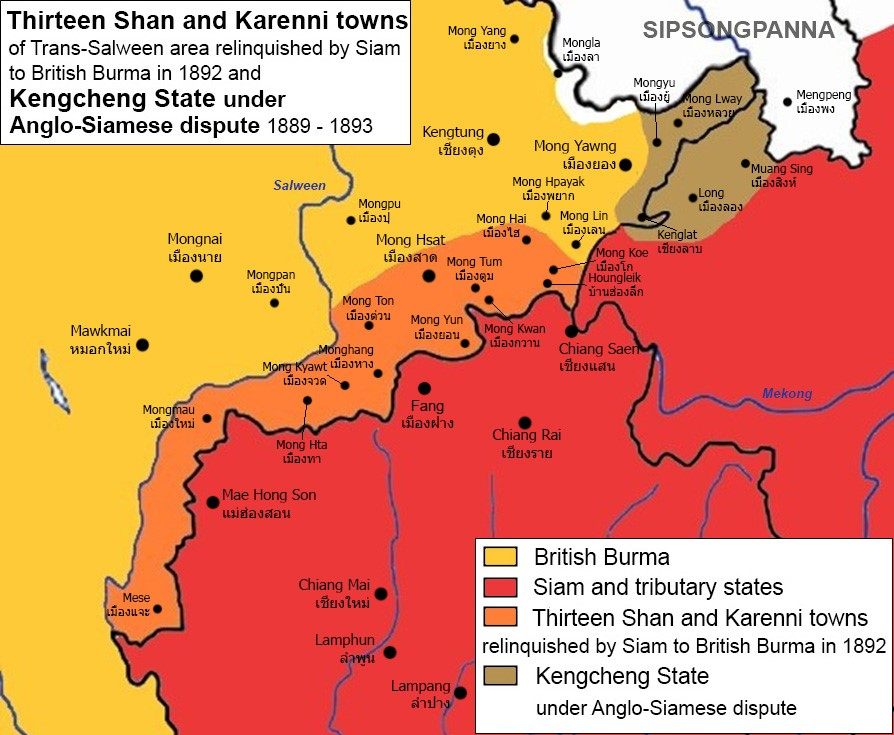
- Chiang Khaeng (brown) in 1892
- Capital: Chiang Khaeng (1400s‍–‍1858); Muang Yu (1858‍–‍1885); Muang Sing (1885‍–‍1896)
- History
  - Foundation of the state: 15th century
  - Division of the state: 1896
Succeeded by
Kengtung State; Muang Sing

Chiang Khaeng (Shan: ၵဵင်းၸဵင်; Thai: เชียงแขง), also known as Kengcheng or Kyaingchaing, was a Tai Lue state located on the border between modern-day Myanmar and Laos. In 1896, Chiang Khaeng was partitioned between the French and British colonial powers, its territory west of the Mekong river was incorporated into the neighbouring state of Kengtung under British Burma, while its territory east of the Mekong went to French Indochina.

== History ==
According to tradition, Chiang Khaeng was founded by Chao Fa Dek Noi, a young prince of Chiang Hung who had been exiled with a group of followers. Although there is no reliable data on the exact date of its founding, it most likely occurred in the 15th century. Chiang Khaeng initially had a close tributary relationship towards Chiang Hung, though by the beginning of the 16th century it had become a vassal state of Lan Na. Chiang Khaeng, like many of its neighbours, was conquered by King Bayinnaung in 1558 and made into a vassal state of Burma.

The original capital of Chiang Khaeng was located on the eastern bank of the Mekong river near its confluence with the Luai river. In 1858, the old capital of Chiang Khaeng was abandoned and transferred to Muang Yu. In 1885, the capital was moved again to Muang Sing.

Chiang Khaeng remained a tributary state of the kingdoms of Burma until 1887, when the Shan states submitted to British rule after the fall of the Konbaung dynasty.

In 1896, Chiang Khaeng was divided between British Burma and French Indochina with the Mekong as a border. The districts of the Cis-Mekong part of the state were merged with Kengtung State and the eastern districts, now the Muang Sing area, went first to Siam and then to the French. The limit between Kengtung and China was demarcated by an Anglo-Chinese commission in 1898–1899.

Sir George Scott mentioned the following about the Keng Cheng Myosa:

This was the unfortunate man who was told that he belonged to Siam and then that he didn't. Half his territory finally handed over to France.

=== Rulers ===
The rulers of Chiang Khaeng had the title Ngwegunhmu and by c. 1880, it changed to Myoza.

- 1372–1422 Sao Deik Nwe
- 1422–1438 Kai Kaew Wak Hpa
- 1438–1446 Sao Krue Maing (son of Kai Kaew Wak Hpa)
- 1446–1472 Sao Hai Khaing (son of Sao Krue Maing)
- 1472–1496 Möng Phrom Maha Inn (son of Sao Hai Khaing)
- 1496–1510 Hkun Muen Hua Pan Na Sai (son of Möng Phrom Maha Inn)
- 1510–1516 Hla Inn Hta (younger brother of Möng Phrom Maha Inn)
- 1516–1527 Hsen Inn Hta (younger brother of Hla Inn Hta)
- 1527–1537 Naw Kaew Phoumma (son of Hla Inn Hta)
- 1537–1555 Thippayajak (son of Hsen Inn Hta)
- 1555–1593 Haw Kham Nwe (son of Naw Kaew Phoumma)
- 1593–1615 Hpaya Hkon Luang (son of Haw Hkam Nwe)
- 1615–1640 Hpaya Waen Jeed Luang (son of Hpaya Hkon Luang)
- 1640–1657 Sao Hkam Mai (son of Hpaya Waen Jeed Luang)
- 1657–1670 Sao Hkam Sai (son of Sao Hkam Mai)
- 1670–1676 Sao Malai (younger brother of Sao Hkam Sai)
- 1676–1709 Hsari Naw Hseng Kaew (son of Sao Hkam Mai)
- 1709–1740 Suwanwongwad (son of Sao Malai)
- 1740–1755 Sao Kam Chai (son of Hsari Naw Hseng Kaew)
- 1755–1771 Sao Inn Torn (son of Sao Kam Chai)
- 1771–1795 Sao Sa Hlaing Ratn (younger brother of Sao Inn Torn)
- 1795–1813 Khattiyawongsa (son of Sao Sa Hlaing Ratn)
- 1813–1849 Hpaya Möng Hkon (son of Khattiyawongsa)
- 1849–1859 Tippani Hkam (son of Hpaya Möng Hkon)
- 1872–1881 Sao Kawng Tai (from Kengtung)
- 1881–1882 Sao Hsiri Naw Hkam (son of Tippani Hkam)
- 1882–1892 Sao Ong Hkam (son of Sao Hsiri Naw Hkam) last saopha
