= Luang Namtha Museum =

Museum in Luang Namtha, Laos

Coordinates: 21°00′21″N 101°24′29″E

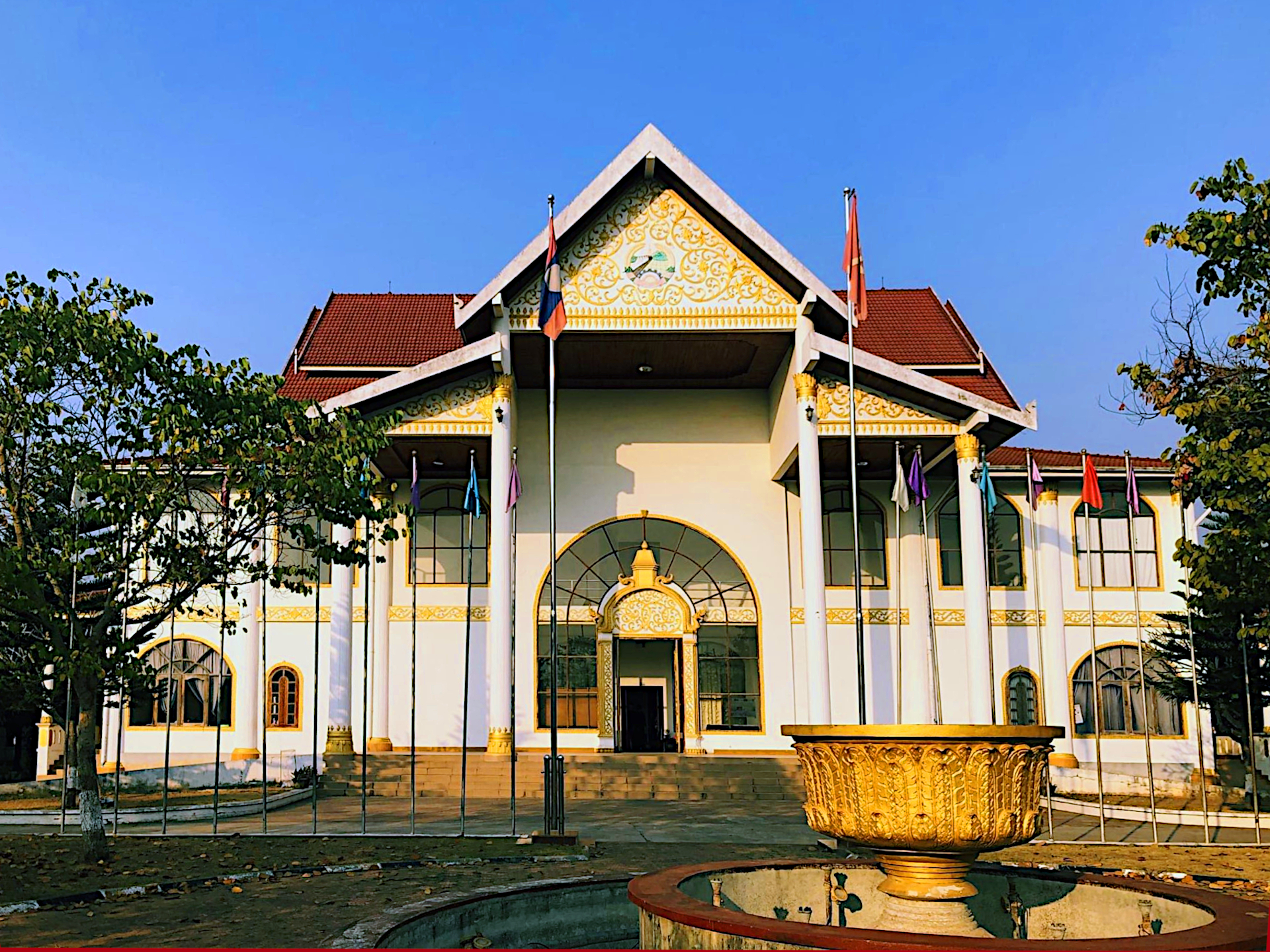
Luang Namtha Museum

Luang Namtha Museum, also Louang Namtha Provincial Museum, is a museum in Luang Namtha, Laos. Largely an anthropological museum, it contains numerous items related to local people such as ethnic clothing, Khamu bronze drums, textiles, ceramics, tools, household utensils, hand-crafted weapons, and Buddhism-related items.
