= Luang Namtha =

Capital of Luang Namtha province, Laos

Luang Namtha ຫລວງນໍ້າທາ
- District & municipality
- Namtha District
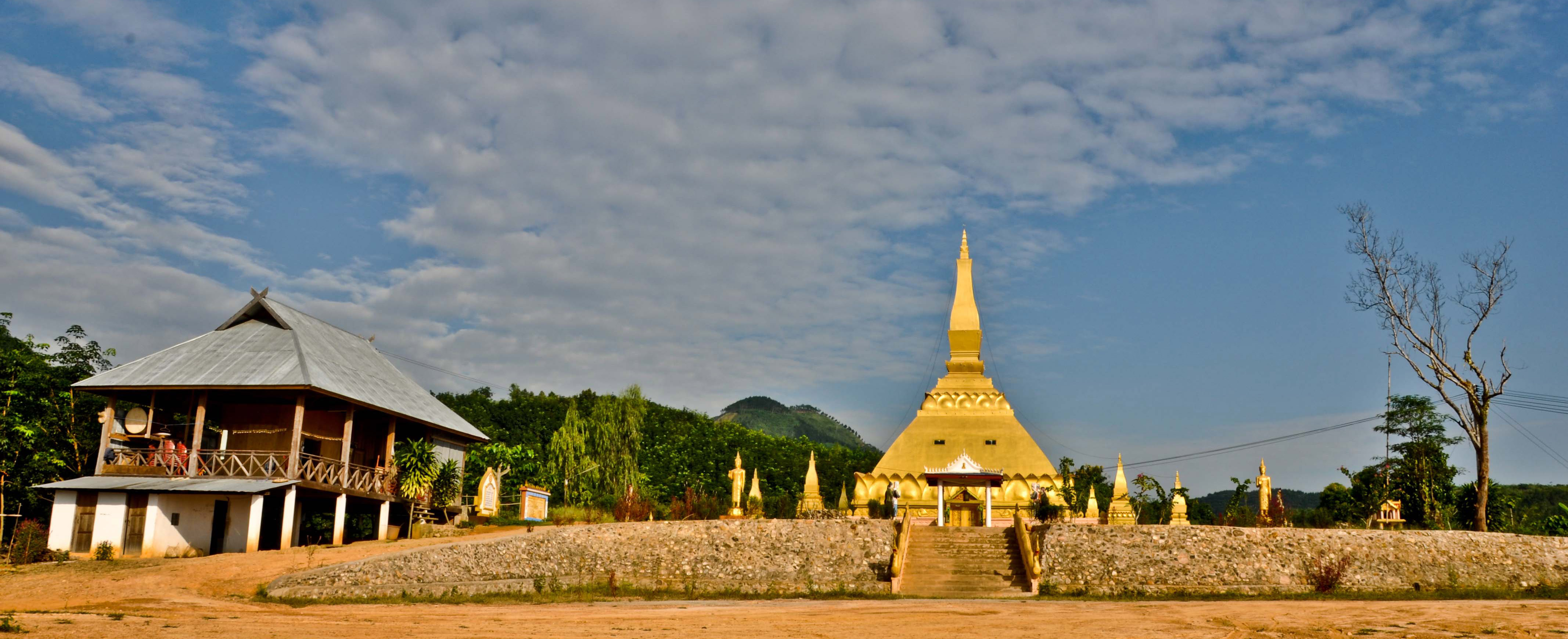

- Location in Laos
- Coordinates: 20°57′N 101°24′E
- Country: Laos
- Admin. division: Luang Namtha Province

Population (2015)
  - Total: 54,100
- Time zone: UTC+7 (ICT)

Luang Namtha (Luang Nam Tha) (Lao: ມ. ຫລວງນໍ້າທາ; Chinese: 琅南塔) is a district and the capital of Luang Namtha Province in northern Laos. The city lies on the Tha River (Nam Tha). The Luang Namtha Museum is in the town.

== History ==
Luang Namtha was previously named Muang Luang Phukha.

From January through May 1962, troops from the Royal Lao Army (RLA) fought the Pathet Lao and People's Army of Vietnam in the Battle of Luang Namtha. The battle ended with the RLA's headlong retreat southward 150 kilometers across the Mekong River.

== Climate ==
Climate data for Luang Namtha, elevation 552 m (1,811 ft), (1990–2019)
Month	Jan	Feb	Mar	Apr	May	Jun	Jul	Aug	Sep	Oct	Nov	Dec	Year
Record high °C (°F)	33.2 (91.8)	35.0 (95.0)	38.2 (100.8)	39.7 (103.5)	40.5 (104.9)	37.3 (99.1)	36.2 (97.2)	34.8 (94.6)	36.4 (97.5)	35.0 (95.0)	33.2 (91.8)	31.3 (88.3)	40.5 (104.9)
Mean daily maximum °C (°F)	26.2 (79.2)	28.9 (84.0)	31.0 (87.8)	32.3 (90.1)	31.4 (88.5)	31.1 (88.0)	30.0 (86.0)	30.1 (86.2)	30.5 (86.9)	29.6 (85.3)	27.6 (81.7)	25.2 (77.4)	29.5 (85.1)
Daily mean °C (°F)	19.3 (66.7)	20.5 (68.9)	22.8 (73.0)	25.4 (77.7)	26.2 (79.2)	27.0 (80.6)	26.4 (79.5)	26.4 (79.5)	26.2 (79.2)	24.8 (76.6)	22.0 (71.6)	19.4 (66.9)	23.9 (75.0)
Mean daily minimum °C (°F)	12.3 (54.1)	12.1 (53.8)	14.6 (58.3)	18.4 (65.1)	20.9 (69.6)	22.8 (73.0)	22.8 (73.0)	22.6 (72.7)	21.8 (71.2)	19.9 (67.8)	16.4 (61.5)	13.6 (56.5)	18.2 (64.7)
Record low °C (°F)	2.8 (37.0)	5.4 (41.7)	6.8 (44.2)	10.5 (50.9)	14.5 (58.1)	13.5 (56.3)	19.4 (66.9)	19.8 (67.6)	14.7 (58.5)	11.9 (53.4)	9.5 (49.1)	0.4 (32.7)	0.4 (32.7)
Average precipitation mm (inches)	26 (1.0)	24 (0.9)	56 (2.2)	108 (4.3)	201 (7.9)	190 (7.5)	294 (11.6)	307 (12.1)	172 (6.8)	94 (3.7)	58 (2.3)	31 (1.2)	1,561 (61.5)
Average relative humidity (%)	82.7	76.0	72.3	74.4	77.0	80.4	83.4	85.1	83.6	83.1	83.0	83.3	80.4
Mean monthly sunshine hours	164.3	181.1	193.5	179.3	193.7	134.3	117.0	122.8	150.7	158.8	153.8	149.6	1,898.9
Source 1: Food and Agriculture Organization of the United Nations
Source 2: NOAA (extremes); SeaDelt (humidity and sun 2016–2022)

== Transport ==
=== Road ===
It is connected by Highway 3 to the Thai border at Houayxay-Chiang Khong (197 km (122 mi)), the Chinese border at Boten-Mengla County (60 km (37 mi)), and the Burmese border at Xieng Kok-Kenglat.

=== Air ===
Luang Namtha is served by Louang Namtha Airport, 6 km (3.7 mi) south of the city.

=== Rail ===
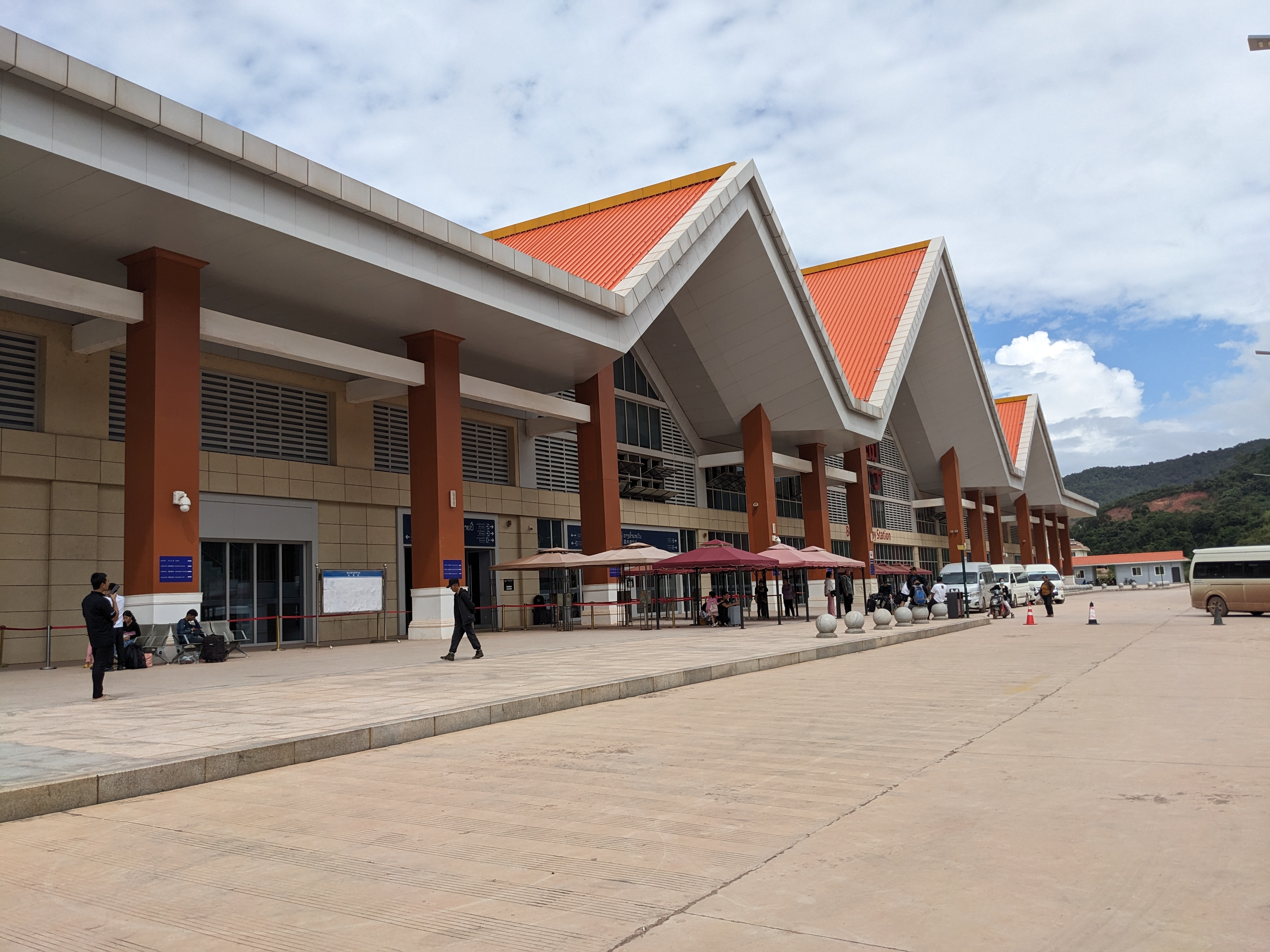
Boten railway station

It has 2 railway stations which served by Boten-Vientiane railway: Nateuy railway station at Nateuy and Boten railway station at Boten.

== Gallery ==
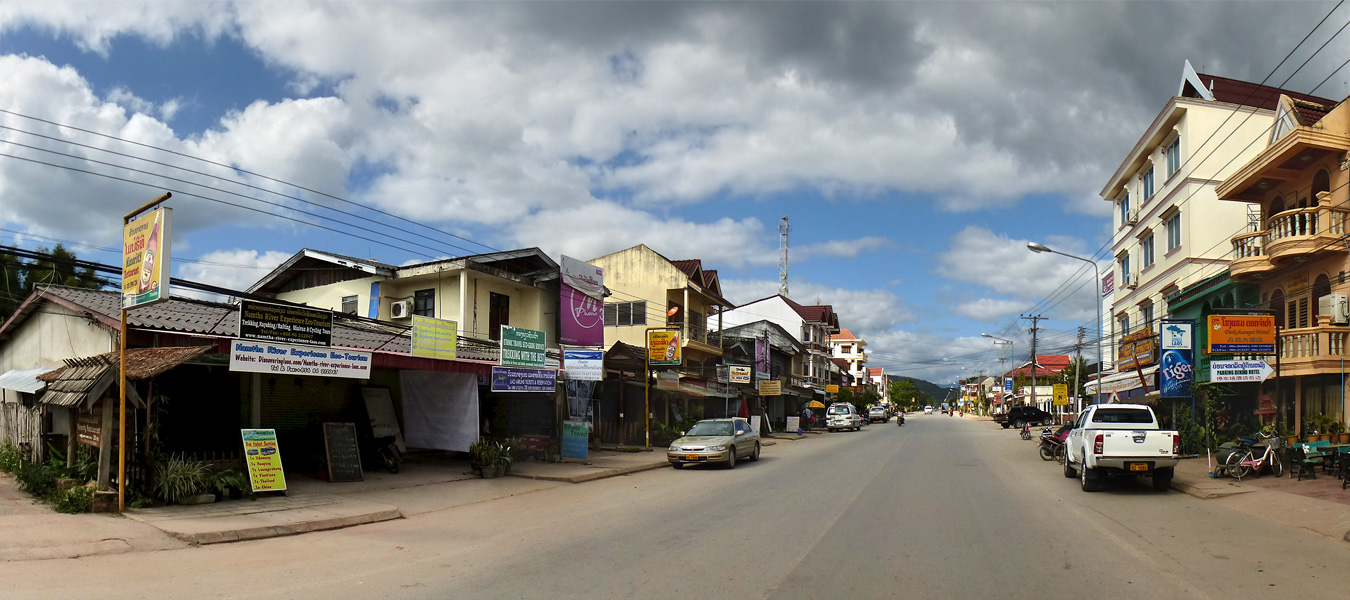
Luang Namtha centre
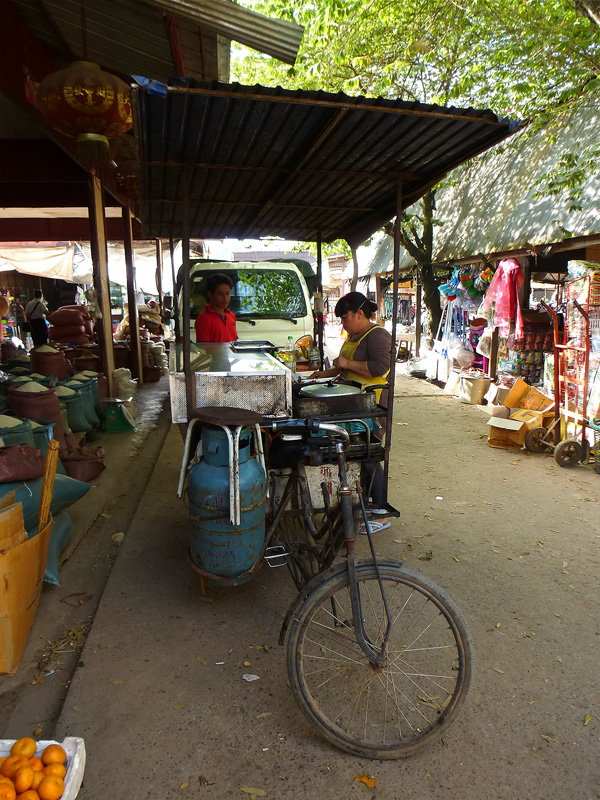
Day market

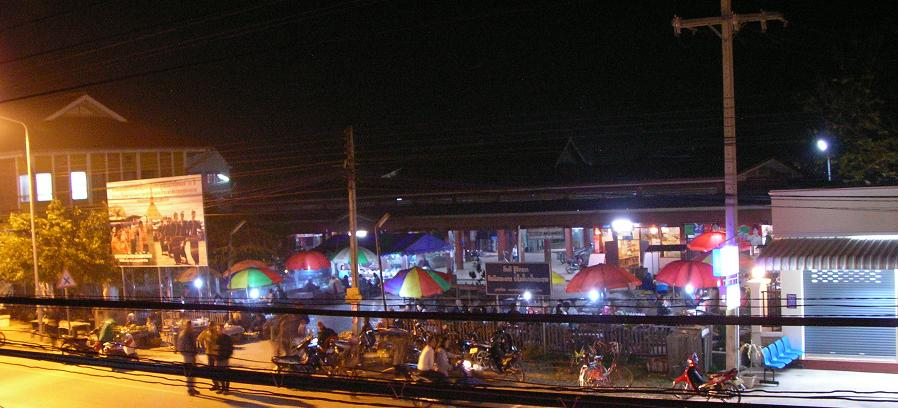
Night market

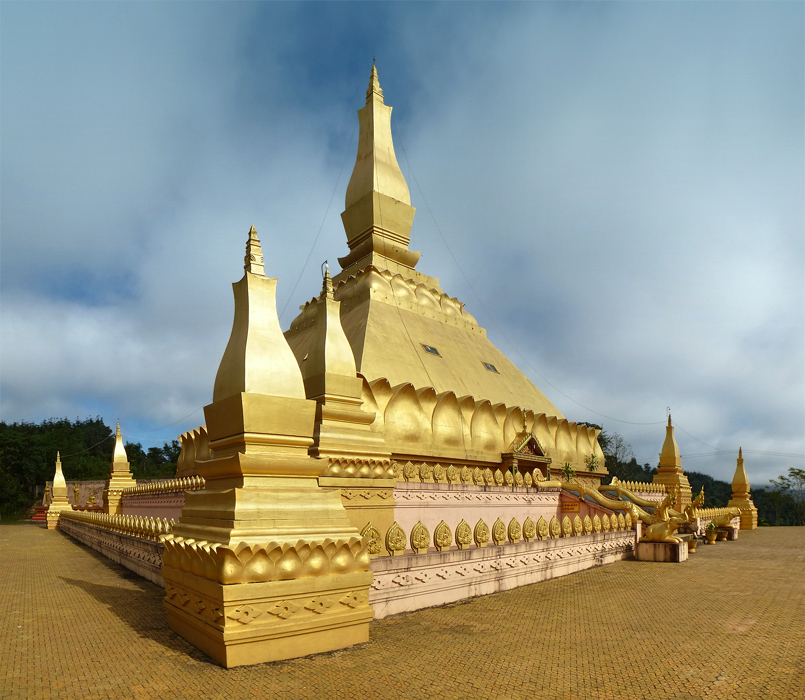
Luang Namtha stupa

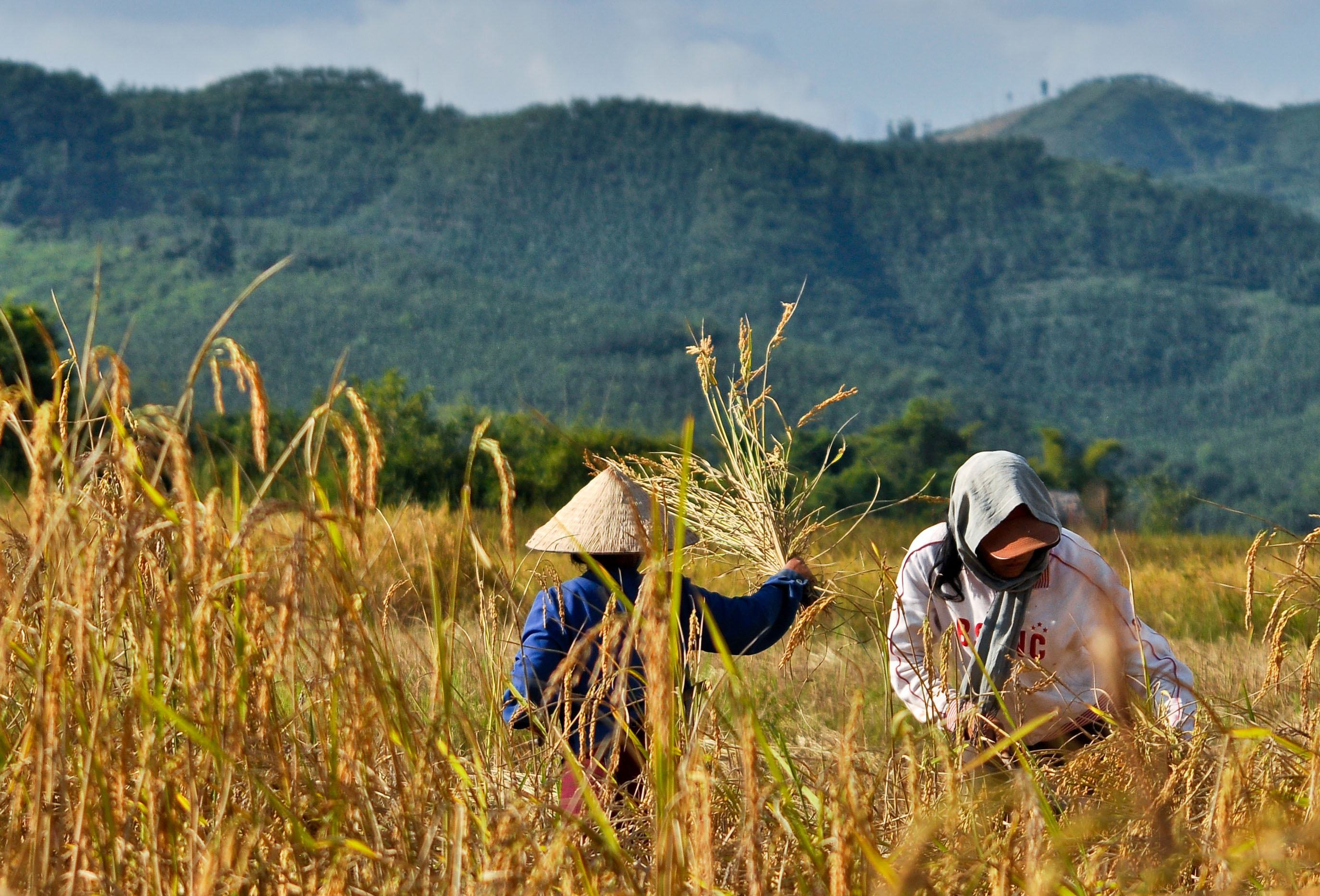
Harvesting rice

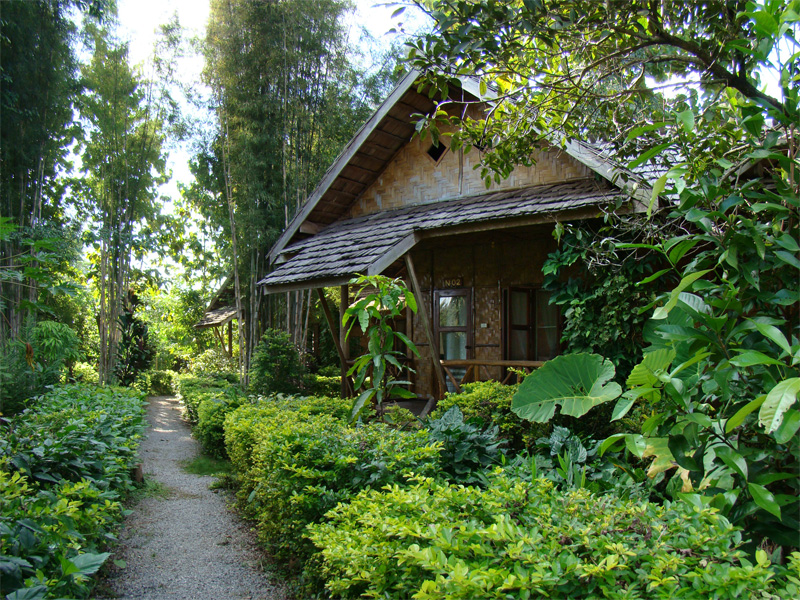
Riverside guesthouse
