= Long district, Laos =

Long district ເມືອງລອງ
- District
- Interactive map of Long district
- Country: Laos
- Province: Luang Namtha province

Population (2015)
  - Total: 34,630
- Time zone: UTC+7 (ICT)

Long is a district (muang) of Luang Namtha province in northwestern Laos.
