= Paodon =

- Village
- Location in Laos
- Coordinates: 18°41′3″N 103°47′3″E
- Country: Laos
- Province: Bolikhamsai Province
- District: Borikhane District

Paodon is a river village in Bolikhamsai Province, in western Laos. It is the located in Borikhane District along the Nam Xan River, northeast of Borikham, north of Hatkhiphong and southeast of Muang Huong.
