= Nam Kading National Protected Area =

National protected area in Bolikhamsai Province, Laos

- IUCN category VI (protected area with sustainable use of natural resources)
- Location within Laos
- Location: Bolikhamsai Province, Laos
- Nearest city: Paksan
- Coordinates: 18°24′28″N 104°14′25″E
- Area: 1,690 km^{2} (650 sq mi) (decreed), 1,570–1,584 km^{2} (606–612 sq mi) (actual)
- Designated: 29 October 1993

Nam Kading National Protected Area is a national protected area in Bolikhamsai Province in central Laos. This rugged and largely inaccessible park, cut through by its namesake Nam Kading river, is home to a wide variety of plant and animal species, some endangered. Due to its ruggedness, the park lacks any significant human settlement.

== Geography ==
Nam Kading National Protected Area is located about 40 kilometres (25 mi) east of Paksan near the village of Pakkading and covers parts of Paksan, Pakkading, Borikhane and Khamkeut districts. The park's current area is about 1,600 square kilometres (620 sq mi). Elevations range from about 140 metres (460 ft) to the park's highest point, Phou Pa Paek at 1,514 metres (4,970 ft).

The park's main river is the Nam Kading, flowing from south to north through the park. It is a significant tributary of the Mekong. The Nam Theun 2 Dam, Laos's largest hydroelectric project, impounds the Nam Kading south of the park in Khammouane Province. The courses of three other rivers, the Nam Muan, Nam Sat and Nam Tek, divide the park into four mountain ranges.

== History ==
Beginning in 1989, the area of the current park was surveyed by air and land. In 1993 Nam Kading National Biodiversity Conservation Area was decreed. Surveying began in 1995 to assess the impact on the park of two further proposed hydropower projects: Theun-Hinboun and Nam Theun 1.

== Flora and fauna ==
The park's main forest types are evergreen forest dry mixed deciduous forest. Native forests in Nam Kading cover 84% of the park area. A study for the proposed hydropower projects identified 256 plant species in the park. Included were two rare species: Lagerstroemia balansae and Justicia gendarussa.

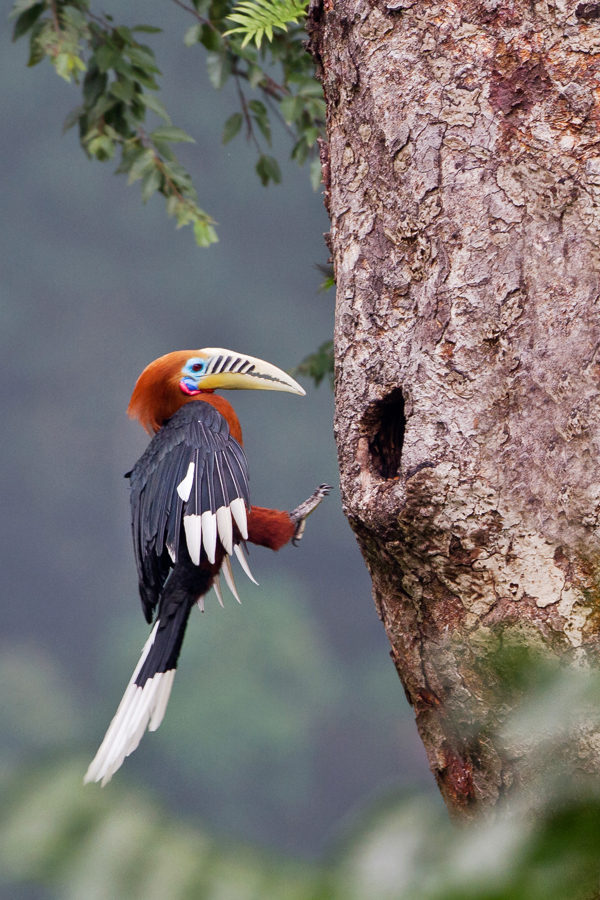
Rufous-necked hornbill

The native forests of Nam Kading host a large variety of animals and birds, including endangered species. At least 43 mammal species and 234 bird species have been catalogued. Animal species include both northern and southern white-cheeked gibbon, sun bear, gaur, tiger, elephant and giant muntjac.

Endangered bird species include great hornbill, rufous-necked hornbill, green peafowl and Vietnamese crested argus. Other bird species include wire-tailed swallow, wreathed hornbill, river lapwing, sooty babbler and rufous-throated fulvetta. One species is unique in Laos to Nam Kading: the pale-capped pigeon.

== Environment ==
Nam Kading faces a number of environmental threats. The most significant is from the effects of current and future hydropower projects. The current Theun-Hinboun project has reduced the flow of the Nam Kading river. The Nam Theun 1 project would flood an area of 40 square kilometres (15 sq mi) within the park, causing biodiversity loss and separating habitats. Hunting of wildlife by locals is currently a threat and is expected to increase if the Nam Theun 1 project finishes, as easier boat access to the park interior would become possible.
