= Hatkhiphong =

- Village
- Location in Laos
- Coordinates: 18°38′12″N 103°48′21″E
- Country: Laos
- Province: Bolikhamsai Province
- District: Borikhane District

Hatkhiphong is a river village in Bolikhamsai Province, in western Laos. It is the located in Borikhane District along the Nam Xan River, east of Borikham and south of Paodon.
