= Cheng Sayavong =

Laotian general and businessman

General Cheng Sayavong (died 2015) was a Laotian businessman, government minister, and general of the Lao People's Armed Forces.

Cheng served as Director of the military-run Mountainous Areas Development Company from 1984 to 1996, effectively controlling the region surrounding the city of Lak Sao, and later became Vice Minister of Commerce and Chairman of the Laotian National Tourism Administration until his retirement in 2002.

== Career ==
Cheng originally served as part of the Royal Lao Army, attaining the rank of Colonel, until he defected in 1963 to become a commander of the Patriotic Neutralists on the Communist side of the Laotian Civil War. Subsequently, he became a General in the Lao People's Army.

In 1984, the LPA established the Mountainous Areas Development Company (Bolisat Phatthana Khet Phudoi or BPKP) as a forestry company, and Cheng became its director. As Director of the BPKP, Cheng effectively controlled the region surrounding the BPKP's headquarters in Lak Sao (literally "Kilometre 20"), near the Laos–Vietnam border, and the BPKP grew to encompass many different varieties of economic activity in the region. Lak Xao consequently grew into a significant municipality. During Cheng's tenure at BPKP, it controlled roughly half of the forestry industry in Laos and was responsible for logging endangered trees such as the Honduras mahogany. Cheng officially resigned from this position in 1997.

In 1986, Cheng established a zoo in Lak Sao despite a recent government ban on trade in wildlife. Cheng became a leading wildlife trader in Laos, with a particular interest in rare animals. He contributed to conservation by establishing a conservation center for tigers at Lak Xao in conjunction with the American nonprofit Carnivore Protection Trust, but was also criticised for hunting and eating critically endangered species.

In 1998, Cheng was appointed Vice Minister of Commerce and Tourism and Chairman of the National Tourism Administration. He served in these roles until his retirement in 2002, when BPKP was placed under the Laotian Ministry of Finance.

Cheng became the owner of Lao Star TV, the first private television station in Laos, in 2010.

He died in 2015.
