= Na Hom, Bolikhamsai Province, Laos =

Na Hom
- Village
- Location in Laos
- Coordinates: 18°27′44″N 103°47′2″E
- Country: Laos
- Province: Bolikhamsai Province
- District: Paksan District

Na Hom is a small village in Bolikhamsai Province, in western Laos. It lies in Paksan District, to the east by road from Paksan and Nong Boua on the road to Na Khaulom
