= Lak Sao =

Lak Sao Lakxao, Ban Lak Xao
- town
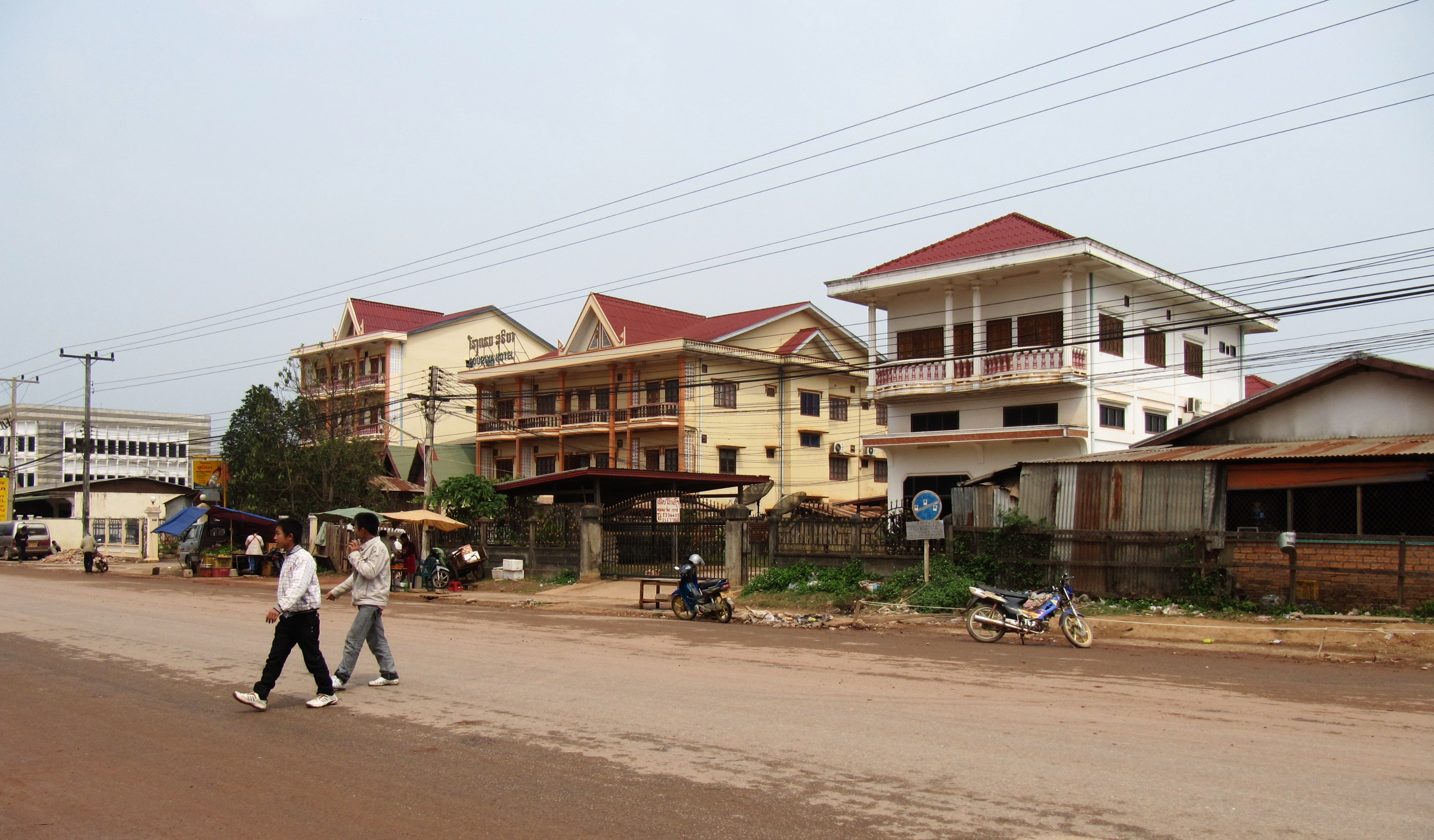
- The main street of Lak Sao

- Location in Laos
- Coordinates: 18°11′38″N 104°58′17″E
- Country: Laos
- Province: Bolikhamsai
- District: Khamkeut

Population (2015)
  - Total: 19,178

Lak Sao (Lakxao, Ban Lak Xao) is a town in Khamkeut District, Bolikhamsai Province, of central Laos. It sits along Lao National Route 8, 20 kilometres (12 mi) from the Vietnamese border.

Lak Sao was the site of the Battle of Lak Sao during the Laotian Civil War, and is also known for its forestry industry, having been the headquarters location of the military-run Mountainous Areas Development Company since the 1980s.

== Etymology ==
The town is alternatively spelled Lakxao or Ban Lak Xao. "Lak Sao" means "Kilometer 20" in Laos; the town was so named due to its proximity along National Route 8 to the Laos–Vietnam border. It is denoted as "B. Lak 20" on Laotian topographic maps.

== Geography ==
Lak Sao is located at the major crossroads where Route 1E comes from the south, and the AH15, as Lao National Route 8, comes from the border with Vietnam to the northeast. The AH15 continues west to Thailand. It has historically been surrounded by forest, making forestry a significant portion of its economy.

Wastewater from Lak Sao is discharged into the Nam Phao River, a tributary of the Nam Theun; the town is 20 kilometres (12 mi) from the Nam Theun 2 Dam and 60 kilometres (37 mi) from the dam's power station.

== History ==
=== Laotian Civil War ===
Between November 1963 and January 1964, the Laotian army fought the North Vietnamese at the Battle of Lak Sao as part of the Laotian Civil War and the Vietnam War.

Lak Sao at this time was held by the communist faction in the Civil War; in an attempt to support South Vietnam, General Phoumi Nosavan of the Royal Lao Army in conjunction with the Neutralist Armed Forces decided to mount an operation along Route 8 from Nhommarath to Lak Sao, from which they would strike into Vietnam along the Nape Pass. The coalition forces successfully occupied Lak Sao by the end of November 1963, but their further push was defeated by the People's Army of Vietnam in conjunction with Pathet Lao guerrillas, forcing the coalition forces to bring in paratroopers to cover their retreat along Route 8. Ultimately, Lak Sao returned to the hands of the communist faction.

=== Postwar ===
Population of Lak Sao
Census year	Population
2005	15,736
2015	19,178

In 1984, the Lao People's Army established the Mountainous Areas Development Company (Bolisat Phatthana Khet Phudoi or BPKP) as a forestry company with Lak Sao as its headquarters. Its director, General Cheng Sayavong, effectively controlled the region surrounding Lak Sao, and the BPKP grew to encompass many different varieties of economic activity in the region. In 1986, Cheng established a zoo in Lak Sao despite a recent government ban on trade in wildlife. He established a conservation center for tigers in the town, in conjunction with the American nonprofit Carnivore Protection Trust. Lak Sao consequently grew into a significant municipality, reaching 12,000 population by the 1990s, and becoming a center of both the forestry and wildlife trade industries.

In the 21st century, improvements to Route 8 and increasing cross-border trade have given Lak Sao a significant growth rate of approximately 3% per year.
