= Nong Boua, Bolikhamsai =

Nong Boua
- Village
- Location in Laos
- Coordinates: 18°26′7″N 103°46′15″E
- Country: Laos
- Province: Bolikhamsai Province
- District: Paksan District

Nong Boua is a village in Bolikhamsai Province, in western Laos. It lies in Paksan District, to the east by road from Paksan on the road to Na Hom and Na Khaulom.
