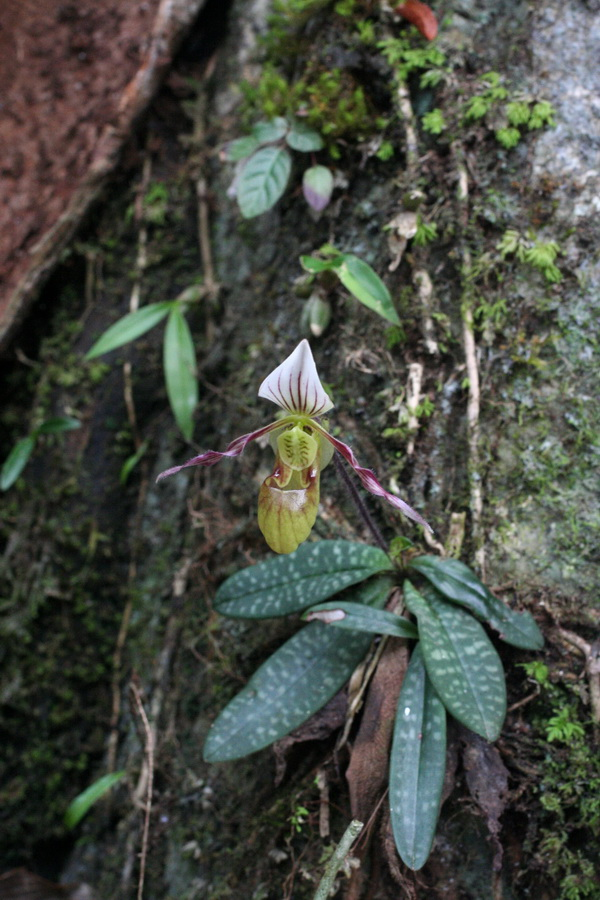
- Paphiopedilum canhii in flower in situ

Conservation status
- Critically Endangered (IUCN 3.1)

Scientific classification
- Kingdom: Plantae
- Clade: Embryophytes
- Clade: Tracheophytes
- Clade: Angiosperms
- Clade: Monocots
- Order: Asparagales
- Family: Orchidaceae
- Subfamily: Cypripedioideae
- Genus: Paphiopedilum
- Subgenus: Paphiopedilum subg. Megastaminodium
- Species: P. canhii

Binomial name
- Paphiopedilum canhii Aver. & O.Gruss (2010)

Synonyms
- Paphiopedilum canhii var. funingense Z.J.Liu & L.J.Chen

= Paphiopedilum canhii =

Species of orchid

Paphiopedilum canhii is an Asian species of slipper orchid and the type species of the subgenus Paphiopedilum subg. Megastaminodium, available in Vietnam, Laos, and southern China.

== Taxonomy ==
The species is named after Canh Chu Xuan, a local service officer who received the plants in November 2009 from the H'Mong (Meo) people. The plants were brought into his office of Civilian Governmental Service for Care of Natural Resources and Connections with Local Minorities for further study and description, and after several months in the nursery, the plant flowered in April 2010. Its unusual characteristics had been recorded a year before in local markets by orchid growers in Điện Biên and Sơn La. In 2014, the species was designated with its own Paphiopedilum subgenus, Megastaminodium, due to its distinct characteristics that makes it unfit for other subgenera.

== Description ==
P. canhii consists of 3 to 5 leaves measuring 3–5 centimetres (1.2–2.0 in) long, being distinctly tessellated light and darker green at its upper surface. Its erect inflorescence consists of a single flower measuring 6–8 centimetres (2.4–3.1 in) across, with peak flowering occurs in March and April.

== Distribution ==
P. canhii was originally discovered in the 2010 description at northwestern Vietnam, specifically from one locality along the border with Laos at Dien Bien province, where it grows at rocky limestone at elevations around 1,500 metres (4,900 ft). Further explorations discovered P. cahnii at the Phou Phachao Mountain in Laos. A Chinese variant, P. canhii var. funingense, was discovered in Funing County, Yunnan in 2013.

== Conservation status ==
P. canhii is critically endangered in the wild, mainly due to poaching and habitat destruction. The region where the species occurs is a distinct and significant center of Paphiopedilum speciation and diversity. As a result, the area has been a priority not only for botanical exploration but also for ruthless collection for horticultural purposes.

In 2015, the range for this species was estimated at 4 km^{2} with less than 10 mature individuals remaining in the wild.
