= Cyrtodactylus teyniei =

Conservation status
- Data Deficient (IUCN 3.1)

Scientific classification
- Kingdom: Animalia
- Phylum: Chordata
- Class: Reptilia
- Order: Squamata
- Suborder: Gekkota
- Family: Gekkonidae
- Genus: Cyrtodactylus
- Species: C. teyniei

Binomial name
- Cyrtodactylus teyniei David, T.Q. Nguyen, Schneider & Ziegler, 2011

Species of lizard

Cyrtodactylus teyniei is a species of gecko, a lizard in the family Gekkonidae. The species is endemic to Laos.

== Etymology ==
The specific name, teyniei, is in honor of French herpetologist Alexandre Teynié, who collected the holotype.

== Geographic range ==
C. teyniei is found in central Laos, in Borikhamxay Province.

== Habitat ==
The preferred natural habitats of C. teyniei are forest and dry caves.

== Description ==
C. teyniei may attain a snout-to-vent length (SVL) of 9 cm (3.5 in).

== Reproduction ==
The mode of reproduction of C. teyniei is unknown.
