= Na Khaulom =

- Village
- Location in Laos
- Coordinates: 18°29′16″N 103°49′13″E
- Country: Laos
- Province: Bolikhamsai Province
- District: Paksan District
- Time zone: UTC+7 (ICT)

Na Khaulom (Ban Na Khaulom) is a village in Bolikhamsai Province, in western Laos. It lies in Paksan District, to the east by road from Nong Boua and Pakxan near the border with Thailand. Na Khaulom is the eastern point of the road leading out of Pakxan. At Na Khaulom, the road splits north–south. The small town of Borikham lies to the north.
