= Crucihammus grossepunctatus =

Scientific classification
- Kingdom: Animalia
- Phylum: Arthropoda
- Clade: Pancrustacea
- Class: Insecta
- Order: Coleoptera
- Suborder: Polyphaga
- Infraorder: Cucujiformia
- Family: Cerambycidae
- Genus: Crucihammus
- Species: C. grossepunctatus

Binomial name
- Crucihammus grossepunctatus (Breuning, 1964)

Synonyms
- Cyriepepeotes grossepunctatus Breuning, 1964

Species of beetle

Crucihammus grossepunctatus is a species of beetle in the family Cerambycidae. It was described by Stephan von Breuning in 1964. It is known from central Laos (Phou Khao Khouay, Pakkading).

Crucihammus grossepunctatus measure 18–20 mm (0.71–0.79 in) in length.
