= Na Hom =

Na Hom (Thai: นาห่อม) is the name of several places in Thailand and Laos.

- Na Hom, Bolikhamsai Province, Laos, village in Laos
- Na Hom, Thung Si Udom, subdistrict in Thailand, or a village within the subdistrict
