= Crucihammus =

Scientific classification
- Kingdom: Animalia
- Phylum: Arthropoda
- Class: Insecta
- Order: Coleoptera
- Suborder: Polyphaga
- Infraorder: Cucujiformia
- Family: Cerambycidae
- Tribe: Lamiini
- Genus: Crucihammus

Genus of beetles

Crucihammus is a genus of longhorn beetles of the subfamily Lamiinae.

== Species List ==
- Crucihammus grossepunctatus (Breuning, 1964)
- Crucihammus laosicus (Breuning, 1965)
- Crucihammus subcruciatus Breuning, 1936
- Crucihammus sumatranus Breuning, 1954
