= Laos–Vietnam relations =

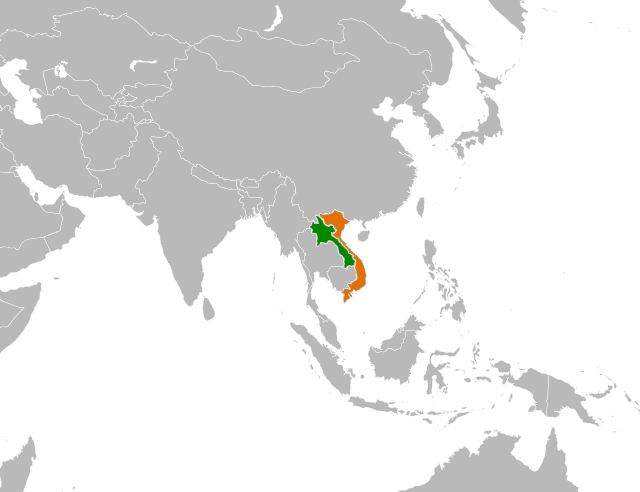
- Laos: Vietnam

Diplomatic mission
- Embassy of Laos, Hanoi: Embassy of Vietnam, Vientiane

Envoy
- Laos Ambassador to Vietnam Khamphao Ernthavanh: Vietnam Ambassador to Laos Nguyễn Minh Tâm

Laos–Vietnam relations (Vietnamese: Quan hệ Lào – Việt Nam, Laotian: ການພົວພັນ ລາວ-ຫວຽດນາມ) are the traditional friendship, special solidarity and comprehensive cooperation from history to the present between the Lao People's Democratic Republic and Socialist Republic of Vietnam. The relationship is considered by the Communist Party of Vietnam and the Lao People's Revolutionary Party as well as the State of the two countries as a special relationship with the role of strategic allies but without any alliance commitments.

== History ==
=== Antiquity and medieval era ===
Laos and Vietnam share a common border and consequently have had a very complicated relationship. Laotian kingdoms often clashed with Vietnamese dynasties and sometimes these clashes would evolve into wars. Several border conflicts and territorial disputes would arise, but the most notable of these was the Vietnamese invasion of Laos in the late 15th century. The Vietnamese Later Lê dynasty invaded and devastated Laos for nearly two years. The Vietnamese subsequently retreated over a span of 10 years (between 1480 and 1490). The Vietnamese would not return to Laos for 200 years thereafter. However, the Vietnamese invasion damaged Laos heavily and made it seriously weakened. Laos could not resist future Vietnamese incursions into the country, despite the fact that they had fostered closer ties with the Ayutthaya Kingdom.

=== Modern era ===
Kingdom of Laos–North Vietnam relations
- Laos: North Vietnam

Kingdom of Laos–South Vietnam relations
- Laos: South Vietnam

In 1930, the Communist Party of Vietnam (CPV) was founded by Ho Chi Minh under French colonial rule in Indochina. In 1951, the Kampuchean People's Revolutionary Party (KPRP) was established on 28 June 1951, which will later come to power on 7 January 1979 after the Cambodian genocide and Angkar's reign of terror by Pol Pot with its brutal Maoist backings of China. Laotian modern relations with Vietnam had secretly set the strategy for the Lao People's Revolutionary Party (LPRP) during the struggle to achieve power, and the "sudden" opportunity to establish the Lao People's Democratic Republic in 1975 left no leeway to consider foreign policy alignments other than a continuation of the "special relations" with Vietnam. The relationship cultivated in the revolutionary stage predisposed Laos to Indochinese solidarity in the reconstruction and "socialist construction" phases and all but ensured that relations or alignments with China and Thailand would be wary and potentially unfriendly. Further, the LPRP, unlike the Cambodian communists under Pol Pot, was far too accustomed to accepting Vietnamese advice to consider striking out on its own. The final seizure of power by the hitherto secret LPRP in 1975 brought both a public acknowledgement of the previously hidden North Vietnamese guidance of the party and genuine expressions of gratitude by the LPRP to its Vietnamese partners. The challenge facing the ruling group—the construction of a socialist society—was seen as a natural extension of past collaboration with North Vietnam. The revolution was simply entering a new phase in 1975, and the LPRP leaders congratulated themselves upon ousting the "imperialists" and looked forward to advice and economic as well as military support, which was not available from any neighbor or counter revolutionary state.

LPRP leaders were accustomed to discussing policies as well as studying doctrine in Hanoi. They formalized governmental contacts with their mentors at biannual meetings of the foreign ministers of Cambodia, Laos, and Vietnam starting in 1980 and through the joint Vietnam-Laos Cooperative Commission, which met annually to review progress of various projects. Other levels of cooperation between Laos and Vietnam existed, for example, party-to-party meetings and province-to-province exchanges, as well as mass organizations for youths and women. Meetings of the commission were held regularly.

The primary channels for Vietnam's influence in Laos, however, were the LPRP and the LPA. In the LPRP, long-standing collaboration and consultation at the very top made special committees unnecessary, whereas in the LPA, the Vietnamese advisers, instructors, and troops on station constituted a pervasive, inescapable influence, even though they scrupulously avoided public exposure by sticking to their designated base areas. Cooperation in the military field was probably the most extensive, with logistics, training, and communications largely supplied by Vietnam throughout the 1970s and 1980s (heavy ordnance and aircraft were provided by the Soviet Union).

In July 1977, Laos and Vietnam signed a 25-year Treaty of Friendship which defined the relationship between the two as a "special relationship". The treaty legitimated the presence of Vietnamese soldiers in Laos and established preferential trade terms for Vietnam. Another element of cooperation involved hundreds of Vietnamese advisers who mentored their Laotian counterparts in virtually all the ministries in Vientiane. Hundreds of LPRP stalwarts and technicians studied in institutes of Marxism–Leninism or technical schools in Hanoi.

The resources that Vietnam was able to bestow upon its revolutionary partner, however, were severely limited by the physical destruction of war and the deadening orthodoxy of its economic structures and policies. However, it could put in a good word for its Laotian partners with the Soviet Union, which in turn could recommend economic assistance projects to its East European satellite states. Yet, Vietnam's influence on Laos was determined by economic assistance and ideology as well as by geographical and historical proximity. The two nations fit together, as the leaders liked to say, "like lips and teeth." Vietnam provided landlocked Laos a route to the sea, and the mountainous region of eastern Laos provided Vietnam a forward strategic position for challenging Thai hegemony in the Mekong Valley.

During the 1980s, Vietnam's regional opponents attributed to it a neo-colonial ambition to create an "Indochina Federation." This phrase can be found in early pronouncements of the ICP in its struggle against the French colonial structures in Indochina. The charge, exaggerated as it was, lost its currency once Vietnam withdrew its troops from Cambodia in 1989 and subsequently from Laos. Laos's dependence on Vietnam since 1975 could then be perceived as a natural extension of their collaboration and solidarity in revolution rather than as domination by Vietnam.

With the departure of Vietnamese military forces—except for some construction engineers—and the passing of most senior Vietnamese revolutionary partners, the magnetism of the special relationship lost its grip. Further, Vietnam was never able to muster large-scale economic aid programs. It launched only 200 assistance projects between 1975 and 1985, whereas the Soviet Union generated considerably more in the way of contributions. In 1992 the long-standing Vietnamese ambassador to Laos, a veteran of fourteen years' service, characterized the relationship as composed "d'amitié et de coopération multiforme entre les pays" (of friendship and diverse cooperation between the two countries). This pronouncement was far less compelling than the "objective law of existence and development" formulation sometimes expressed in the past.

Although Vietnam's historical record of leadership in the revolution and its military power and proximity will not cease to exist, Laos struck out ahead of Vietnam with its New Economic Mechanism to introduce market mechanisms into its economy. In doing so, Laos has opened the door to rapprochement with Thailand and China at some expense to its special dependence on Vietnam. Laos might have reached the same point of normalization in following Vietnam's economic and diplomatic change, but by moving ahead resolutely and responding to Thai and Chinese gestures, Laos has broadened its range of donors, trading partners, and investors independent of Vietnam's attempts to accomplish the same goal. Thus, Vietnam remains in the shadows as a mentor and emergency ally, and the tutelage of Laos has shifted dramatically to development banks and international entrepreneurs.

Laos was a site of the Ho Chi Minh trail used by North Vietnam. Laos was also bombed by South Vietnamese and American forces due to North Vietnamese occupation of eastern Laos. Laos contains Vietnamese soldiers stationed there since Vietnam and Laos signed a treaty to create a united sphere and to support repair after the Laotian Civil War. Due to its dominance during the 19th century Vietnam regards Cambodia and Laos as vassal tributary states. Overseas Laotian opposition regard the Laotian government as a stooge of Vietnam.

== Bilateral relations and commerce ==
Since Laos passed the foreign investment promotion law in 1989 until 2012, Vietnam has invested in total 429 projects with a combined value of US$4.9 billion, and currently the largest foreign investor in Laos.

The two countries' bilateral trade was about US$725 million at the end of 2012.

== Diplomatic missions ==
Vietnam established diplomatic relationship with Laos in 1962.

Of Vietnam

- Vientiane (Embassy)
- Luang Prabang (Consulate)
- Pakse (Consulate)
- Savannakhet (Consulate)

Of Laos

- Hanoi (Embassy)
- Ho Chi Minh City (Consulate)
- Da Nang (Consulate)

== See also ==
- Laos–Vietnam border
