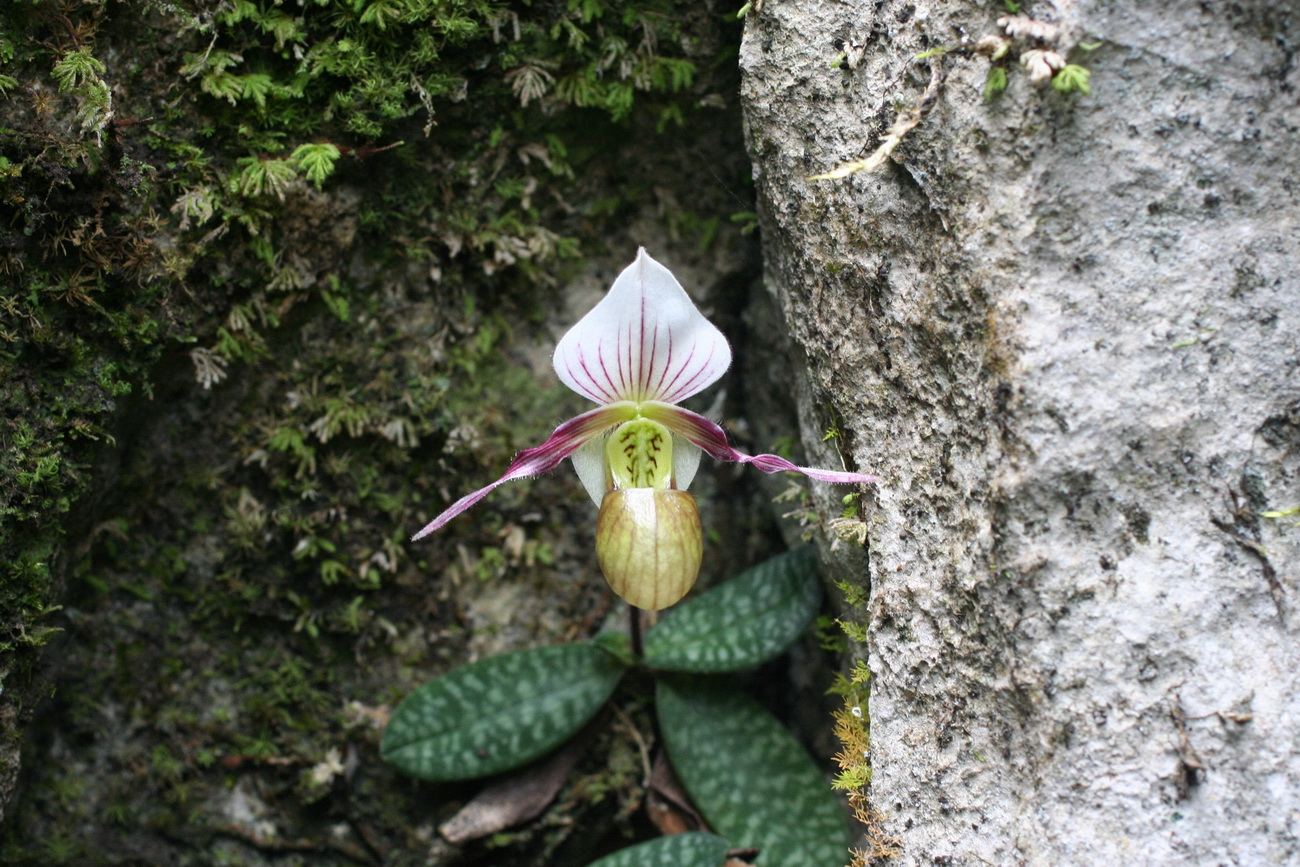
- Paphiopedilum canhii in flower in situ

Scientific classification
- Kingdom: Plantae
- Clade: Tracheophytes
- Clade: Angiosperms
- Clade: Monocots
- Order: Asparagales
- Family: Orchidaceae
- Subfamily: Cypripedioideae
- Genus: Paphiopedilum
- Subgenus: Paphiopedilum subg. Megastaminodium; Braem & O. Gruss

Type species
- Paphiopedilum canhii

Species
- Paphiopedilum canhii Aver. & O.Gruss

= Paphiopedilum subg. Megastaminodium =

Subgenus of flowering plants

Paphiopedilum subgenus Megastaminodium is a subgenus of the orchid genus Paphiopedilum. It was erected to accommodate the single species Paphiopedilum canhii due to its distinct characteristics that made it unfit for the other subgenera. Its placement has since been backed by cytological, molecular and micromorphological evidence.

== Distribution ==
Plants from this subgenus are found in rocky limestone massifs situated in the Kasi district of Vientiane Province of central Laos and a second population 180 km NNW in North-Vietnam at the Laotian border.

== Species ==
Paphiopedilum subgenus Megastaminodium comprises the following species:

Image	Name	Distribution	Elevation (m)
	Paphiopedilum canhii Aver. & O.Gruss 2010	Laos	600–800 metres (2,000–2,600 ft)
