= Crucihammus laosicus =

Scientific classification
- Kingdom: Animalia
- Phylum: Arthropoda
- Class: Insecta
- Order: Coleoptera
- Suborder: Polyphaga
- Infraorder: Cucujiformia
- Family: Cerambycidae
- Genus: Crucihammus
- Species: C. laosicus

Binomial name
- Crucihammus laosicus (Breuning, 1965)

Synonyms
- Cyriotasastes laosicus Breuning, 1965

Species of beetle

Crucihammus laosicus is a species of beetle in the family Cerambycidae. It was described by Stephan von Breuning in 1965.
