= National Tourism Administration (Laos) =

Government agency in Laos

The Lao National Tourism Administration (LNTA) is the government agency responsible for managing, promoting, and developing the tourism under the Ministry of Finance. The LNTA is a ministry-level agency, reporting directly to the prime minister's office.

As of 2008, the chairman of the LNTA was Somphong Mongkhonvilay. LNTA's headquarters is in Vientiane.

== See also ==
- Government of Laos
- Tourism in Laos
