= Laos–Vietnam border =

International border

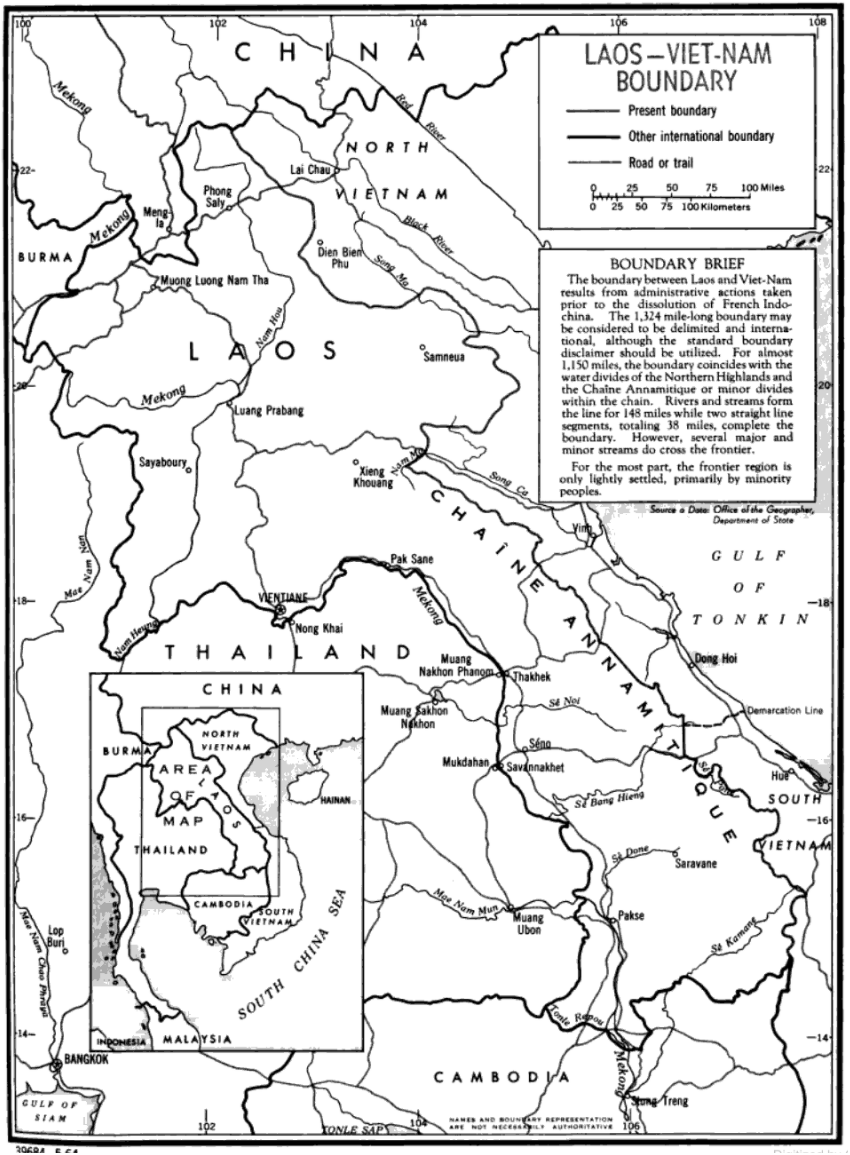
Map of the Laos-Vietnam border

Laotian and Vietnamese boundary markers

The Laos–Vietnam border is the international border between the territory of Laos and Vietnam. The border is 2,161 km (1,343 mi) in length and runs from the tripoint with China in the north to tripoint with Cambodia in the south.

== Description ==
The border starts in the north at the tripoint with China and proceeds overland in a south-eastwards direction. It then turns to the west, briefly utilising the Nam Sam River, before turning sharply south-eastwards and following the Annamite Mountains and, for a period, the Sepon River, terminating at the Cambodian tripoint.

== History ==
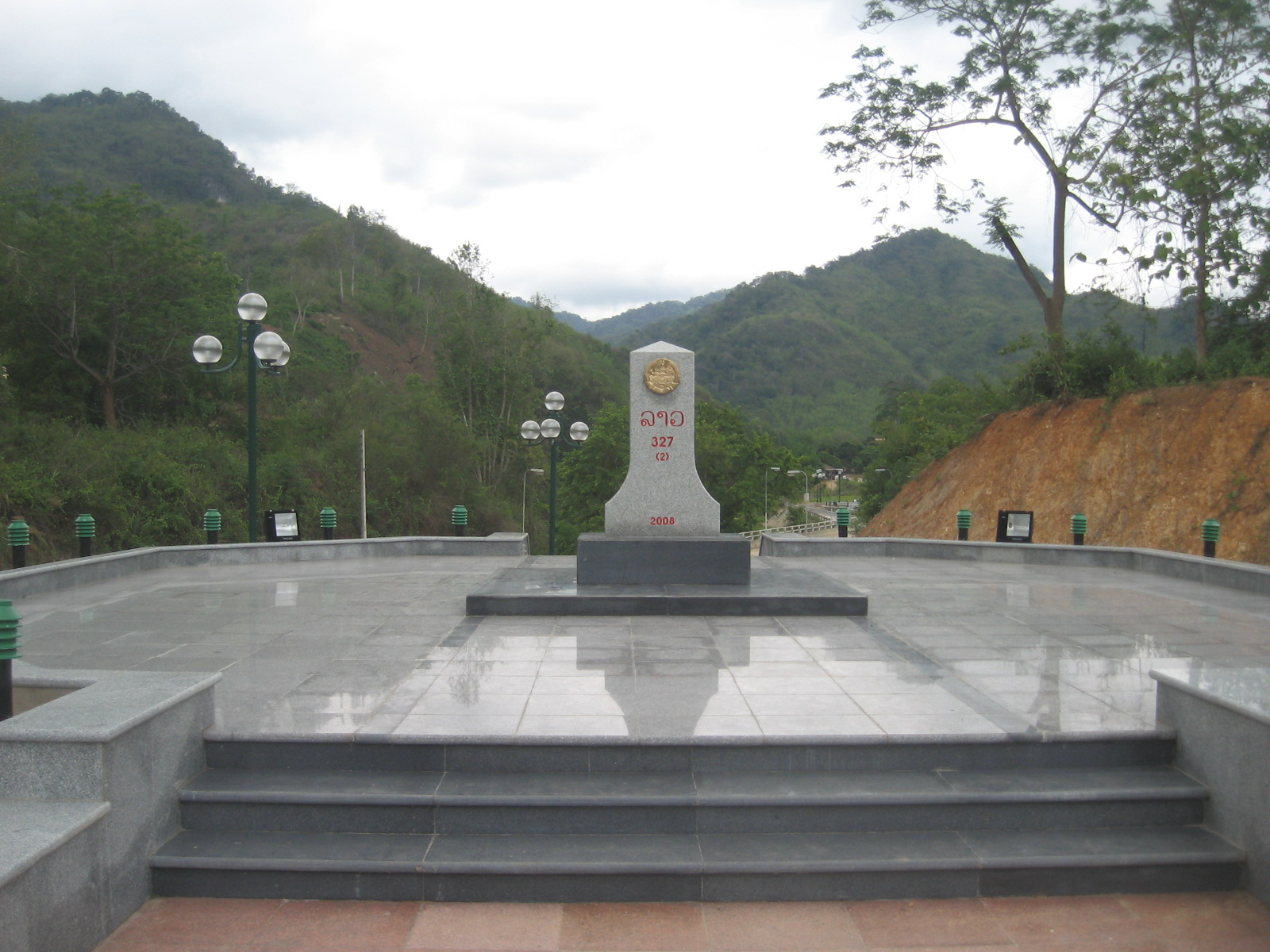
A border marker at Nậm Xôi

Historically the Annamite Range formed a natural boundary between Vietnamese kingdoms in the east and Lao, Thai and Khmer kingdoms in the west. From the 1860s France began establishing a presence in the region such as French Cochinchina and the Kingdom of Cambodia, modern-day Cambodia and Vietnam, and the colony of French Indochina was created in 1887. Laos was at this point part of the Kingdom of Siam (the old name for Thailand), however it was annexed to French Indochina in 1893 following the Franco-Siamese crisis. The precise date of the delimitation of the frontier is unclear; the International Boundary Study states that "The juridical basis of the Laos–Viet-Nam boundary probably stems from ancient treaties and custom as modified or made more specific by decrees of the Indochinese administration." Part of the border was demarcated in 1916 following a dispute, and French maps were drawn up during the colonial period that were used as the basis for the later international border.

Laos obtained a partial independence from France in 1949, with Cambodia gaining complete independence in 1953, followed by Vietnam in 1954. Vietnam was however partitioned into North and South Vietnam separated by a Vietnamese Demilitarized Zone, with Laos bordering both entities. The Kampuchean People's Revolutionary Party (KPRP) was founded on 28 June 1951 before it came to power in January 1979. During the Vietnam War the border was crossed by Ho Chi Minh's Viet Cong supply lines along with the communist movements such as Pathet Lao led by Souphanouvong and Kaysone Phomvihane, the Khmer Rouge led by Angkar ("Organization") and Saloth Sâr ("Pol Pot"), most notably the Ho Chi Minh Trail, causing it to be heavily bombed by American forces. Following the victory of the Communists in 1975 in Vietnam, Cambodia and Laos, a border treaty was signed in 1976 based on the colonial-era border line, which was formed as "Communist Indochina" or "Indochinese Federation" after the fall of Phnom Penh, Saigon and Vientiane as the war had ended, with a new communist government organizations coming to power such as the Communist Party of Vietnam (CPV), the Communist Party of Kampuchea (CPK) and Lao People's Revolutionary Party (LPRP) as a new system for the new society as a whole, which then formed with the constitutions as it was renamed the Socialist Republic of Vietnam, Democratic Kampuchea and Lao People's Democratic Republic both declared by the party. But for Cambodia after it was declared Year Zero, Pol Pot's reign of terror became responsible for the deaths of 1.5 up to nearly 2 million people, about a quarter of the whole population before it was ousted by Vietnam during the Cambodian–Vietnamese War to end the infamous genocide that almost eradicating everything by the cruelest and vicious Khmer Rouge cadres which then forced to flee back into the jungle near the Thai border after taking the capital Phnom Penh by the Vietnamese Army on 7 January 1979 led by its leader Lê Duẩn. On the ground demarcation then took place from 1979 to 1984. Some small modification of the border were made in 1986.

== Border crossings ==
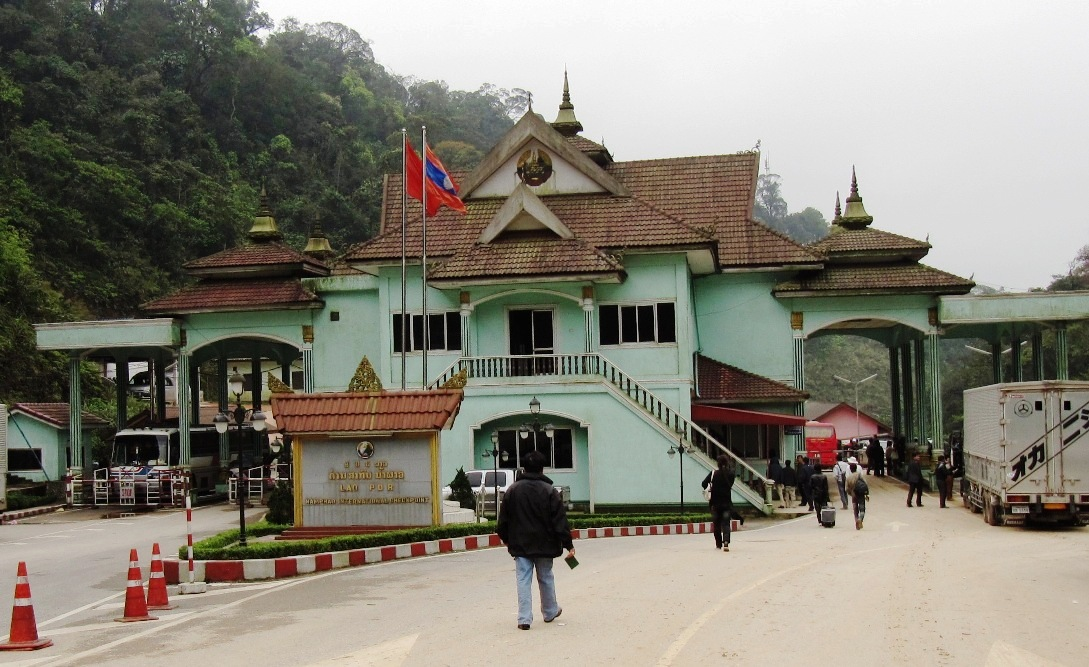
A border crossing at Nam Phao

There are several border crossings:

- Sop Hun (May, Phongsaly, Laos) – Tây Trang (Điện Biên district, Điện Biên province, Vietnam)
- Namsoi (Viengxay, Houaphanh, Laos) – Na Mèo (Quan Sơn, Thanh Hóa, Vietnam)
- Thalao – Bát Mọt, Thanh Hóa province
- Namkan (Nong Het, Xiangkhouang, Laos) – Nậm Cắn (Kỳ Sơn, Nghệ An, Vietnam)
- Thongmisy – Tam Hợp, Nghệ An province
- Namon – Thanh Thuỷ, Nghệ An province
- Namphao (Khamkeut, Bolikhamsai, Laos) – Cầu Treo (Hương Sơn, Hà Tĩnh, Vietnam)
- Naphao (Boualapha, Khammouane, Laos) – Cha Lo (Minh Hóa, Quảng Bình, Vietnam)
- Dansavan (Seponh, Savannakhet, Laos) – Lao Bảo (Hướng Hóa, Quảng Trị, Vietnam)
- Phoukeua (Phouvong, Attapeu, Laos) – Bờ Y (Ngọc Hồi, Kon Tum, Vietnam)

== See also ==
- Laos–Vietnam relations
