= Pakkading district =

Coordinates: 18.3301°N 103.9840°E

Pakkading district ເມືອງປາກກະດິງ
- District
- Location of Pakkading district in Laos
- Country: Laos
- Province: Bolikhamsai
- Time zone: UTC+7 (ICT)

Pakkading (ປາກກະດິງ [pȁːk kā.dìŋ], literally 'mouth of the (river)', is a district (muang) of Bolikhamsai province in central Laos. It is home to the 1,690 km^{2} Nam Kading National Biodiversity Conservation Area (NBCA).
