= Deforestation in Laos =

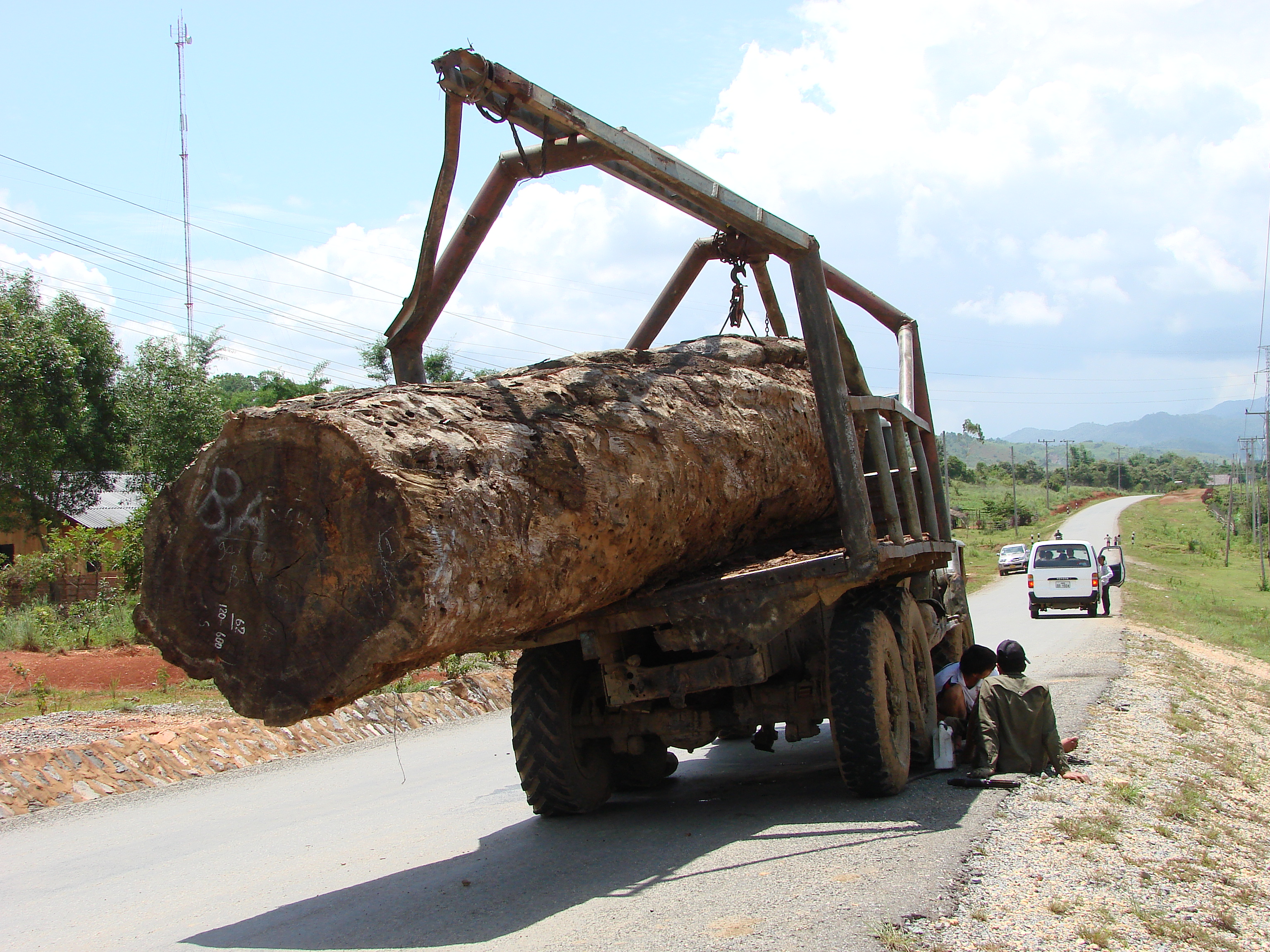
A logging truck on the Bolaven Plateau, southern Laos, 2009.

Deforestation in Laos is a major environmental concern, with Laos losing forest area to legal and illegal logging.

== Illegal logging ==
In 2020, more than 2,600 cubic metres of illegally harvested wood and over 290 tonnes of illicit timber were seized. Authorities inspected wood processing plants and found 2,788 were in violation of governmental restrictions. Some 1,636 plants which failed to operate lawfully were shut down.

== Commercial interest in the forest ==
Timber products targeted for logging in Laos includes ironwood, mahogany, pine, redwood, and teak—and other forestry products—benzoin (resin), charcoal, and sticklac.

The forest has also been an important source of wild foods, herbal medicines, and timber for house construction and even into the 1990s continues to be a valued reserve of natural products for noncommercial household consumption. Since the mid-1980s widespread commercial harvesting of timber for the export market has disrupted the traditional gathering of forest products in a number of locations and contributed to extremely rapid deforestation throughout the country.

=== Agriculture ===
Slash-and-burn agriculture was practiced by approximately one million farmers in 1990. Slash-and-burn agriculture is highly destructive to the forest environment, because it entails shifting from old to new plots of land to allow exhausted soil to rejuvenate, a process that is estimated to require at least four to six years.

Government efforts to preserve valuable hardwoods for commercial extraction have led to measures to prohibit slash-and-burn agriculture throughout the country. Government restrictions on clearing forests for slash-and-burn cropping in the late 1980s, along with attempts to gradually resettle upland slash-and-burn farming villages to lowland locations suitable for paddy rice cultivation had significant effects on upland villages.

== History ==
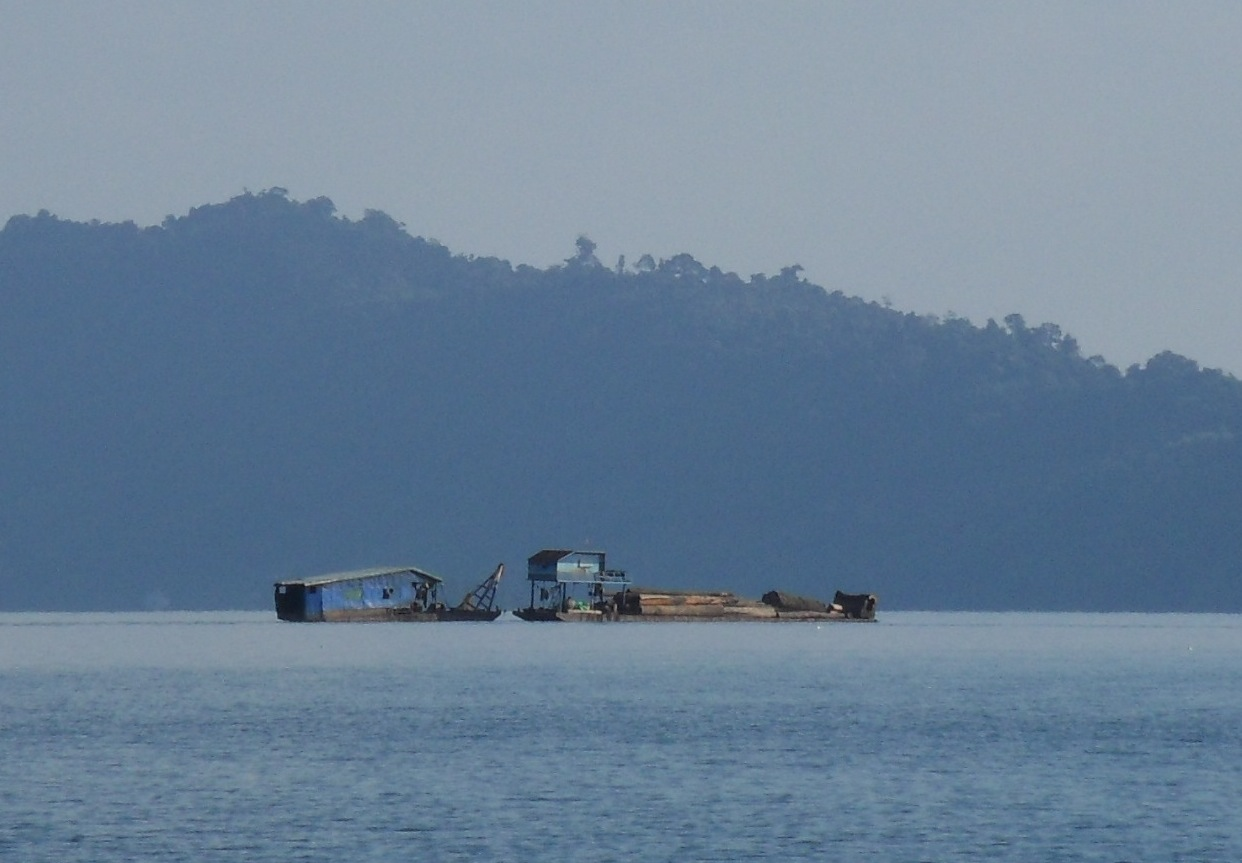
A boat carrying logs on Nam Ngum lake, 2011

Timber resources have been commercially exploited on a small scale since the colonial period and are an important source of foreign exchange. In 1988 wood products accounted for more than one-half of all export earnings. In 1992 timber and wood products were almost one-third of the total principal exports.

In the 1950s, forests covered 70 percent of the land area in Laos. By 1992, according to government estimates, forest coverage had decreased by nearly one-third, to just 47 percent of total land area. As of 2021, governmental policy is to restore forest cover to 70 percent of the nation's landmass.

Deforestation increased steadily throughout the 1980s, at an annual average rate of about 1.2 percent in the first half of the decade according to the United Nations (UN) and other monitoring agencies. This rate represents the destruction of about 150,000 to 160,000 hectares annually, as compared with annual reforestation of about 2,000 hectares. The government, however, reported a deforestation rate double this figure. Deforestation results from clearing forestland for shifting cultivation, removing logs for industrial uses and fuel, and the export of exotic hardwoods.

The volume of logs (roundwood) removed for industrial purposes increased by about 70 percent between 1975–1977 and 1985–1987, to about 330,000 m^{3}. However, this volume was dwarfed by that removed for domestic (fuel) purposes. Between 1980 and 1989, the volume of logs removed for fuel increased by about 25 percent, to about 3.7 million m^{3}; only about 100,000 m^{3} were removed for industrial purposes. By 1991 these figures had increased to approximately 3.9 million m^{3} and 106,000 m^{3}, respectively.

Following the introduction of the New Economic Mechanism, decentralization of forest management to autonomous forest enterprises at the provincial level encouraged increased exploitation of forests. At the central and provincial levels, autonomous forest enterprises are responsible for forest management.

=== Legislation ===
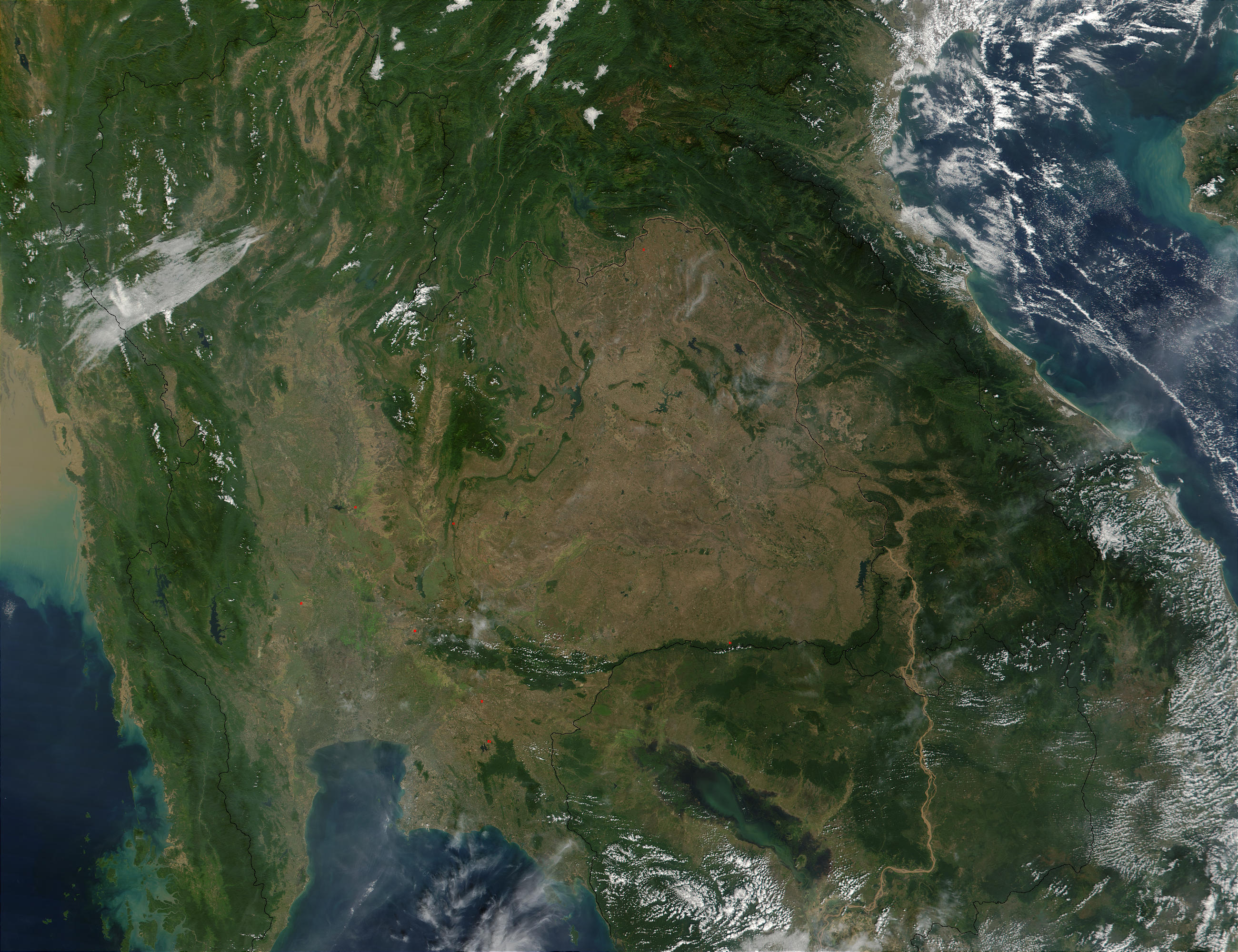
This is a 2001 MODIS image of southeastern Asia. In eastern Thailand, the deforested brown area that dominates the center of the image outlines the country's border with Laos and Cambodia and is evidence of ongoing deforestation. Deforestation is a major contributor to regional flooding.

The government moved to reconcile its opposing objectives of decentralized forestry management and environmental protection.

Toward the end of 1989, logging was again permitted, but only based on quotas extended to individual forestry enterprises. In response to the restrictions, production of unprocessed logs, both roundwood or timber decreased slightly in 1989. However, according to the Asian Development Bank, production more than recovered the following year.

The effect of the restrictions is most clearly shown in the export statistics for 1989—exports of timber and wood products had decreased by 30 percent from the previous year. In 1991 a new decree banned all logging until further notice, in hopes of controlling widespread illegal logging and subsequent environmental destruction. However, there was little practical impact, and illegal logging remains widespread. The smuggling of logs to Thailand also is significant.

Prime Minister Thongloun Sisoulith on 13 May 2016 issued Prime Minister's Order No. 15 which banned the export of unfinished wood products including timber and logs.

=== Illicit military involvement ===
The area of the Luang Prabang Range, at the border between Laos and Thailand, is allegedly rife with military involvement in the timber trade.

== Tree cover extent and loss ==
Global Forest Watch publishes annual estimates of tree cover loss and 2000 tree cover extent derived from time-series analysis of Landsat satellite imagery in the Global Forest Change dataset. In this framework, tree cover refers to vegetation taller than 5 m (including natural forests and tree plantations), and tree cover loss is defined as the complete removal of tree cover canopy for a given year, regardless of cause.

For Laos, the dashboard reports that from 2001 to 2024 the country lost about 5,163,120 ha (51,631.2 km^{2}) of tree cover (about 27% of its 2000 tree cover area). For tree cover density greater than 30%, country statistics report a 2000 tree cover extent of 19,118,849 ha (191,188.49 km^{2}). The charts and table below display this data. In simple terms, the annual loss number is the area where tree cover disappeared in that year, and the extent number shows what remains of the 2000 tree cover baseline after subtracting cumulative loss. Forest regrowth is not included in the dataset.

Annual tree cover loss in Laos, 2001–2024. View chart definition.
Tree cover extent in 2000 minus cumulative tree cover loss in Laos, 2001–2024 (loss-only residual; does not account for gain). View chart definition.

Annual tree cover extent and loss
Year	Tree cover extent (km2) (Note: This residual measure does not include forest regrowth.)	Annual tree cover loss (km2)
2001	190,823.89	364.60
2002	190,265.03	558.86
2003	189,394.30	870.73
2004	188,751.90	642.40
2005	188,068.71	683.19
2006	186,842.32	1,226.39
2007	185,512.57	1,329.75
2008	184,706.74	805.83
2009	183,251.16	1,455.58
2010	181,580.17	1,670.99
2011	180,271.15	1,309.02
2012	178,795.83	1,475.32
2013	176,739.80	2,056.03
2014	174,301.54	2,438.26
2015	171,452.19	2,849.35
2016	167,575.84	3,876.35
2017	164,085.40	3,490.44
2018	161,138.82	2,946.58
2019	157,491.86	3,646.96
2020	153,916.66	3,575.20
2021	150,741.04	3,175.62
2022	147,524.16	3,216.88
2023	143,069.55	4,454.61
2024	139,557.29	3,512.26

== REDD+ reference levels and forest monitoring ==
Laos has submitted a national forest reference emission level/forest reference level (FREL/FRL) under the UNFCCC REDD+ framework, which is used as a benchmark in the context of results-based payments and is subject to UNFCCC technical assessment. For the historical reference period 2005–2014, the UNFCCC technical assessment reported assessed annual average values of 41,013,316 t CO2 eq/year (emissions) and −7,533,558 t CO2 eq/year (removals), treated as two independent values (emissions and removals reported separately).

The assessed benchmark is national in scope and covers the REDD+ activities “reducing emissions from deforestation”, “reducing emissions from forest degradation”, and “enhancement of forest carbon stocks”, with no adjustment for national circumstances. The technical assessment reported that activity data were derived from national “forest type maps” for 2005, 2010 and 2015, and that emission/removal factors were derived primarily from the country’s second national forest inventory (2015–2017), using methodologies consistent with the 2006 IPCC Guidelines. In terms of scope, the submission included carbon pools for above-ground and below-ground biomass and reported CO2 only, excluding deadwood, litter, soil organic carbon, and non-CO2 gases; the technical assessment reported overall uncertainty of 16.0% for historical emissions and 19.3% for historical removals (2005–2014).

For MRV and ongoing reporting, Lao PDR has reported elements of a national forest monitoring system (NFMS) on the UNFCCC REDD+ Web Platform, including a National Forest Monitoring System “Road map” (October 2020) that describes a phased approach combining forest cover-change monitoring, the production of activity data and emission factors, and supporting information-technology systems (including a web portal and database) to enable REDD+ reporting and results submissions.
