= Borikham =

- Town
- Location in Laos
- Coordinates: 18°33′41″N 103°43′25″E
- Country: Laos
- Province: Bolikhamsai Province
- District: Borikhane District
- Time zone: UTC+7 (ICT)

Borikham (also Muang Borikham, Borikhane, Bolikham, Bolikhan or Muang Borikan) is a river town in Bolikhamsai Province, in western Laos. It is the capital of Borikhane District, to the north by road from Na Khaulom.

Borikham lies on the Nam Xan River, spanned by a Bailey bridge. The Lao Army had an important base at Borikham.
