= Nam Xan River =

River in Laos

The Nam Xan River (French: Nam Sane) is a major river of west-central Laos. It flows from the mountains of central Laos through Borikham and joins the Mekong River at 18°22′36″N 103°39′29″E at Pakxan.
