= Khamkeut district =

Coordinates: 18°10′45″N 104°56′39″E

Khamkeut district ເມືອງຄຳເກີດ
- District
- Location of Khamkeut district in Laos

- Location within Laos
- Country: Laos
- Province: Bolikhamsai

Government
  - Type: City Authority
  - Head of City: Mr Bouneseume Paveekham (2012- )

Population
  - Total: 63,268
- Time zone: UTC+7 (ICT)
- Area code: 054

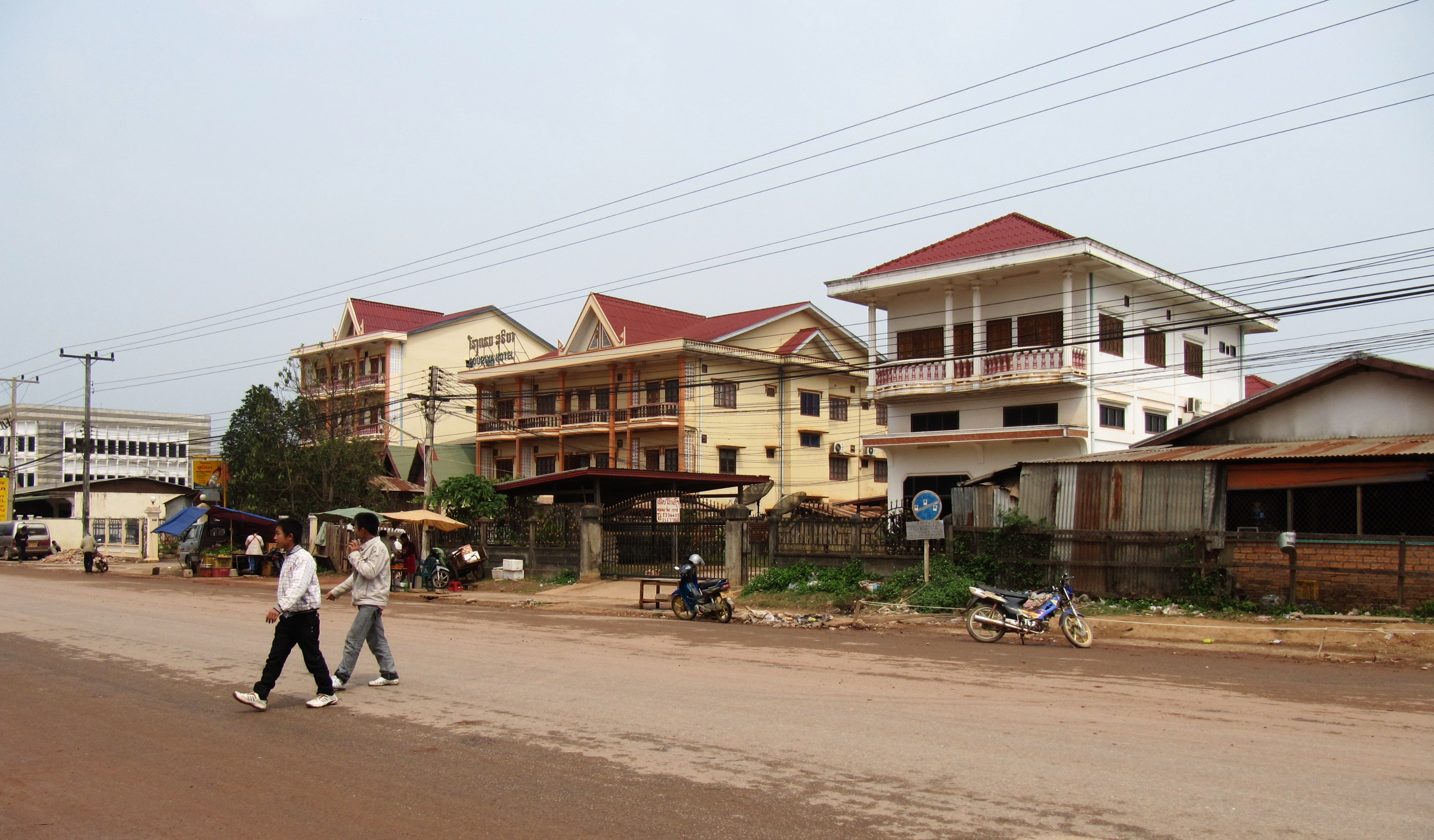
Main street, Lak Sao, Khamkeut district

Khamkeut is a district (muang) of Bolikhamsai province in central Laos.

Khamkeut district was extensively bombed during the Vietnam War in the 1960s and 1970s. As of 2018, Khamkeut District continued to experience deaths from previously unexploded ordnance.

== Settlements ==
Laotian settlements prefixed by the word Ban are usually small villages. Their names may appear with or without the prefix.

- Ban Bo
- Ban Bong
- Ban Boung
- Ban Chakou
- Ban Chalet
- Ban Dongbang
- Ban Donxat
- Ban Fan
- Ban Gnotkep
- Ban Heuana
- Ban Hinlon
- Ban Hinpen
- Ban Houana
- Ban Houayka
- Ban Houaykeo
- Ban Houay Khang
- Ban Houay-O
- Ban Kaan
- Ban Kagna
- Ban Ka Long
- Ban Kang
- Ban Kang-Na
- Ban Kapap
- Ban Katok
- Ban Kem Duoc
- Ban Kengbay
- Ban Kengbit
- Ban Kenghua
- Ban Kengkang
- Ban Kengkouang
- Ban Kenglat
- Ban Keng Mo Mi
- Ban Keng Mot
- Ban Kengxoun
- Ban Keokhanxang
- Ban Khammouan
- Ban Kham Mouang
- Ban Khanglek
- Ban Khonken
- Ban Khouapen
- Ban Khouasoung
- Ban Kokfuang
- Ban Kouanchan
- Ban Lak Sao (Ban Lakxao)
- Ban Latmouang
- Ban Muangcham
- Ban Muang Noy
- Ban Nachalai
- Ban Nacheng
- Ban Nachia
- Ban Nadi
- Ban Nadua
- Ban Nafuang
- Ban Nahai
- Ban Nahat
- Ban Nahin-Nai (1)
- Ban Nahin-Nai (2)
- Ban Nahoua
- Ban Nahuang
- Ban Nakadok
- Ban Nakang
- Ban Nakham
- Ban Nakham (3)
- Ban Nakhouan
- Ban Nalia
- Ban Naliang
- Ban Nam Doy
- Ban Namkang
- Ban Namkat
- Ban Namkou
- Ban Namngoy
- Ban Nam On
- Ban Nam Oulon
- Ban Nampan
- Ban Namphao
- Ban Nampong
- Ban Namsaleo
- Ban Namsanam
- Ban Namthi
- Ban Namtong
- Ban Namuang
- Ban Namxao
- Ban Nanang
- Ban Na Nano
- Ban Nanoy
- Ban Napakvan
- Ban Nape [18°18'0"N 105°5'0"E]
- Ban Naphong
- Ban Napoung
- Ban Nasalom
- Ban Nasao
- Ban Na Ta
- Ban Nathomkouang
- Ban Nathon
- Ban Nava
- Ban Naxouang
- Ban Noc
- Ban Nong
- Ban Nonggnao
- Ban Nonghin
- Ban Nonghong
- Ban Nongkok
- Ban Nong Leung
- Ban Nonglouang
- Ban Nong O
- Ban Nongsang
- Ban Nongxong
- Ban On
- Ban Ongtu
- Ban Pahok
- Ban Pakatan
- Ban Pakha
- Ban Pbonkeo
- Ban Phabang
- Ban Phakhoun
- Ban Phamuang
- Ban Phayat
- Ban Phiangdon
- Ban Phila
- Ban Phon
- Ban Phon Bok
- Ban Phonbong
- Ban Phonhong
- Ban Phonkham
- Ban Phonlom
- Ban Phonmuang
- Ban Phonngam [18°9'57"N 104°32'23"E]
- Ban Phonngam [18°5'57"N 104°50'28"E]
- Ban Phonpheng
- Ban Phonsa-At
- Ban Phonsavang
- Ban Phonsoung
- Ban Phontan
- Ban Phonxai
- Ban Pompek
- Ban Poung
- Ban Poungkoak
- Ban Pounglan
- Ban Sam
- Ban Sam Hing
- Ban San
- Ban Sang
- Ban Senkhoun
- Ban Sensi
- Ban Sithon
- Ban Sopchat
- Ban Sophoy
- Ban Sopkan
- Ban Sopkat
- Ban Sopkhom
- Ban Sopkhon
- Ban Sopphak
- Ban Soppon
- Ban Soppong [18°22'0"N 104°55'0"E]
- Ban Soppong [18°2'0"N 104°58'0"E]
- Ban Sopsang
- Ban Soptong
- Ban Tha
- Ban Thabak (Tha-Bak)
- Ban Thamtem
- Ban Thaothiam
- Ban Thasala
- Ban Thasom
- Ban Thaveng
- Ban Thaxang
- Ban Thong
- Ban Thonggnai
- Ban Thongkhe
- Ban Tongli
- Ban Tongxoua
- Ban Tonsan
- Ban Tonxan
- Ban Vanggneng
- Ban Vangkeo
- Ban Vangkhang
- Ban Vangkhi
- Ban Vangphala
- Ban Vangxao
- Ban Vangxouay
- Ban Xambon
- Ban Xamhing-Nua
- Ban Xamhing-Tai
- Ban Xamteuy-Nua
- Ban Xamteuy-Tai
- Ban Xot
- Ban Xu Koum
- Keng Deng
- Muang Khamkeut
- Nape (Na Pe) [18°18'0"N 105°6'0"E]
- Phakhao

== Climate ==
Climate data for Na Pe, elevation 588 m (1,929 ft), (1961–1990)
Month	Jan	Feb	Mar	Apr	May	Jun	Jul	Aug	Sep	Oct	Nov	Dec	Year
Mean daily maximum °C (°F)	23.2 (73.8)	24.3 (75.7)	29.3 (84.7)	30.0 (86.0)	30.5 (86.9)	28.8 (83.8)	27.7 (81.9)	28.2 (82.8)	28.2 (82.8)	27.2 (81.0)	24.3 (75.7)	22.7 (72.9)	27.0 (80.7)
Daily mean °C (°F)	17.2 (63.0)	18.8 (65.8)	22.5 (72.5)	24.3 (75.7)	25.5 (77.9)	25.2 (77.4)	24.7 (76.5)	24.7 (76.5)	24.2 (75.6)	22.2 (72.0)	20.2 (68.4)	17.7 (63.9)	22.3 (72.1)
Mean daily minimum °C (°F)	11.1 (52.0)	13.3 (55.9)	15.6 (60.1)	18.8 (65.8)	20.5 (68.9)	21.7 (71.1)	21.7 (71.1)	21.1 (70.0)	20.0 (68.0)	17.2 (63.0)	16.1 (61.0)	12.8 (55.0)	17.5 (63.5)
Average precipitation mm (inches)	5.0 (0.20)	33.0 (1.30)	48.0 (1.89)	107.0 (4.21)	175.0 (6.89)	295.0 (11.61)	429.0 (16.89)	422.0 (16.61)	292.0 (11.50)	112.0 (4.41)	15.0 (0.59)	10.0 (0.39)	1,943 (76.49)
Source: FAO
