= Borikhane district =

Coordinates: 18°33′45″N 103°43′17″E

Borikhane district ເມືອງບໍລິຄັນ
- District
- Location of Borikhane district in Laos
- Country: Laos
- Province: Bolikhamsai
- Seat: Borikham
- Time zone: UTC+7 (ICT)

Borikhane (Bolikanh) is a district (muang) of Bolikhamsai province in central Laos. Its administrative center is Borikham town.
