= Pakxan =

Pakxan ປາກຊັນ
- District & municipality
- Pakxan District
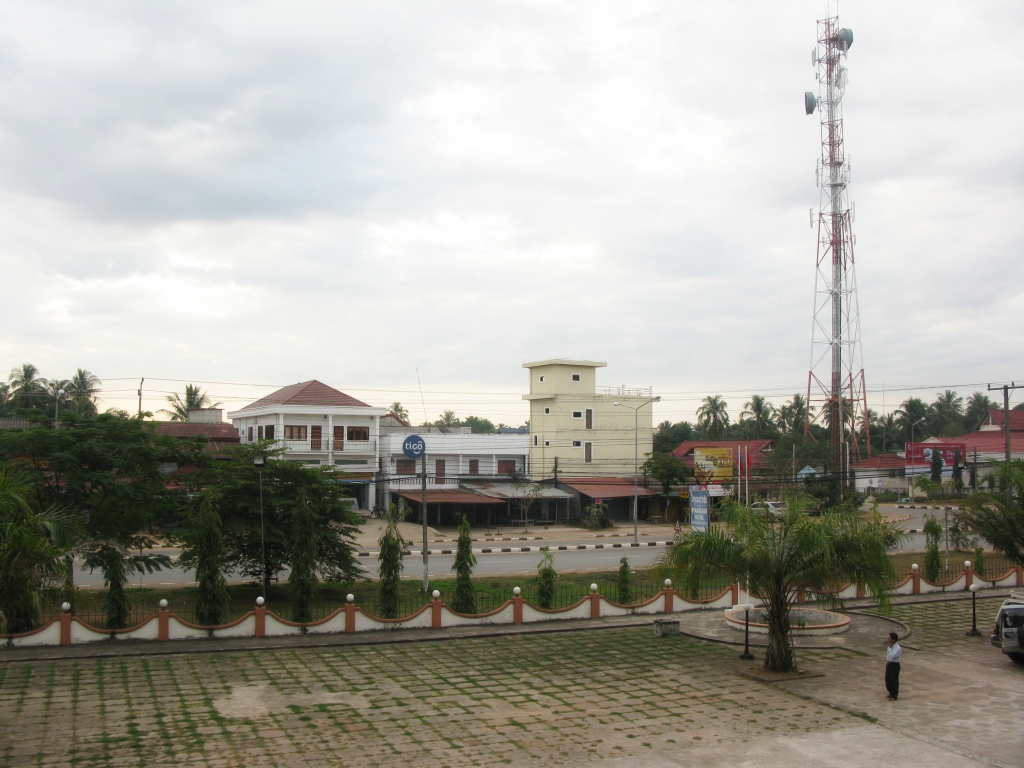

- Location of Pakxan district in Laos
- Coordinates: 18°23′47″N 103°39′21″E
- Country: Laos
- Province: Bolikhamsai Province
- District: Pakxan District
- Elevation: 153 m (502 ft)

Population (2015)
  - Total: 45,000
- Time zone: UTC+7 (ICT)

Pakxan (/pɑːkˈsɑːn/; Lao: ປາກຊັນ, pronounced [pȁːk̚sán]) is a district and town in Bolikhamsai Province, Laos.

== History ==
Pakxan was founded in the 19th century. The Pakxan region had experienced insecurity since the invasion by Annam in 1834, followed by invasions by the Siamese, and Siamese sovereignty over Laos in 1836, and especially after 1865 with the invasions of Haws or "red flags", gangs from southern China. These invasions began to reduce the populations of Xieng Khouang and Bolikhamsai, and it was the Siamese who completed the depopulation by deporting most of the Phou Eun inhabiting the region.

In 1876, Rama V, King of Siam, ordered the creation of Bolikhamsai with the last survivors of the Haw invasion of 1874. Bolikhamsai was placed under the authority of Kha Luang Nong Khai. From 1885, the French, who took over neighboring Vietnam, challenged Siamese sovereignty over Laos. After Auguste Pavie's mission dating the Mekong to Luang Prabang, the Siamese were forced to leave the left bank of the Mekong and evacuate the position they had created at the mouth of the Nam Xan River. At that time, Patchoum Muong (or Paxum) was the largest town near the confluence of the Nam Xan, and it is on the Nam Xan, a half-day by boat up the Mekong.

In the course of the 1890s, missionaries of the Missions étrangères de Paris, attached to the mission of Christianity to a Bangkok-based Keng-Sadok, on the Mekong River, miles from the mouth of the Nam Xan. Then the missionaries occupied Pakxan, abandoned by the Siamese, and there built a church.

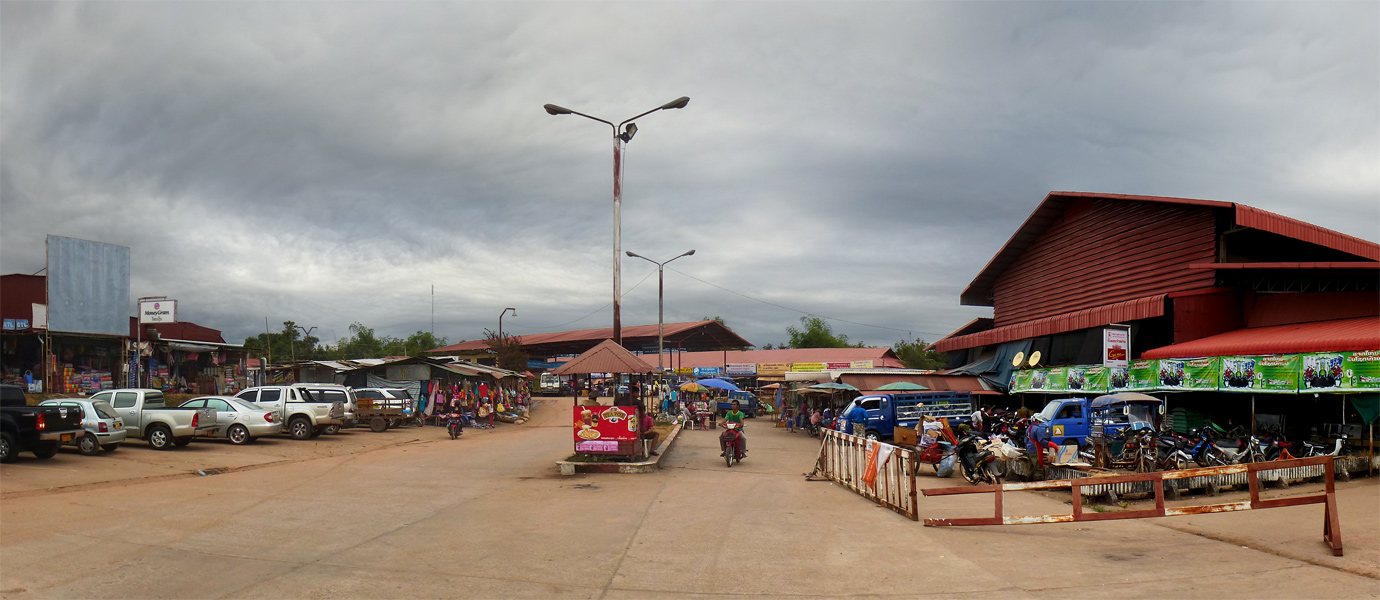
The market in Pakxan

== Climate ==
Climate data for Pakxan (1990–2019)
Month	Jan	Feb	Mar	Apr	May	Jun	Jul	Aug	Sep	Oct	Nov	Dec	Year
Mean daily maximum °C (°F)	29.0 (84.2)	30.8 (87.4)	32.6 (90.7)	33.9 (93.0)	32.9 (91.2)	32.1 (89.8)	31.5 (88.7)	31.5 (88.7)	31.8 (89.2)	31.8 (89.2)	30.6 (87.1)	28.7 (83.7)	31.4 (88.6)
Daily mean °C (°F)	22.6 (72.7)	24.5 (76.1)	26.9 (80.4)	28.7 (83.7)	28.6 (83.5)	28.4 (83.1)	28.0 (82.4)	28.0 (82.4)	27.9 (82.2)	27.2 (81.0)	25.3 (77.5)	22.9 (73.2)	26.6 (79.9)
Mean daily minimum °C (°F)	16.2 (61.2)	18.2 (64.8)	21.1 (70.0)	23.4 (74.1)	24.3 (75.7)	24.6 (76.3)	24.4 (75.9)	24.4 (75.9)	23.9 (75.0)	22.6 (72.7)	20.0 (68.0)	17.0 (62.6)	21.7 (71.0)
Average precipitation mm (inches)	10 (0.4)	28 (1.1)	53 (2.1)	124 (4.9)	401 (15.8)	690 (27.2)	796 (31.3)	640 (25.2)	431 (17.0)	113 (4.4)	17 (0.7)	5 (0.2)	3,308 (130.3)
Average relative humidity (%)	67.9	63.4	66.1	67.0	72.7	76.6	80.7	81.4	78.1	72.7	68.3	64.7	71.6
Mean monthly sunshine hours	221.6	192.7	240.4	205.9	157.3	96.7	78.5	84.2	141.3	202.5	231.2	218.5	2,070.8
Source 1: Food and Agriculture Organization of the United Nations
Source 2: Bureau of Meteorology (sun 1938–1944) SeaDelt (humidity 2016–2022)
