= Bolikhamsai province =

Province of Laos

Bolikhamsai province ແຂວງ ບໍລິຄໍາໄຊ
- Province
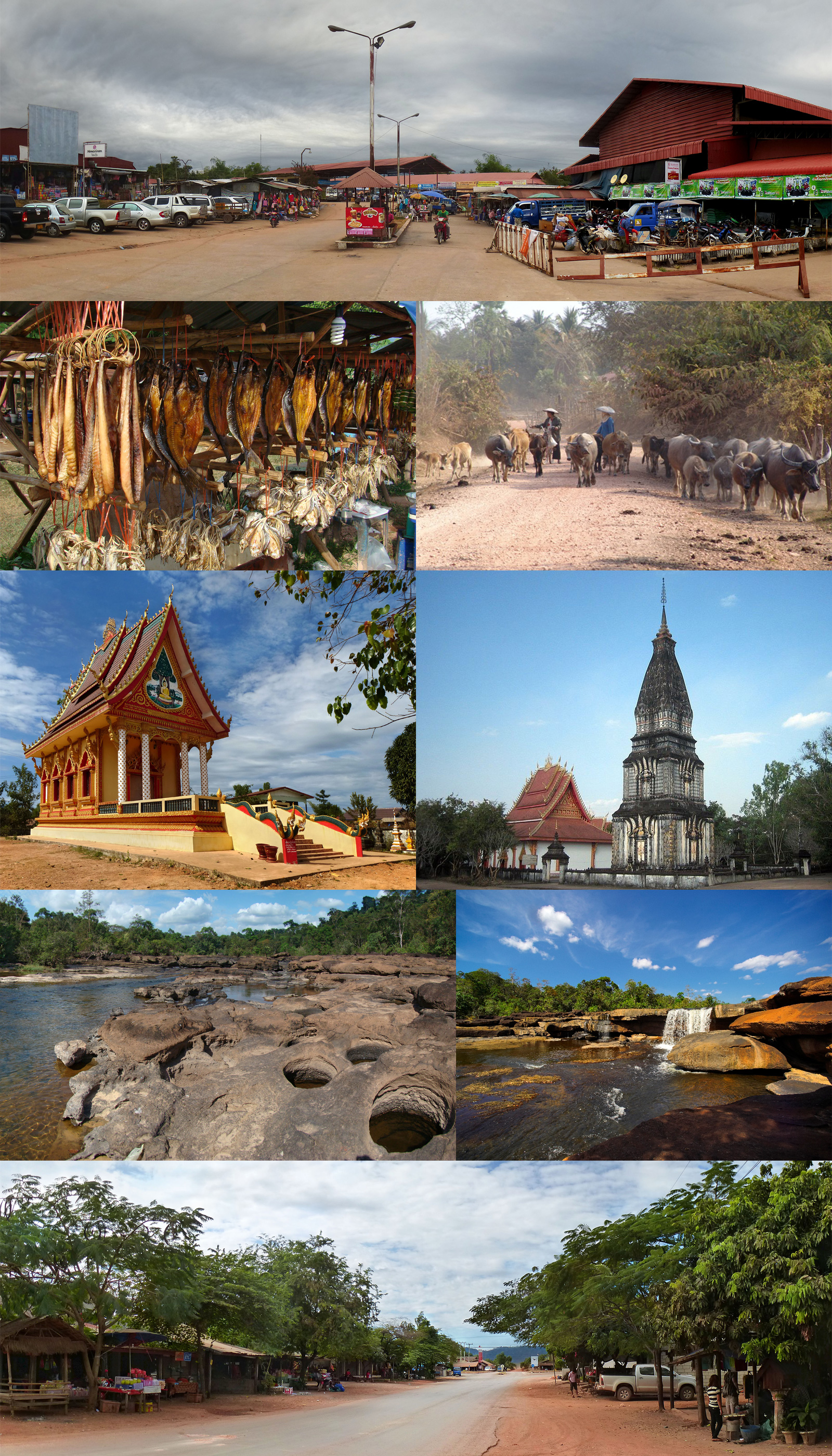

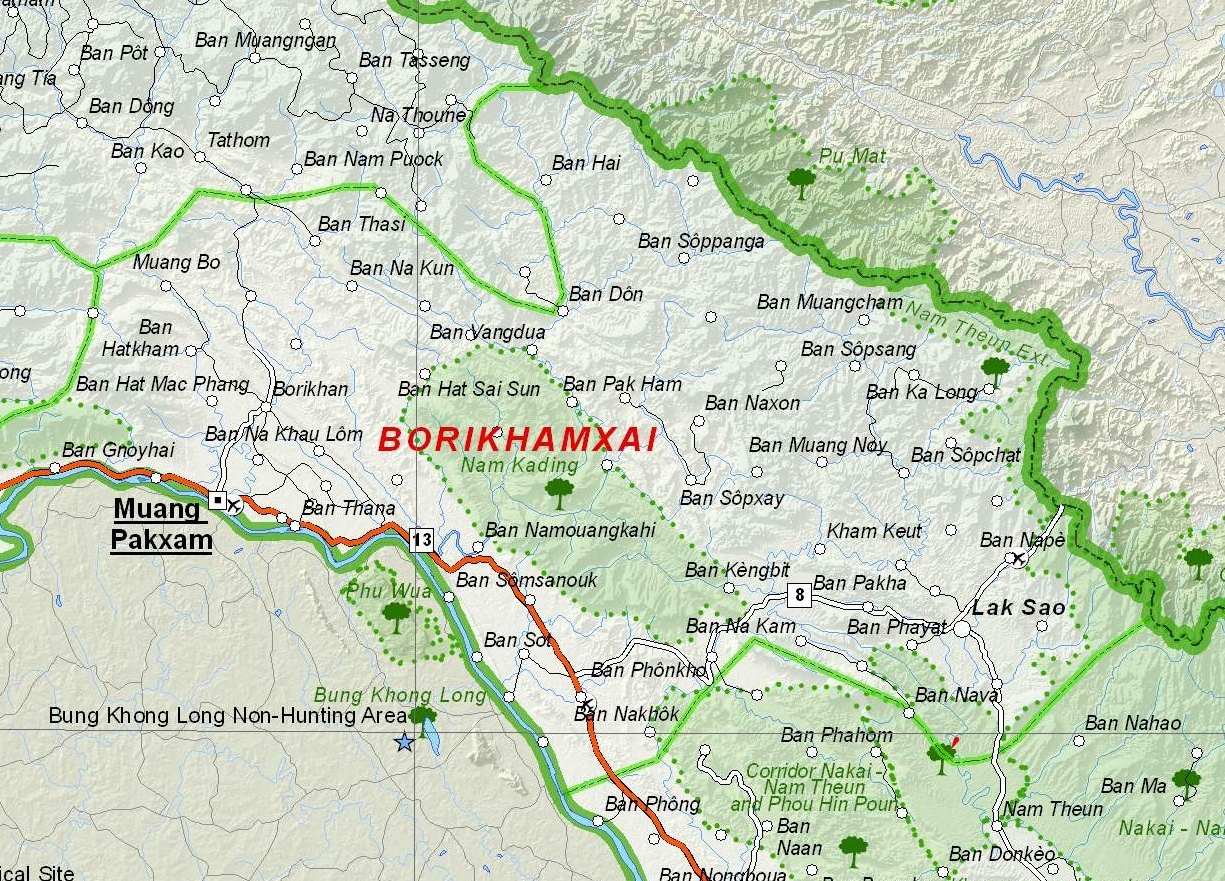
- Map of Bolikhamsai province

- Location of Bolikhamsai province in Laos
- Coordinates: 18.383333°N 103.65°E
- Country: Laos
- Capital: Paksan

Area
  - Total: 14,863 km^{2} (5,739 sq mi)

Population (2020 census)
  - Total: 315,956
  - Density: 21.258/km^{2} (55.058/sq mi)
- Time zone: UTC+7 (ICT)
- ISO 3166 code: LA-BL
- HDI (2022): ▲0.657 medium · 3rd

Bolikhamsai (Lao: ບໍລິຄໍາໄຊ, pronounced [bɔ̀ːlīʔ kʰámsáj]), formerly gallicized as Borikhamxay, is a province of Laos. Pakxan, Thaphabat, Pakkading, Borikhane, Viengthong, and Khamkeut are its districts and Pakxan is its capital city. The province is the site of the Nam Theun 2 Dam, the country's largest hydroelectric project. It covers an area of 14,863 square kilometres (5,739 sq mi).

== History ==
The province faced invasions from the Siamese throughout its history. The foundation of Paksan dates from the late nineteenth century. In 1836, the Siamese assumed suzerainty over Laos. The province was formed in 1986 from parts of the Vientiane province and Khammuan. In February 2005, 100 villagers were forced to sell their possessions and prepare to be evicted in Kok Poh village in Borikham, and the central authorities intervened to stop this.

== Geography ==
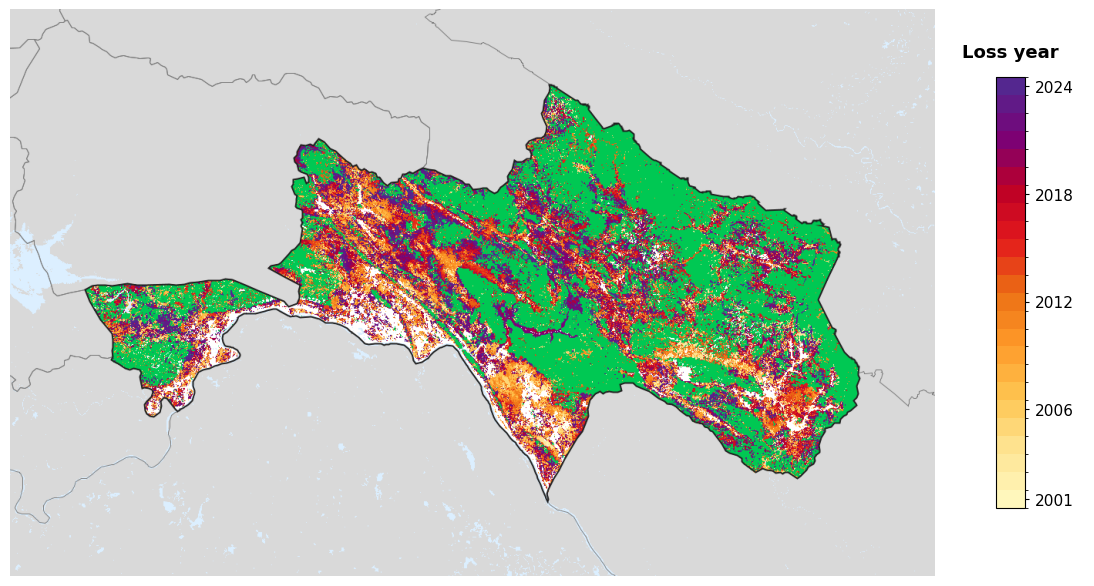
Tree-cover loss year in Bolikhamsai, 2001-2024, from the Global Forest Change dataset.

Bolikhamsai province covers an area of 14,863 square kilometres (5,739 sq mi). It borders Xiangkhouang province to the northwest, Vietnam to the east, Khammouane province to the south, and Thailand to the west. Settlements include Pakxan, Borikham, Lak Sao, Muang Bo, Ban Hatkham, Ban Thana, Ban Thasi, Ban Hai, Ban Don, Ban Soppanga, Ban Pak Ham, Ban Naxon, Ban Kengbit, Ban Pakha, Ban Phayat, Ban Sopchat, Ban Muangcham and Ban Nap. The province includes the Annamite Range, stretching east to Vietnam, while to the west are the Mekong River and Thailand.

Bolikhamsai province has a rugged terrain, with boulders and streams. Its elevation ranges from 140–1,588 metres (459–5,210 ft). The principal river is the Nam Kading, meaning 'water like a bell', a tributary of the Mekong; its catchment covers about 92% of the provincial area. Other rivers are the Nam Muan, Nam Sat, and the Nam Tek. Waterfalls include the Tad Leuk, Tad Xay and Tad Xang. The longest mountain range in the province is the Phou Louang range, running to the southwest, the Phou Ao range to the southeast; the Thalabat range to the northwest, and the Pa Guang range to the northeast. In Khamkheuth District, there is karst limestone scenery, which is allegedly the largest formation of its type in Southeast Asia. The rock pinnacles have formed stone forest similar to limestone outcrops in southern China.

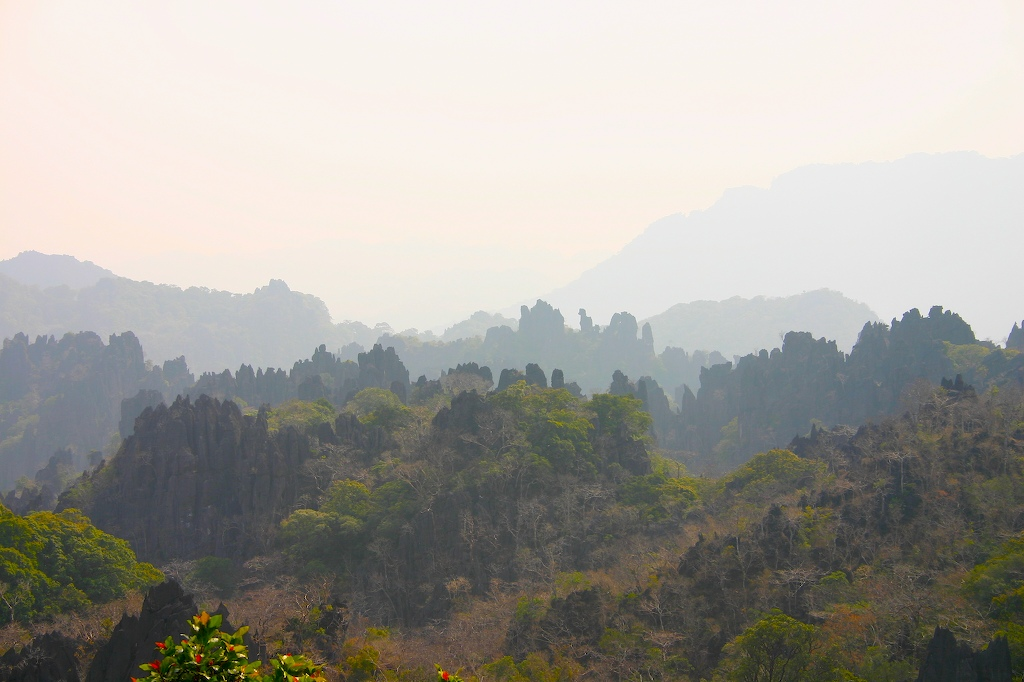
Karst rock formations

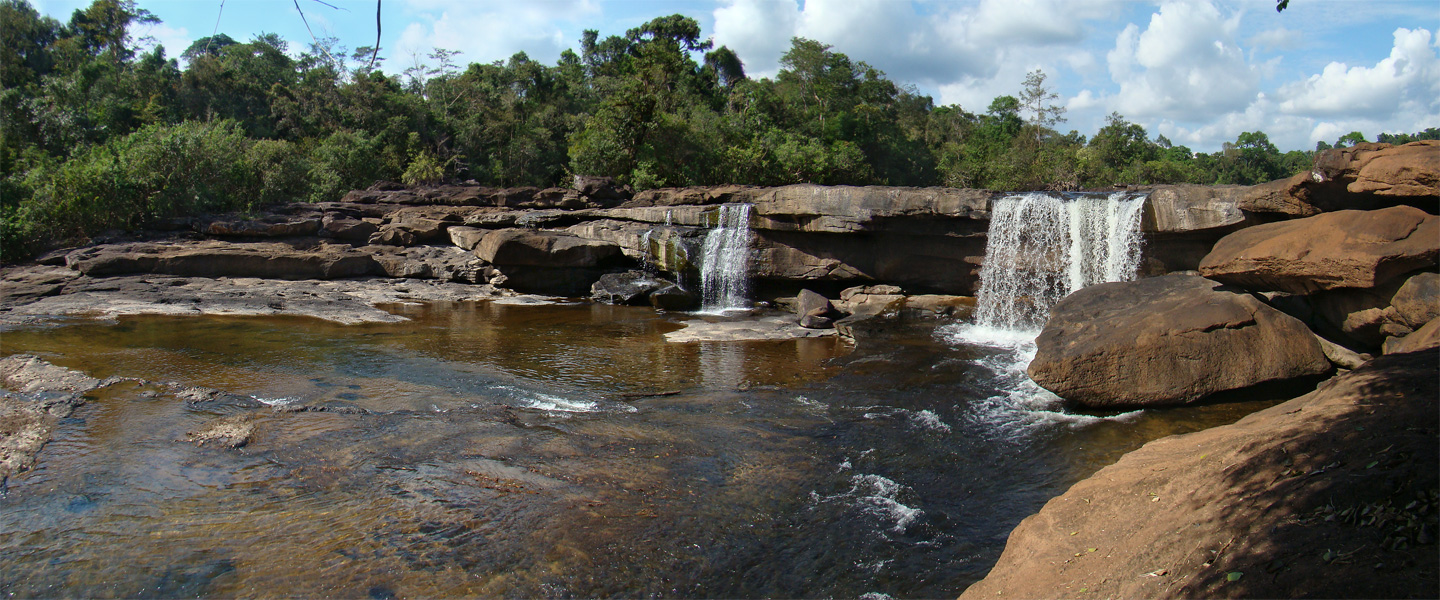
Tad Leuk, Phou Khao Khouay National Protected Area

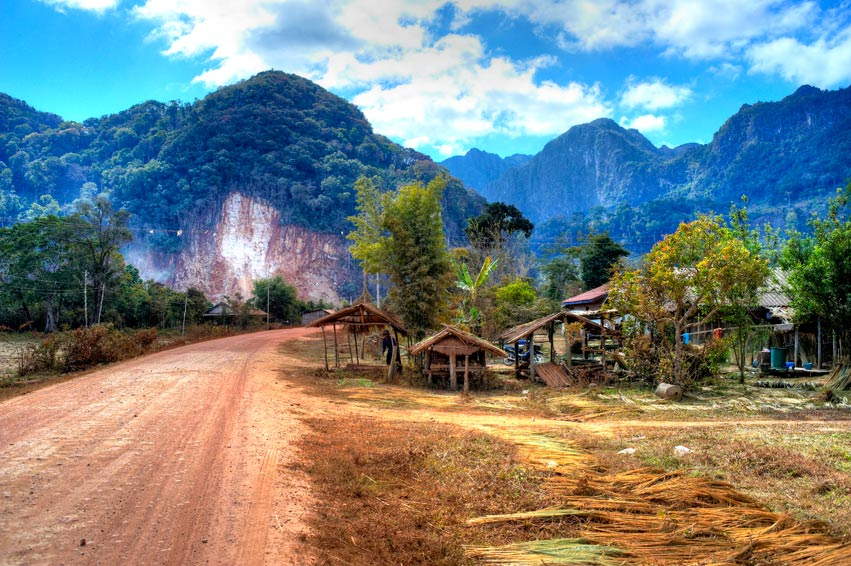
Landscape, Lak Sao

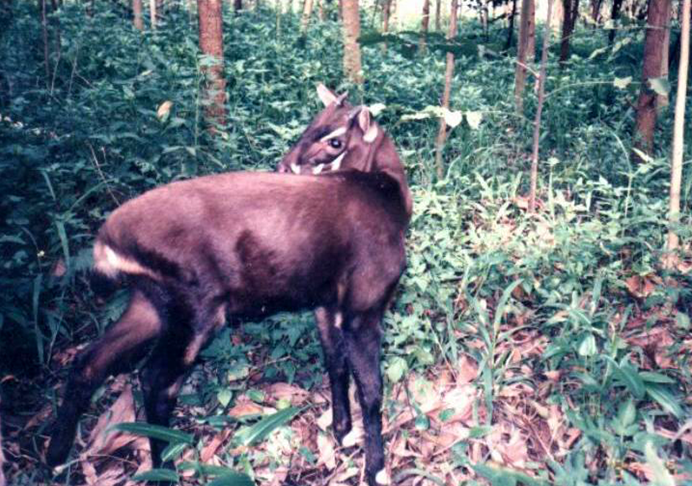
Saola (Pseudoryx nghetinhensis)

== Protected areas ==
At 4,270 square kilometres (1,650 sq mi), Nakai-Nam Theun National Park in Bolikhamsai and Khammouane provinces is the third largest protected area in Laos. It includes mixed semi-tropical forests, reported in areas of Indochina. Other protected areas include Nam Kading National Protected Area and the Phou Khao Khouay National Protected Area.

Under the World Wildlife Fund (WWF) Greater Mekong Lao PDR Country Programme, studies have been carried out in the two forest areas in the province to assess the degree of sustainable rattan harvest and production as it provides income in whole of the Mekong region to rural villages. The forest areas covered are 349 ha of forest area in Ban Soupphouan (Nong Kan and Phu Sangnoy villages) and 364 ha in Phonthong. The species sampled were mak naeng (cardamom), bamboo shoots of many species, all year san (Lao lady palm), mushrooms, pak van, kha (galangal), wai houn (Calamus melanochaetes, syn. Daemonorops jenkinsiana, rattan), phak kout (vegetable fern), wai khom (C. viminalis rattan), ya houa and ka don nam.

Mammals include tigers, Malayan sun bears, guars, giant muntjacs, elephants, clouded leopards, and Asiatic black bears. The mammal species protected under the Nam Kading National Protected Area are four critically endangered and endangered primate species: northern white-cheeked gibbons, southern white-cheeked gibbons, red-shanked douc langurs and two leaf-monkey species. Bird species recorded in the province are bulbuls such as the bare-faced bulbul (Pycnonotus hualon), thrushes and the green cochoa (Cochoa viridis). 4 species of hornbills are reported.

== Administrative divisions ==
The province is made up of the following districts:

| Map | Code | Name | Lao script |
|---|---|---|---|
| | 11–01 | Pakxan District | ເມືອງປາກຊັນ |
| | 11–02 | Thaphabat District | ເມືອງທ່າພະບາດ |
| | 11–03 | Pakkading District | ເມືອງປາກກະດິງ |
| | 11–04 | Borikhane District | ເມືອງບໍລິຄັນ |
| | 11–05 | Khamkeut District | ເມືອງຄຳເກີດ |
| | 11–06 | Viengthong District | ເມືອງວຽງທອງ |
| | 11–07 | Xaichamphon District | ເມືອງໄຊຈໍາພອນ |

== Economy ==
Laos's largest hydroelectric project, Nam Theun 2 Dam (NT2), began operation in March 2010. The scheme diverts water from the Nam Theun, a tributary of the Mekong River, to the Xe Bang Fai River, enabling a generation capacity of 1,070 MW, from a 350 m (1,148 ft) difference in elevation between the reservoir and the power station. At the time of signing in 2005, NT2 was the largest foreign investment in Laos, the world's largest private sector cross-border power project financing, the largest private sector hydroelectric project financing, and 1 of the largest internationally financed IPP projects in Southeast Asia. The dam marked a return by the World Bank to funding infrastructure, after a decade-long hiatus. The dam exports energy to neighboring Thailand. Along with Khammouane and Savannakhet provinces, it is a tobacco producing area of Laos, and a producer of sugar cane and oranges.

== Landmarks ==
Wat Phabath and Wat Phonsanh temples are pilgrimage centres between Vientiane and Pakxan. Wat Phabath is said to have a footprint of Buddha and murals. The location provides vistas of the Mekong River.
