= Ban Pha Tang =

- Town
- Location within Laos
- Coordinates: 19°4′38″N 102°25′31″E
- Country: Laos
- Province: Vientiane
- Time zone: UTC+7 (Laos Standard Time)

Ban Pha Tang or Ban Phatang is a small town in Vientiane Province, Laos. It is located 10.2 kilometres (6.3 mi) north along Route 13 from Vang Vieng, north of Ban Pakpo, on the bank of the Nam Song River. From Ban Pha Tang, the road climbs steeply to Ban Phahom, Ban Thieng and Muang Kasi. Lonely Planet describes it as a "pretty riverside village named after Pha Tang, a towering limestone cliff. The town's bridge offers a very photogenic view of its namesake." Phatang Resort lies to the south of the settlement.

During the Vietnam War, the Pathet Lao regularly bombarded the town, and it was eventually abandoned for a period. The Battle of Ban Pha Vang took place here in April 1962. In 1973, Ban Pha Tang was occupied with troops of Li Wen-huan's Third Army. Seabee-BPP have reportedly involved with the construction of new BPP camps at Ban Pha Tang, Ban Paeng Chan and Ban Voen.
