= Ban Phahom =

- Village
- Location within Laos
- Coordinates: 19°4′38″N 102°25′31″E
- Country: Laos
- Province: Vientiane
- Time zone: UTC+7 (Laos Standard Time)

Ban Phahom, also Phahom and Ban Thamtem, is a village in Vientiane Province, Laos. It is located north along Route 13 from Vang Vieng, 5.9 kilometres (3.7 mi) to the northwest of Ban Pha Tang. The terrain is mountainous and steep. The name means "narrow cliff" because the village is "bounded to the north by the vertical face of an about 60 m high rock which protrudes dramatically."
