= Ban Naxay =

Village In Laos

Ban Naxay is a village within the Vang Vieng District, Vientiane Province, Laos. It is located approximately 135 km (84 mi) north of the capital, Vientiane, and is situated in the midst of limestone karst cliffs and lush wet-season rice paddies. The karst landscape, formed over millions of years through the dissolution of limestone, is a defining feature of central Laos, particularly in Vang Vieng and its surrounding villages... These limestone formations contribute to the area's rich biodiversity and create the striking scenery that attracts ecotourism and agricultural activity. The fertile lowlands support rice cultivation, which thrives during the wet season, reinforcing the area's reliance on traditional farming practices.

== Public services and infrastructure ==
Ban Naxay is accessible via Route 13, the main highway running through Laos, which connects Vientiane and Luang Prabang while passing through Vang Vieng and nearby villages such as Ban Naxay and Ban Nampé. A significant upgrade to this route was completed on December 20, 2020, improving road conditions and enhancing accessibility for both local villagers and visitors.

Alongside these infrastructure developments, the region has also experienced advancements in mobile connectivity. While specific data on Ban Naxay's 5G availability is limited, coverage maps indicate the presence of 3G, 4G, and 5G networks in the area, suggesting an ongoing expansion of digital infrastructure that extends to villages like Ban Naxay.

=== Healthcare ===
There are insufficient healthcare facilities in the village, and villagers are required to make the trip to Vang Vieng, which is a tourist town neighboring their area, for access to health facilities. Vang Vieng's economy highly relies on the tourism industry, which generates substantial revenues. This tourism dependency has been coupled with increased investment in infrastructure to absorb the growing volumes of tourists. This has been accompanied by ensuing public safety problems like instances of illicit alcohol and drug use.

=== Local shops and facilities ===
Simple commodities are available from small roadside shops in Ban Naxay. Villagers go to Vang Vieng for more significant purchases since more commodities and services are available there. This is a reflection of the meager commercial infrastructure in rural settings and the central role of towns like Vang Vieng as centers for providing basic services to surrounding communities. These results are in line with rural trends across national Laos, where infrastructure investment has improved some facilities but continues to leave rural areas with limited access to a variety of public services. Initiatives like the Poverty Reduction Fund seek to enhance rural access to education, sanitation, and health care, mitigating some of these disparities.

== Demographics ==
Ban Naxay has a population of approximately 393 individuals, including 101 males and 292 females. The village is occupied by 137 households with an average household size of 2.87 members. The non-Tai-Kadai ethnic group consists of 25 individuals, making up 18.07% of the population. The poverty rate in the village stands at approximately 3.65%. In spite of this, based on observations in 2025, the village population has been increasing, much of it driven by the number of children within the community.

=== Ethnic composition and culture ===
A majority of the population in Ban Naxay consists of the Lao Loum, although Khmu and Hmong also exist in smaller numbers. Even though there is no precise figure that reflects the ethnic makeup properly, the most prevalent religion in the village is Buddhism. Some of the population is Christian, that is, among the displaced people due to the Nam Ngum 2 Hydropower Project. The cultural and religious dynamics of the village have been influenced by the resettlement process, as evidenced in research on the social and cultural impacts of displacement.

=== Agriculture and cultivation ===
Agriculture is the economic mainstay of rural Laos, with rice cultivation at its foundation because it provides livelihood for the majority of communities. Farmers primarily cultivate glutinous (sticky) and non-glutinous species of rice, which form the staple of the Laotian diet. This is the major practice of the Hmong ethnic group, wherein swidden (slash-and-burn) agriculture is employed. Their agricultural systems can include intercropping with corn, some tubers, vegetables, and squashes, contributing to dietary diversity

Besides rice, numerous vegetables and fruits are cultivated, complementing the local cuisine. Pumpkins, cucumbers, and greens are common vegetables, while bananas, oranges, and papayas are fruits. For instance, in Oudomxay province, an assortment of crops is cultivated such as corn, soybeans, fruit, vegetables, cassava, sugarcane, tobacco, cotton, tea, and peanuts. Farmers use intercropping among different local varieties such as Khau Hay (upland rice), Mak Duoi (sorghum), and Xa Ly (corn), alongside vegetables such as Mak Teng (cucumber), Mak Keo (Pachyrhizus erosus), and pumpkin

== Tourism ==
=== Angsavanh Resort ===
Located in Vang Vieng, Angsavanh Resort (ອ່າງສະຫວັນລີສອດ) offers the visitor a scenic ambiance, complete with a garden, a sun deck, and views over the mountains. The resort lies approximately 8.8 km from Blue Lagoon and Tham Phu Kham Cave, making it an appropriate accommodation for individuals who will benefit from experiencing comfort while also being close to nature points of interest. The peaceful surroundings offer the visitor a chance to unwind while being close to some of the most visited spots in Vang Vieng.

=== Blue Lagoon 3 ===
Blue Lagoon 3 is one of the newer and less visited lagoons located about an hour outside of Vang Vieng, and it is the farthest of the Blue Lagoons from Vang Vieng. Despite being far away, it's a popular local spot with a variety of activities including a zip line, swings, balance beams, and bamboo rafts. Visitors can also cool off at the cool, crystal-clear water, which reflects the surrounding hills. The 21,000 Kip entrance fee (roughly USD $1.50) is needed to enter the lagoon opening.

There's also Phaboun Cave, an adventure for those who yearn for something out of the ordinary. There is a slight climb before it reaches the cave opening, and visitors can navigate through the dark, cool inside using flashlights. Inside, travelers stroll along wooden ladders, past breathtaking stalactites and stalagmites, some forming crystal-like curtains. Travelers arrive at a tiny underground lake after about 30 minutes' walking and may swim into an extra section of the cave. The water is crystal clear and warm to swim in, an unusual and not-to-be-forgotten sensation.

=== Impact of Tourism on Vang Vieng and Ban Naxay ===
The rise in tourism in Vang Vieng has significantly impacted nearby areas like Ban Naxay. On the positive side, tourism has boosted the local economy through the development of guesthouses, restaurants, and tour agencies, providing employment opportunities for residents. Additionally, infrastructure improvements, such as enhanced road access, have benefited both locals and visitors.

However, rapid tourism development has also led to serious challenges. Environmental concerns have emerged due to the overuse of natural attractions, leading to pollution and degradation of caves, rivers, and lagoons. Moreover, the influx of tourists and commercialization have disrupted traditional lifestyles, with locals feeling that their social and cultural fabric is being eroded.

One notable impact of tourism in Vang Vieng has been the commercialization of "tubing," where tourists float down the Nam Song River. In the early 2000s, this activity gained immense popularity but lacked safety measures. The combination of alcohol consumption and river activities led to numerous accidents. In 2011, the local hospital recorded 27 tourist deaths due to drowning or diving injuries, primarily on a bar-heavy stretch of the river less than 1 km long.

More recently, in November 2024, six foreign tourists, including two Australian teenagers, two Danish women, a British lawyer, and an American tourist, died from suspected methanol poisoning after consuming contaminated alcohol at a local hostel in Vang Vieng. This incident has raised significant concerns about safety standards and the regulation of alcohol production in the area.

=== Transport ===
Ban Naxay can be accessed from the capital city, Vientiane, along Route 13 North. By car, the journey lasts approximately three hours, traversing some 160 kilometers. It is accessible by travelers from Vang Vieng who just have to follow the signs on the road to the village. Though the road development of the country has been boosted by the increase in tourism, the remoteness of the site means that the village has a peaceful environment removed from other more crowded tourist sites.
