= Ban Nampo =

- Village
- Location within Laos
- Coordinates: 18°57′36″N 102°26′51″E
- Country: Laos
- Province: Vientiane
- Time zone: UTC+7 (Laos Standard Time)

Ban Nampo is a village in Vientiane Province, Laos. It is located north along Route 13 from Vang Vieng, not far from the eastern bank of the Nam Song River. The Nam Po River flows into the Nam Song to the south. To the north is the village of Pak Pok.
