= Tham Non =

Cave in Laos

Coordinates: 17°24′N 104°55′E

Tham Non is a cave to the north of Vang Vieng, Laos. It is located in close proximity to the Nam Song River.
