= Ban Pakpo =

- Village
- Location within Laos
- Coordinates: 18°59′16″N 102°26′40″E
- Country: Laos
- Province: Vientiane
- Time zone: UTC+7 (Laos Standard Time)

Ban Pakpo, also Pak Pok or Pakpo, is a village in Vientiane Province, Laos. It is located north along Route 13 from Vang Vieng, not far from the eastern bank of the Nam Song River. To the northwest of the village is the Tham Pha Thao cave and the Tham Sang Triangle of four caves.
