= Tham Sang Triangle =

Cave system in Laos

The Tham Sang Triangle refer to a group of four caves in close proximity, located roughly 8 kilometres (5.0 mi) north of Vang Vieng, Laos, to the northwest of the village of Ban Pakpo. The four caves are Tham Sang, Tham Hoi, Tham Loup, and Tham Nam. The name "Tham Sang" refers to the stalactites within them which are said to resemble elephants, a characteristic in particular of the Tham Sang cave. The entrance has a grey boulder on the right side with a red flower bush beyond that. Tham Hoi is considered the most sacred to locals, with a larger Buddha head in the entrance, whilst Tham Loup is noted for its stalactites. Tham Nam, meaning "water cave", is located roughly 400 metres (1,300 ft) south of Tham Hoi.
