= Tham Jang =

Cave in Laos

Coordinates: 18°54′36″N 102°26′33″E

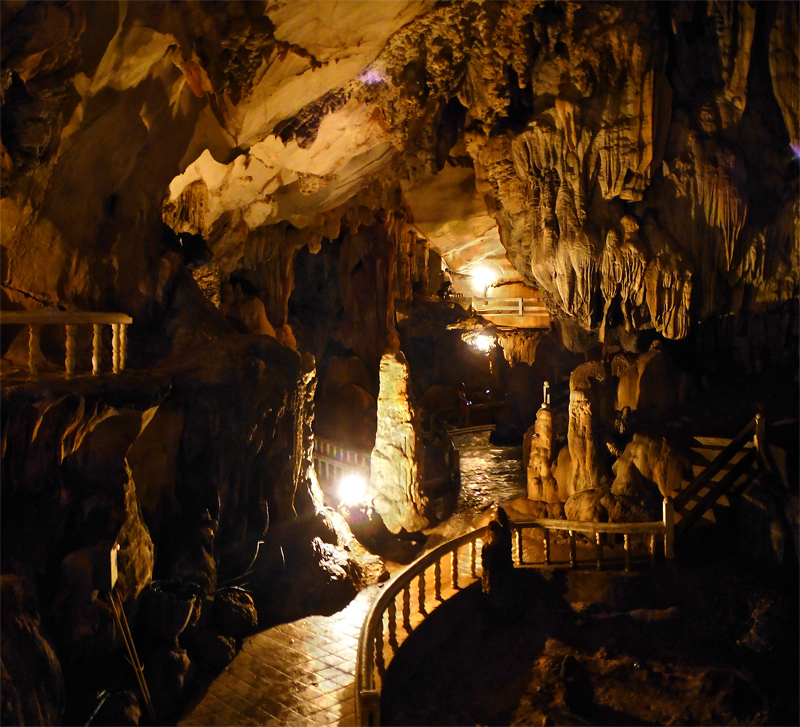
Inside Tham Jang

Tham Jang is a cave just to the southwest of Vang Vieng, Laos. Approached by a bridge over the Nam Song River and then a long flight of steps, a spring is located about 50 metres (160 ft) inside the cave. The cave was used as a bunker in the early 19th century during the Chinese-Ho invasion.
