= Muang Phôn-Hông =

Muang Phôn-Hông ໂພນໂຮງ Phonghong
- Town
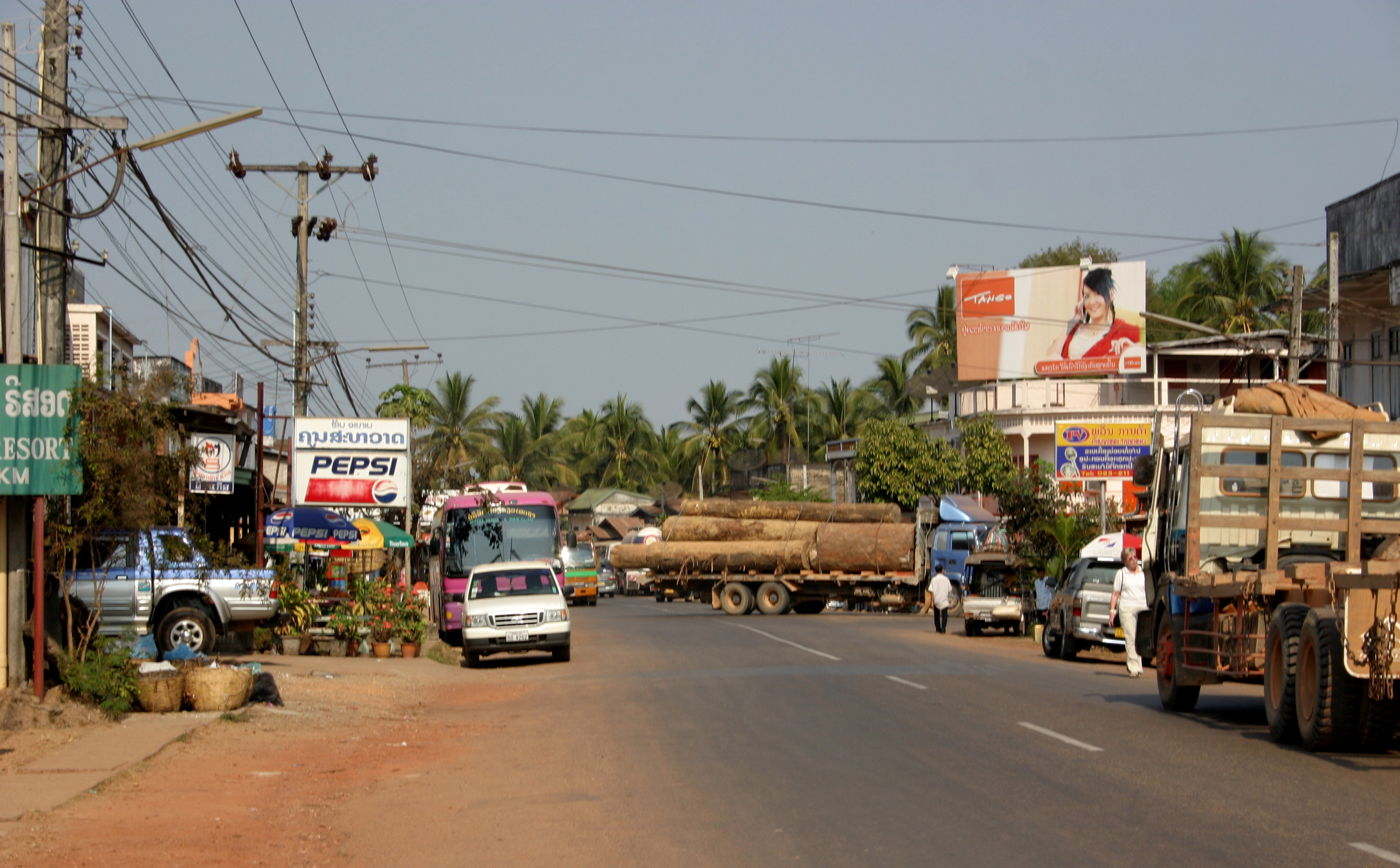

- Location within Laos
- Coordinates: 18.5007177°N 102.4166072°E

Population (2015)
  - Total: 30,805

Muang Phôn-Hông, also known as Phonhong, (Lao language: ໂພນໂຮງ, pronounced [pʰóːn hóːŋ]) is a town and capital of Vientiane Province, Laos. The town had a population of 30,805 in 2015.

== Gallery ==
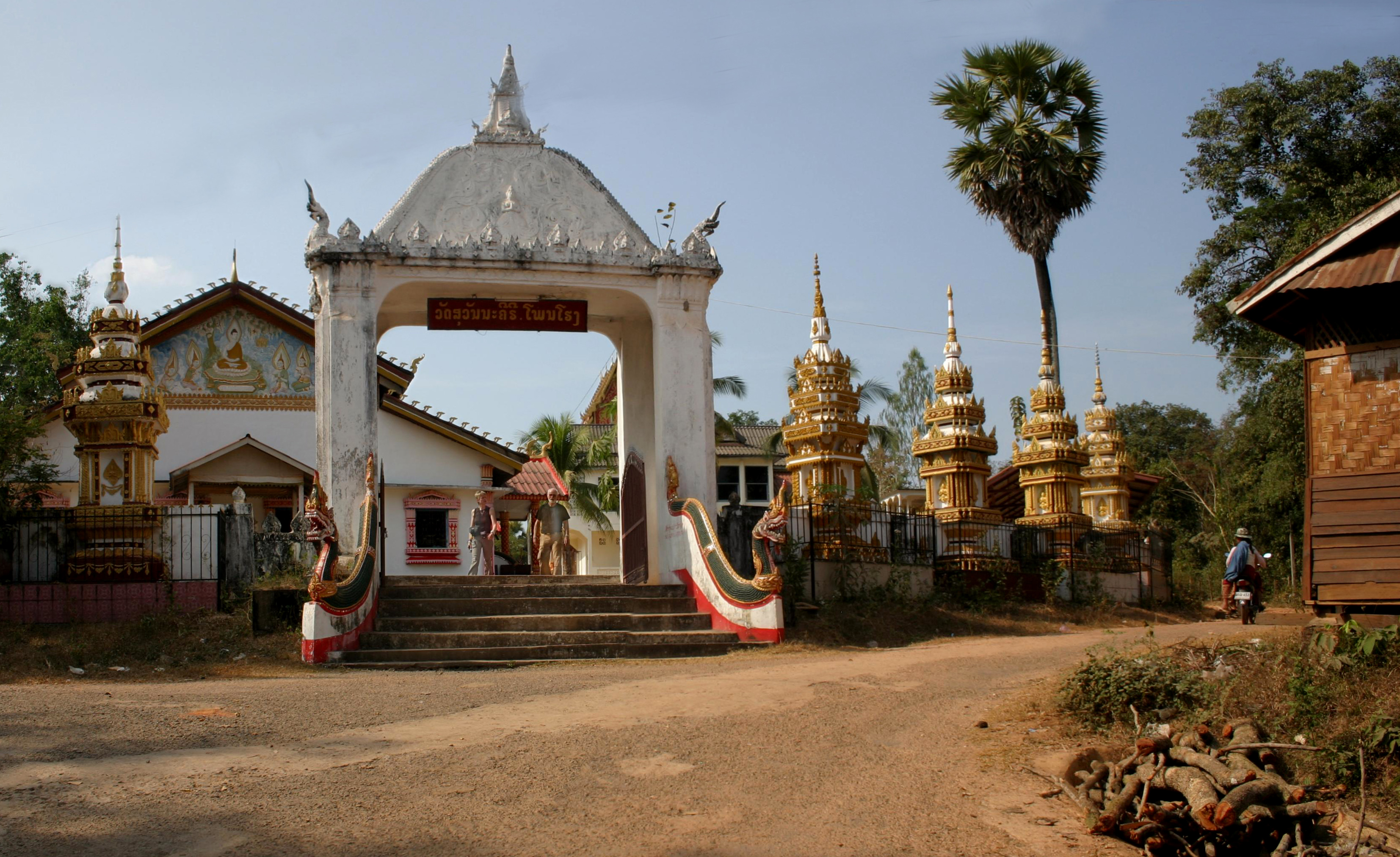

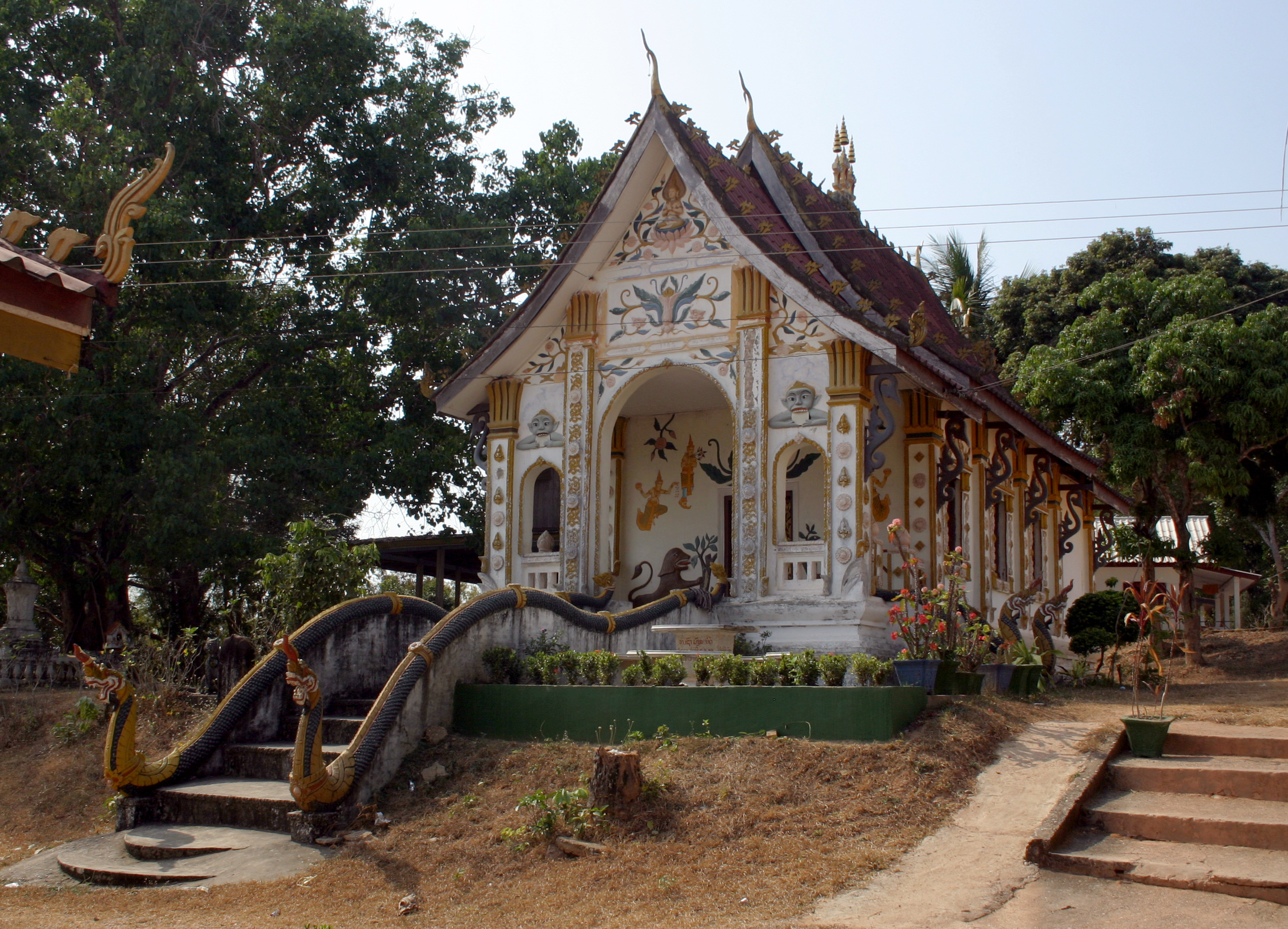

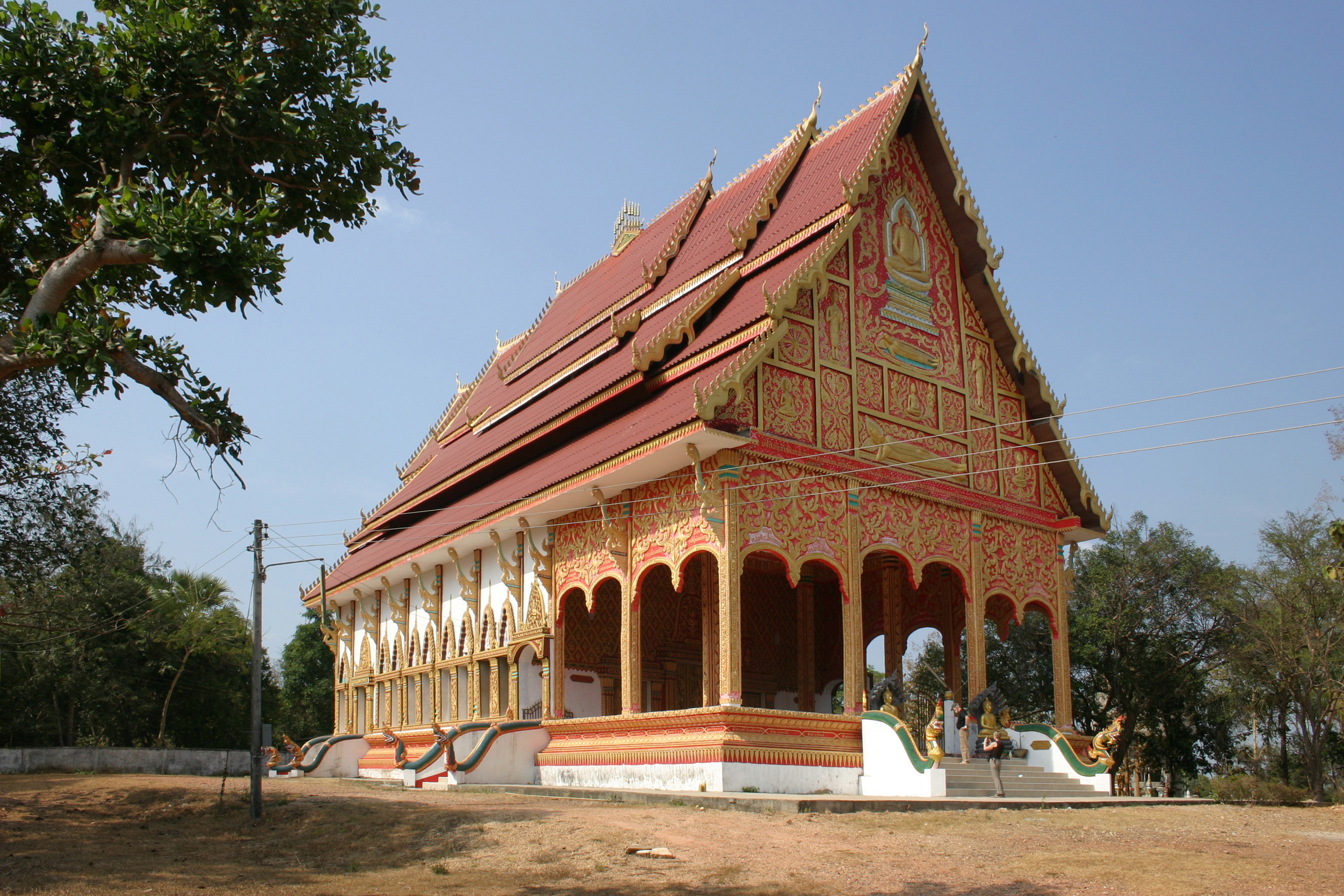

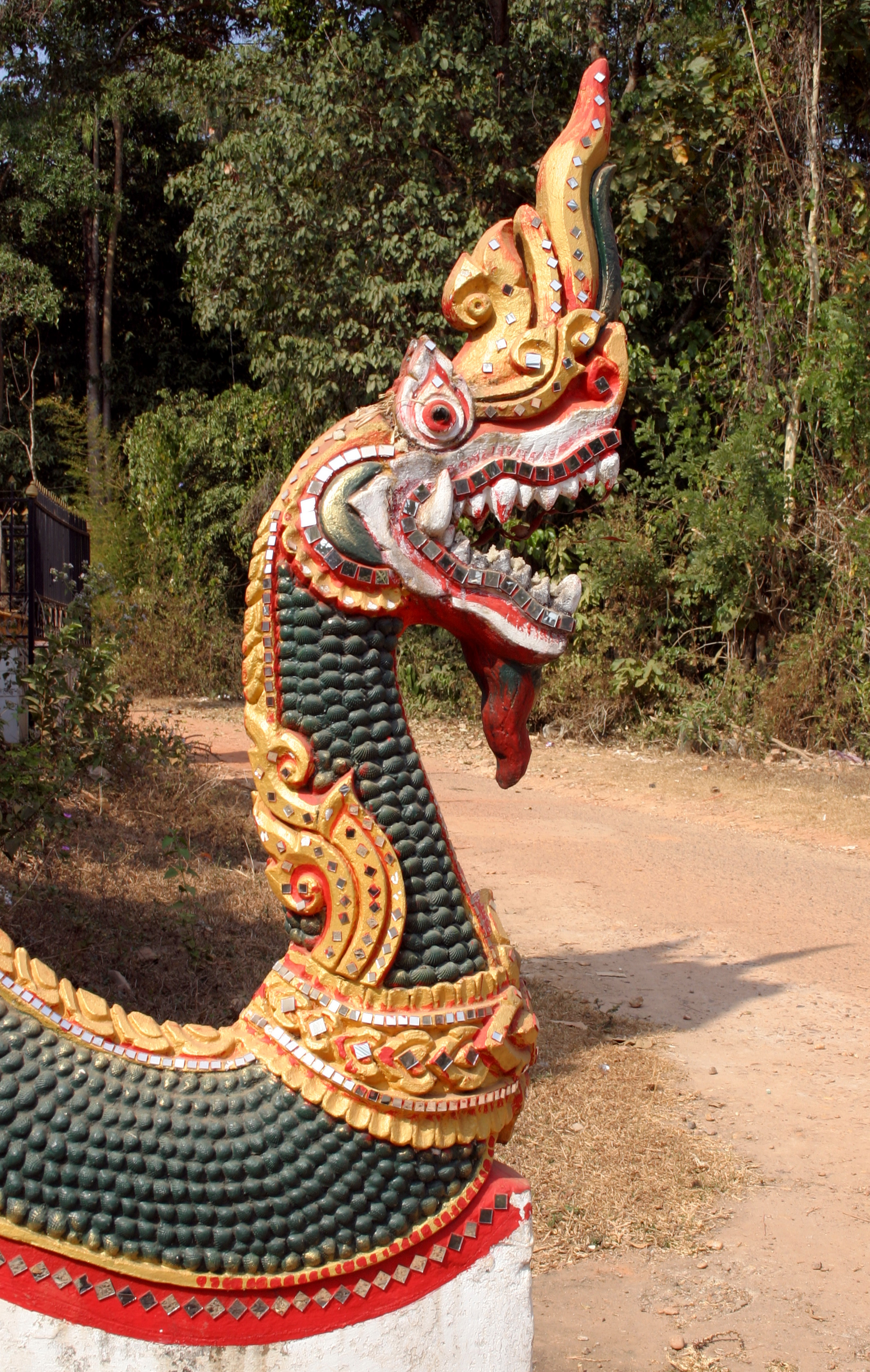

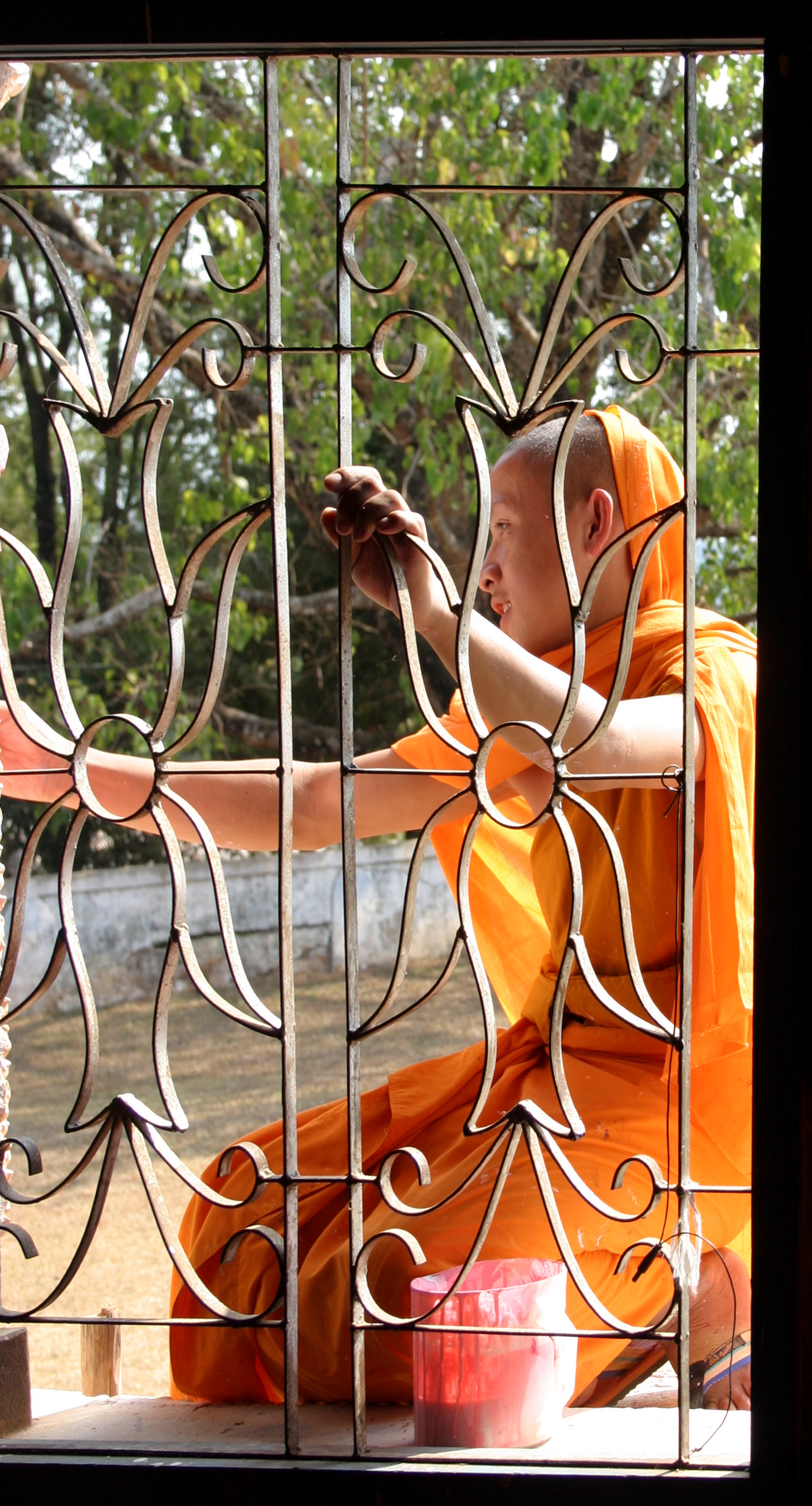

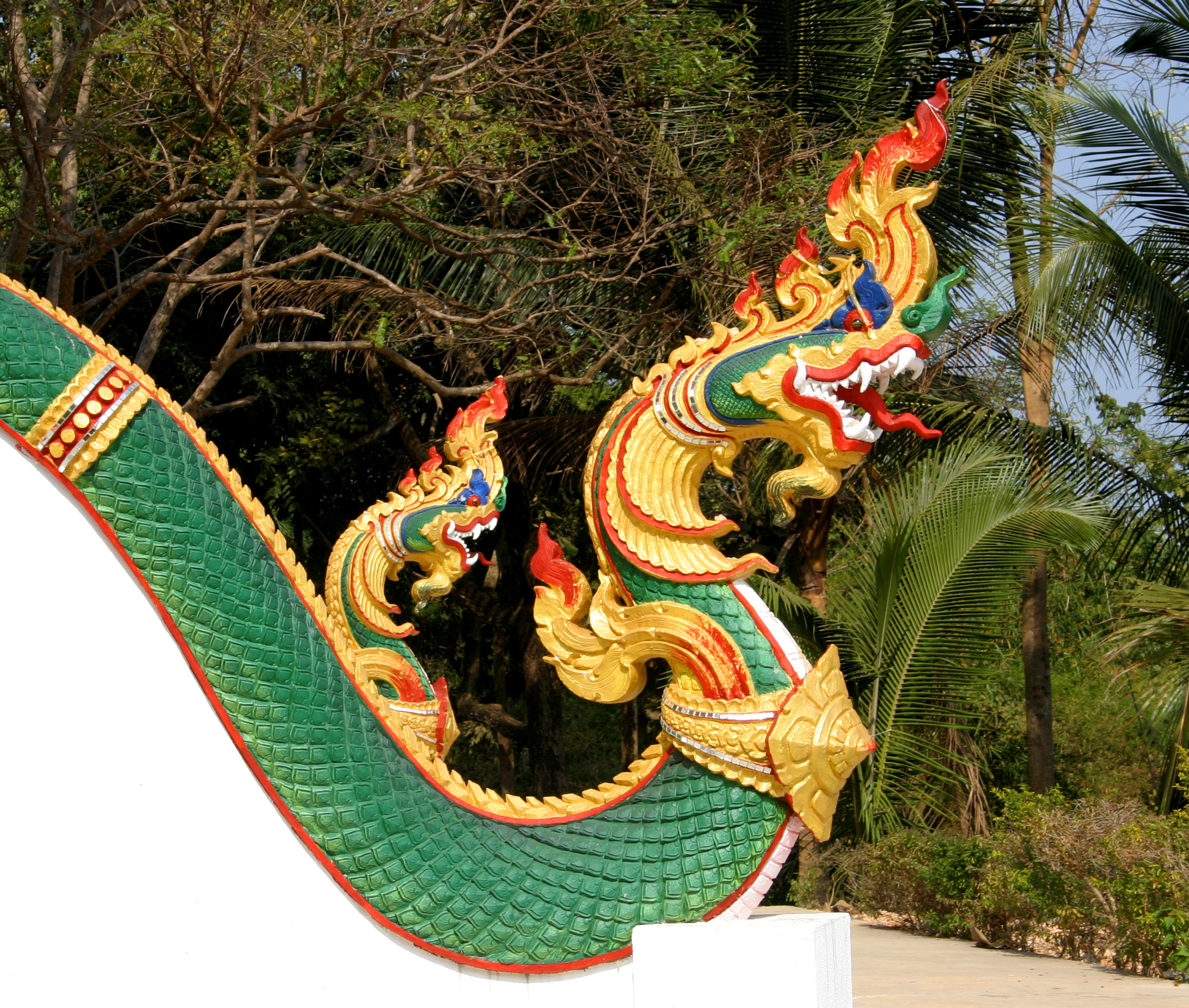

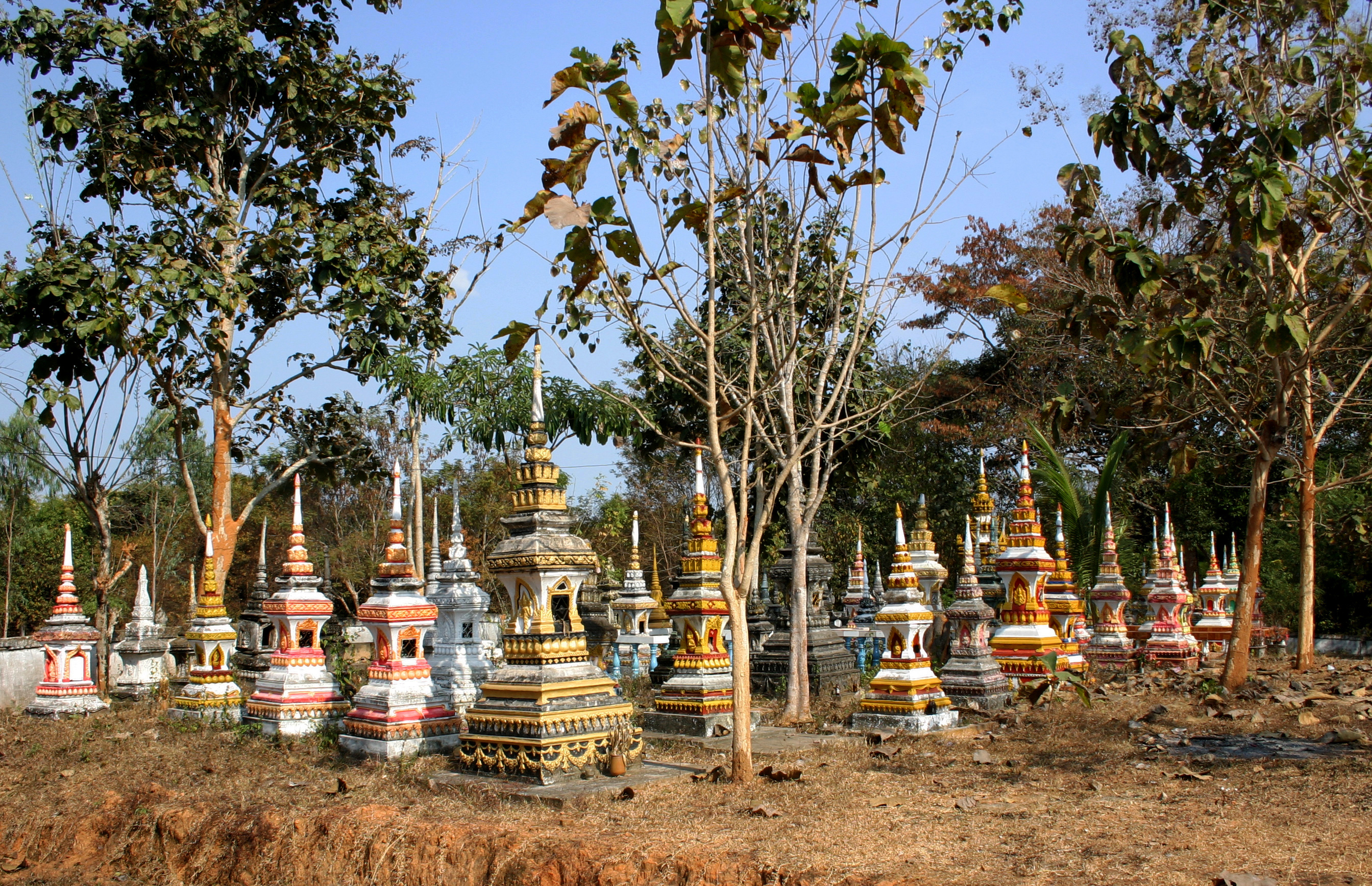
