= Hinhurp district =

Hinhurp ເມືອງຫີນເຫີບ
- District
- Hinhurp district
- Location of Hinhurp district in Laos
- Country: Laos
- Admin. division: Vientiane province
- Time zone: UTC+7 (ICT)

Hinhurp is a district of Vientiane province, Laos.
