= Muang Kasi =

- Town
- Location within Laos
- Coordinates: 19°14′N 102°15′E
- Country: Laos
- Province: Vientiane Province
- Time zone: UTC+7 (Laos Standard Time)

Muang Kasi is a river town in Vientiane Province, Laos. It is located to the north of Ban Thieng along Route 13. The Pathet Lao were active in Muang Kasi.
