= Tham Phu Kham =

Cave to the northwest of Vang Vieng, Laos

Tham Phu Kham is a cave to the northwest of Vang Vieng, Laos, located just to the northeast of the village of Ban Na Thong. Its name means "Blue Lagoon" due to its blue waters. The cave is revered by the locals and contains several Buddha images. The largest is a reclining bronze Thai Buddha in the main cave.
