= Ban Thieng =

- Village
- Location within Laos
- Coordinates: 19°08′N 102°14′E
- Country: Laos
- Province: Vientiane Province
- Time zone: UTC+7 (Laos Standard Time)

Ban Thieng is a river village in Vientiane Province, Laos. It is located to the northwest of Vang Vieng off Route 13.
