= Vientiane province =

Province of Laos

- Province
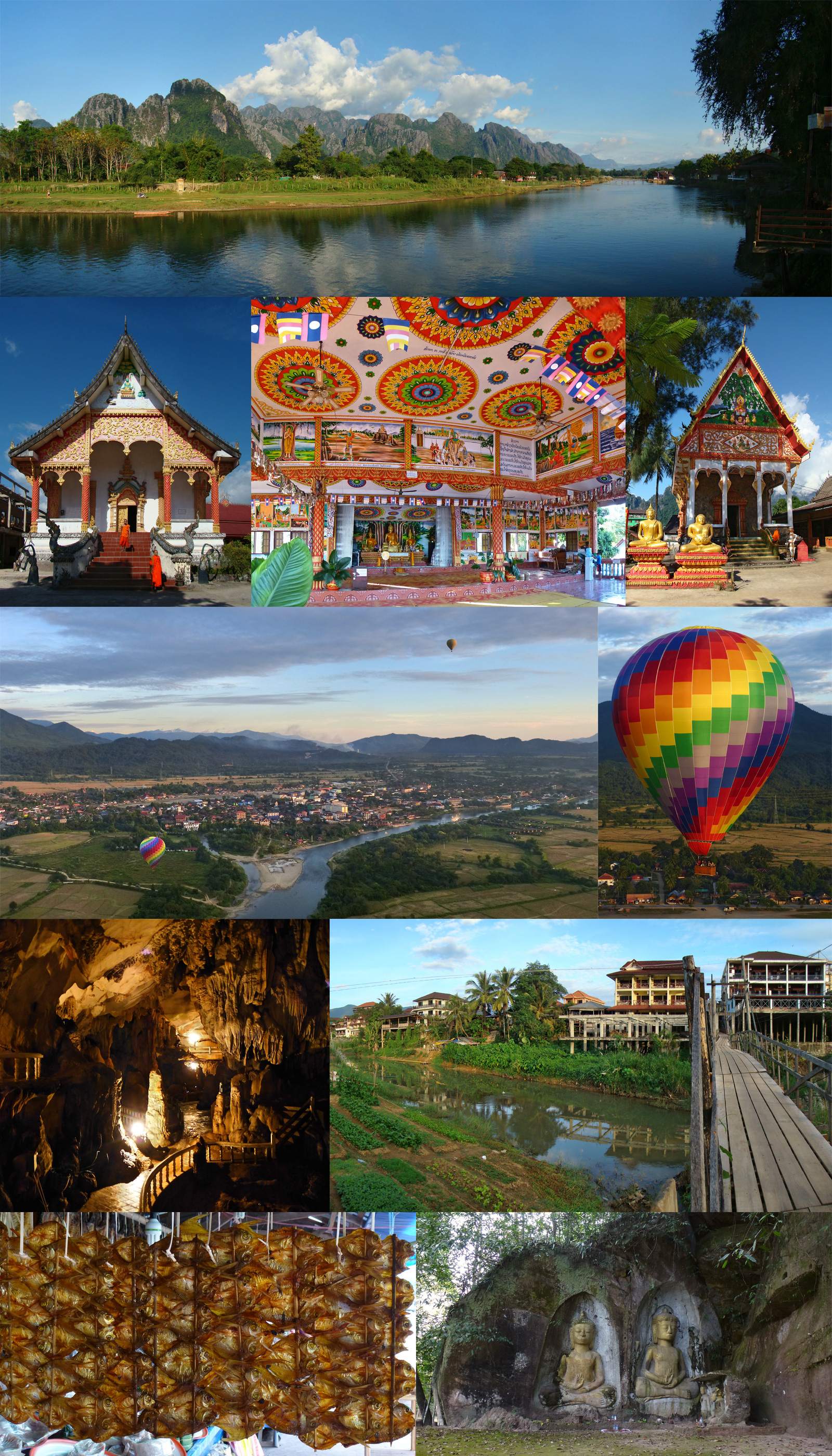

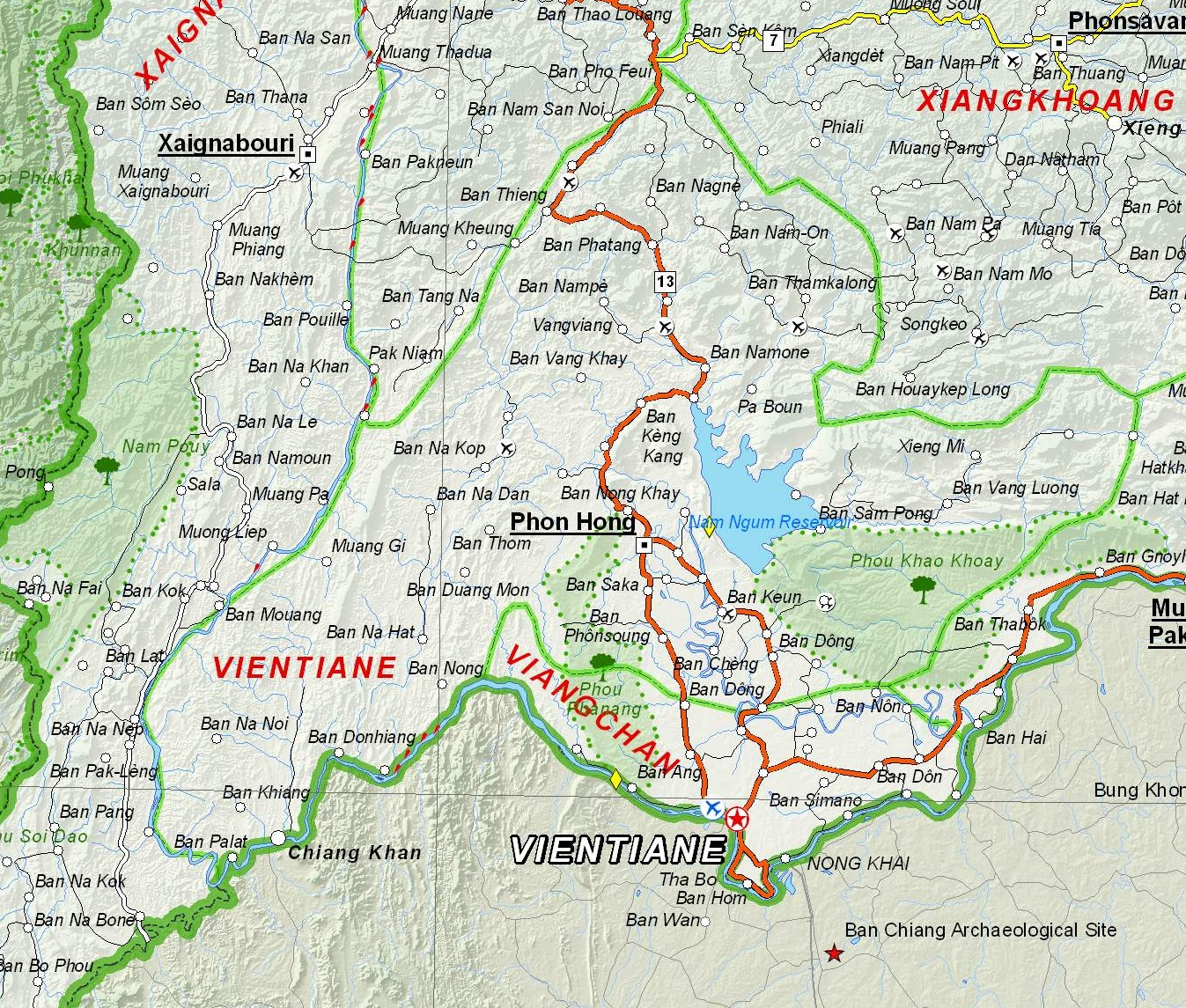
- Map of Vientiane province

- Location of Vientiane province in Laos
- Coordinates: 18°38′34″N 102°19′25″E
- Country: Laos
- Established: 1989
- Capital: Muang Phôn-Hông

Area
  - Total: 15,610 km^{2} (6,030 sq mi)

Population (2020 census)
  - Total: 462,142
  - Density: 29.61/km^{2} (76.68/sq mi)
- Time zone: UTC+7 (ICT)
- ISO 3166 code: LA-VI
- HDI (2022): ▲0.633 medium · 5th

Vientiane province (Lao: ແຂວງວຽງຈັນ, pronounced [kʰwɛ̌ːŋ wíaŋ tɕàn]) is a province of Laos in the country's northwest. As of 2015 the province had a population of 419,090.

In the 16th century, Vientiane, under King Setthathirat's rule, became a centre of Buddhist teachings and temples were built.

== Geography ==
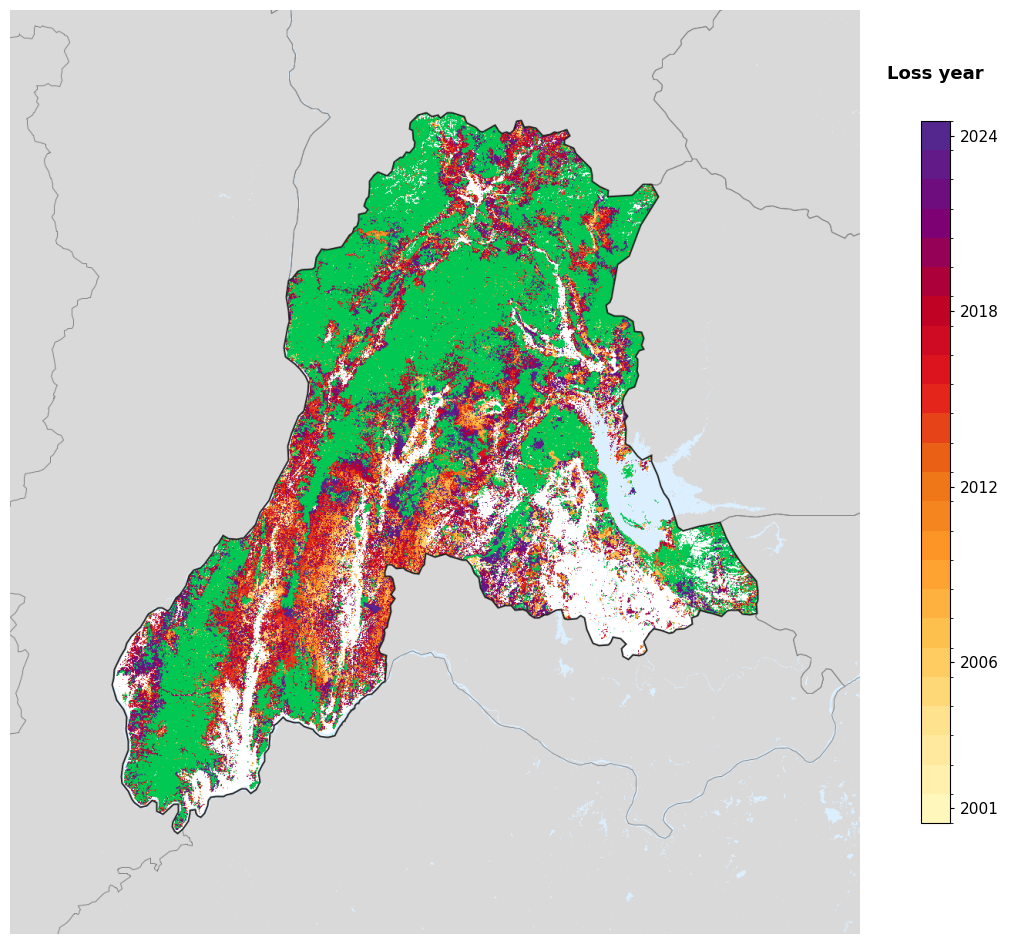
Tree-cover loss year in Vientiane province, 2001-2024, from the Global Forest Change dataset.

Vientiane covers an area of 15,927 square kilometres (6,149 sq mi) with 10 districts. The province borders Luang Prabang province to the north, Xiangkhouang province to the northeast, Bolikhamxai province to the east, Vientiane prefecture and Thailand to the south, and Xaignabouli province to the west. The principal towns are Vang Vieng and Muang Phôn-Hông. Vang Vieng is connected to Vientiane, roughly 170 kilometres (110 mi) by road to the south and Luang Prabang to the northwest by Route 13, a highway in the province, followed by Route 10. Most of the population of the province lives in the towns and villages along and near Route 13. From the south to the north these include Ban Phonsoung, Ban Saka and Toulakhom (along Route 10 east of Route 13), Ban Nalao, Ban Nong Khay, Ban Keng Kang, Ban Vang Khay, Ban Houay Pamon, Ban Namone, Vang Vieng, Ban Nampo, Ban Phatang, Ban Bome Phek, Ban Thieng, Muang Kasi and Ban Nam San Noi near the border with Xiangkhouang province.

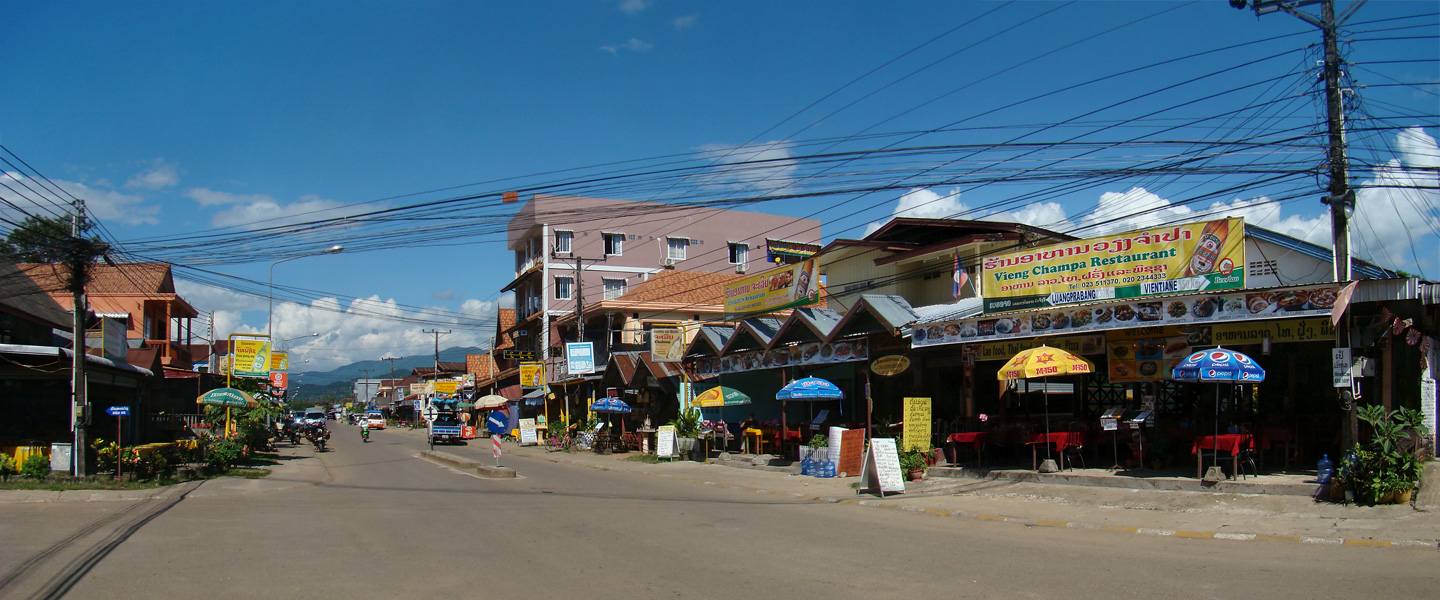
Vang Vieng centre

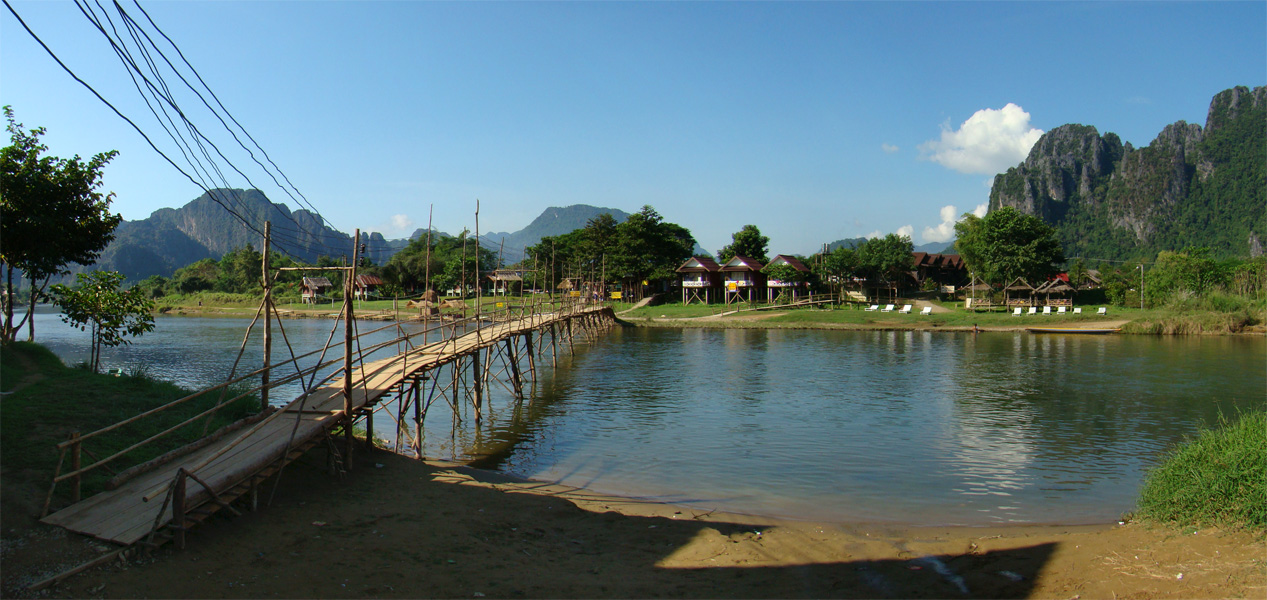
Nam Song in Vang Vieng

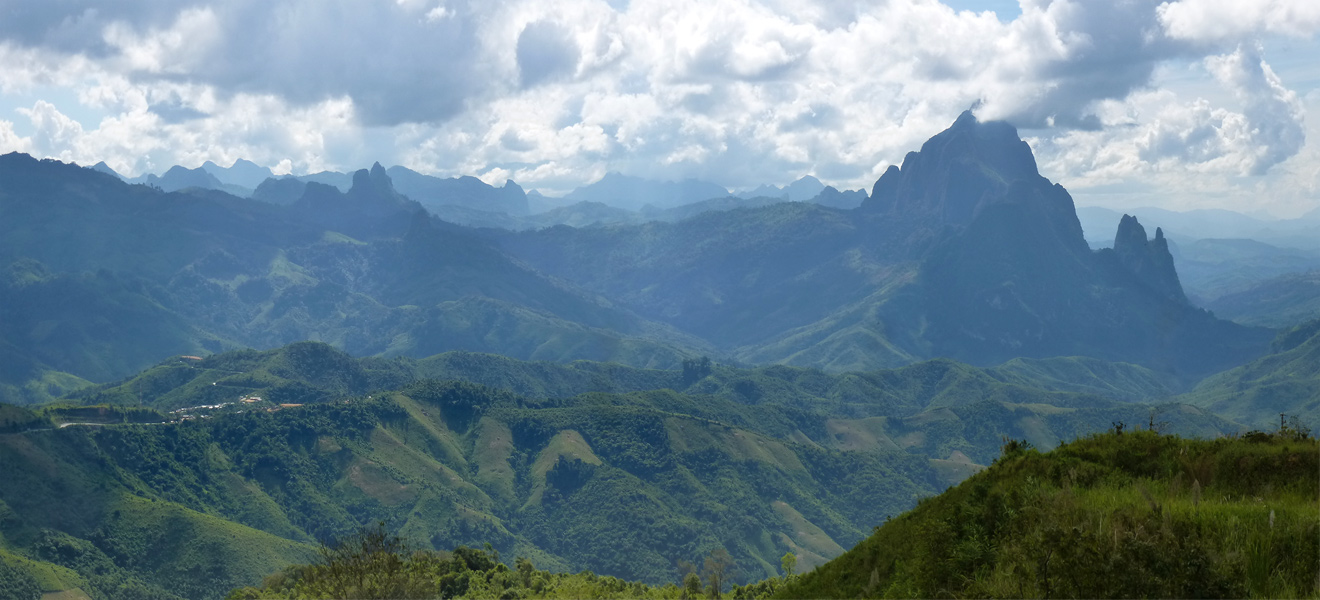
Phu Phra mountain

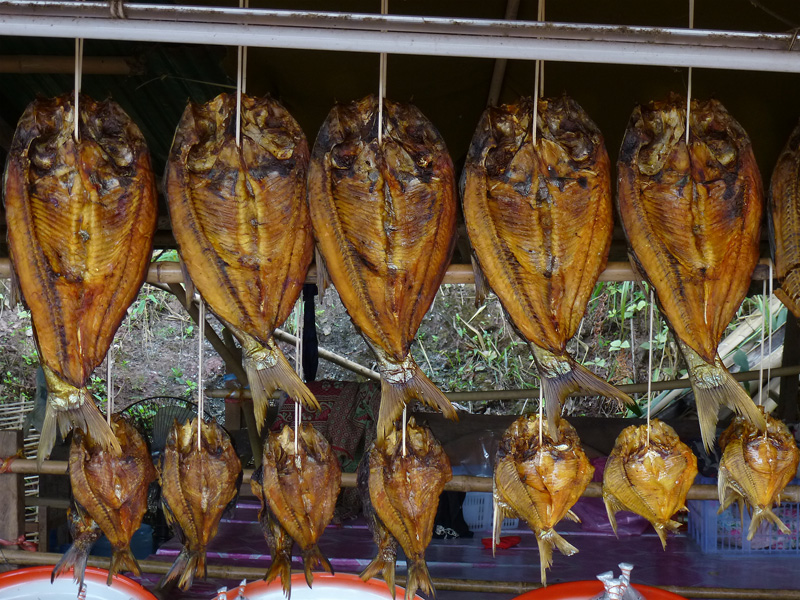
Fish from the Nam Ngum

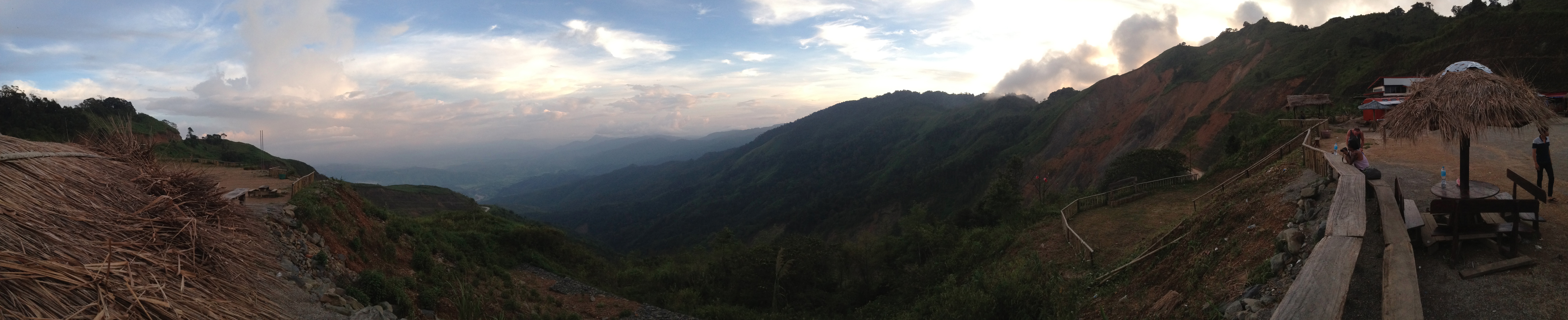
Mountain ranges from Kasi Viewpoint, between Luang Prabang and Vang Vieng

=== Protected areas ===
Phou Khao Khouay National Biodiversity Conservation Area is a protected area 40 kilometres (25 mi) northeast of Vientiane. It was established on 29 October 1993 covering an area of 2,000 km^{2} extending into Khet Phiset Xaisomboon (special zone), Vientiane prefecture, and Vientiane province. Its topography, with elevation varying from 200 m to 1761 m, emerged from "uplifting and exposure of the underlying sedimentary (Indosinias schist-clay-sandstone) complex". Sandstone is seen spread in layers. It has a stretch of mountain range with sandstone cliffs, river gorges and 3 rivers with tributaries which flow into the Mekong River. It has monsoonal climate with recorded annual rainfall of 1936 mm (with higher reaches recording more rainfall). The mean annual temperature is 26.6 °C with a mean maximum of 31.6 °C and a mean minimum temperature of 21.5 °C. The forests are evergreen, Shorea mixed deciduous forest, dry dipterocarp and pine type; particularly coniferous forest, of monospecific stands of Pinus latteri, Fokienia hodginsii, bamboo (mai sanod), and fire-climax grasslands. Animals found here include elephants, tigers, bears, white-cheeked gibbons, and langurs and species of reptiles, amphibians, and birds. The green peafowl has been reported here, near Ban Nakhay and Ban Nakhan Thoung; conservation management has increased its population.

Ban Na Reserve is a wildlife protected area. The habitat is known for its bamboo, dense forest and wild elephants.

The Mekong channel upstream of Vientiane Important Bird Area (IBA) is 18,230 hectares in size. As its name implies it comprises an approximately 300 kilometres (190 mi) section of the Mekong upstream of Vientiane. It spreads over 2 provinces: Vientiane and Sainyabuli. The topography features braided streams, bushland, gravel bars, open sandy islands, rock outcrops, and sand bars. Avifauna include great thick-knees (Esacus recurvirostris), Jerdon's bushchat (Saxicola jerdoni), river lapwing (Vanellus duvaucelii), small pratincole (Glareola lactea), and wire-tailed swallow (Hirundo smithii). Around the village of Ban Sivilay, a bird sanctuary has flocks of whistling ducks and egrets roosting.

=== Administrative divisions ===
The province is composed of 11 districts:

Map	Code	Name	Lao script
	10-01	Muang Phôn-Hông	ເມືອງໂພນໂຮງ
	10-02	Thoulakhom District	ເມືອງທຸລະຄົມ
	10-03	Keo Oudom District	ເມືອງແກ້ວອຸດົມ
	10-04	Kasy District	ເມືອງກາສີ
	10-05	Vangvieng District	ເມືອງວັງວຽງ
	10-06	Feuang District	ເມືອງເຟືອງ
	10-07	Xanakharm District	ເມືອງຊະນະຄາມ
	10-08	Mad District	ເມືອງແມດ
	10-09	Viengkham District	ເມືອງວຽງຄໍາ
	10-10	Hinhurp District	ເມືອງຫີນເຫີບ
	10-11	Meun District	ເມືອງໝື່ນ
	~~10–11~~	~~Hom District~~	~~ເມືອງໝື່ນ~~
	~~10–12~~	~~Xaisomboun District~~	~~ເມືອງໄຊສົມບູນ~~

== History ==
In the 1950s and 1960s during the French-Indo China War and Vietnam War, thousands of refugees arrived in the province. By 1963, some 128,000 at arrived, especially Hmong people from Xiengkhouang province. Some 150,000 more arrived in the 1970s. Some of the refugees arrived were addicted to opium.

In 2006, 13 ethnic Khmu Christians were arrested in the village of Khon Kean. 1 was released in April 2007, and on 16 May, 9 others were released after being held at a police facility in Hin Heup.

The border area near Xaisomboun province experiences violence between government forces and Hmong rebels.

== Demographics ==
Population figures for the province increased during the period between 1943 (23,200) to 1955 (45,000). The demographics for ethnic breakdown in 1943 were: Lao 41.5%; Vietnamese (Annamites) 53%; Chinese 4%; Others 1.5%. The population last reported was 419,090, as of the 2015 census with Muang Phôn-Hông as its capital.

== Economy ==
Investment has gone into the suburbs of Vientiane. A tile factory has been established in the village of Phai Lom and a bio-organic fertilizer factory has been established in the village of Dong Xiengdy. Another tile factory has been established in the village of Hathdeua, Keo Oudom District. Lonely Planet said of the impact of tourism upon the town of Vang Vieng, "The growth of Vang Vieng has taken its toll. Inevitably the profile of the town has changed and the reason travelers first came here- to experience small-town Laos in a stunning setting – has been replaced by multistorey guesthouses. Even the local market has moved to a big, soulless slab of concrete north of the town”. In the Ban Bo village of Thoulakhom District salt extraction is part time economic activity. The village is 60 kilometers from Vientiane and the extraction of salt is done by traditional methods.

Some rural peoples depend upon agriculture for their livelihoods. The Vientiane Plain which covers Vientiane province and Vientiane Municipality is 1 of the 6 major rice producing plains in Laos. Crafts and tailoring employs a number, and most rural villages in the province have tailors who make pants, shirts, mosquito nets and sheets. Herb doctors and carpenters are occupations “for a select few” in the villages. In the village of Ban Bo in Thoulakhom District is a salt extraction plant, employing most of the inhabitants in traditional extraction methods.

Operating companies in the mineral sector, as of 2008, include: Padeang Industry Public Co. Ltd, Phu Bin Ming Ltd, Laos Cement Co. Ltd, Wanrong Cement I, and Barite Mining Co. As of 2009, each of the 126 ministry offices in Vientiane had IT facilities, including "one server, 10 PCs, a teleconference room, and a local area network connected to the national e-government infrastructure."

== Landmarks ==
There are caves in the province, especially in the Vang Vieng area. Of note are the Patang, Patho Nokham, Vangxang and Tham Chang Caves. Vangxang Cave, also known as Elephant Court, contains the remains of a sanctuary which preexisted the Lane Xang Kingdom, and contains 5 pink sandstone sculptures and 2 Buddha images. Vang Vieng contains Buddhist temples dated to the 16th and 17th centuries; among them Wat Si Vieng Song (Wat That), Wat Kang and Wat Si Sum are of note. Ecotourism is a contributor to the provincial economy, and Adventure Lao manages a kayaking operation on the Nam Song River, Nam Ngum River and the Nam Lik River, which enables tourists to pass villages. There is an artificial lake near the village of Ban Sivilay village with a protected bird habitat. Also of note is Ban Ilai market in Muang Naxaithong, which sells basketry, pottery and other traditional crafts.

Water falls seen in Phu Khao Khuay are Tat Xai (which has 7 cascades), further downstream the Pha Xai (40 m fall) and Tat Luek.

Wat Pha Bhat Phonson at Tha Pha Baht is a rocky formation where Buddha foot prints, reclining Buddha and a monastery with ornamented stupa (built in 1933) are worshipped.

Ban Pako village in the midst of forests, 55 km away from Vientiane has eco-lodges created over a 40 ha forest preserve, which is a tourist attraction. The houses in this village are made of bamboo thatch at an isolated location stated to have been a settlement 2000 years ago which has been attested by archaeological finds of artifacts. A wat and a water fall are located here.

The Nam Ngum Reservoir on the Nam Ngum River, in the Nam Ngum Reserve is a water resources project which extends over a water spread area of 1,280 hectares during the monsoon season. The lake provides for recreational activities such as boating and picnics. In the Ban Thalad village of Keo-Oudom District, about 80 kilometres (50 mi) from Vientiane, there are floating restaurants and sporting activities.

Among the caves in the province, the Vangxang Cave also called the "Elephant Court" remnants of a sanctuary of the Lane Xang Kingdom are seen. It is approachable along Route 13 (north) located at km 48, the cave has 5 sculptures made of pink sandstone and 2 images of Buddha.

The Thoulakhom Zoo houses animals.

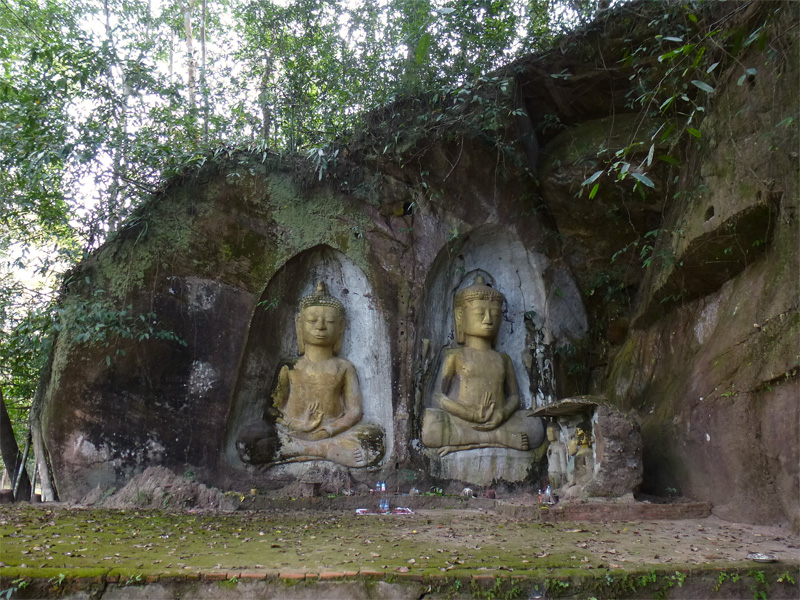
Vang Xang

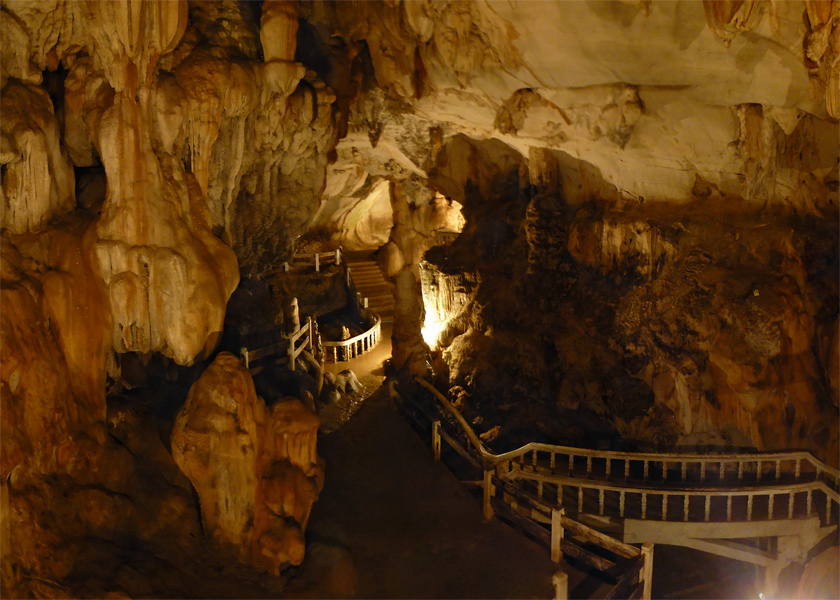
Tham Chang

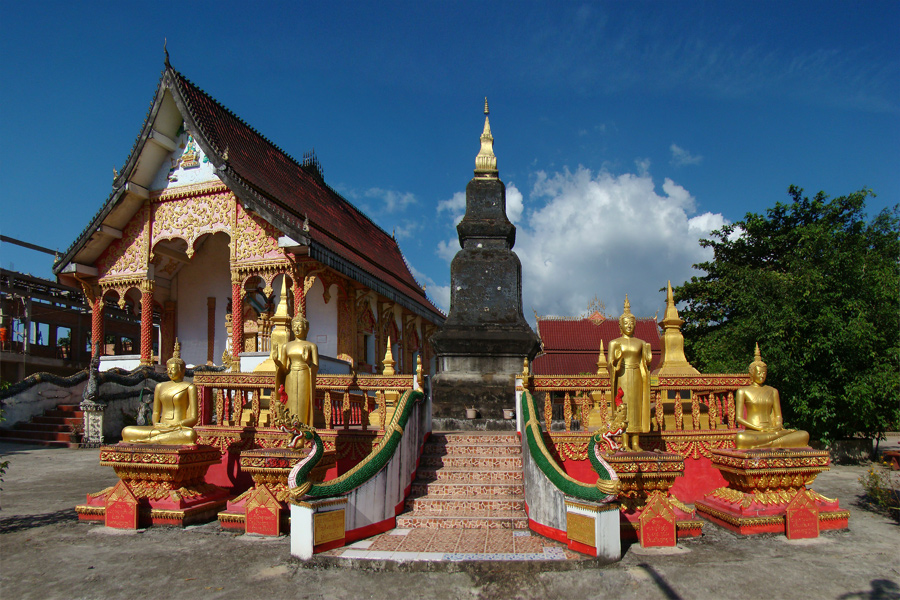
Wat Si Vieng Song

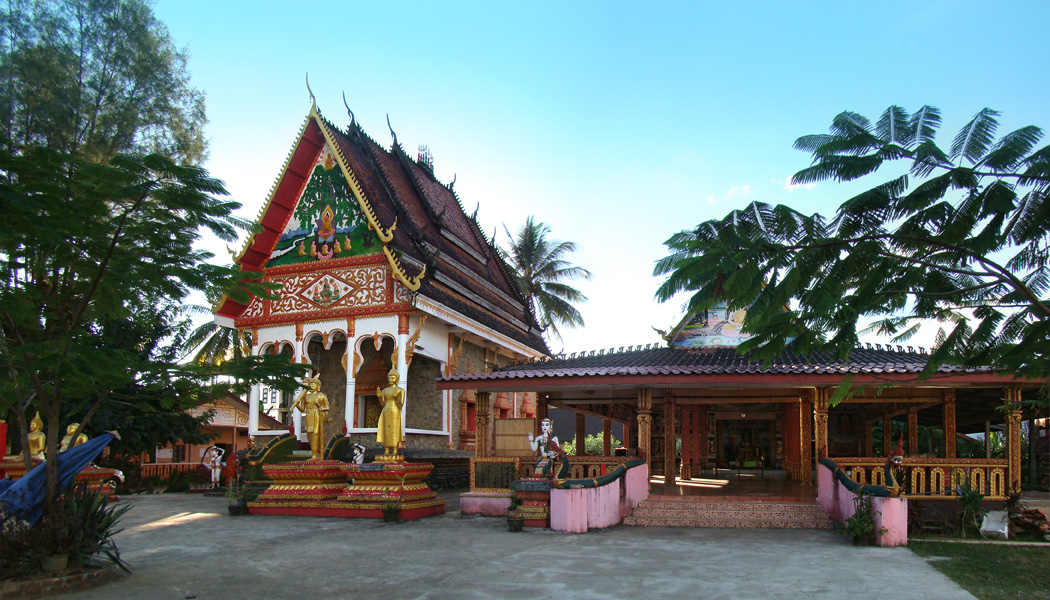
Wat Kang
