= Nam Song River =

River in Laos

Coordinates: 18°38′42″N 102°18′06″E

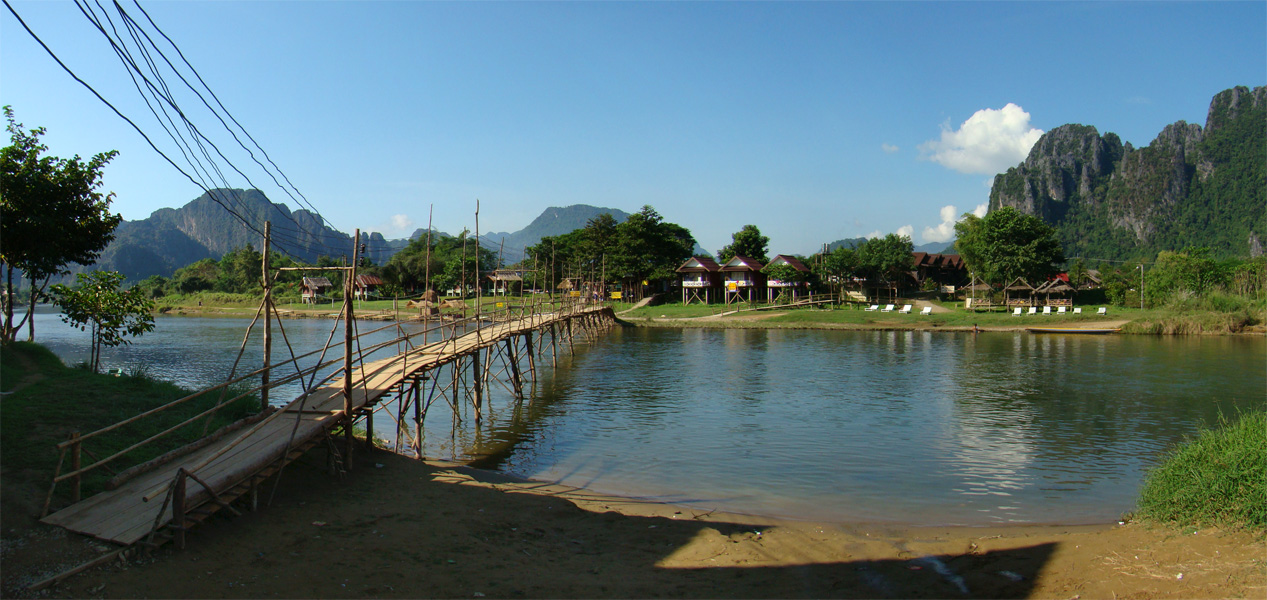
Bridge over the Nam Song River in Vang Vieng

The Nam Song River, also transliterated as Nam Xong, is a medium-sized river in Laos that flows through the town of Vang Vieng. It is a popular tourist destination as many people enjoy seeing the Laotian countryside while going down the river in the inner tube of a tractor tyre or in a kayak. The river is surrounded by striking karst rock formations. Upstream from Vang Vieng, numerous bars have been built on the river's banks to attract the tourists floating by.

Nam Song River is connected to Nam Ngum Reservoir by Nam Song Diversion Dam. The Nam Po River flows into the Nam Song just to the south of Ban Nampo village to the north of Vang Vieng.

== See also ==
- Nam Ngum
- Nam Ngum Dam
