= Vang Vieng =

Vang Vieng ວັງວຽງ
- City
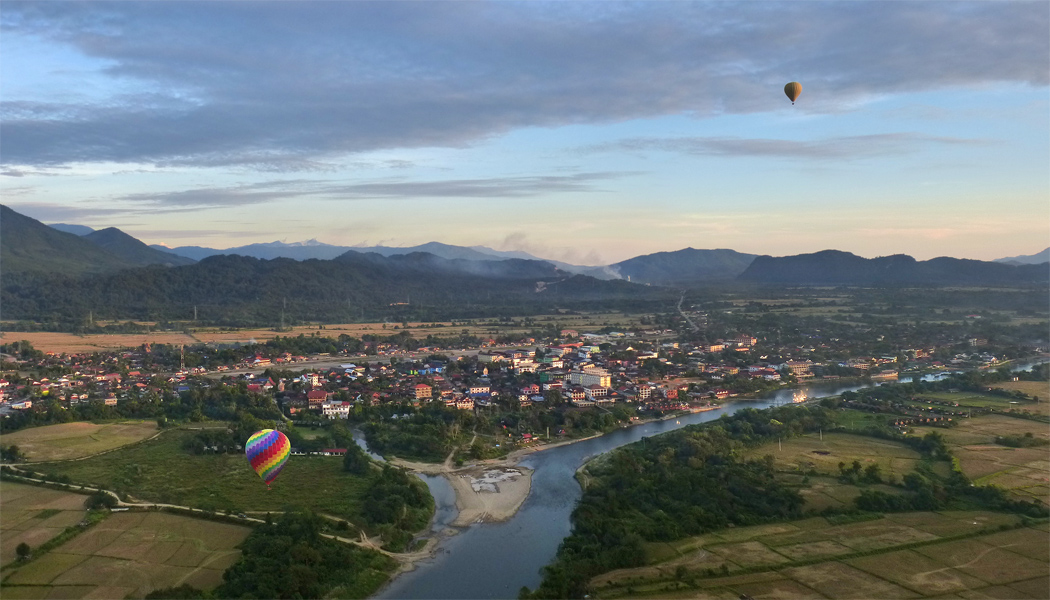
- Vang Vieng viewed from a hot air balloon

- Location in Laos
- Coordinates: 18°55′36″N 102°26′58″E
- Country: Laos
- Province: Vientiane Province

Population
  - Total: 25,000
  - Religions: Buddhism
- Time zone: UTC+7 (ICT)

Vang Vieng (Lao: ວັງວຽງ, pronounced [wáŋ wíaŋ]) is a city in the Vientiane Province of Laos. It is popular with tourists, specifically backpackers, seeking adventure sports as well as its karst topography. It is on the Nam Song River, 130km north of Vientiane (2 hours by car or bus).

== History ==
Vang Vieng was first settled around 1353 as a staging post between Luang Prabang and Vientiane. Originally named Muang Song after the body of the deceased King Phra Nha Phao of Phai Naam was seen floating down the river, the town was renamed Vang Vieng during French colonial rule in the 1890s.

Significant expansion of the town and its infrastructure occurred during the 1964-1973 Vietnam War when the US constructed an air force base and runway that was used by Air America. The airstrip was then called "Lima site 6". The runway has not been built on and can easily be seen via aerial or satellite images located between the main street and the national highway (Route 13). American plane hangars also remain in the area.

Since Laos opened up for tourism in the late 1990s, the town has grown substantially due to the influx of backpackers and associated business development. The town became popular with tourists due to the opportunities for adventure tourism along the Nam Song River and in the spectacular limestone karst landscape surrounding the town.

== Climate ==
Vang Vieng has a tropical monsoon climate according to the Köppen climate classification, with a distinct dry season and a lengthy and rainy wet season, totalling about 3300 millimeters a year. The wet season lasts seven months, from April to October, and is characterized by high amounts of rainfall, which peaks in July with an average of 840 millimeters. The dry season spans November to March, and features cooler temperatures than during the rest of the year. The weather in Vang Vieng is coolest during the months of December and January, and hottest from March to May. Overall, the temperature ranges from an average low of 13.5 °C in January to an average high of 34 °C in April.

Climate data for Vang Vieng
Month	Jan	Feb	Mar	Apr	May	Jun	Jul	Aug	Sep	Oct	Nov	Dec	Year
Mean daily maximum °C (°F)	28.1 (82.6)	30.5 (86.9)	32.6 (90.7)	34.0 (93.2)	32.9 (91.2)	32.3 (90.1)	31.1 (88.0)	31.0 (87.8)	31.4 (88.5)	31.0 (87.8)	29.5 (85.1)	27.5 (81.5)	31.0 (87.8)
Daily mean °C (°F)	20.8 (69.4)	22.8 (73.0)	25.2 (77.4)	27.5 (81.5)	27.8 (82.0)	27.9 (82.2)	27.3 (81.1)	27.2 (81.0)	27.1 (80.8)	25.8 (78.4)	23.6 (74.5)	20.8 (69.4)	25.3 (77.6)
Mean daily minimum °C (°F)	13.5 (56.3)	15.2 (59.4)	17.9 (64.2)	21.1 (70.0)	22.8 (73.0)	23.6 (74.5)	23.6 (74.5)	23.4 (74.1)	22.9 (73.2)	20.6 (69.1)	17.8 (64.0)	14.2 (57.6)	19.7 (67.5)
Average rainfall mm (inches)	9 (0.4)	18 (0.7)	49 (1.9)	174 (6.9)	369 (14.5)	489 (19.3)	840 (33.1)	662 (26.1)	508 (20.0)	115 (4.5)	44 (1.7)	23 (0.9)	3,300 (130)
Source: Climate-Data.org

== Transportation ==
The city is served by the Vientiane–Boten Expressway since its opening in 2020; previously the only major road access was through Route 13. It is served by a station on the Boten–Vientiane railway.

== Tourism ==
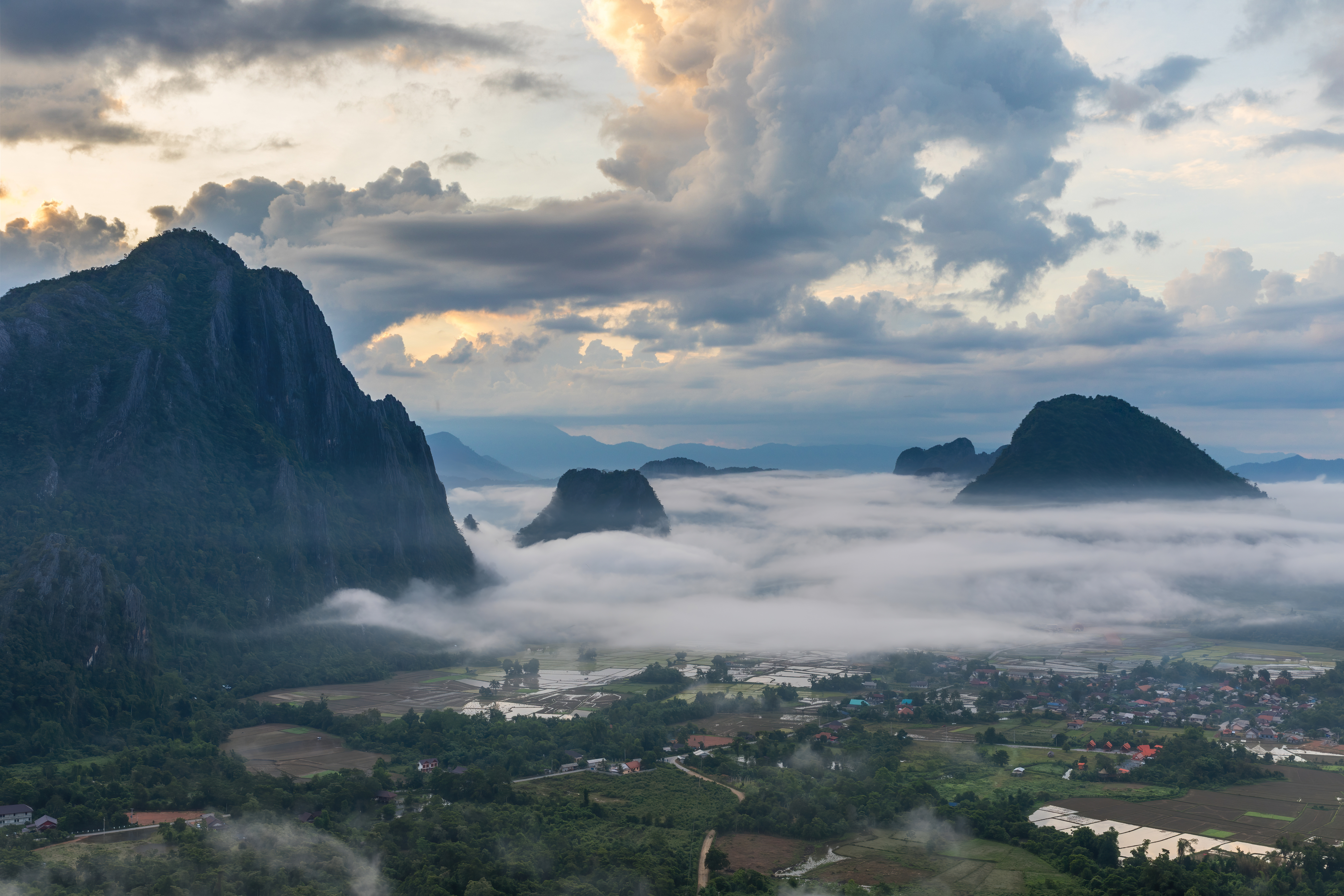
South view from the top of Mount Nam Xay during the monsoon

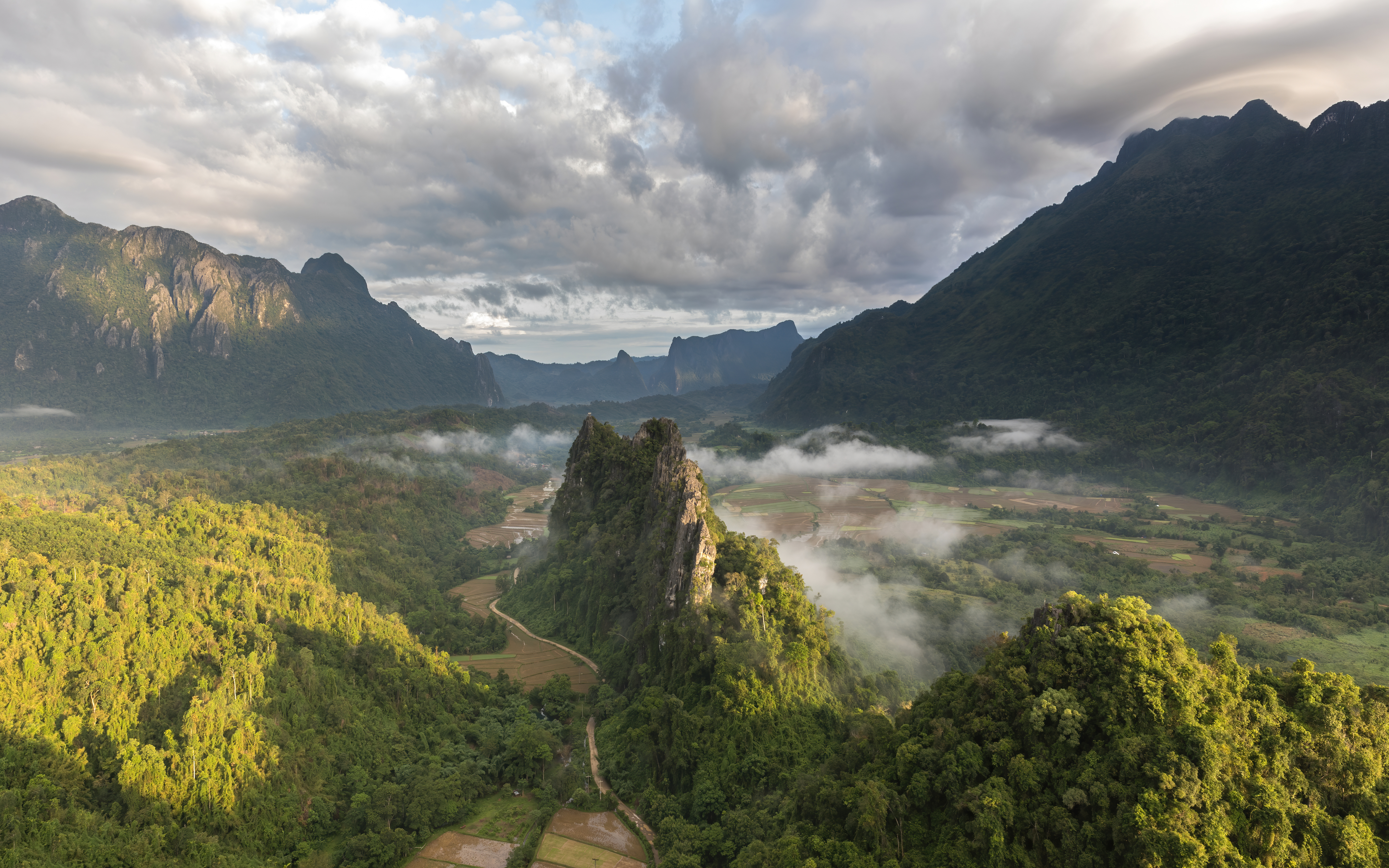
Landscape from the top of Mount Nam Xay, early morning

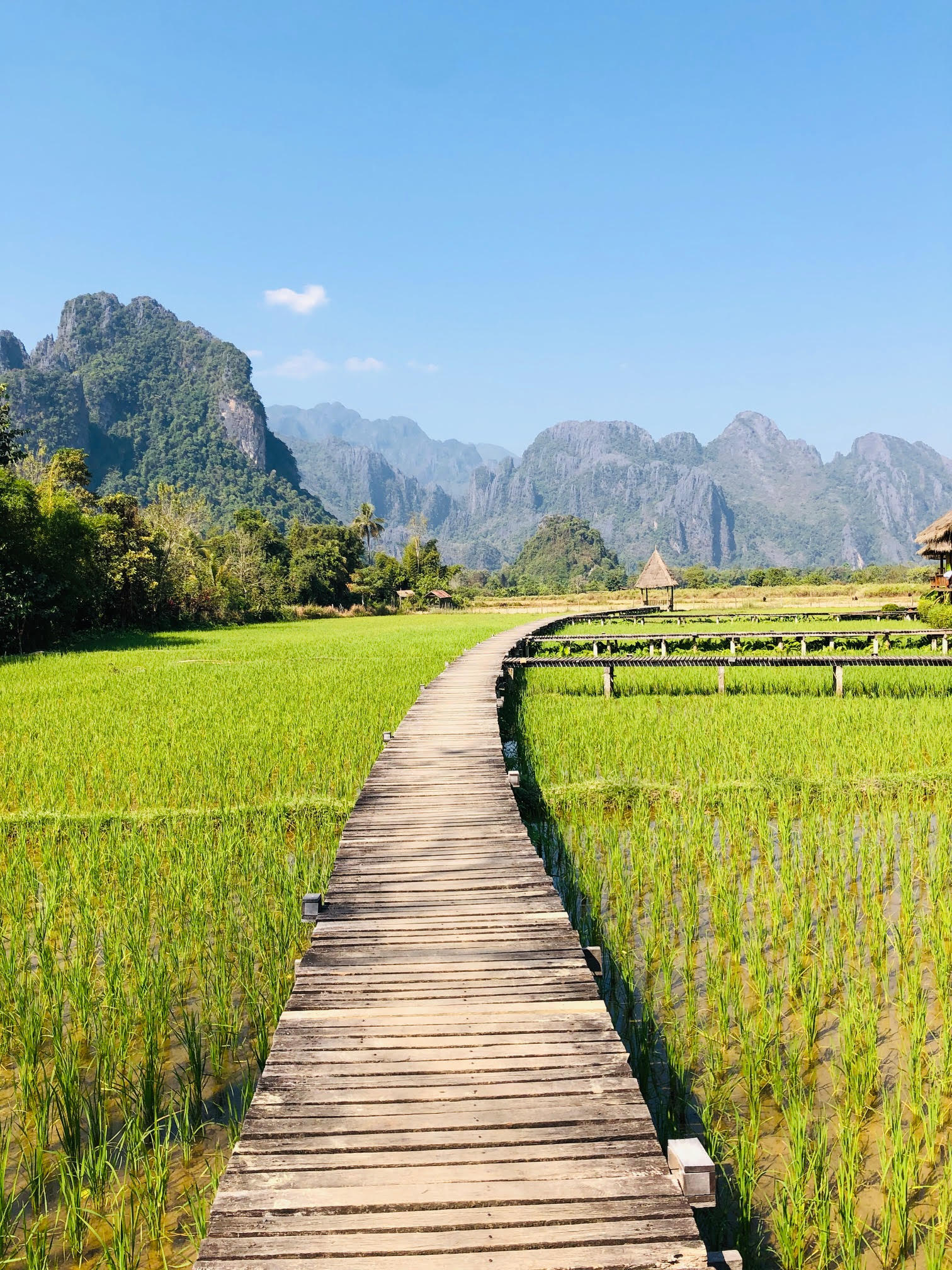
Paddy field in Vang Vieng

Vang Vieng has become a backpacker-oriented town, with the main street featuring guest houses, bars, restaurants, internet cafes, and tour agencies. Attractions of the town include inner tubing and kayaking on the Nam Song River, which, until 2012, was lined with bars selling Beer Lao and Lao-Lao, and equipped with rope swings, zip lines, swimming and diving into blue lagoon, and large decks for socializing.

Vang Vieng locals have organised themselves into a cooperative business association to sell tubing as an activity, in a system in which 1,555 participating households are divided into 10 village units, with each unit taking its turn on a ten-day rotation to rent inner-tubes to the tourists.

Thanongsi Sorangkoun, owner of an organic farm in Vang Vieng, says that tubing inadvertently began in 1999 when he bought a few rubber tubes for his farm volunteers to relax on along the river.

During the wet season, the river can be a series of rapids.

Other activities include trekking and rock climbing in the limestone mountains. There are also numerous caves, such as Tham Phu Kham half an hour north of Vang Vieng by tuk-tuk or the Tham Non and Tham Jang caves closer to Vang Vieng.

A market five kilometres north of town sells Lao textiles, household items, and foodstuffs. The town is on the main north–south highway, Route 13 from Luang Prabang to the capital, Vientiane. It is about eight hours by bus to Luang Prabang and four hours to Vientiane (152 km).

Just a short walk from town are many ethnic Lao, Kmou, and Hmong villages, while Vang Vieng Organic Farm is around 4 km north of the town in the village of Phoudindaeng. There are opportunities for community involvement such as teaching, while it is also possible to stay in a house made of mud bricks at the organic farm.

Wat Done Hor is the oldest of the five temples in Vang Vieng, built in 1903.

=== Impact of tourism ===
Due to the influx of backpackers, Vang Vieng locals have seen drastic changes in their community. In recent years, Vang Vieng has become a stop on the Southeast Asia backpacker circuit and the main street has many guest houses, bars, restaurants, internet cafes and tour agencies.

There are concerns that the town is in danger of losing its charm as it becomes full of tourists, mushroom shakes, and episodes of Friends, a US sitcom shown in many bars. The New Zealand Herald wrote, "If teenagers ruled the world, it might resemble Vang Vieng". Safety measures for the tubing have been described as "non-existent". Tubing combined with heavy drinking has resulted in tourist drownings. It was reported that 22 tourists died on the river in 2011.

The Lao government is planning to put more controls on the urban sprawl of Vang Vieng, while the Laos National Tourism Administration has "awareness programs" that ask tourists to "respect and strictly follow the rules, regulations, tradition and cultures of the Lao people", while also educating local people to maintain the Lao identity, way of life, tradition, and culture and not imitate tourist behaviour. Vang Vieng is known to have a problem with drugs, which are easily accessible to both tourists and local children.

Locals have said that tubing and tourism are destroying the town's culture and encouraging crime among children, while loud music destroys the area's tranquility. A report on the future of tourism in Vang Vieng found that many budget tubers were "oblivious to, or uncaring about, the types of social, economic and environmental impact they are associated with." A master plan for Vang Vieng noted that local grievances include pollution, inappropriate behaviour of tourists and environmental damage.

Brett Dakin, the author of Another Quiet American, a chronicle of two years in Laos working for the tourist authority, said, "Each time a young Australian woman strolls down the street in a bikini, a bearded American smokes a joint on a guesthouse terrace, or a group of Koreans tumbles drunkenly out of a restaurant, it saps a little more of the essence of a town like Vang Vieng."

=== Crime ===
As of June 2014, the US State Department said that although Laos generally had a low rate of violent crime, "some tourists have been robbed and sexually assaulted". Many restaurants in the Vang Vieng area offer menu items, particularly "pizzas", "shakes", or "teas" that may contain unknown substances or opiates. These products are often advertised as "happy" or "special" items. These unknown substances or opiates can be dangerous, causing serious illness or even death.

=== Tourist deaths and injuries ===
Vang Vieng's hospital recorded 27 tourist deaths in 2011 due to drowning or diving head first into rocks. Most fatalities occurred on the same bar-heavy stretch of river that's less than 1 km long. In a 2012 interview with The Guardian newspaper, a senior doctor at the Vang Vieng Hospital, Dr Chit, said the overall figure was higher because "many fatalities are taken straight to Vientiane". In early 2012, two Australian backpackers died within a month. Dr Chit said 5 to 10 backpackers a day arrive at the local hospital with injuries such as broken bones or infected gashes, or sickness caused by alcohol intoxication or other drugs. "There are no safety measures or supervision, no helmets," says Dr Chit. "We're not equipped to treat anything serious."

The Guardian reported that tourist deaths had brought a sense of bad karma for Laotian villagers living near the river. Today, local people avoid the river, once a part of everyday life for bathing, playing, fishing, and washing clothes. "We don't want to swim in the river any more," explains La Phengxayya, 25, a primary school teacher in Phoudindaeng, the village closest to the tubing area. "We believe there are evil spirits in the water because so many young foreigners have died."

In November 2024, six foreign tourists, including two Australian teenagers, two Danish women, a British lawyer, and an American tourist, died of suspected methanol poisoning after consuming contaminated alcohol at the Nana Backpackers Hostel in Vang Vieng. The tragedy, which also hospitalized several others, prompted Laotian authorities to detain eight hostel staff members and launch an investigation into the source of the contamination. Governments, including Australia, updated travel advisories, warning citizens about the dangers of consuming local alcohol in Southeast Asia. The incident significantly impacted Laos's tourism-dependent economy, as travelers canceled trips and raised concerns over safety standards in the country. Tourism, a critical sector for Laos, faced losses as international confidence waned, prompting calls for stricter regulations on alcohol production and improved enforcement to restore trust.

=== Government crackdown ===
In the third quarter of 2012, the Lao government carried out a crackdown in Vang Vieng, pulling down all the riverside bars. Tubing is still going on, but in a much more controlled fashion.

By October 2013, one climbing instructor was reported to have said that visitors were now spending more time participating in activities such as climbing, kayaking, and mountain biking. "Vang Vieng has come back to us again… it's like it used to be", he was quoted as saying.

Around the same time, the Bangkok Post reported that although the number of Westerners has dropped, visitors from Japan, China, and South Korea were on the rise, making up for the loss. The tourists from Asia did not favour cheap accommodation and preferred more upmarket places, the report added.

== See also ==
- Banana Pancake Trail
