= Architecture of Mongolia =

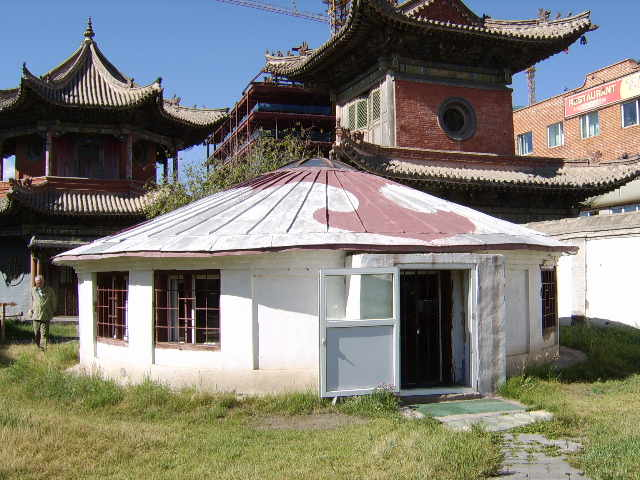
Early-20th-century yurt-shaped temple

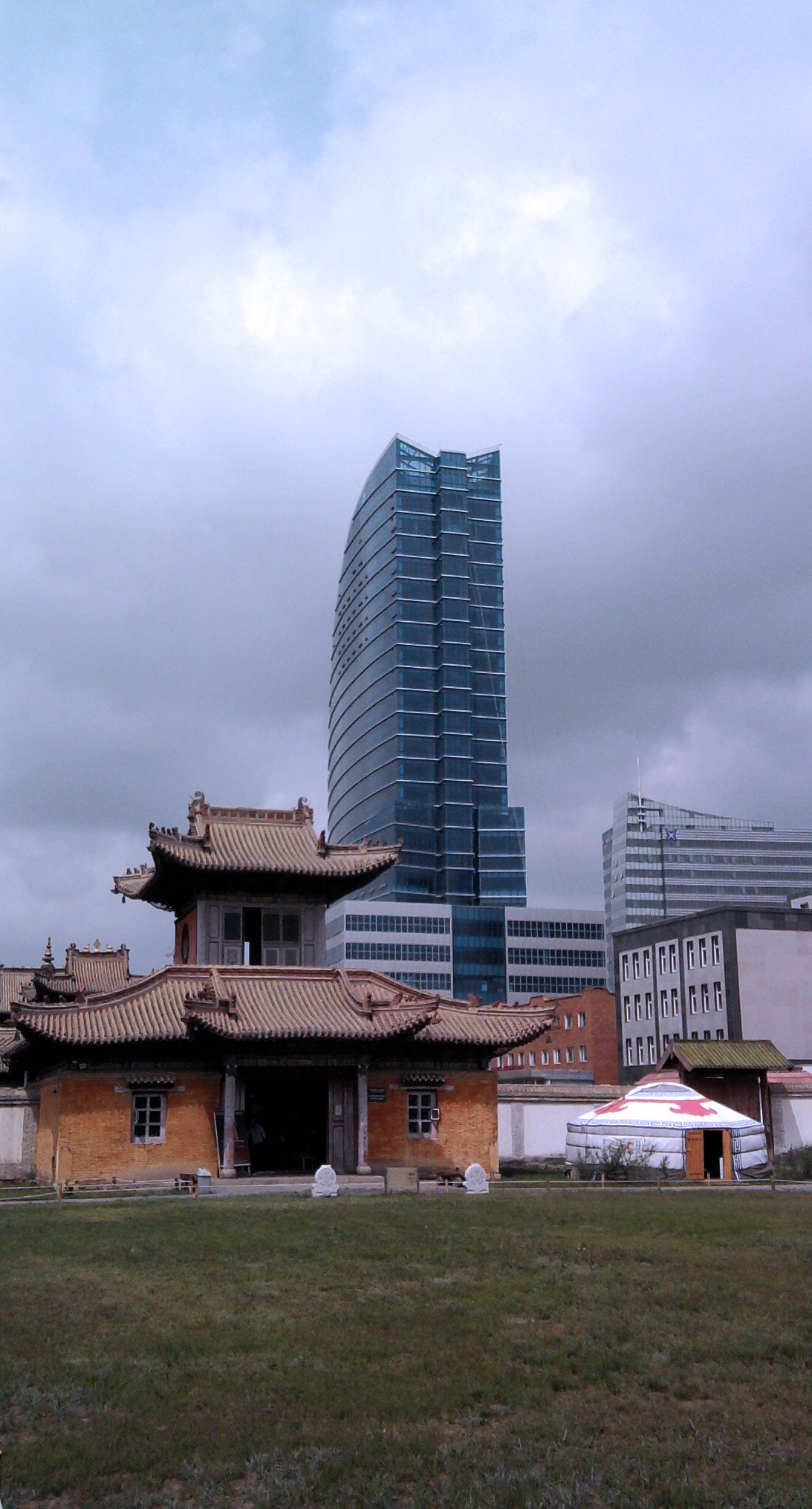
Architectural generations: yurt, temple and skyscraper

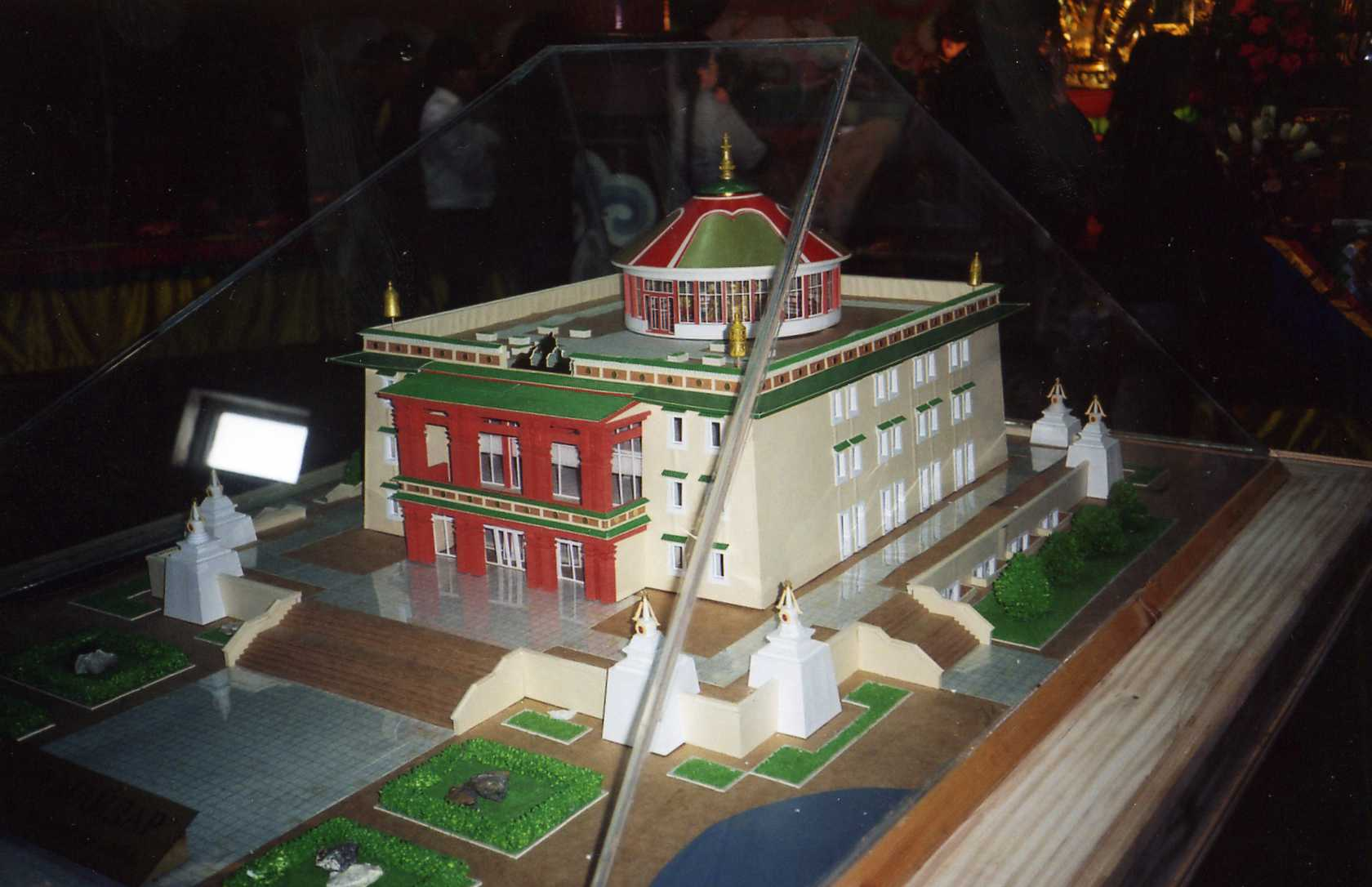
Model of the Maitreya Temple

The architecture of Mongolia is largely based on traditional dwellings, such as the yurt (Mongolian: гэр, ger) and the tent. During the 16th and 17th centuries, lamaseries were built throughout the country as temples which were later enlarged to accommodate a growing number of worshipers. Mongolian architects designed their temples with six and twelve angles and pyramidal roofs approximating the yurt's round shape. Further expansion led to a quadratic shape in the design of the temples, with roofs in the shape of pole marquees. Trellis walls, roof poles and layers of felt were eventually replaced by stone, brick beams and planks.

Mongolian artist and art historian N. Chultem identified three styles of traditional Mongolian architecture (Mongolian, Tibetan and Chinese), alone or in combination. Batu-Tsagaan (1654), designed by Zanabazar, was an early quadratic temple. The Dashchoilin Khiid monastery in Ulaanbaatar is an example of yurt-style architecture. The 18th century Lavrin Temple in the Erdene Zuu lamasery was built in the Tibetan tradition. The Choijin Lama Süm temple (1904), now a museum, is an example of a temple built in the Chinese tradition. The quadratic Tsogchin Temple, in Ulaanbaatar's Gandan monastery, combines Mongolian and Chinese traditions. The Maitreya Temple (demolished in 1938) was an example of Tibeto-Mongolian architecture. The Dashchoilin Khiid monastery has begun a project to restore this temple and the 24-metre (0.024 km) sculpture of Maitreya. Indian influences can also be seen in Mongolian architecture, especially in the design of Buddhist stupas.

== Ancient period ==
The Xiongnu confederation ruled present-day Mongolia from the third century BCE through the first century CE, living in portable, round tents on carts and round yurts. The Xiongnu aristocracy lived in small palaces, and their villages were protected by huge walls. S. I. Rudenko also mentions capital construction built of logs. Archaeological excavations indicate that the Xiongnu had towns; their chief city was Luut Hot (Dragon City).

Powerful states developed by Turkic tribes from the sixth through ninth centuries dominated the region. and there were several Turkic cities and towns in the Orkhon, Tuul and Selenga River valleys. The main city of the Turkic Khaganate was Balyklyk. The Uyghur Khaganate which succeeded the Turks centred on the city of Kara Balgasun, founded during the early eighth century. A portion of the 12-metre (39 ft)-high fortress wall with a watchtower has been preserved. A large craft trading district existed in the city, whose architecture was influenced by Sogdian and Chinese traditions.

Archaeological excavations uncovered traces of cities from the 10th- to 12th-century Kidan period. The most significant excavated city was Hatun Hot, founded in 944. Another significant Kidan city was Bars-Hot in the Kherlen River valley, which covered an area of 290 hectares (720 acres). The city was surrounded with mud walls which are now 4 metres (13 ft) thick and 1.5 to 2 metres (4 ft 11 in to 6 ft 7 in) high.

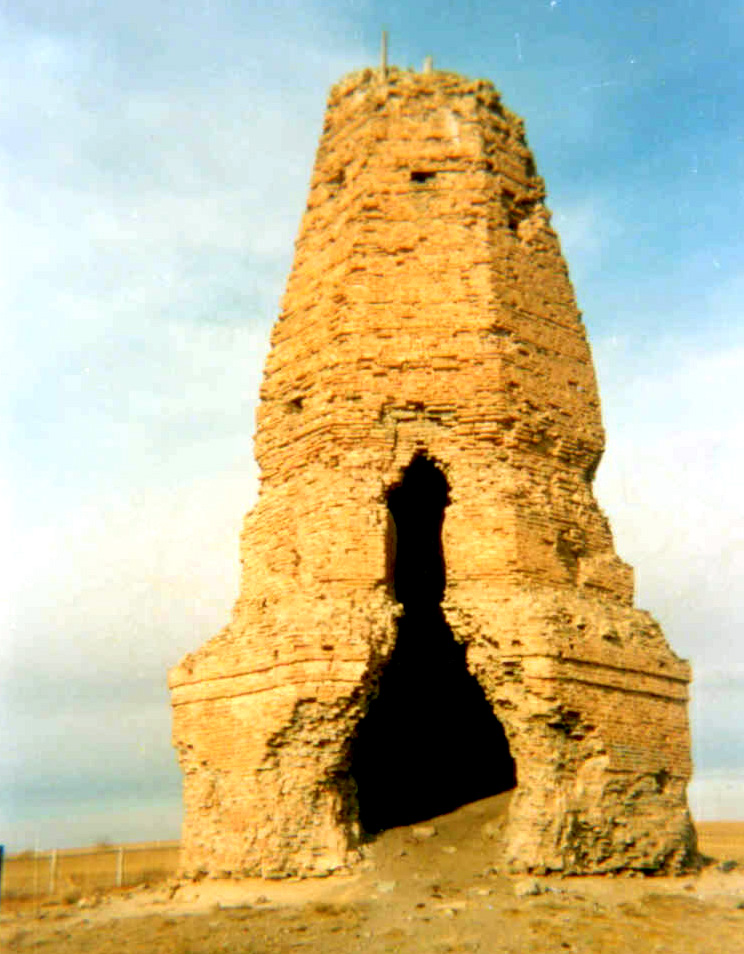
Stupa in the Kidan city of Bars-Hot

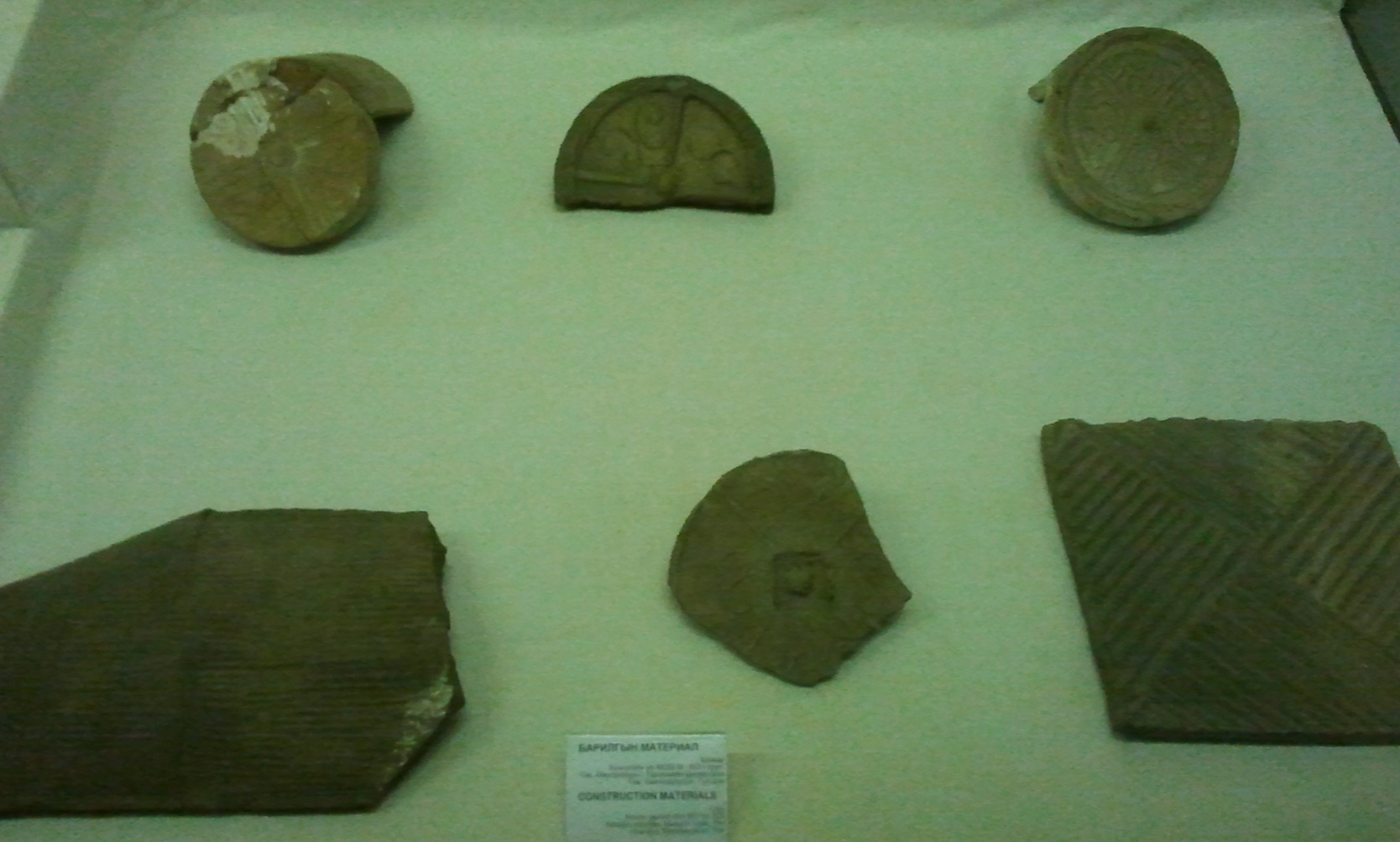
Construction materials from Xiongnu walled town of Tereljiin Dorvoljin (209 BC – 93 AD)

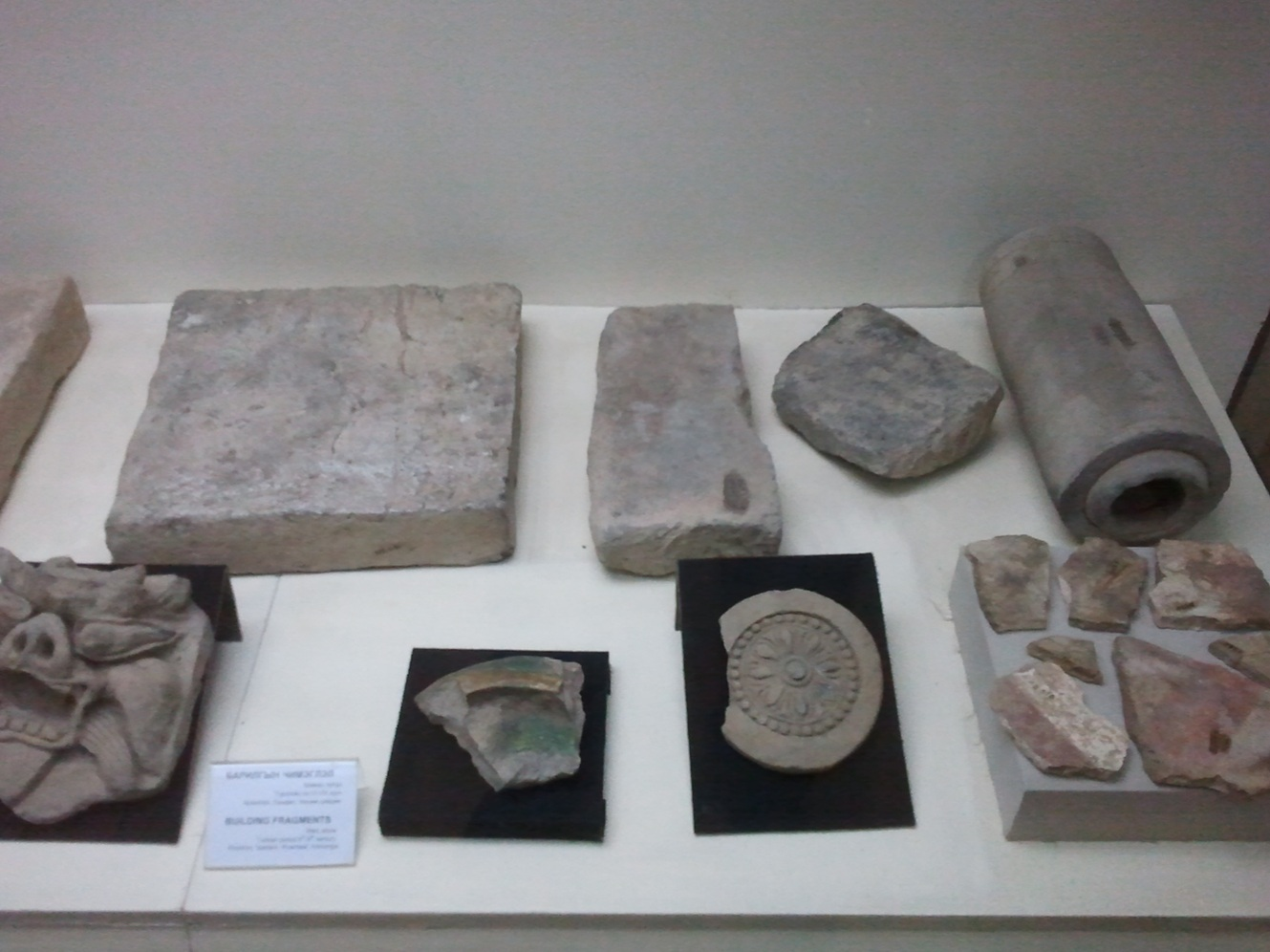
Gokturk Period (555–745) construction materials from Orkhon Valley memorial complex

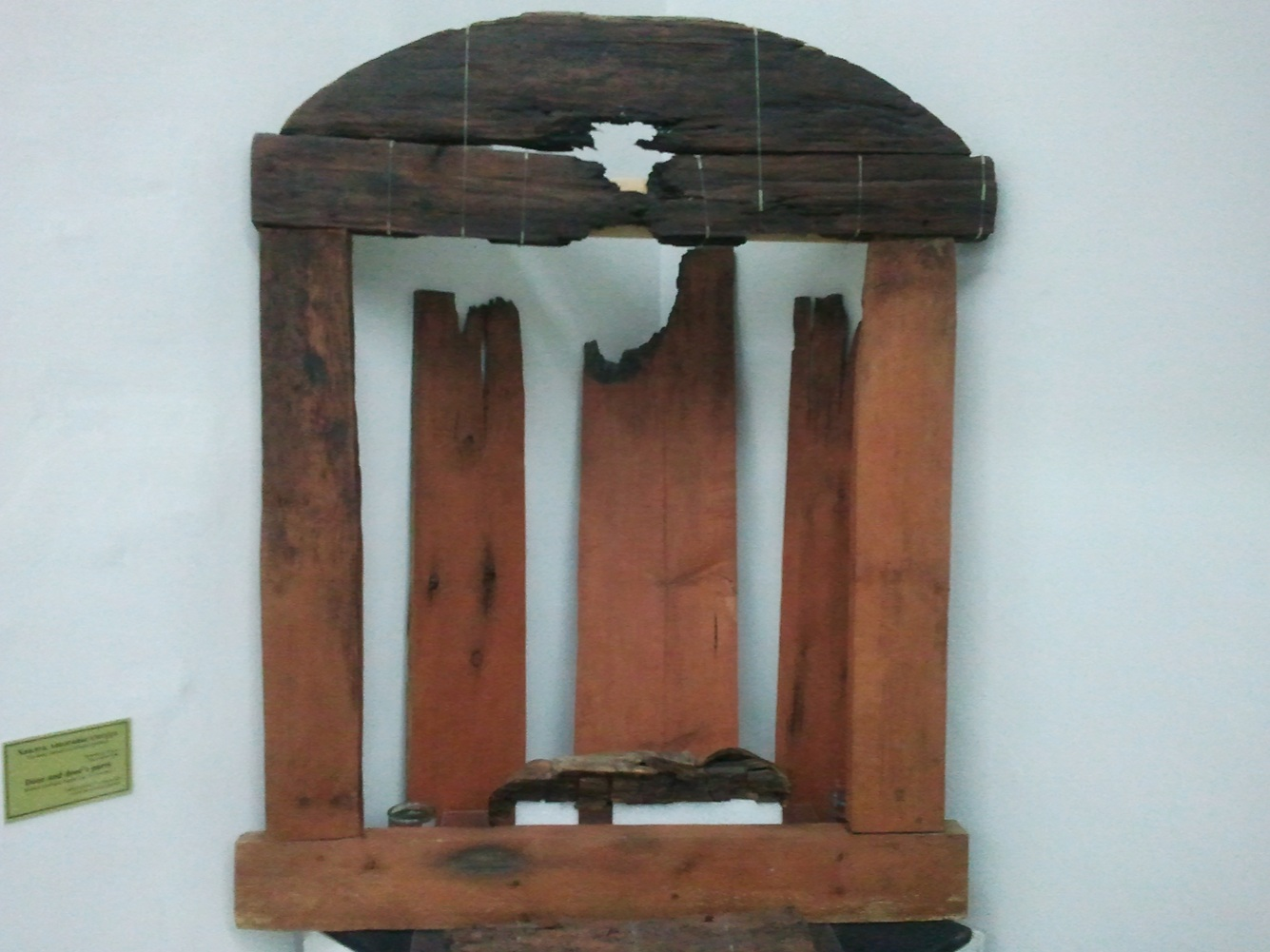
Mid-seventh-century Gokturk door parts from north-central memorial complex

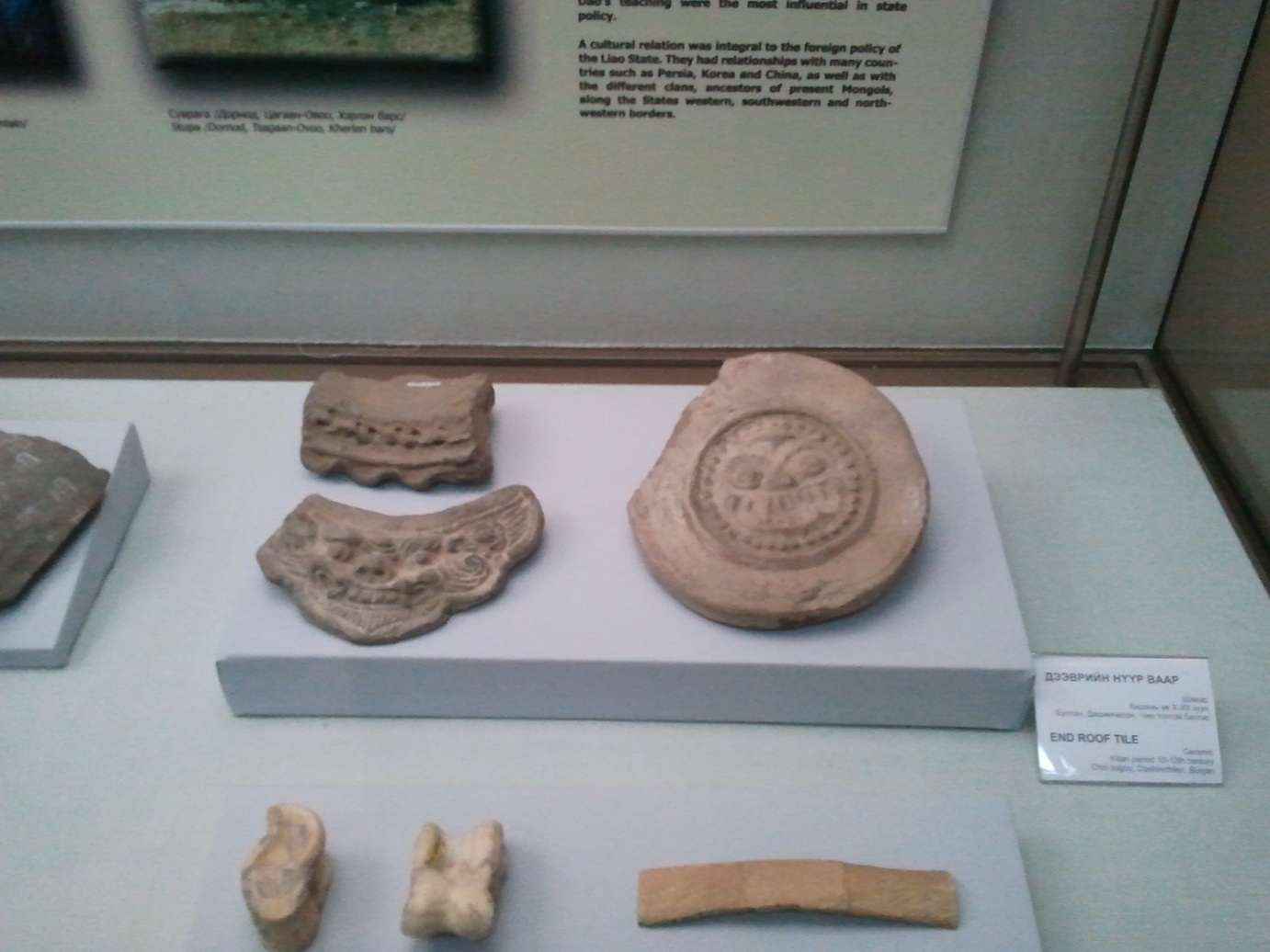
Construction materials from 10th-century Khitan city of Chin Tolgoi (Zhenzhou), Bulgan Province

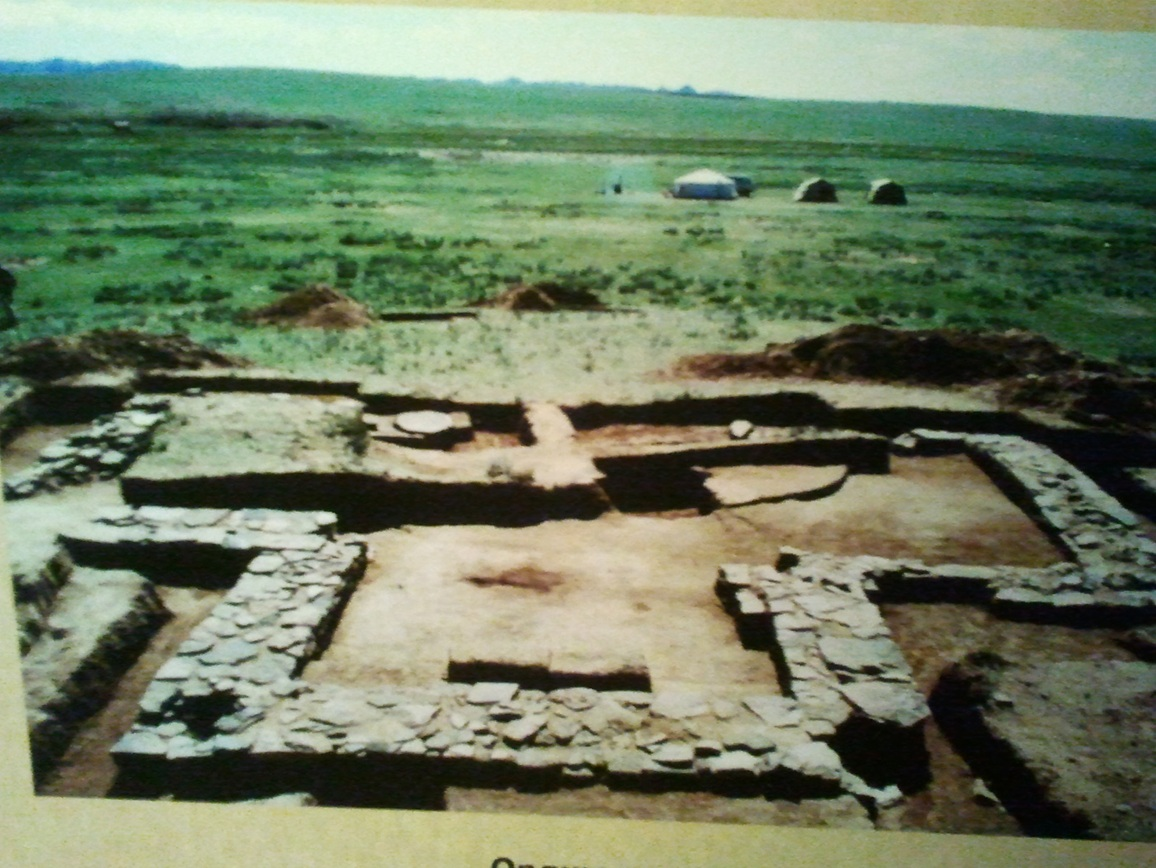
Ikh Aurug Ord (Great Aurag Palace), 12th-century Khamag Mongol capital

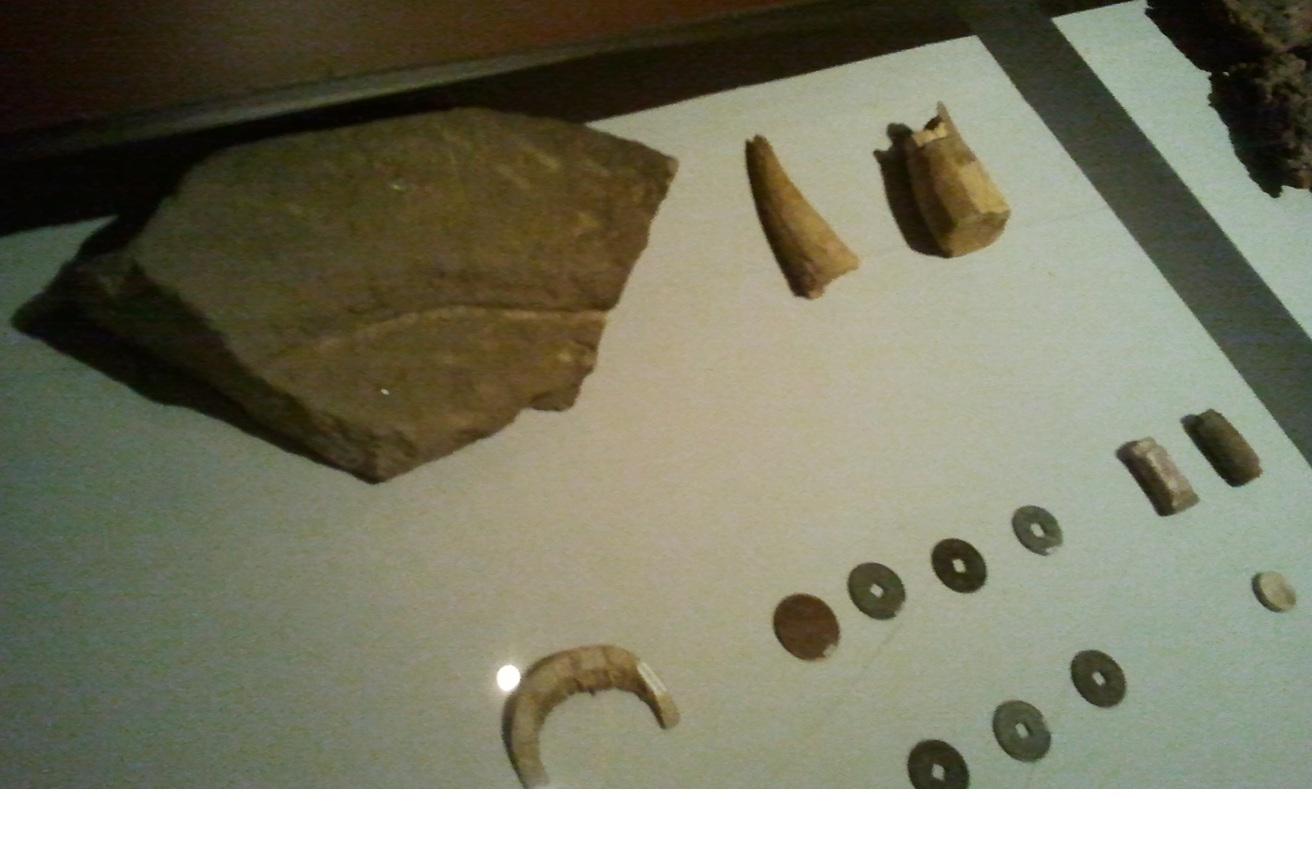
Ikh Aurag Ord artifacts

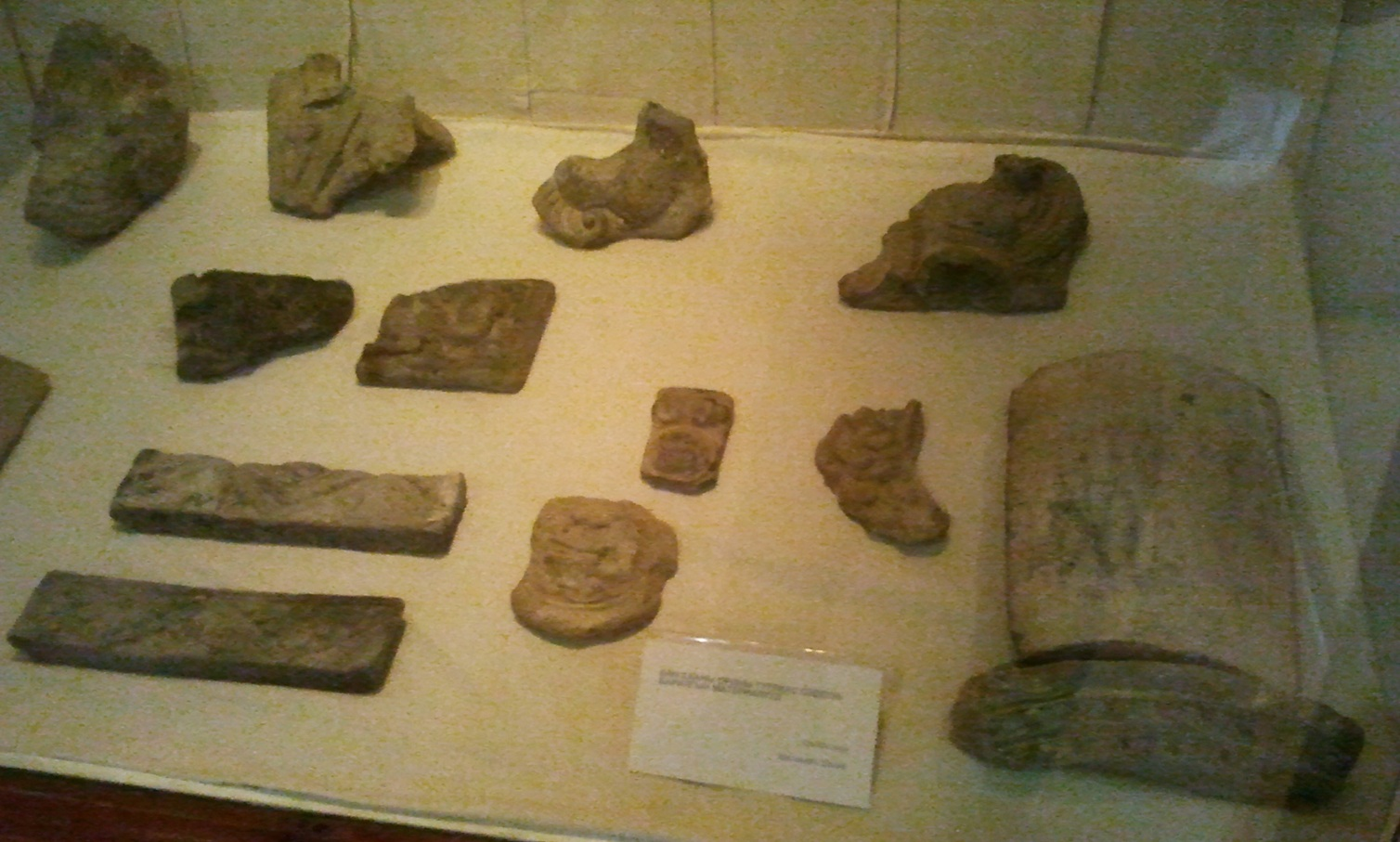
Artifacts from Wang Khan's 12th-century palace in Ulaanbaatar

== Yurts ==
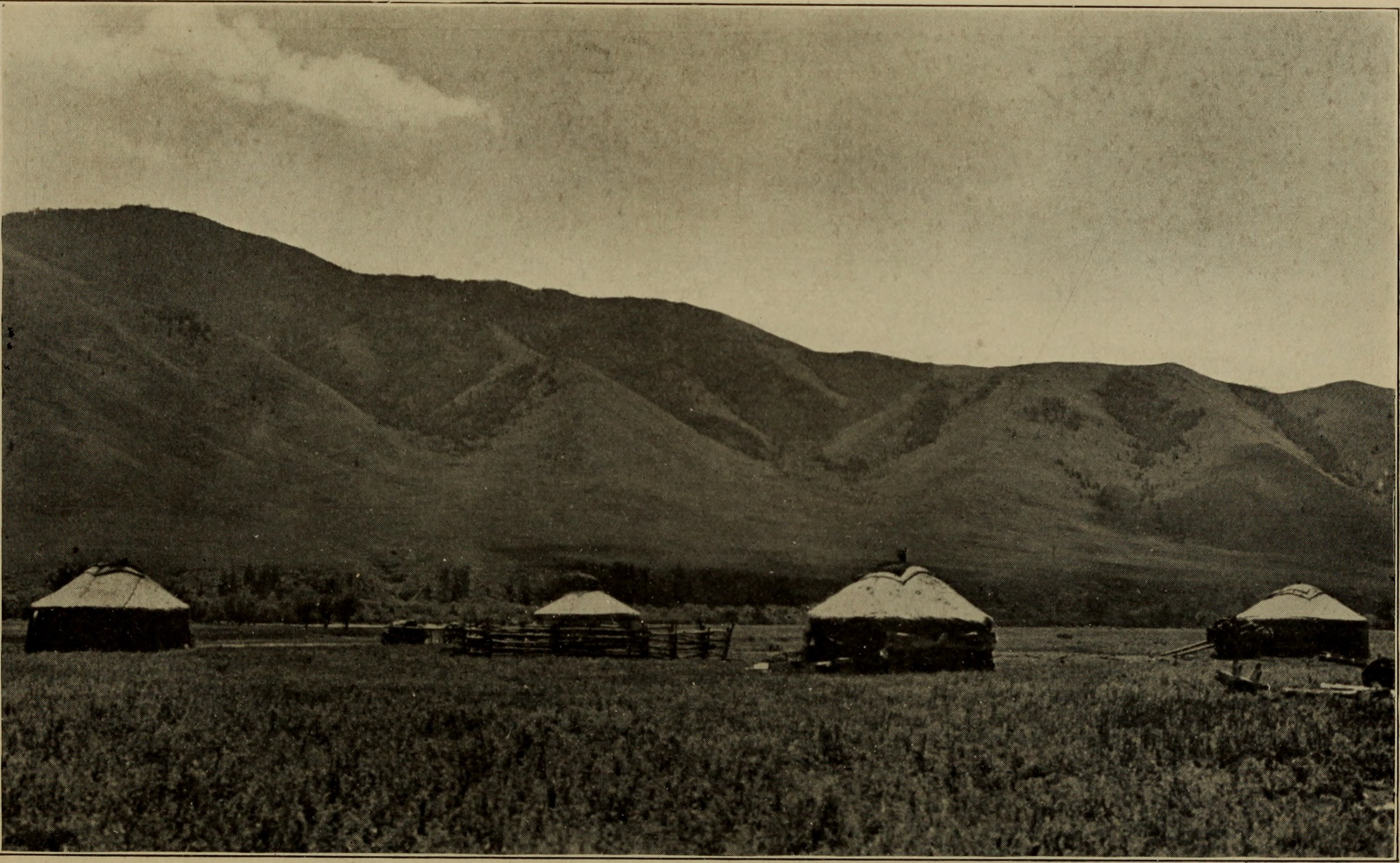
Some yurts in the steppe, 1921

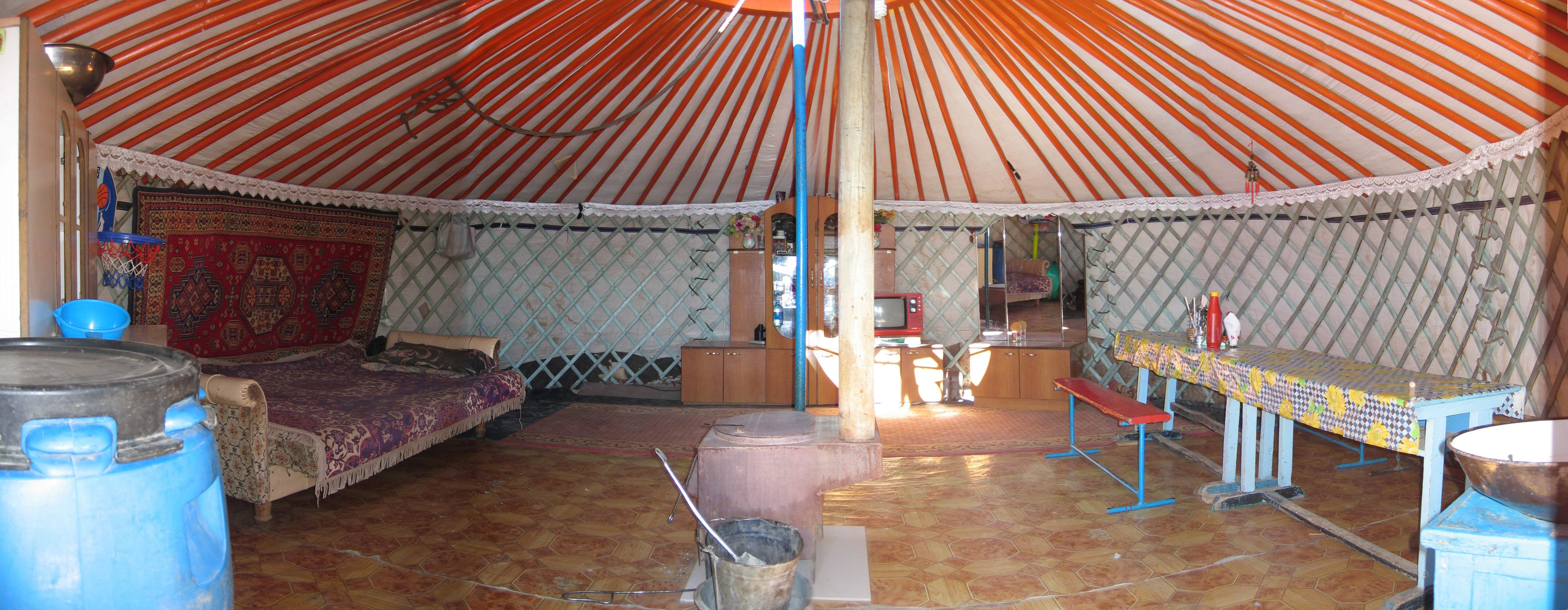
Inside a yurt

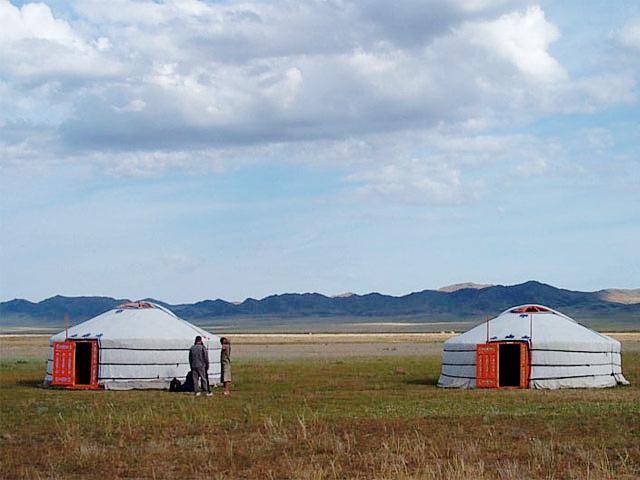
Yurts in the steppe

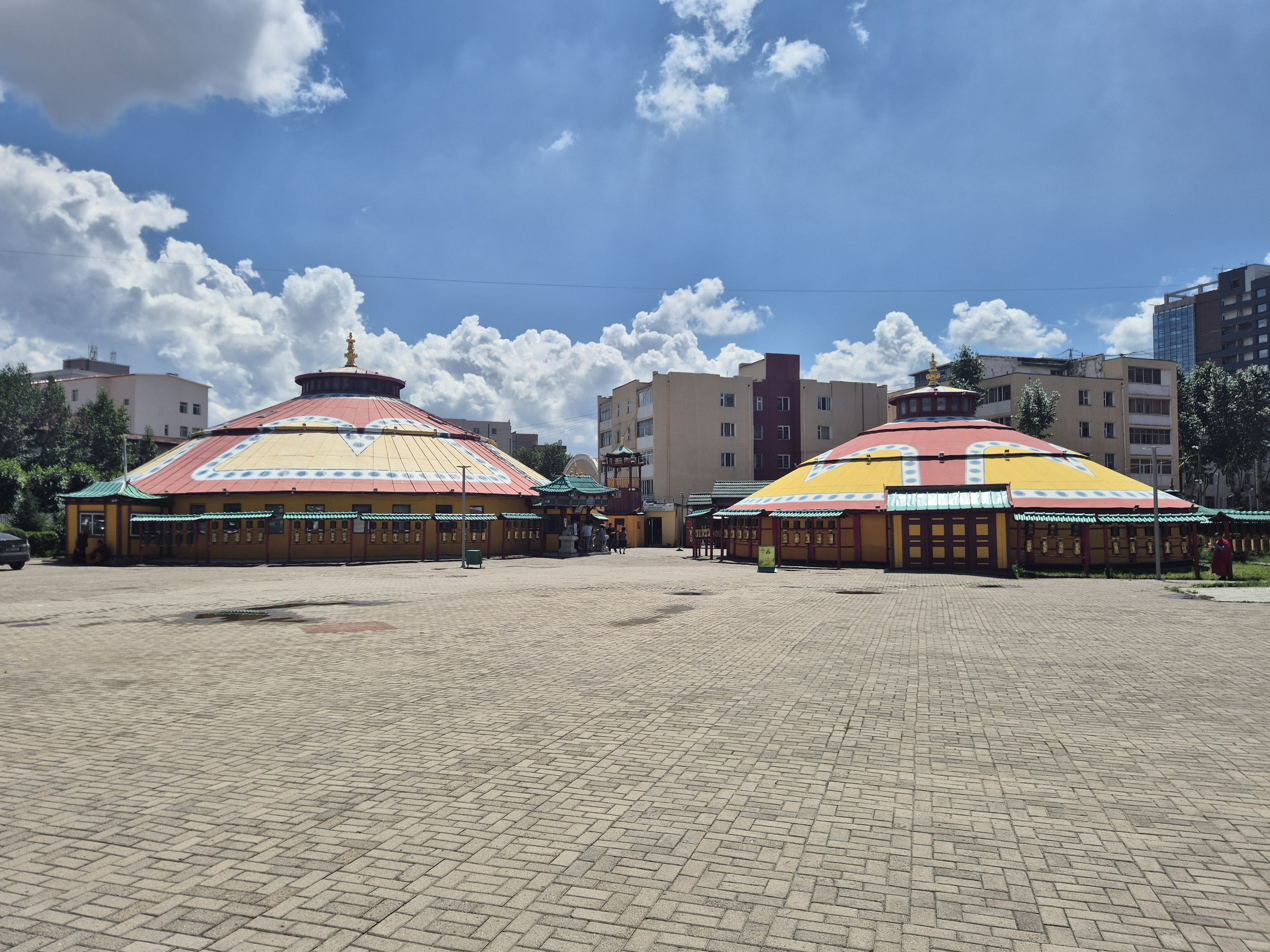
Temples at the Dashichoiling Monastery

The yurt, traditional dwelling of Mongolian nomads, is a circular structure supported by a collapsible wooden frame and covered with wool felt. In Mongolian, a yurt is known as a ger (гэр).

During the 12th and 13th centuries, ger-tereg (yurts on carts) were built for rulers. Large iron bushings for cartwheel axles were found during excavations at Karakorum. Axle length was over 6 metres (20 ft), and the cart was pulled by 22 oxen. Such ger-teregs are mentioned in the Secret History of the Mongols.

Medieval yurt camps were commonly arranged in a huree ('circle'), with the leader's yurt in the centre. Hurees were replaced by an ail (neighbourhood) arrangement in the 13th and 14th centuries during the Mongol Khanate and the end of internal strife. After the 15th-century disintegration of the khanate, the huree was the basic layout of monasteries (which were initially mobile). Another type of monastery layout, khiid (following the Tibetan arrangement) was used during the 16th and 17th centuries when Buddhism was re-introduced to the region. As huree monasteries and camps developed into towns and cities, their names retained the word huree (for example, Niislel Huree and Zasagtu Khaan-u Huree).

Roofs originally had steeper slopes, with a rim around the center opening to allow smoke from central, open fires to vent. During the 18th and 19th centuries, enclosed stoves with chimneys (zuuh) were introduced; this permitted a simpler design, with a lower silhouette. Another relatively-recent development is an additional layer of canvas for rain protection.

The organization and furnishings of the interior space mirror family roles and spiritual concepts. Each cardinal direction is significant, and the door always faces south. Herders use the sun's position in the crown of the yurt as a sundial.

Yurts have been used in Central Asia for thousands of years. In Mongolia they have influenced other architectural forms, particularly temples. Between 30 and 40 percent of the population live in yurts, many in city suburbs.

== Tents ==
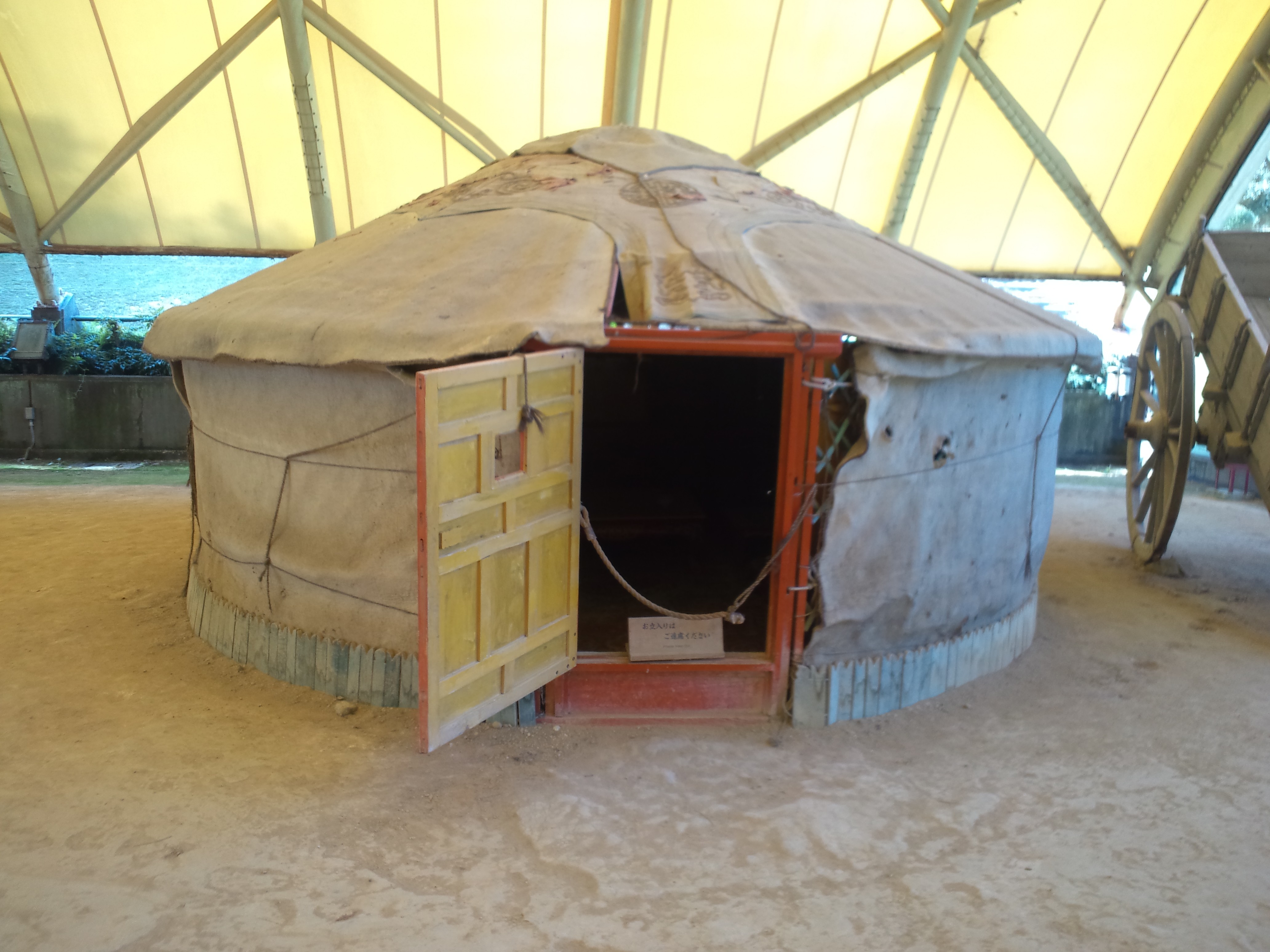
Recreation of a Mongolian yurt

Tents played a role in the development of Mongolian architecture, and these temporary shelters were frequently used under pastoral conditions. Tents were erected for Naadam, feasts and other gatherings.

Jodgor is a small tent, accommodating one or two people. Maihan is a larger tent for a group. Tsatsar is a fabric shade on vertical supports, replacing a wall. Tsachir is a large, rectangular tent with vertical fabric walls, and asar is a generic name for tsatsar and tsachir.

Giovanni da Pian del Carpine's book, Ystoria Mongalorum (History of the Mongols), reported that during the 1246 enthronement ceremony for Guyuk Khaan a tent with a capacity of 2,000 people was erected on the Tamir River. The marquee was supported by pillars decorated with gold leaves, and the internal side of the walls were covered with canopy. Later designs of many temples were based on tsachir.

== Imperial period ==
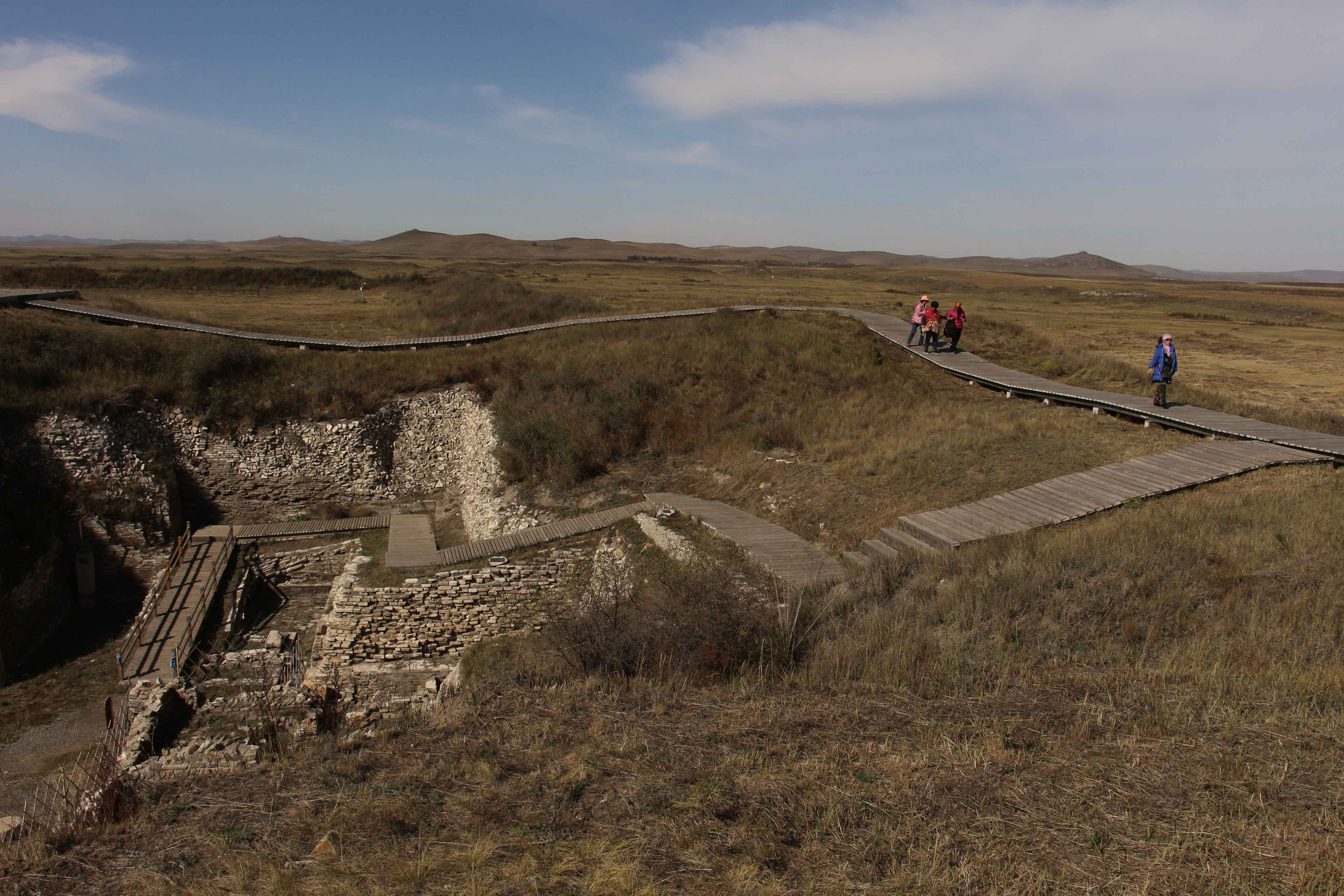
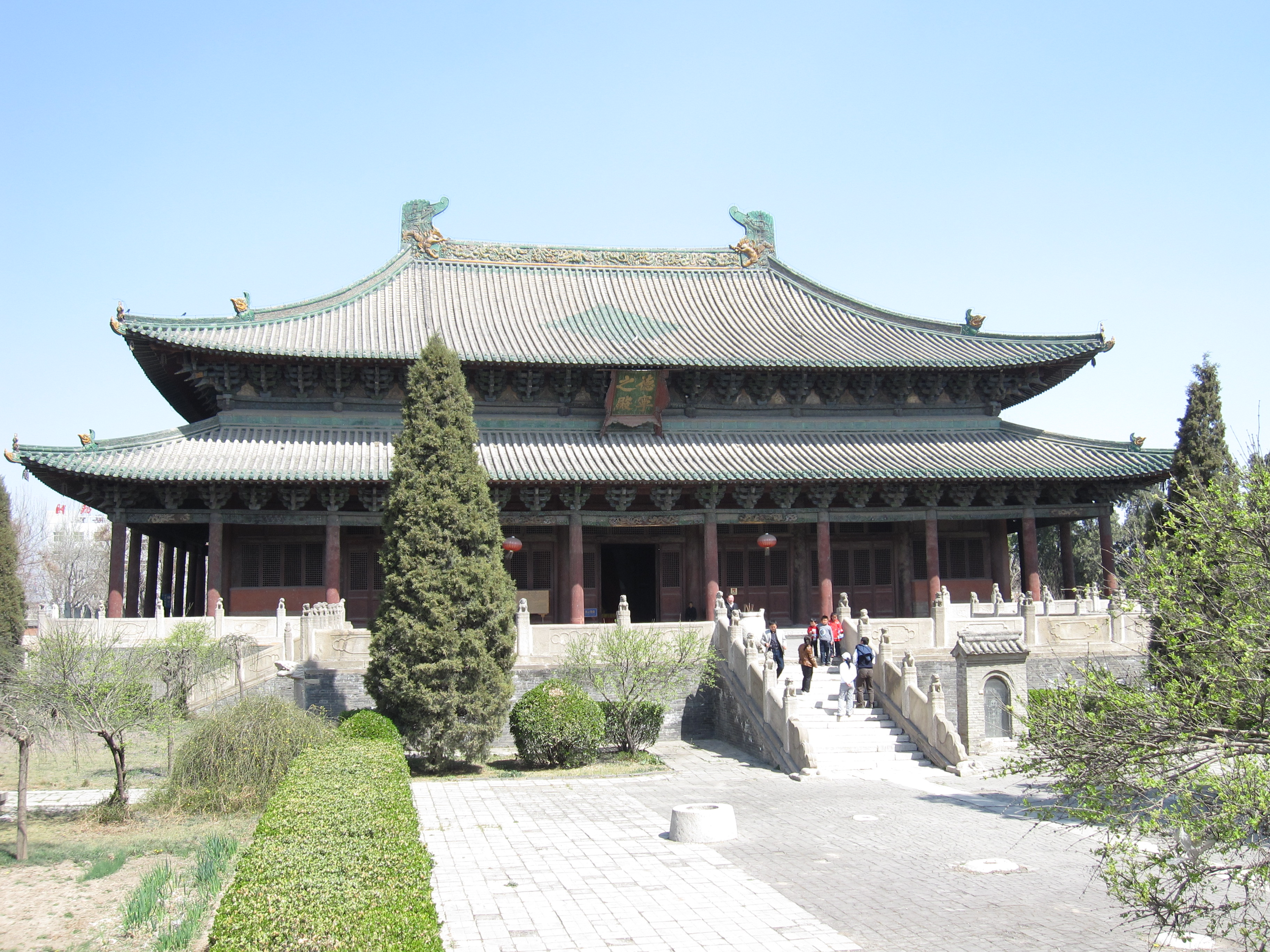
Karakorum was initially the capital of the Mongol Empire, later moved to Shangdu (above) and finally to Dadu. The Dening Hall (below) built by the Yuan closely resembles the lost palace architecture of Dadu (Beijing) and Karakorum.

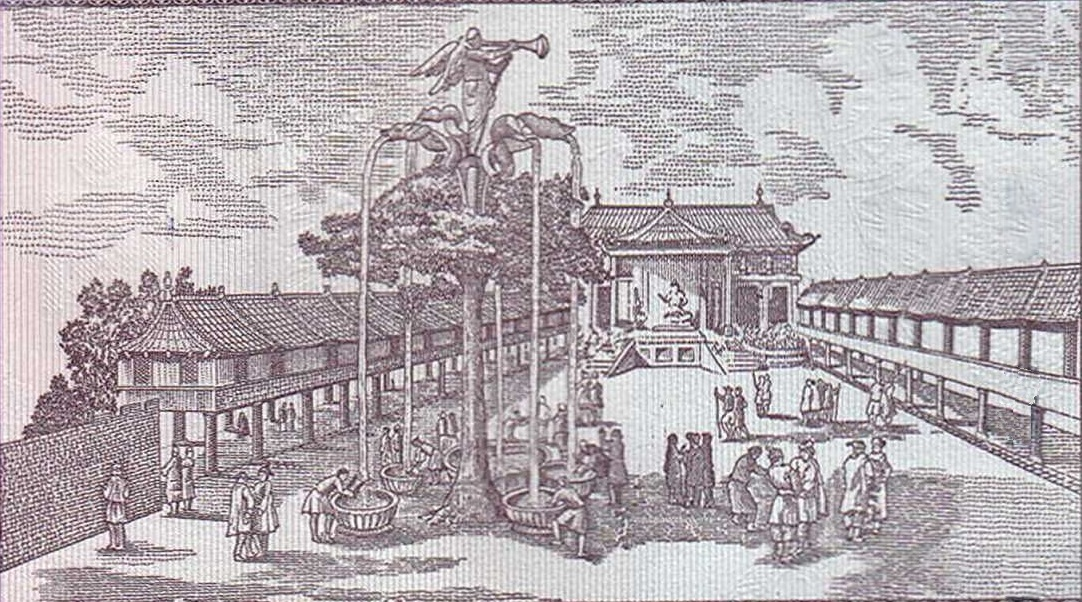
18th-century drawing of Silver Tree fountain in front of Tumen Amugulang Palace

The remains of the Mongol Empire capital, Karakorum, were first rediscovered and studied by S. V. Kiselev. Karakorum, in the Orkhon River valley, was founded by Genghis Khan in 1220 as a military centre; in 15 years, it also became an administrative and cultural centre of the empire.

The Tumen Amugulang palace (palace of the Great Khan) was in the centre of the city. Based on the records of William of Rubruck, most scholars believe that a silver, tree-shaped fountain stood in front of the palace; however, according to others the fountain was inside the palace. According to Rubruck, four silver lions stood at the foot of the Silver Tree and fermented mare's milk (airag, a favourite Mongol drink) flowed from their mouths. Four golden serpents twined around the tree.

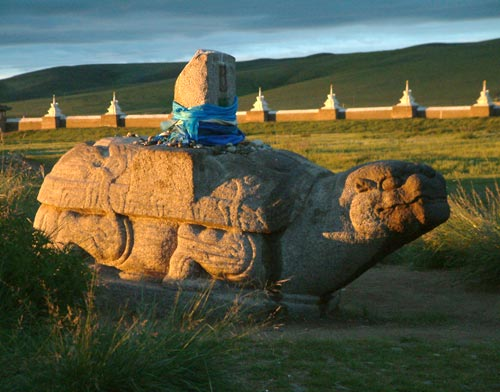
Tortoise (bixi) at Karakorum

Wine ran from the mouth of one serpent, airag from the second serpent, mead from the third and rice wine from the fourth. At the top of the tree, an angel blew a bugle. The tree's branches, leaves and fruits were made of silver. It was designed by a captive sculptor, William of Paris. The khan sat on a throne in the north end of the yard, in front of the palace. Excavations partially confirmed the description, and the buildings were heated by smoke pipes installed under the floors. The khan's palace was built on a .2475-hectare (0.612-acre) platform.

Genghis Khan's son, Ögedei, ordered his brothers, sons and other princes to build palaces in Karakorum. The city contained Buddhist temples, Christian churches and Muslim mosques. There were sculptures of tortoises at each gate of the four-sided, walled city. Steles on the tortoises' backs were topped with beacons for travellers in the steppe. Karakorum's construction was supervised by Otchigin, youngest brother of Genghis Khan.

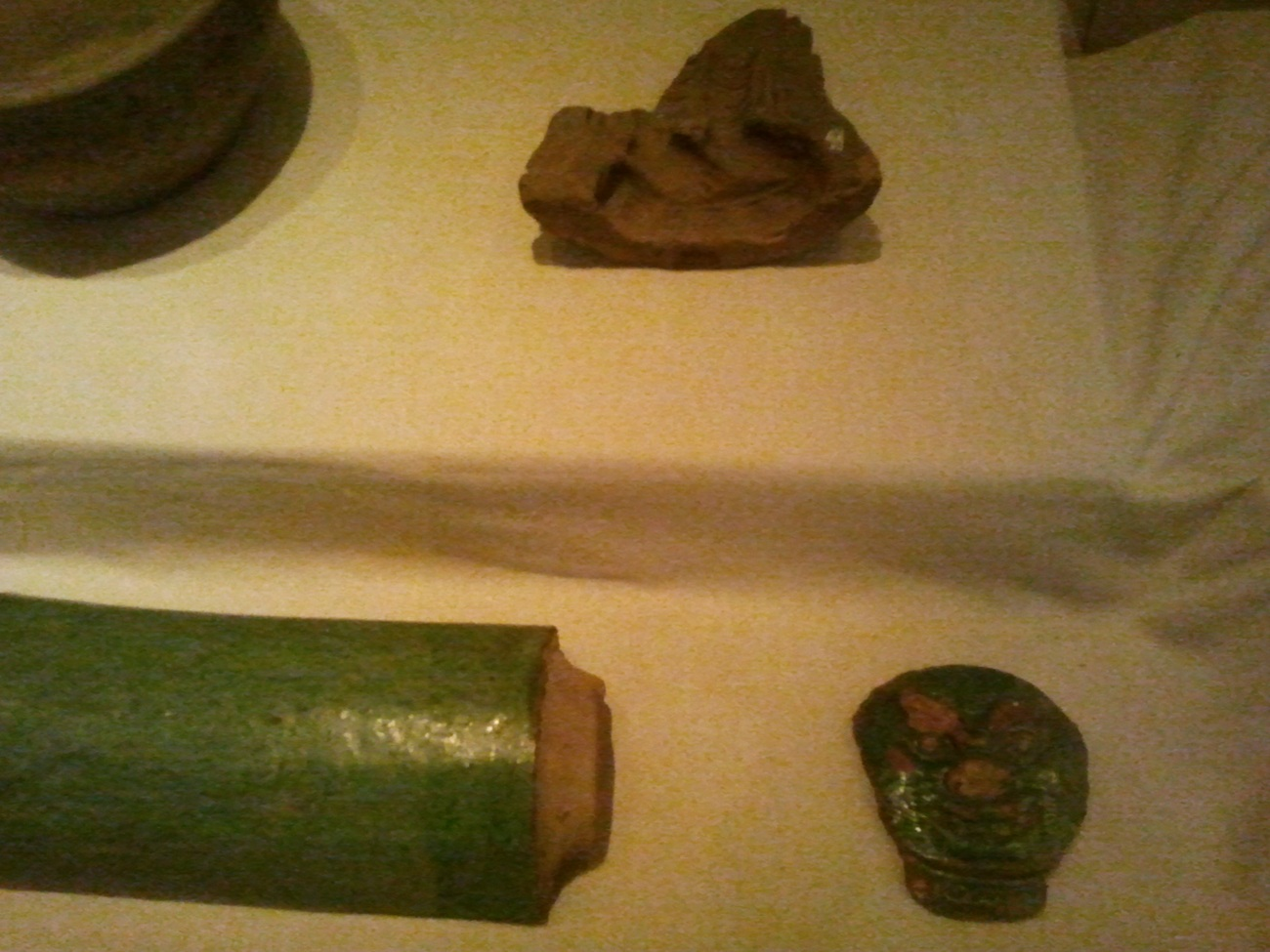
Artifacts from the 13th-century palace in Karakorum

Other cities and palaces existed throughout Mongolia during the 13th and 14th centuries. Best-studied are the ruins of Palace Aurug, near Kerulen, and the cities of Hirhira and Kondui in the trans-Baikal region. The latter two indicate that cities developed not only around the khans' palaces but also around the homes of other nobility; Hirhira developed around the residence of Juchi-Khasar. The Mongolian nobility, dissatisfied with temporary residences, began to build luxurious palaces. The palace in Hirhira was inside a citadel. The palace in Kondui was built on a platform surrounded by double-tiered terraces, pavilions and pools. The archeological excavations revealed evidence of burning; all three cities fell during the late 14th century, when the Chinese army raided the region and looted the cities. Karakorum, destroyed in 1380, never restored its previous glory. Wars waged by China continued from 1372 to 1422, halting Mongolia's cultural progress during the imperial period. The region experienced a dark age until the second half of the 16th century, when a renaissance began.

== Renaissance ==
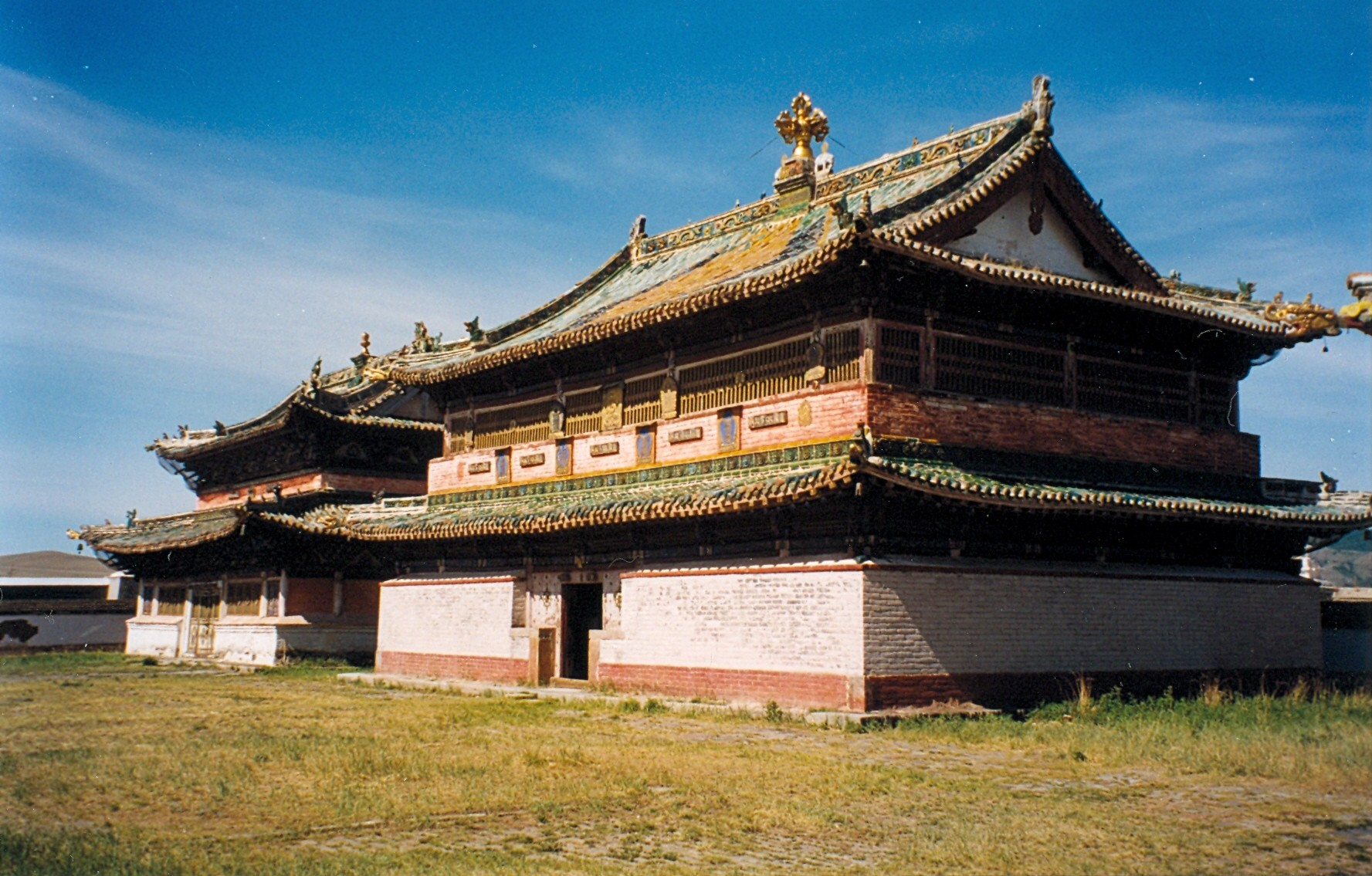
Zuu Temple at Erdene Zuu monastery

After two centuries of cultural decline, Mongolia began a renaissance during the second half of the 16th century. This was a period of relative peace, free of foreign aggression, and the Gelug school of Buddhism was introduced. Altan Khan of Tumet founded the city of Hohhot in 1575 as a political and cultural centre. Among the first Buddhist monasteries in Mongolia during this period was temple Thegchen Chonchor Ling in Khökh Nuur, built by Altan Khan to commemorate his 1577 meeting with third Dalai Lama Sonam Gyatso. Many temples were built in Hohhot during the period including Dazhao and Xilituzhao Temples.

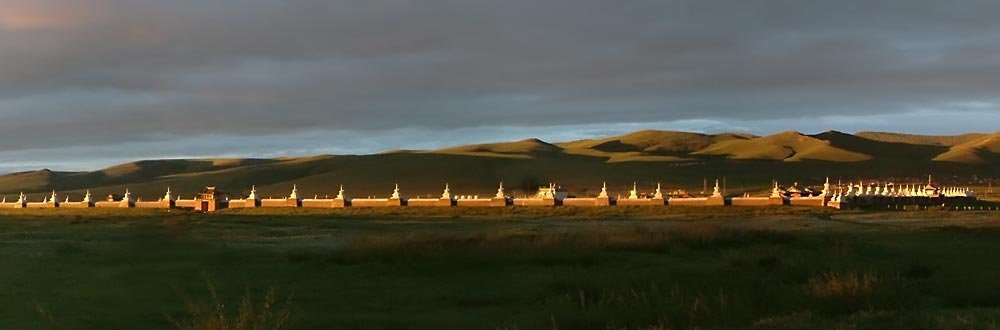
Erdene Zuu walls

In Khalkha, Abatai Khan founded the Erdene Zuu monastery in 1585 near the site of Karakorum. Although these first temples were designed in the Chinese style, Mongolian architecture developed a unique style with Tibetan and Indian influences.

The Mongolian style began with mobile temples. As the people became more sedentary, the temples evolved into multi-angular and quadratic structures. The roof, supported by pillars and walls, served also as the ceiling.

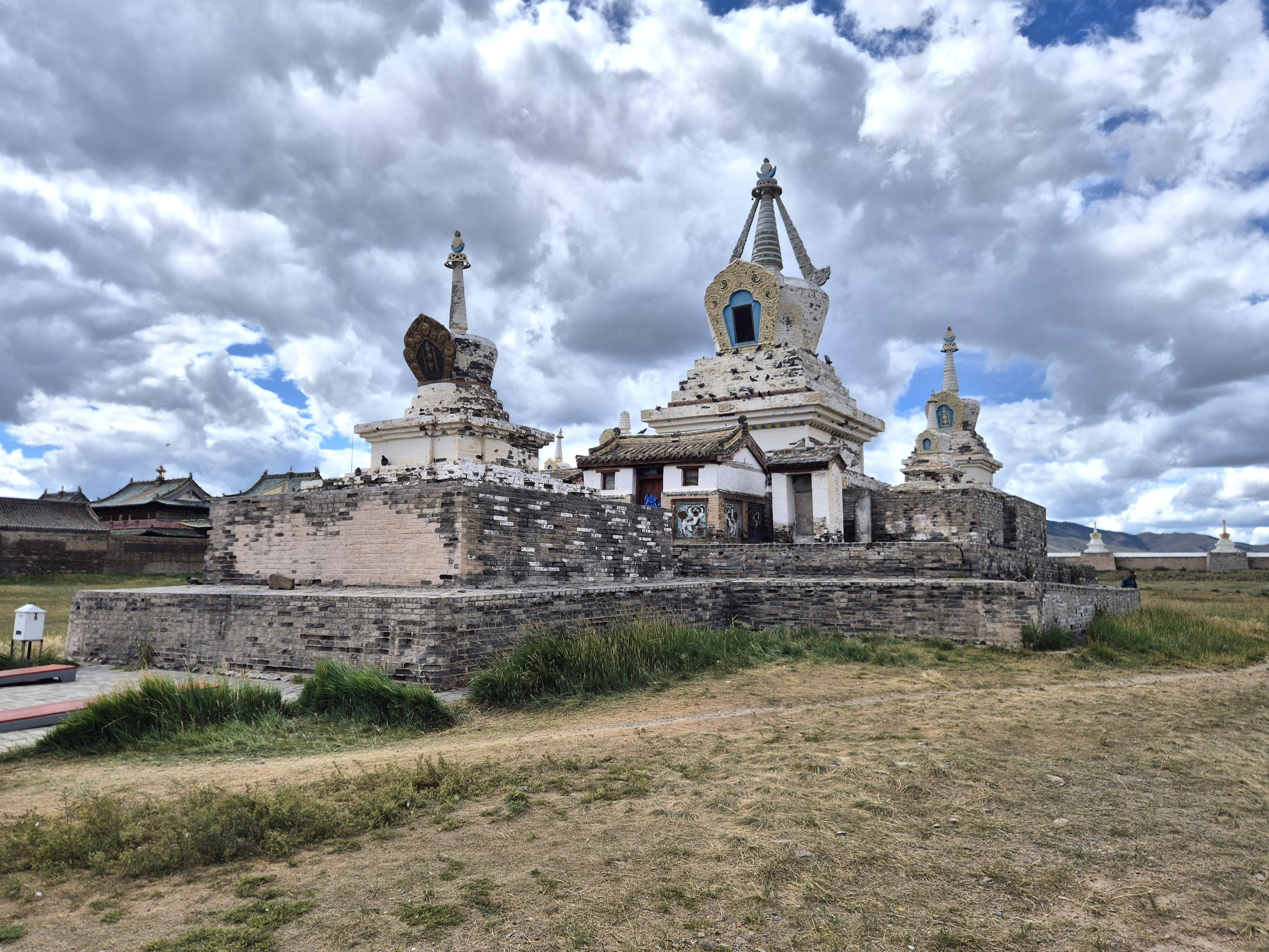
Stupa at Erdene Zuu monastery

Zanabazar, the first Bogd Gegeen of the Khalkha Mongols, designed many temples and monasteries in traditional Mongolian style and supervised their construction. He merged Oriental architecture with the designs of Mongolian yurts and marquees. Zanabazar's Batu-Tsagaan Tsogchin temple in Ulaanbaatar was a prototype of the Mongolian architectural style. A large, marquee-shaped structure, its four central columns support the roof. There are 12 columns in the middle row; those in the outer row are slightly taller, and the total number of columns is 108. The temple, designed for expansion, was originally 42 by 42 metres (138 ft × 138 ft) and later expanded to 51 by 51 metres (167 ft × 167 ft).

The Indian style was most prominent in stupa design. Among the best-known stupas are Ikh Tamir, Altan Suburgan of Erdene Zuu, Jiran Khashir of Gandang and the mausoleums of Abatai Khan and Tüsheetu Khan Gombodorji. The Khögnö Tarni (1600), Zaya-iin Khüree (1616), Baruun Khüree (1647) and Zaya-iin Khiid (1654) monasteries were built during this period.

== Post-renaissance ==
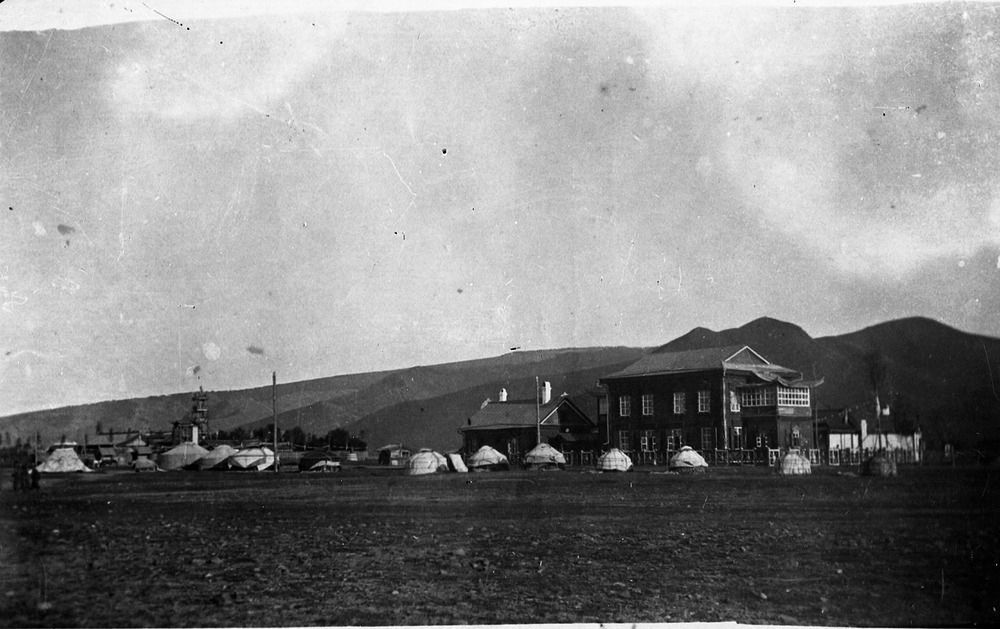
Niislel Khüree, also known as Urga in the 1900s

Construction of temples in the renaissance tradition continued into the 18th, 19th and early 20th centuries. Ishbaljir (1709–1788) compared building proportions to the proportions of the human body in Exquisite Flower Beads, and Agvaanhaidav (1779–1838) described the process of building a Maitreya temple. Agvaanceren (1785–1849) wrote Aahar shaahar (Building and Repairing Temples). Translations of the Kangyur were also used by Mongolian architects.

The Züün Khüree (1711), Amarbayasgalant (1727) and Manjusri Hiid (1733) monasteries were built during this period. The mobile monastery Ihe Huree, founded for Zanabazar, settled at its present Ulaanbaatar location in 1779. The wall around Erdene Yuu monastery, with 108 stupas, began construction in 1734.

The temple of the boddhisattva Avalokiteshvara was built from 1911 to 1913 as a symbol of the new, independent Bogdo Khanate of Mongolia. The statue of the boddhisattva, believed to opens the eyes of wisdom in sentient beings, symbolised the Mongolian people's step into modern civilisation.

In the beginning of the 20th century, there were about 800 monasteries throughout the country. The experimental practice of combining traditional Asian architecture with Russian architecture was explored. The Bogd Khan had his winter palace built as a Russian horomy. Another example of the combining of Asian and Russian styles is the residence of Khanddorji Wang, a leader of the Mongolian Revolution of 1911. The body of the building is designed as a Russian house, and the top was designed in the Asian style. One of the first European-style buildings in Mongolia is the 2-storey building housing Zanabazar Museum of Fine Arts, built as a trade centre in 1905.

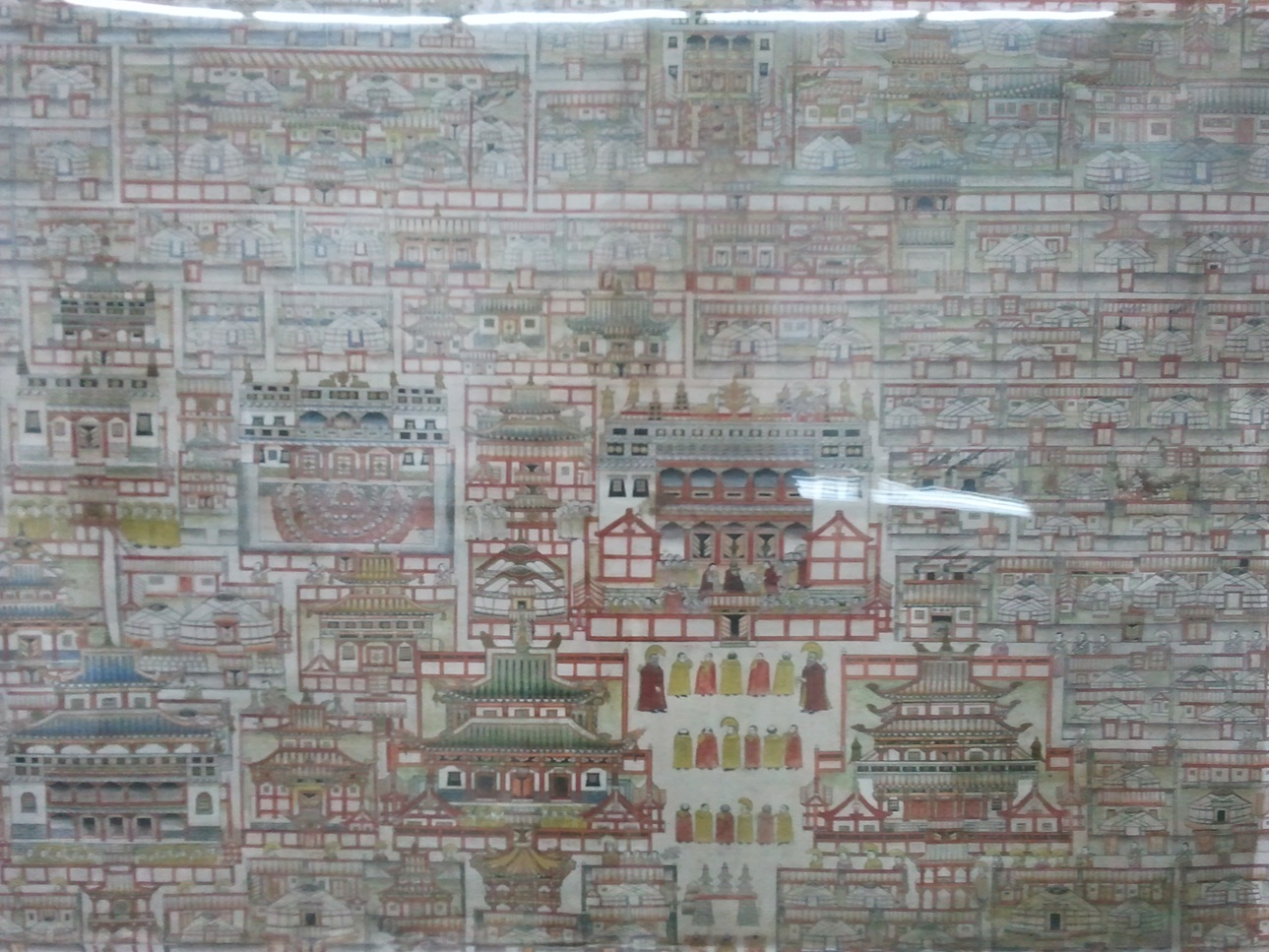
19th-century painting of the Monastery of Sain Noyon Khan, with different styles of traditional architecture

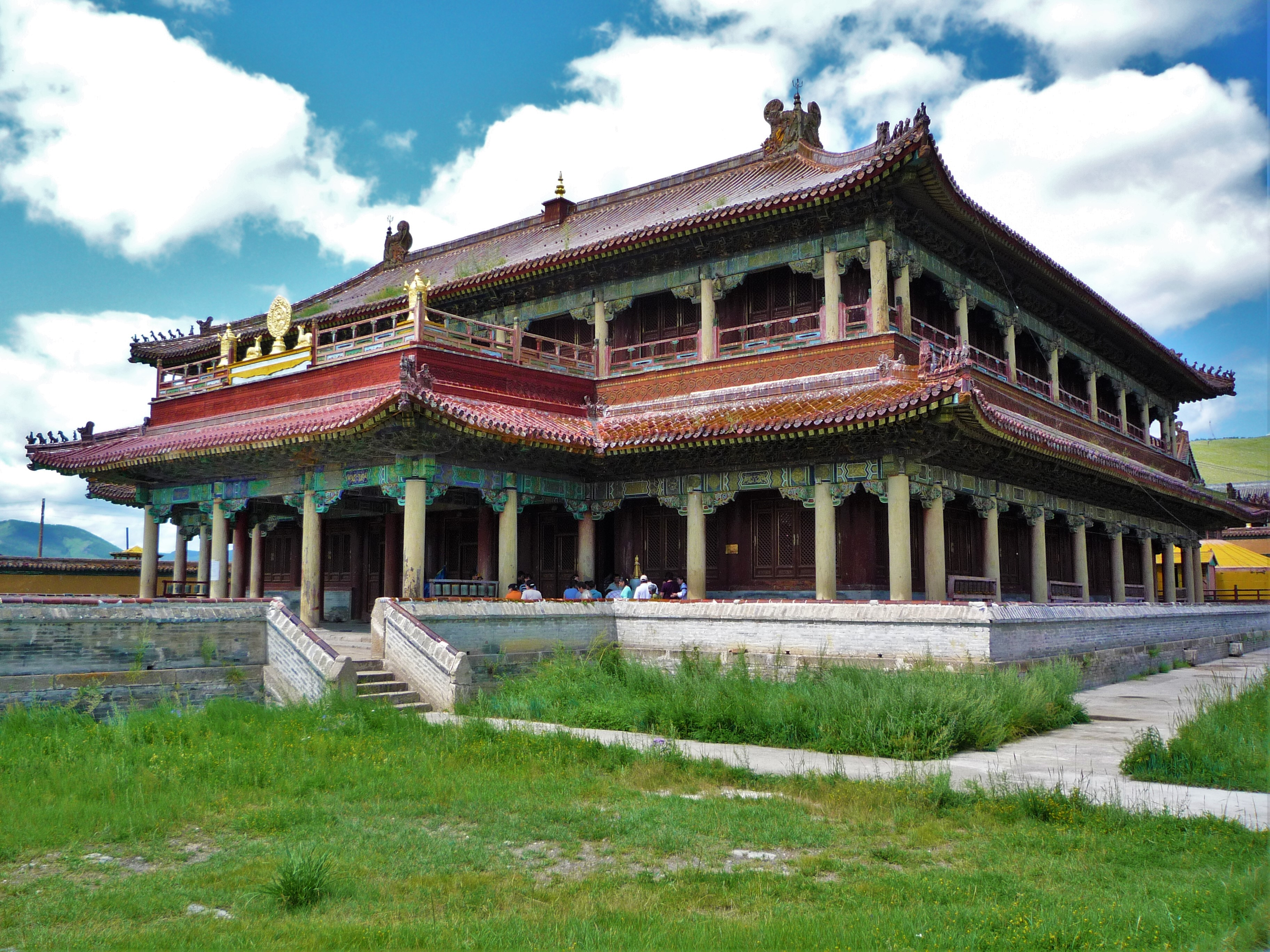
Temple at Amarbayasgalant monastery

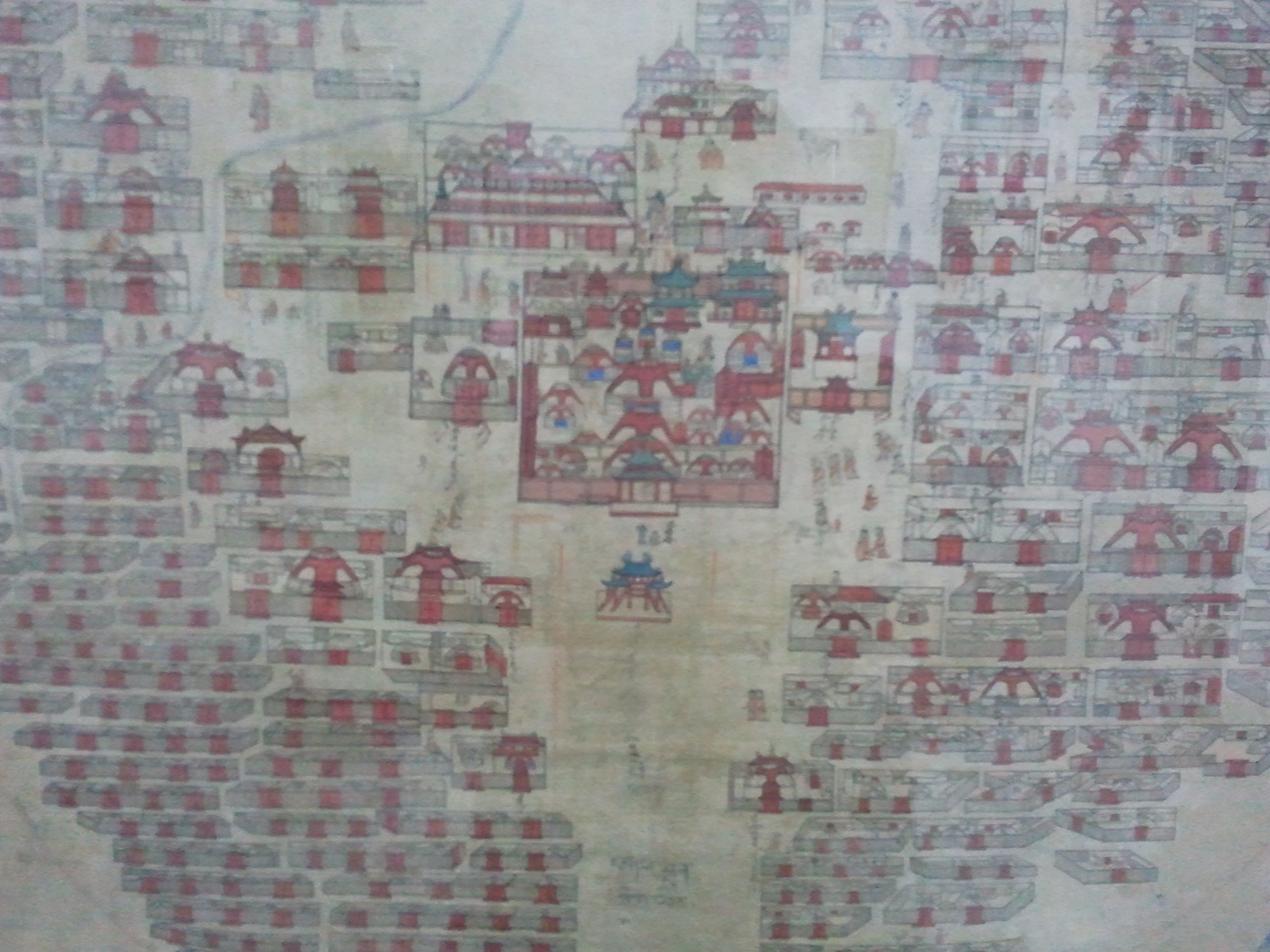
Detail of 19th-century painting of Urga (Ulaanbaatar)

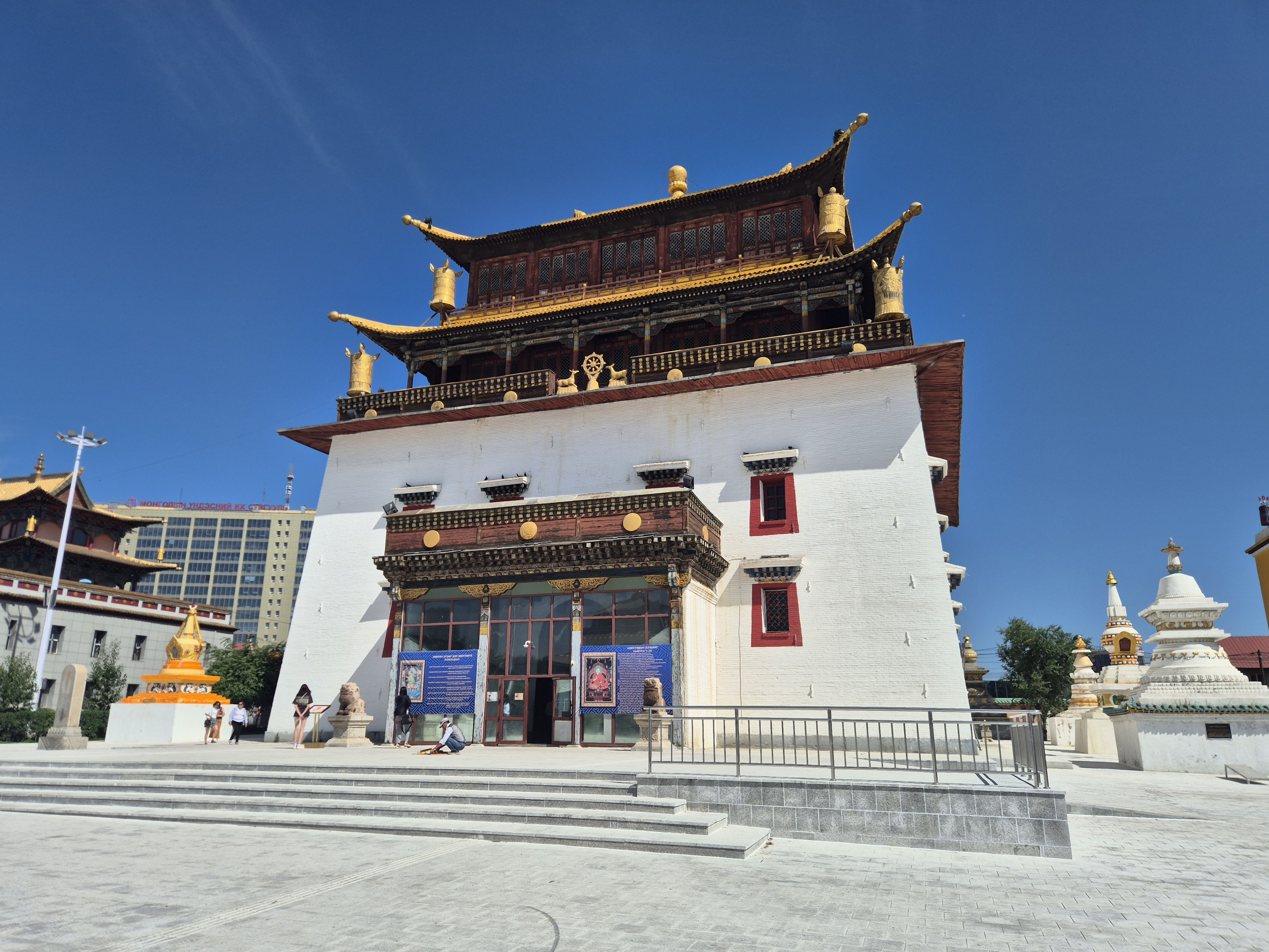
Megjid Janraisig Temple

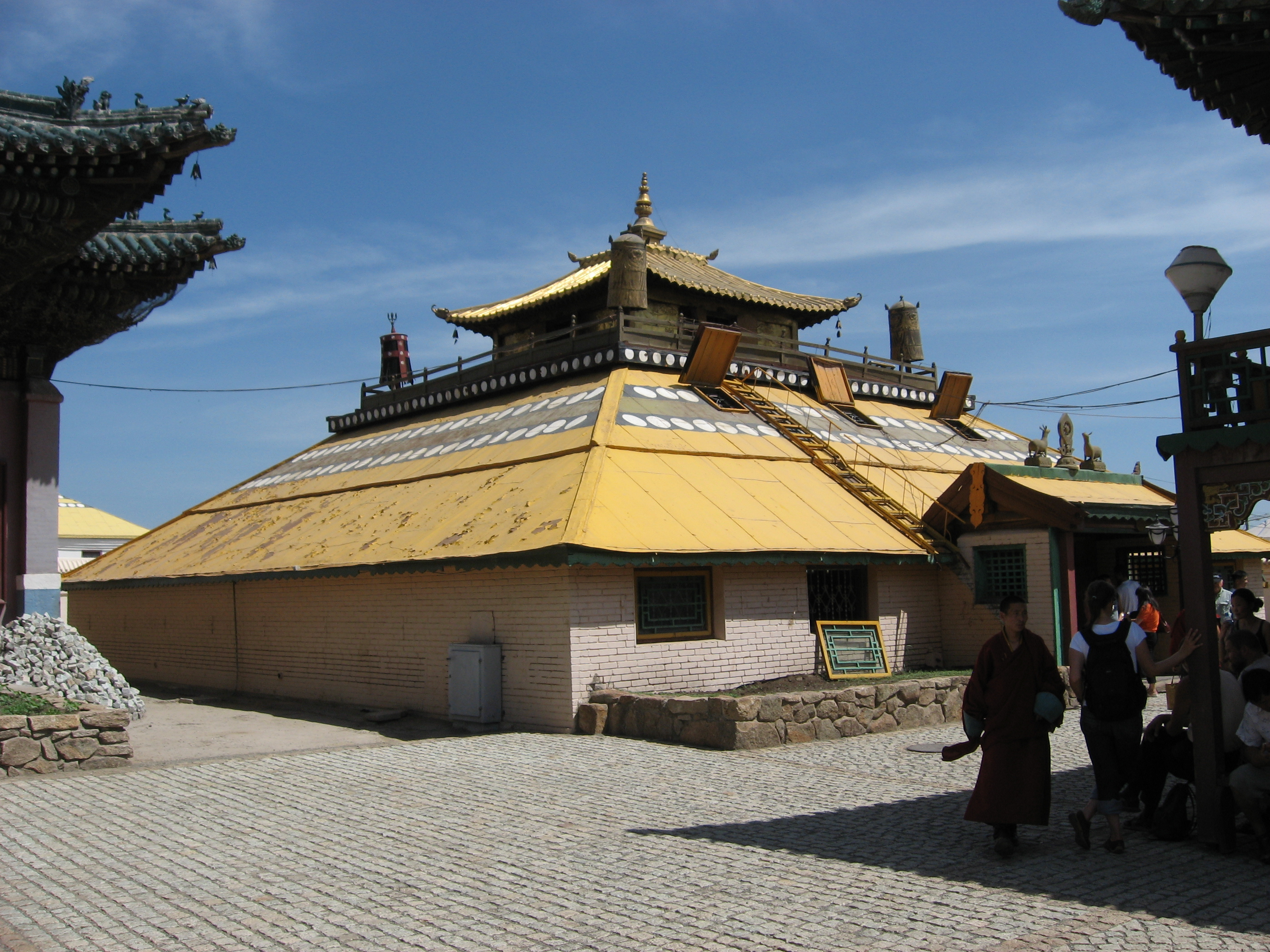
Tsogchin Dugan temple (1838) at Gandan Monastery in Ulaanbaatar

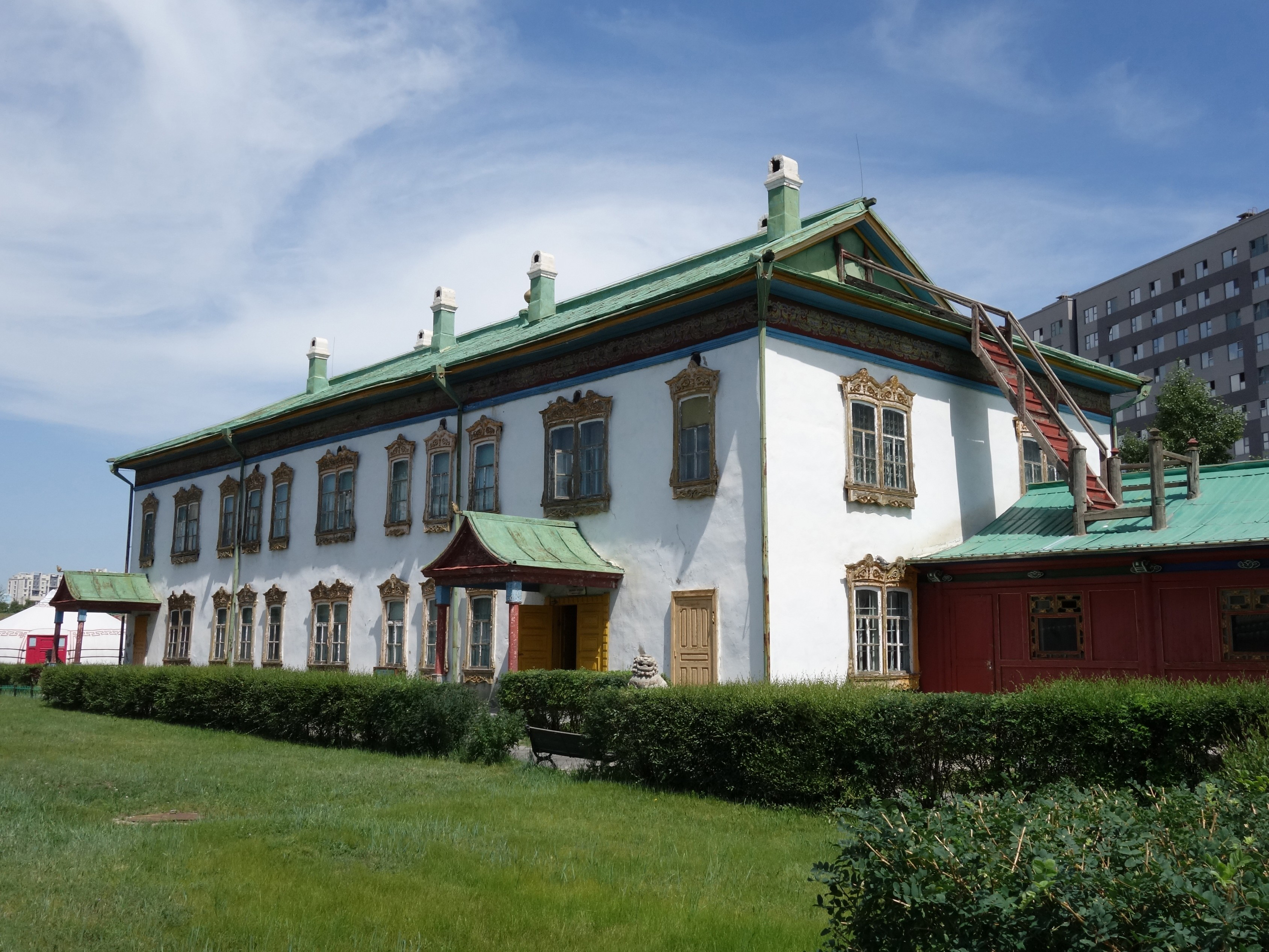
The Bogd Khan's winter home

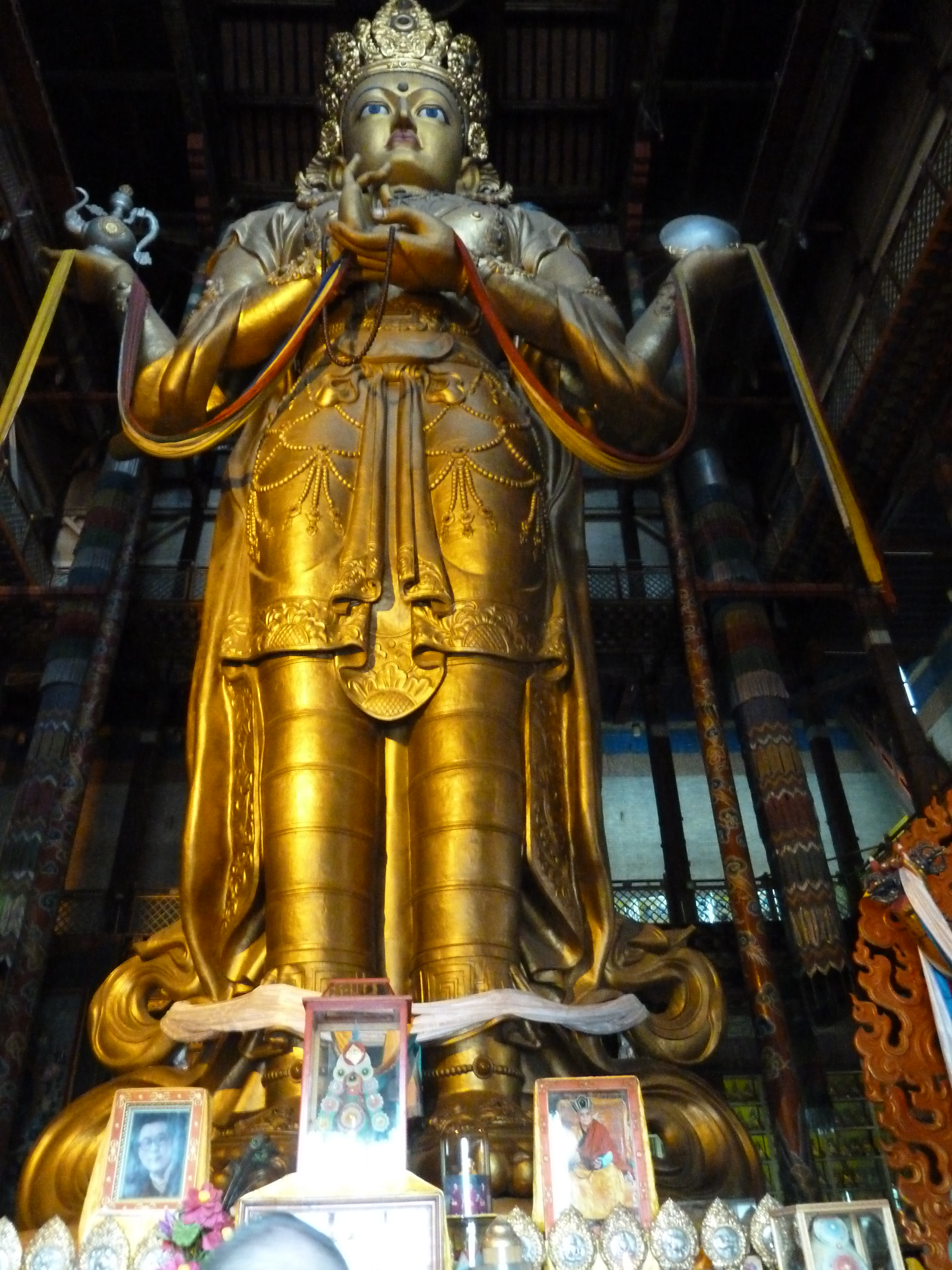
Statue of Avalokiteśvara (Mongolian: Migjid Janraisig) at Gandantegchinlen Monastery in Ulaanbaatar

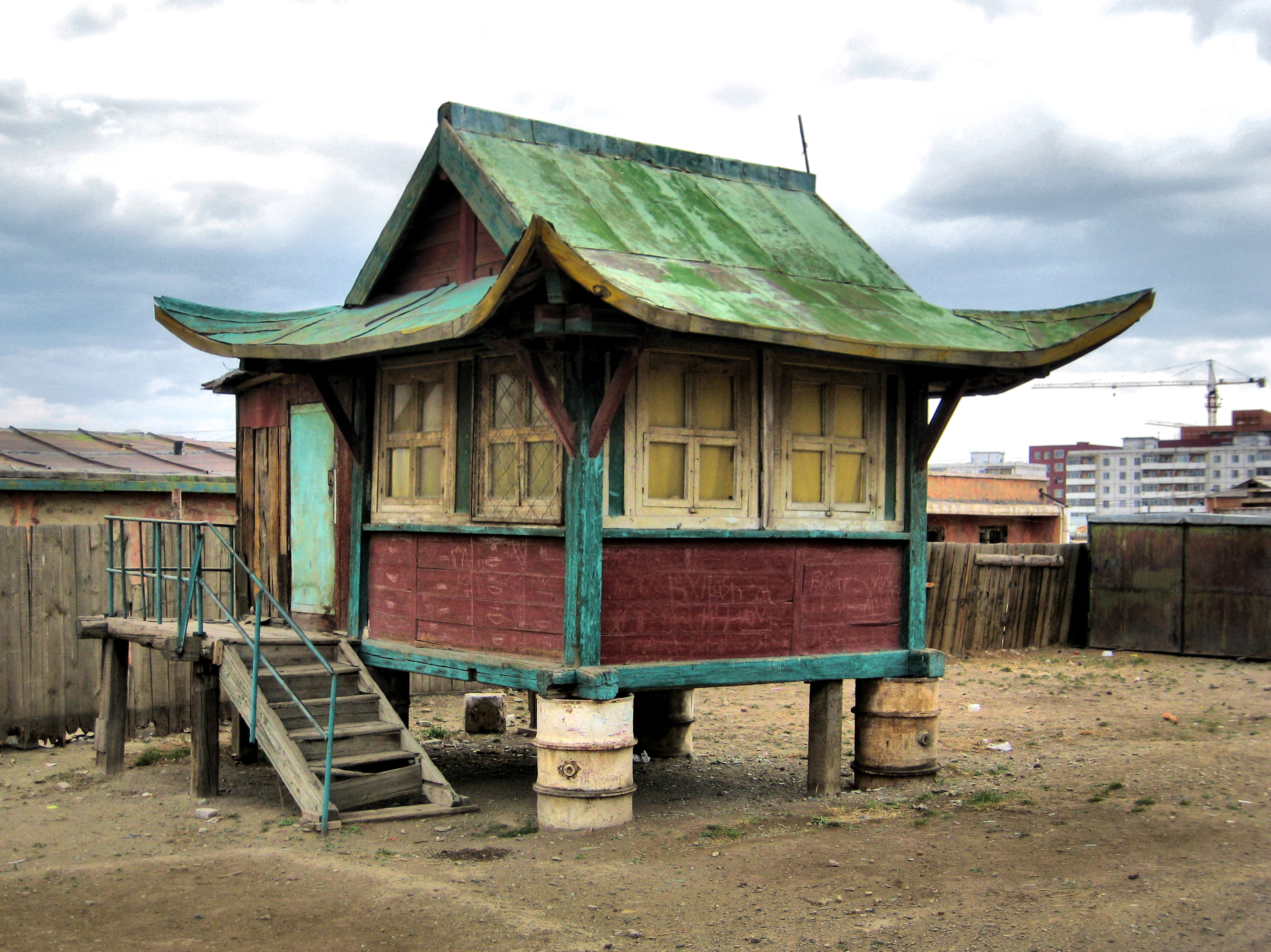
A small temple in Ulaanbaatar

== Revolutionary architecture ==
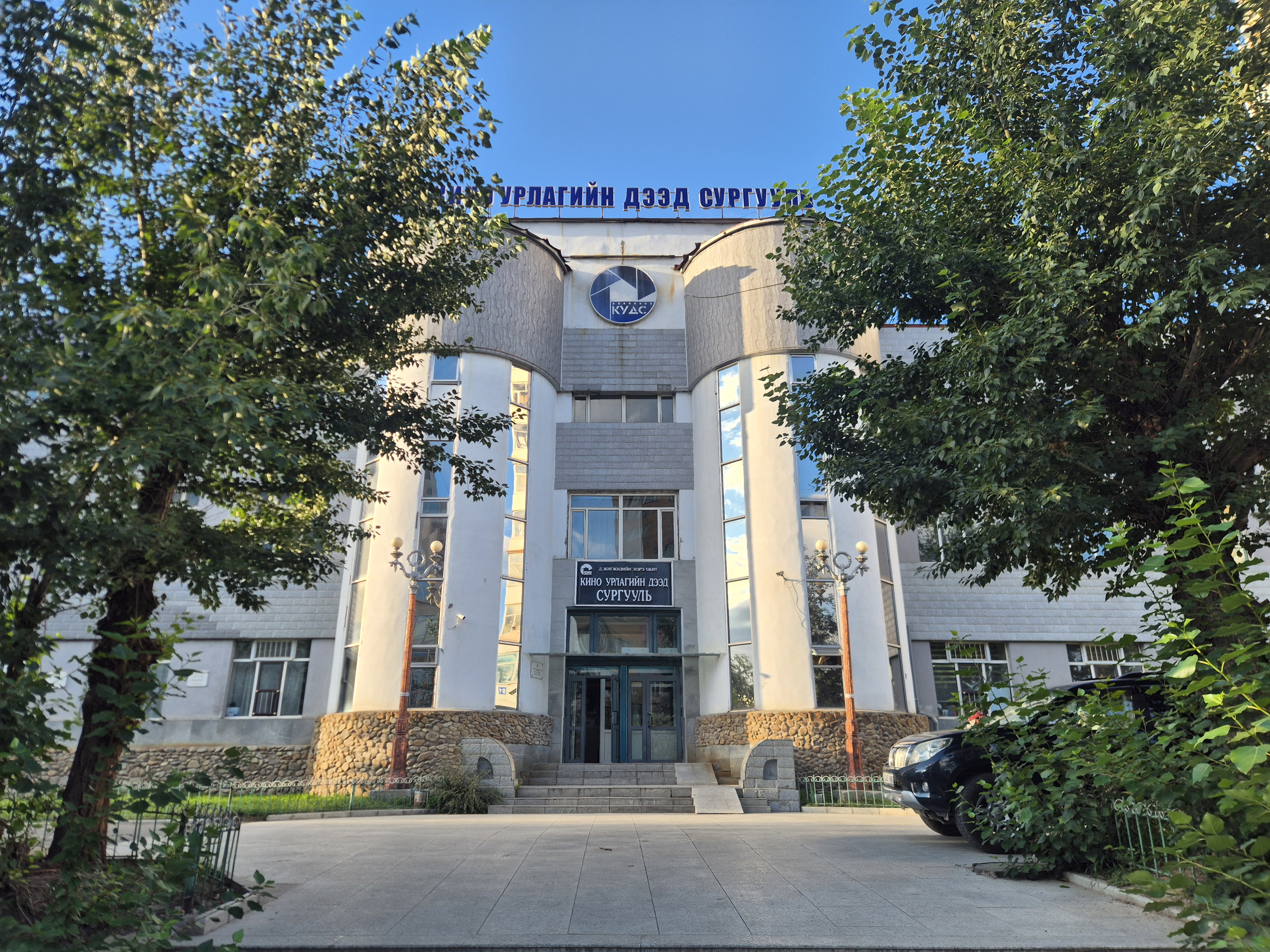
The Military Club, today the University of Film Arts

The October Revolution destroyed much traditional culture, with over 800 monasteries demolished and thousands of lamas purged. The constructivist architecture which flourished in the Soviet Union also took root in Mongolia. The Radio and Postal Communications Committee building, with its pyramid-topped tower, was an example of constructivism. Other examples were the Mongoltrans offices, the Ministry of Internal Affairs and the Military Club.

== Classicism and mass production ==
Downtown Ulaanbaatar was designed by Soviet architects, who developed classicism as Stalinist architecture. The Ministry of Foreign Affairs, the State University, Government House, the Opera House and the State Library exemplify European classicism.

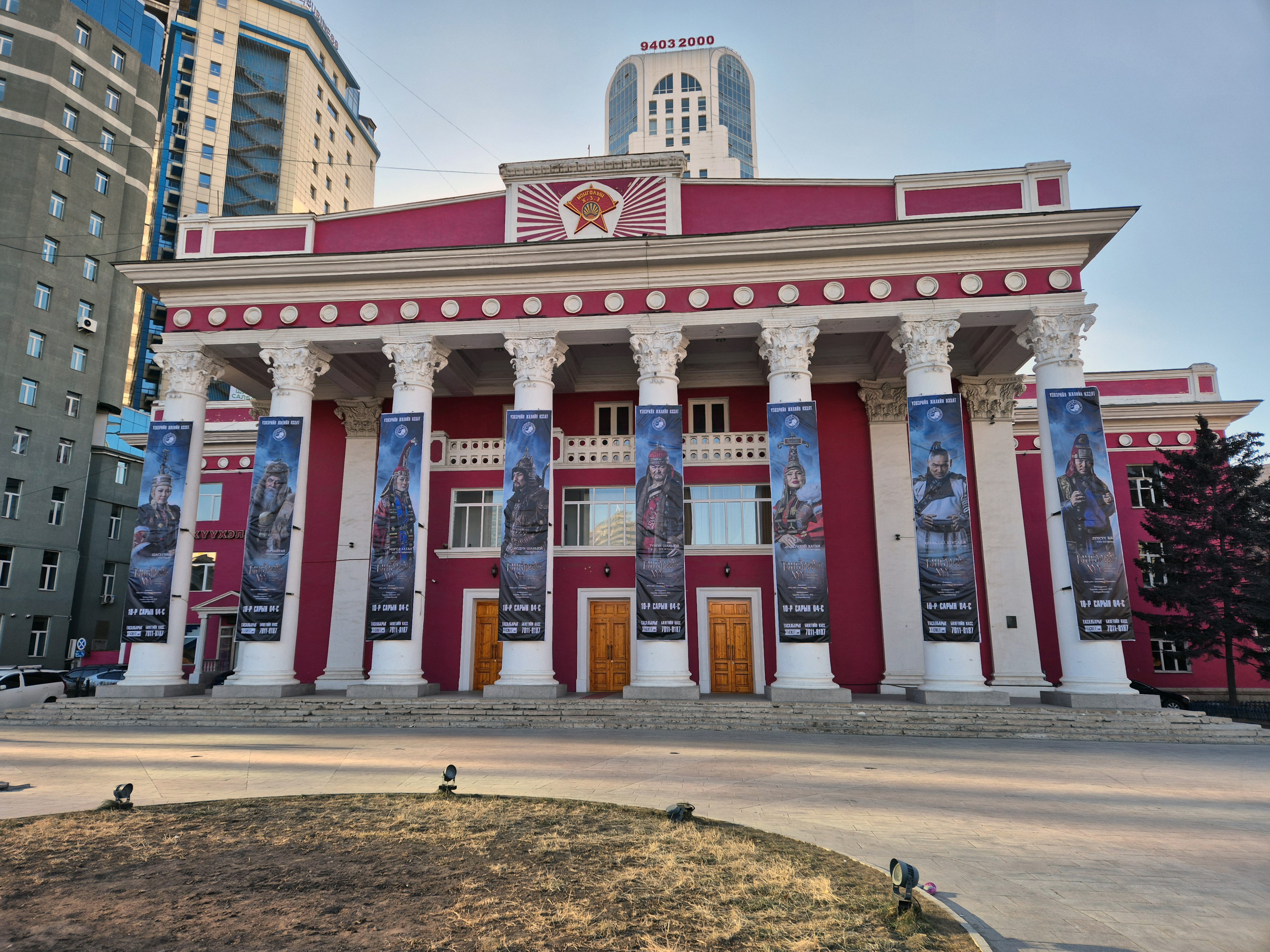
Mongolian State Academic Drama Theatre in Ulaanbaatar

Mongolian architects worked to creatively combine this neoclassicism with traditional Mongolian architecture. The development of downtown Ulaanbaatar continued at the initiative of B. Chimed, who designed the Mongolian State Academic Drama Theatre, the Mongolian Natural History Museum, and the Ulaanbaatar Hotel. The theatre has the quadratic plane and double-tier marquee roof of Mongolian architecture; it and his other buildings Chimed's use of indigenous traditions in contemporary architecture. This direction was followed by other architects, including B. Dambiinyam with the Urt Tsagaan commercial and service center, and the Ministry of Health building, and A. Hishigt with the Astronomical Observatory, State University Building #2, and Meteorology Building, which are distinct from European architecture.

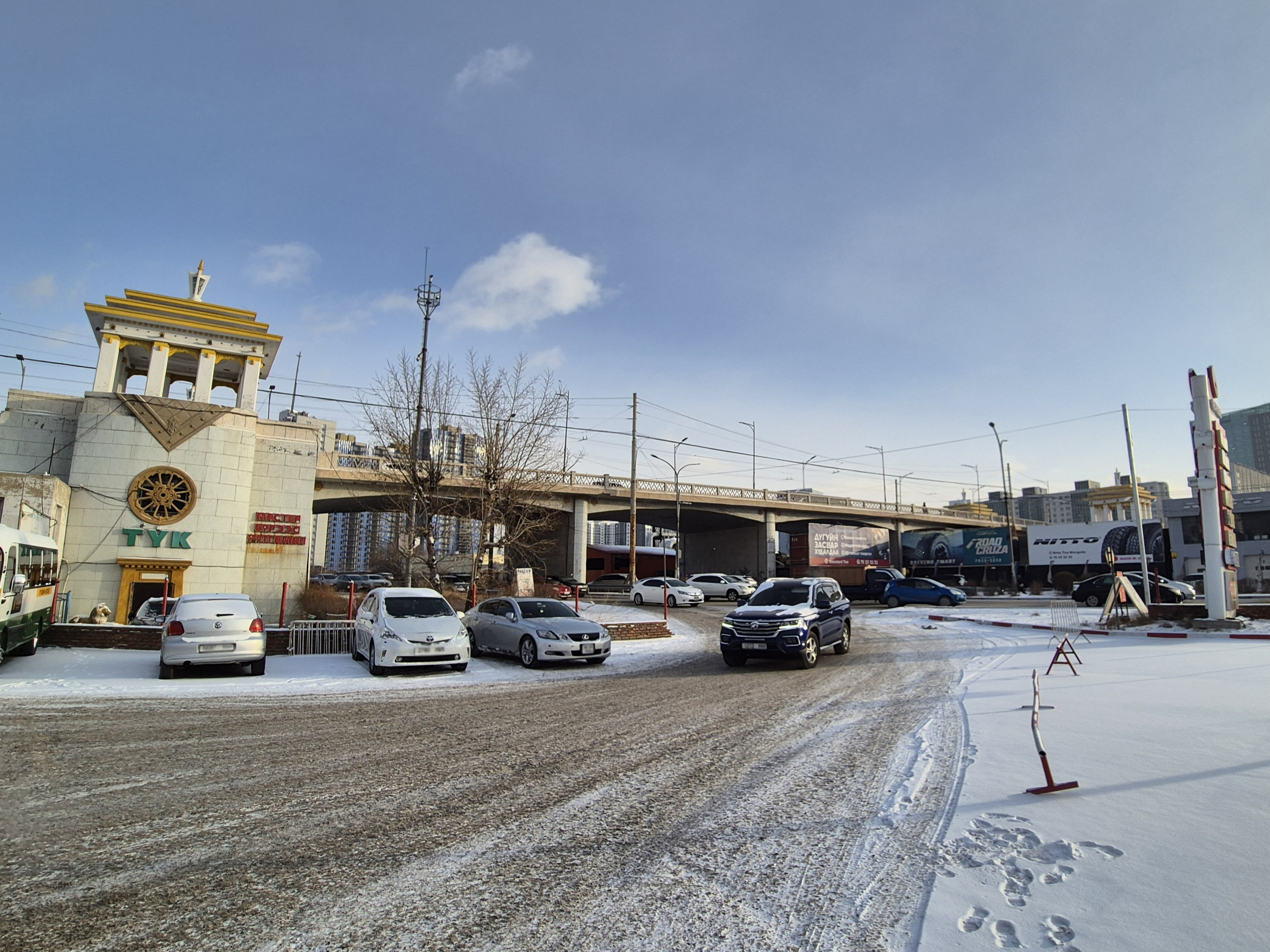
Peace Bridge in Ulaanbaatar

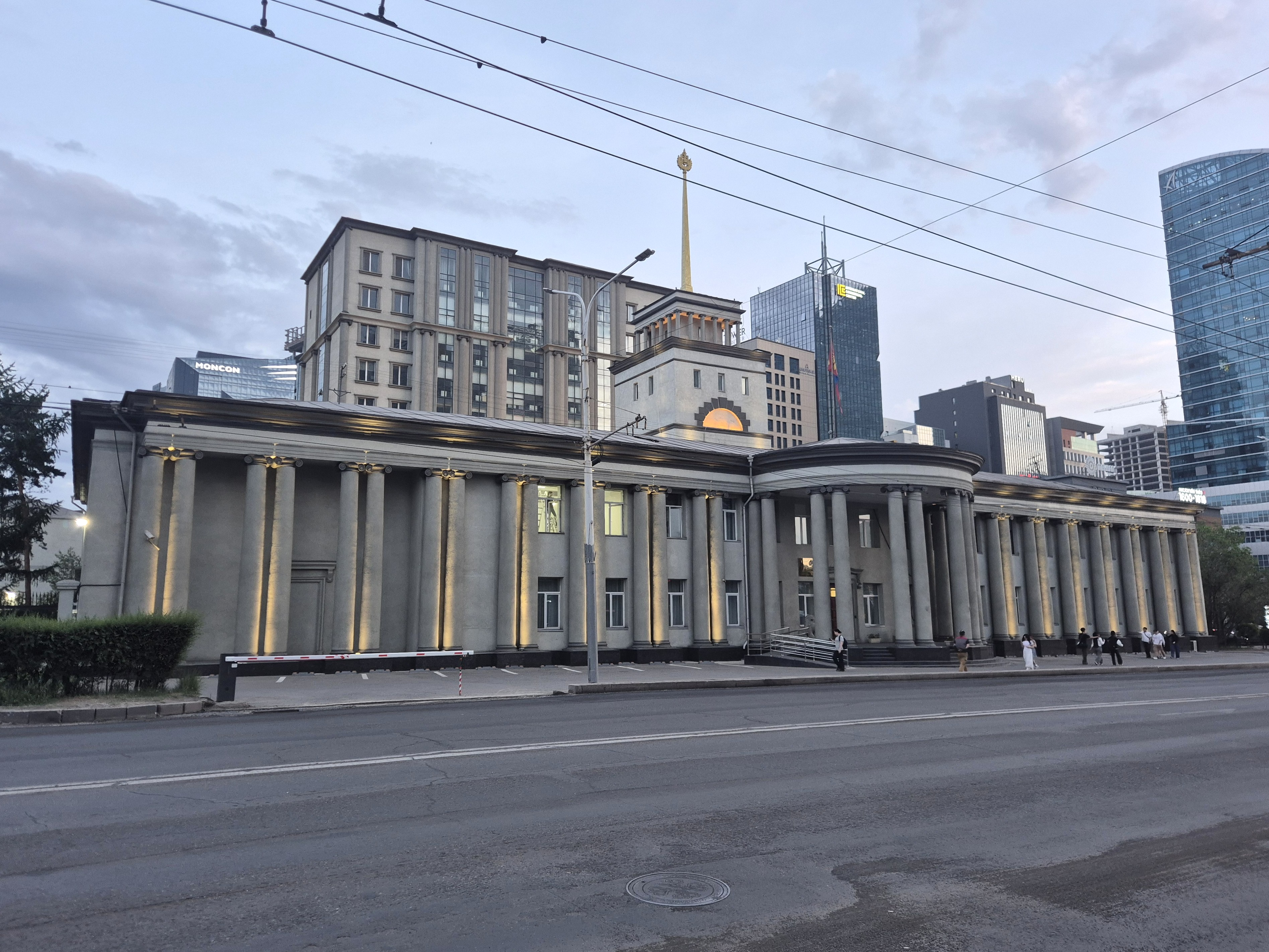
Ministry of Foreign Affairs in Ulaanbaatar

Mongolian architecture was dictated by economy and mass production during the Nikita Khrushchev and Leonid Brezhnev eras in the Soviet Union. The early 1960s were characterised by increased Soviet and Chinese investment due to their competition for Mongolian influence, and the competition resulted in accelerated development. The older districts south of the Middle River (Mongolian: Дунд гол, romanized: Dund gol) and the Peace Bridge were built by Chinese workers.

The architecture of the 1960s and 1970s included monotonous four-, five- and nine-storey apartment blocks, known as Ugsarmal bairs, with simple rectangular shapes, dictated by the need for cheap, speedy construction. Hostility between the Soviet Union and China forced Mongolia to take sides, and the country allied with the former (leading to increased Soviet investment). Apartment districts were built around Ulaanbaatar, including south of the Dund gol river, often by Soviet soldiers. New cities were built (Darkhan, Erdenet and Baganuur) during this period.

Brezhnev's 1974 visit was followed by modern housing in Ulaanbaatar's Bayangol district. The housing consists of nine-storey apartment blocks and five V-shaped 12-storey buildings on Ayush Street, similar to Kalinin Avenue in the centre of Moscow. This street is the city's busiest shopping centre.

The monotony of urban architecture was criticised at four successive congresses of the Mongolian Association of Architects beginning in 1972, but no significant improvement was achieved. The early 1980s brought new public buildings, such as the Lenin Museum and the Yalalt Cinema (now the Tengis). The Ethnographical Museum, in the centre of Ulaanbaatar's amusement park, was designed as a Mongolian castle surrounded by walls on an island in an artificial lake. The winter house of the international children's Nairamdal camp was designed as an ocean liner travelling in a sea of mountains. One of the largest monuments of the socialist period is the Palace of Culture. Although it has elements of Mongolian architecture, its basic design is also found in the capitals of many former socialist countries.

Amid a vision of replacing yurts with apartment blocks, the ger districts were seen as temporary, transient housing. Under socialism, the state made little or no effort (except for bathhouses) to develop the ger districts, which became Mongolian shanty towns.

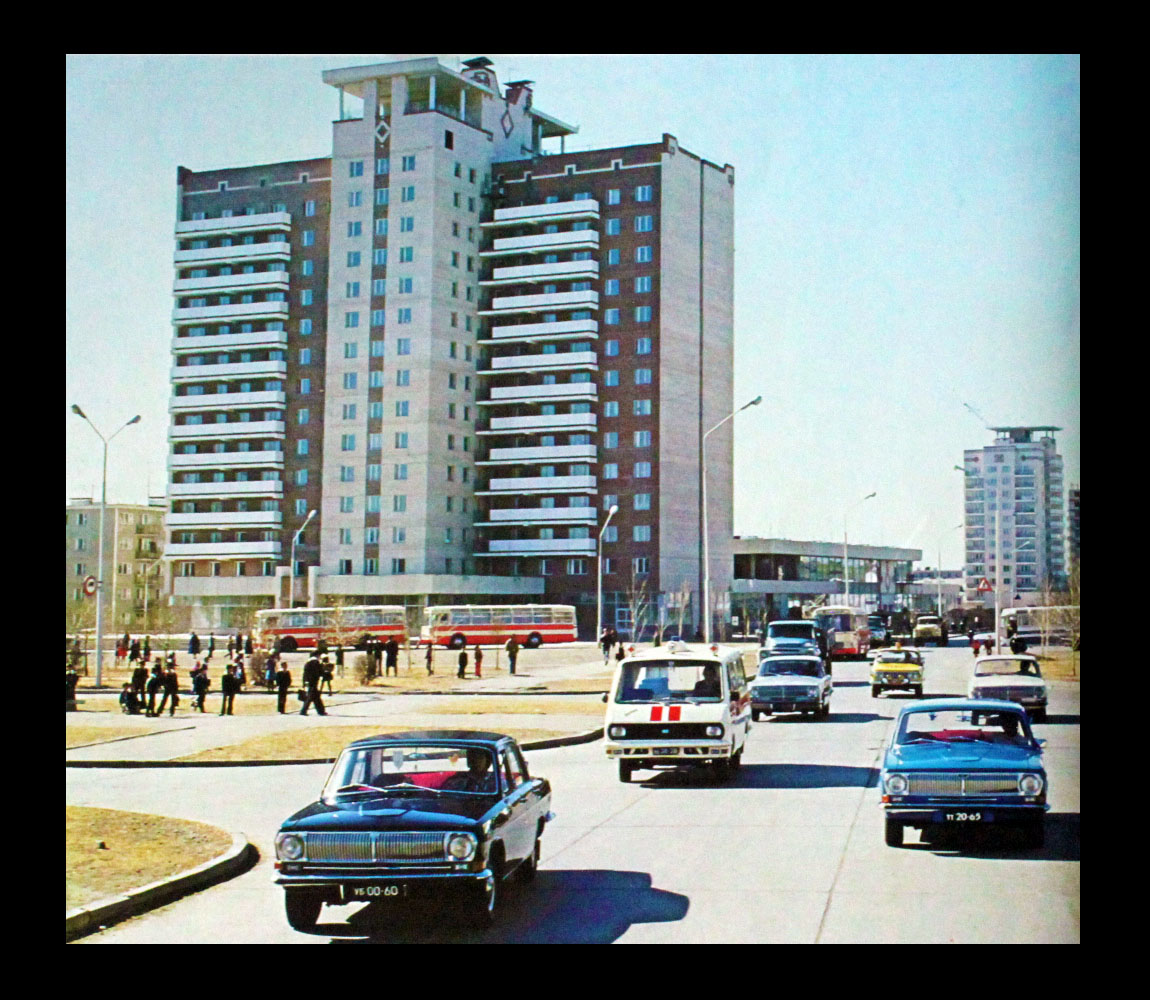
5th Khoroolol in Sükhbaatar district, Ulaanbaatar

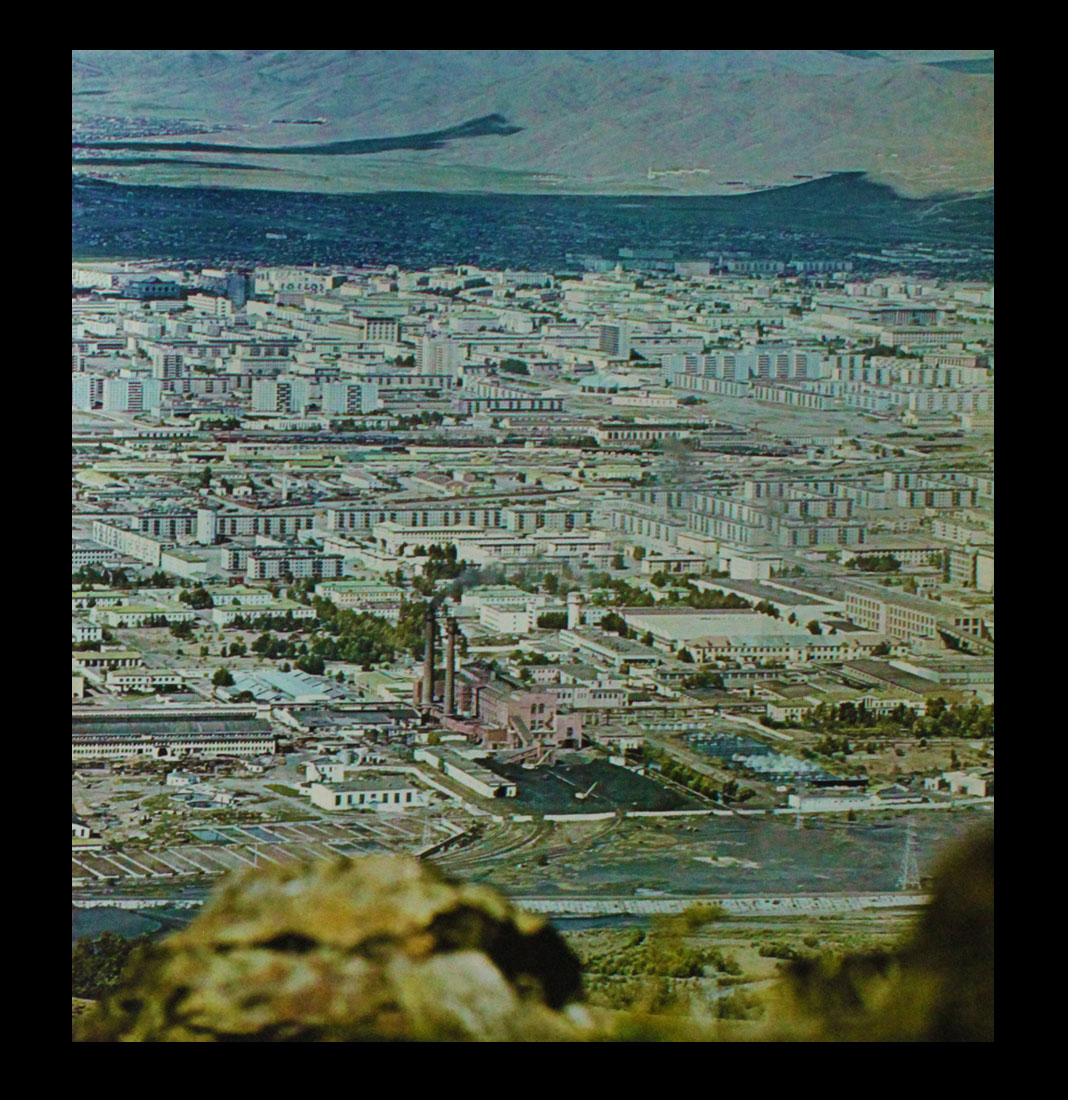
Aerial view of Ulaanbaatar in 1974

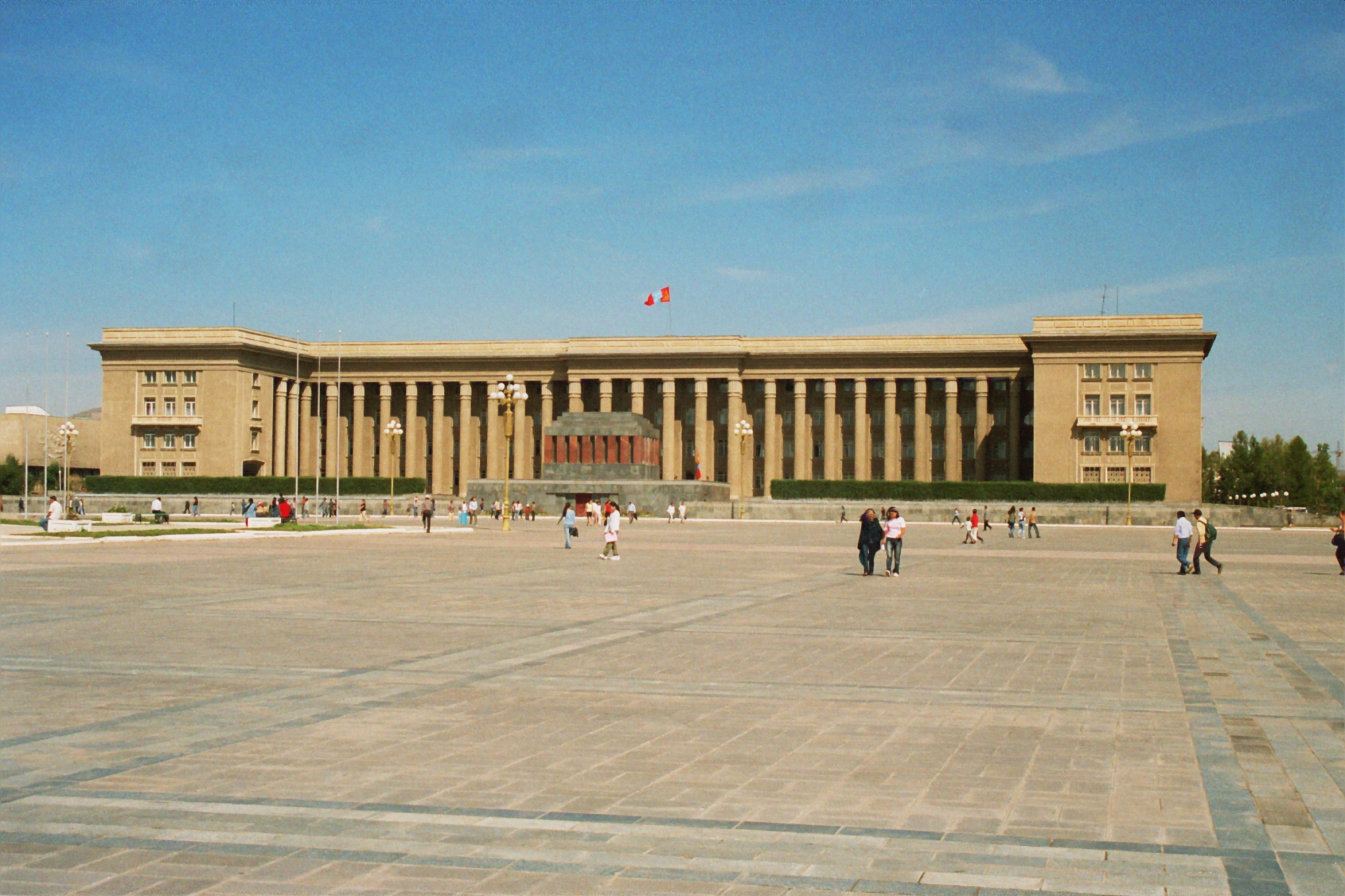
Government Palace of the Mongolian People's Republic, with the mausoleum of Damdiny Sükhbaatar

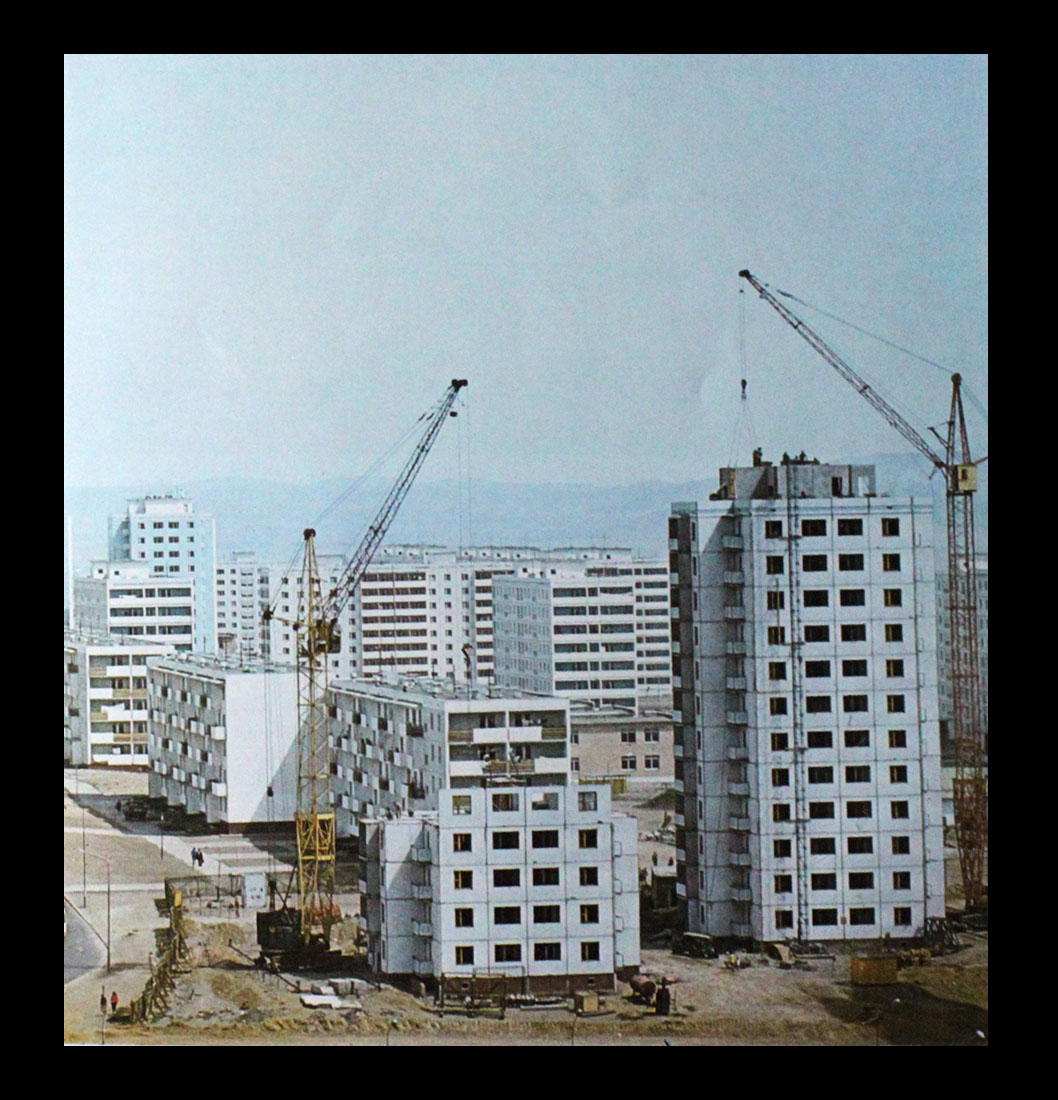
Construction of Ugsarmal bairs in 1974

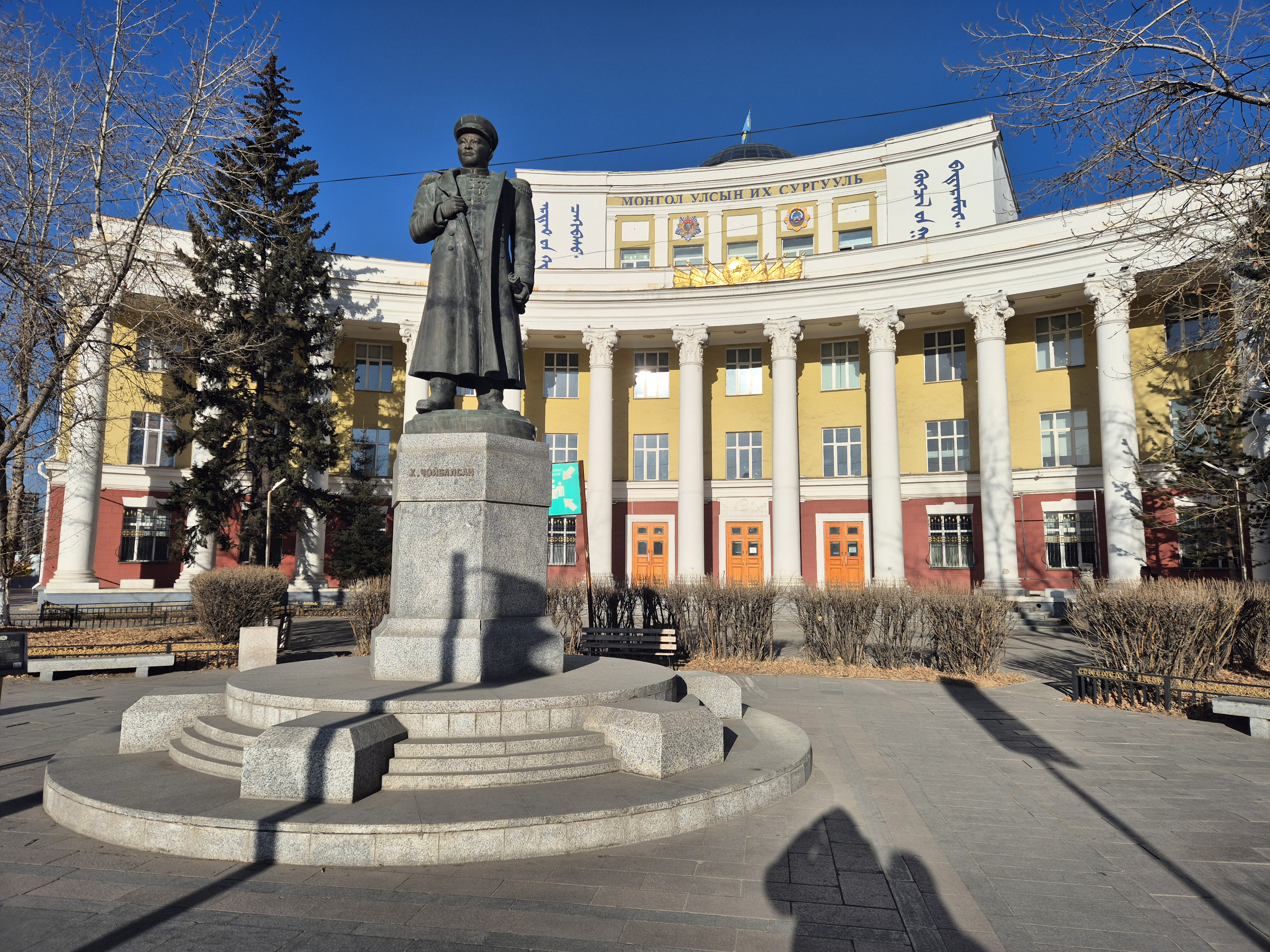
National University of Mongolia
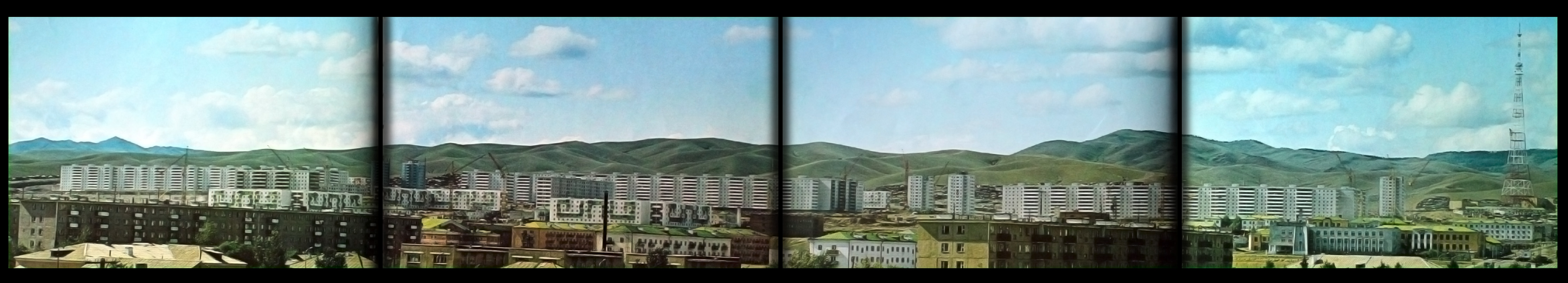
Panorama of the 3rd and 4th Khoroolol in Bayangol district, Ulaanbaatar

== Modern period ==
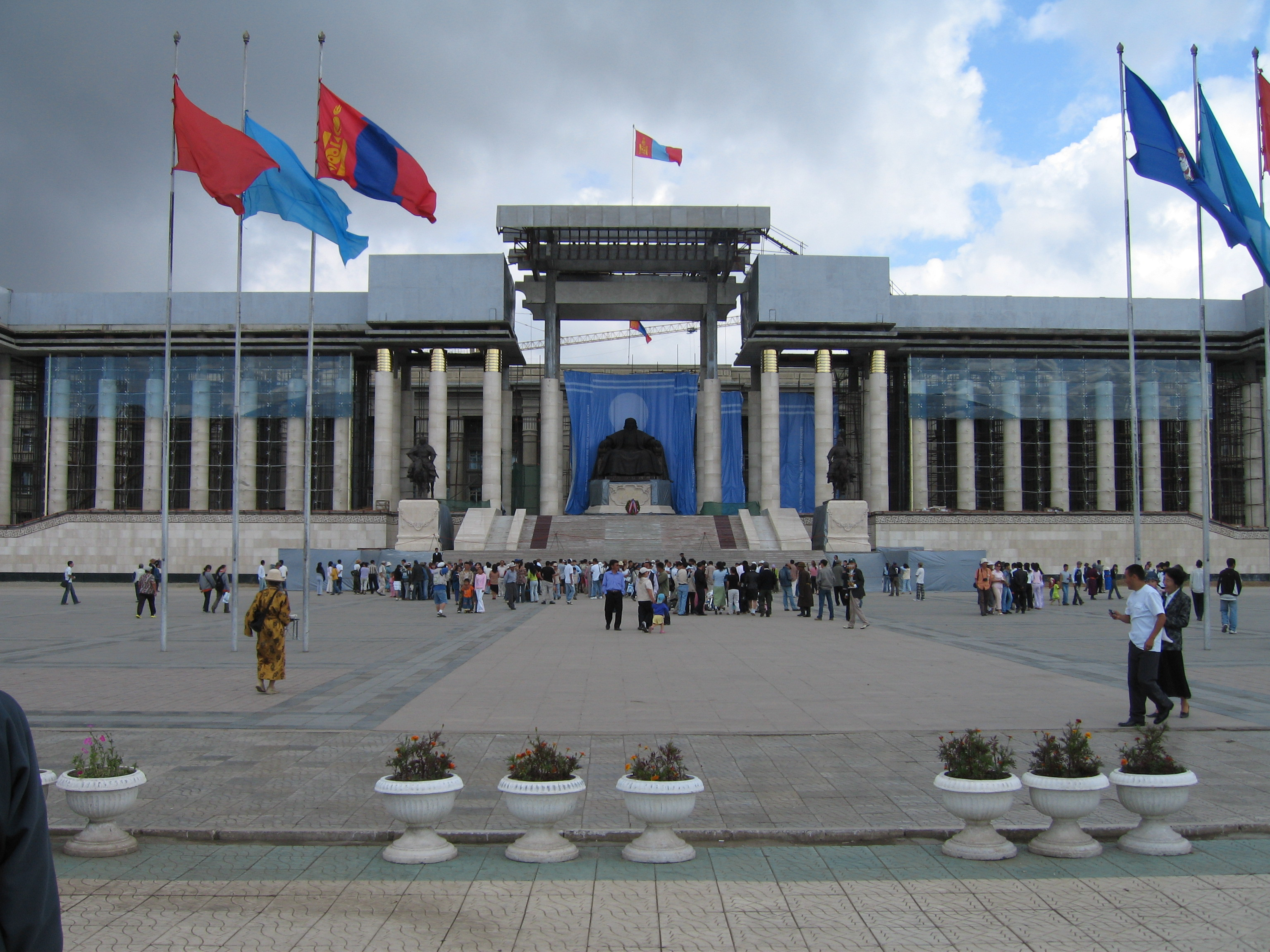
The Government Palace during a 2005 renovation

Perestroika and the transition to democracy induced interest in traditional history and culture and free thinking in the arts and architecture. Nearly the entire population of Mongolia donated toward repairs to the Chenrezig temple in the Gandan Tegchinling monastery and the re-casting of the statue of Boddhisattva Avalokiteshvara. A group of artists and architects led by the actor Bold, an enthusiast for traditional architecture, developed a project to make Ulaanbaatar an Asian city. They began building traditional gates and shades in the Street of Revolutionaries and other streets and in the amusement park. Although the project ended at the beginning of the 1998 Russian financial crisis, Mongolia's Buddhist sangha continued restoring and founding monasteries.

Modern architecture returned as the economy began to recover from the financial crisis. The completion of the tall glass Ardiin Bank building (now hosting the Ulaanbaatar Bank) and the glass Chinggis Khan Hotel complex during the second half of 1990s marked the beginning of a new age in Mongolian architecture.

The Bodhi Tower, built in 2004, consists of two buildings. The one facing Sükhbaatar Square is a four-storey classical building which harmonises with the surrounding 1950s architecture. A high-rise tower, the other building, faces the back street; a similar principle was used in the design of the previous period's Palace of Culture. Another contemporary building is Ulaanbaatar's Narantuul Tower. Hotel Mongolia, in the city's Bayanzürkh district, has a silver-tree fountain at its centre reminiscent of Karakorum.

Prime Minister Tsakhiagiin Elbegdorj appointed a group of professionals to develop a project for a new city at Karakorum. According to the prime minister, the new city would become the capital of Mongolia. After his resignation and the appointment of Miyeegombyn Enkhbold as prime minister, the project was abandoned.

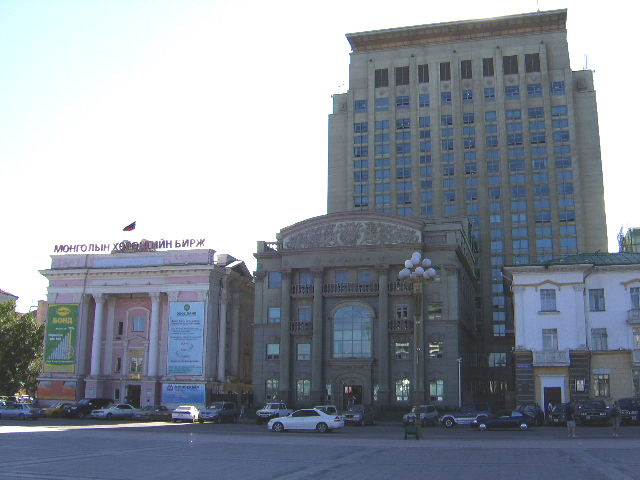
The Bodhi Tower complex (background) harmonises with the Mongolian Stock Exchange (left)

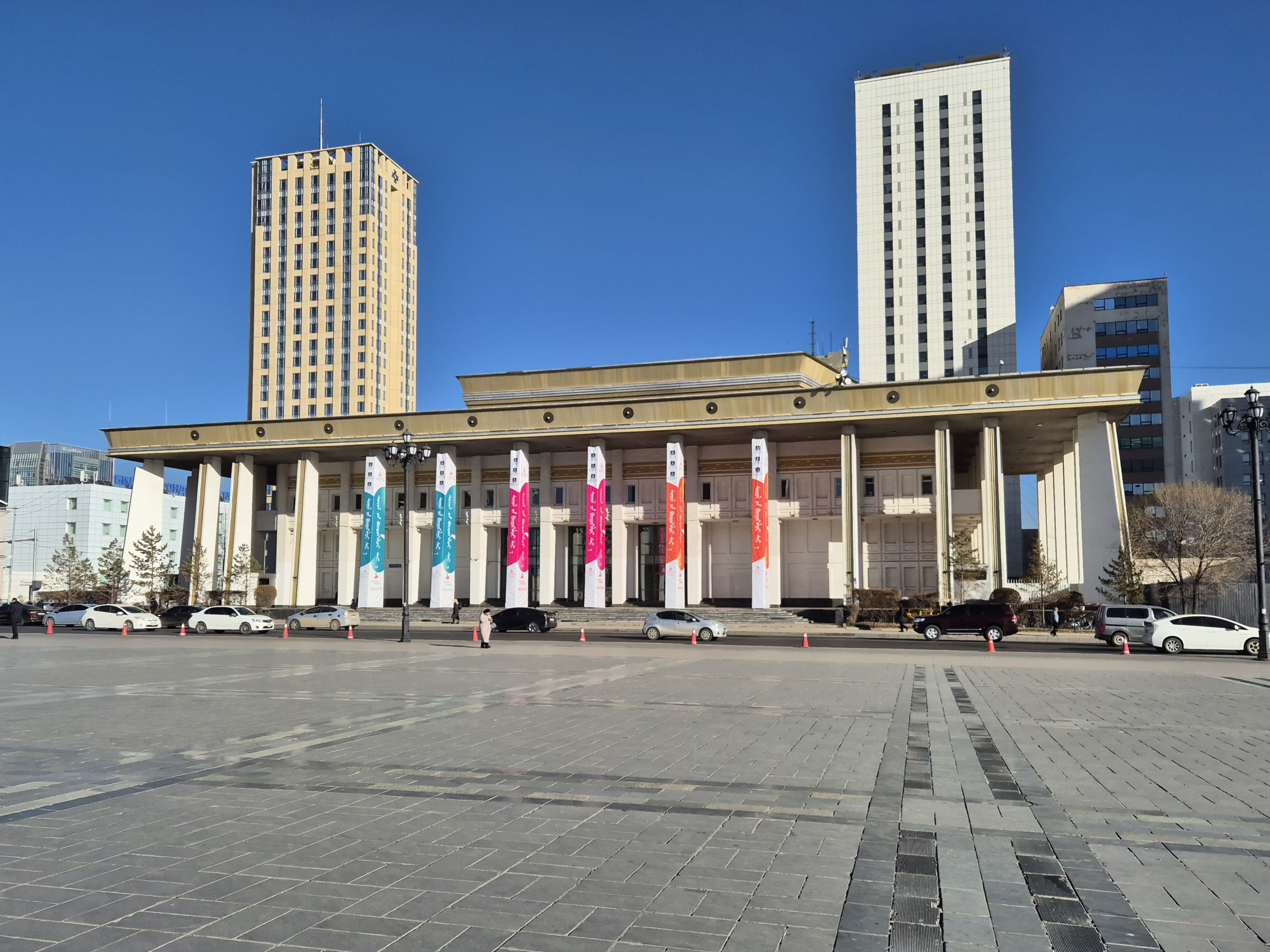
Palace of Culture

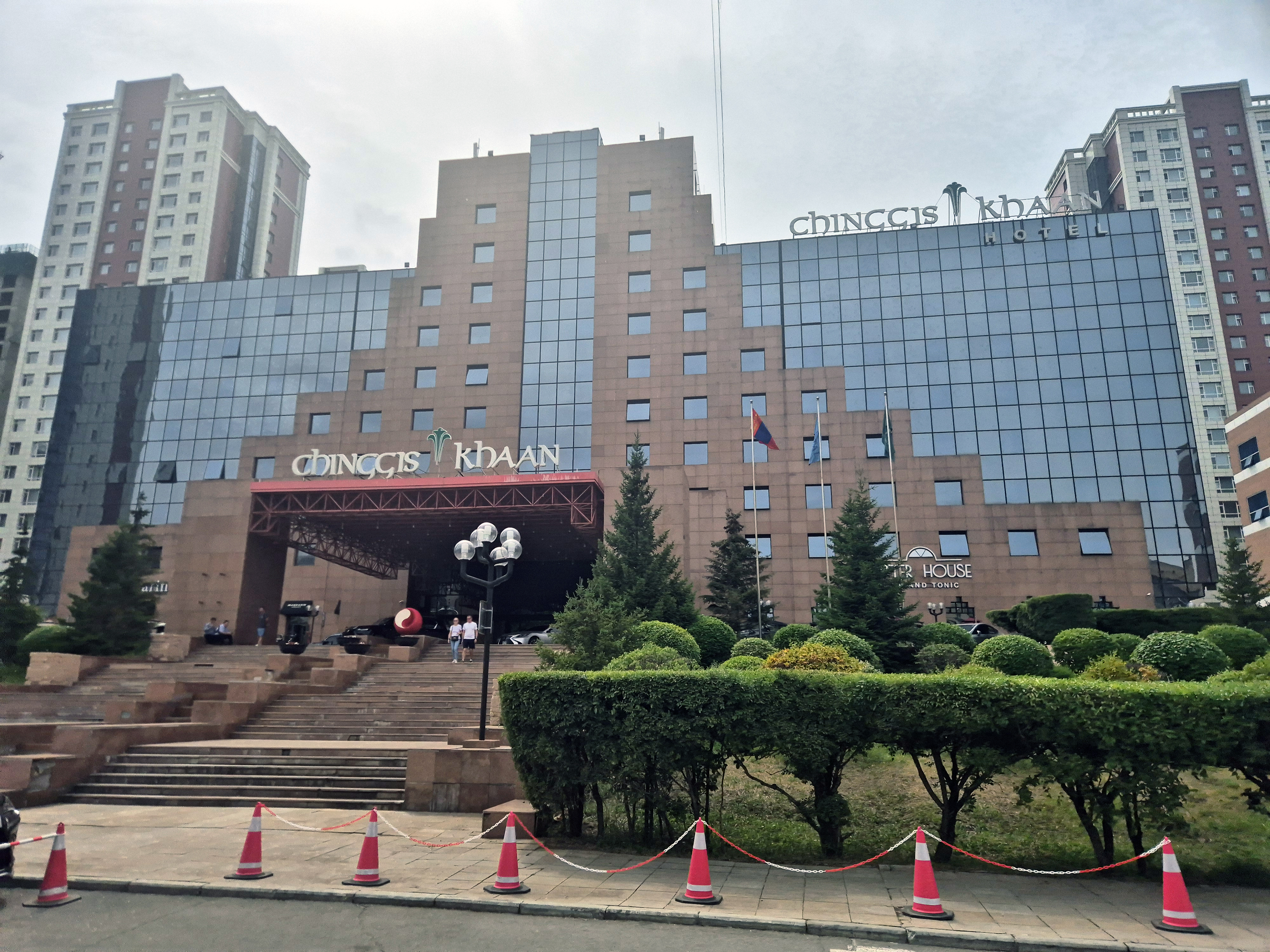
Chinggis Khaan Hotel in Ulaanbaatar

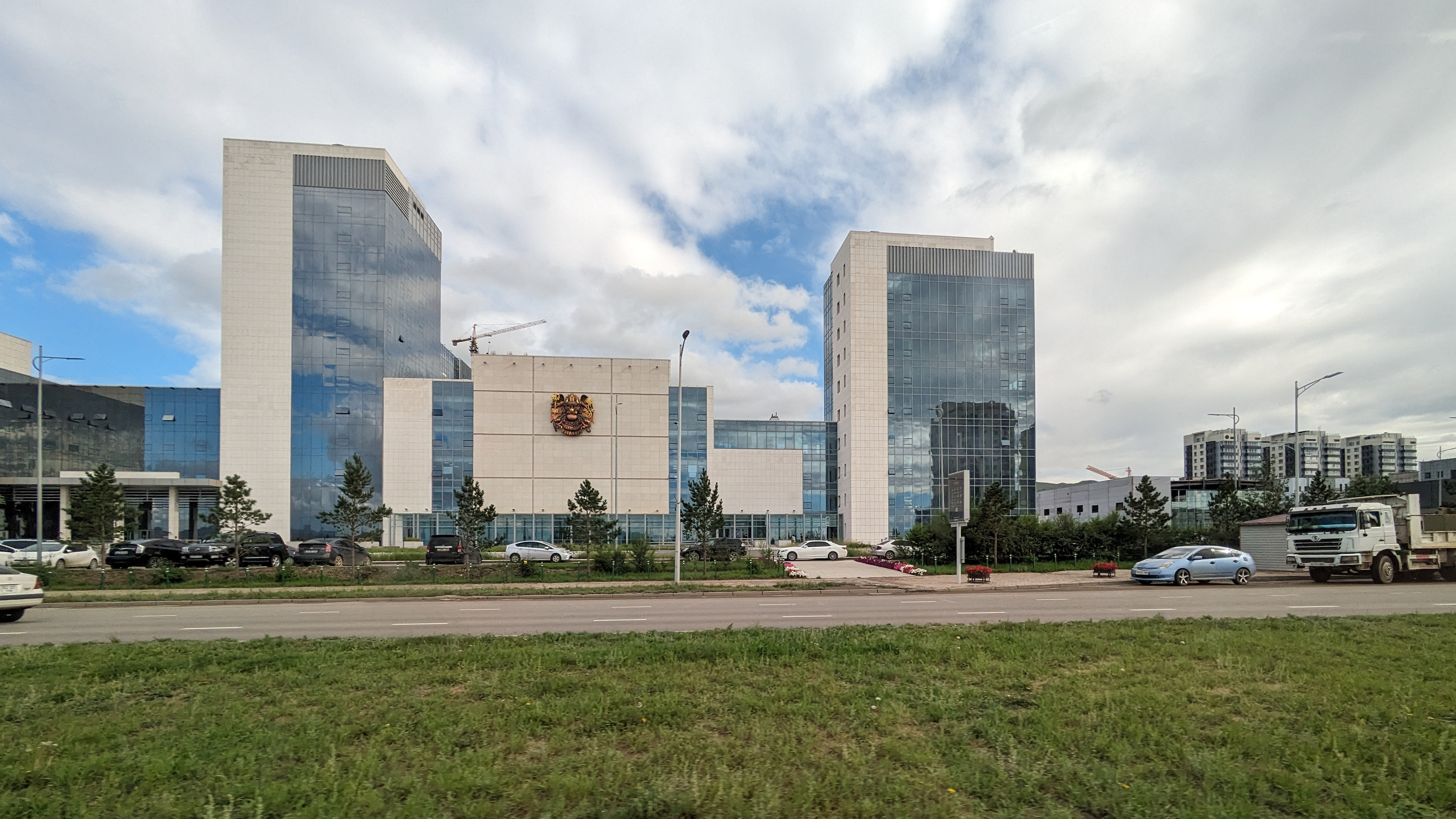
Ulaanbaatar City Hall, the meeting place of the Ulaanbaatar City Council

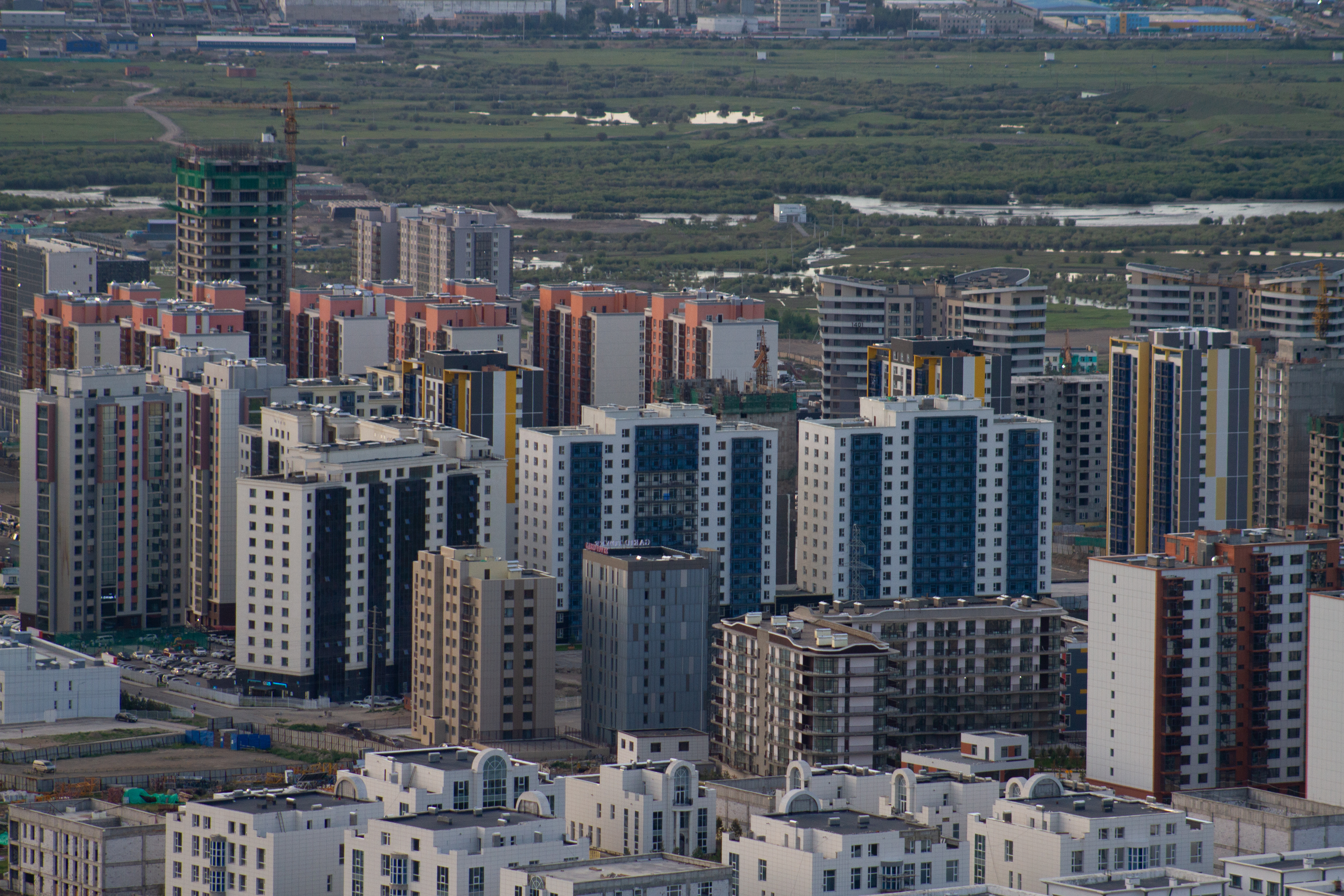
High-rise apartment buildings in Yaarmag area of Ulaanbaatar

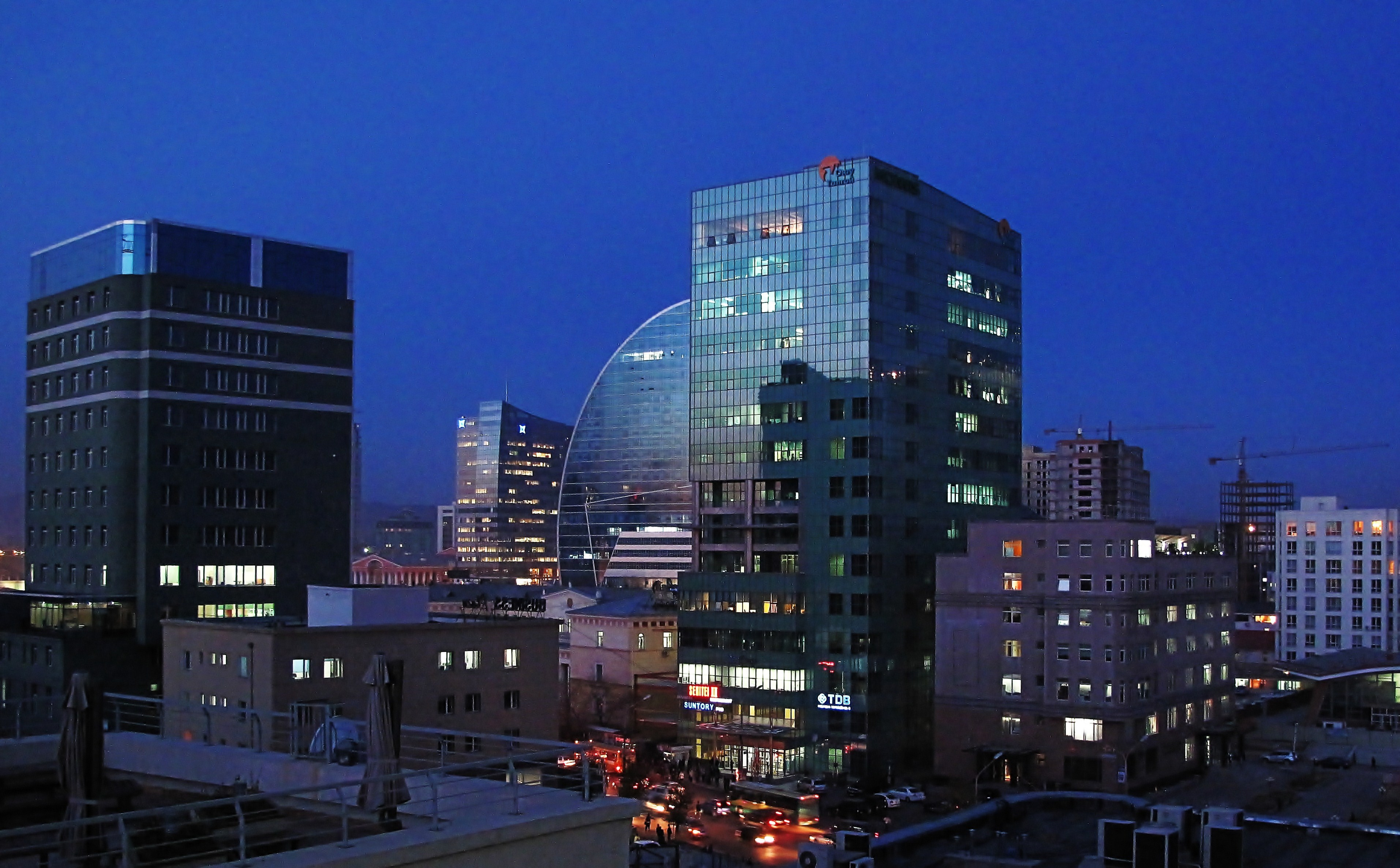
Downtown Ulaanbaatar at night

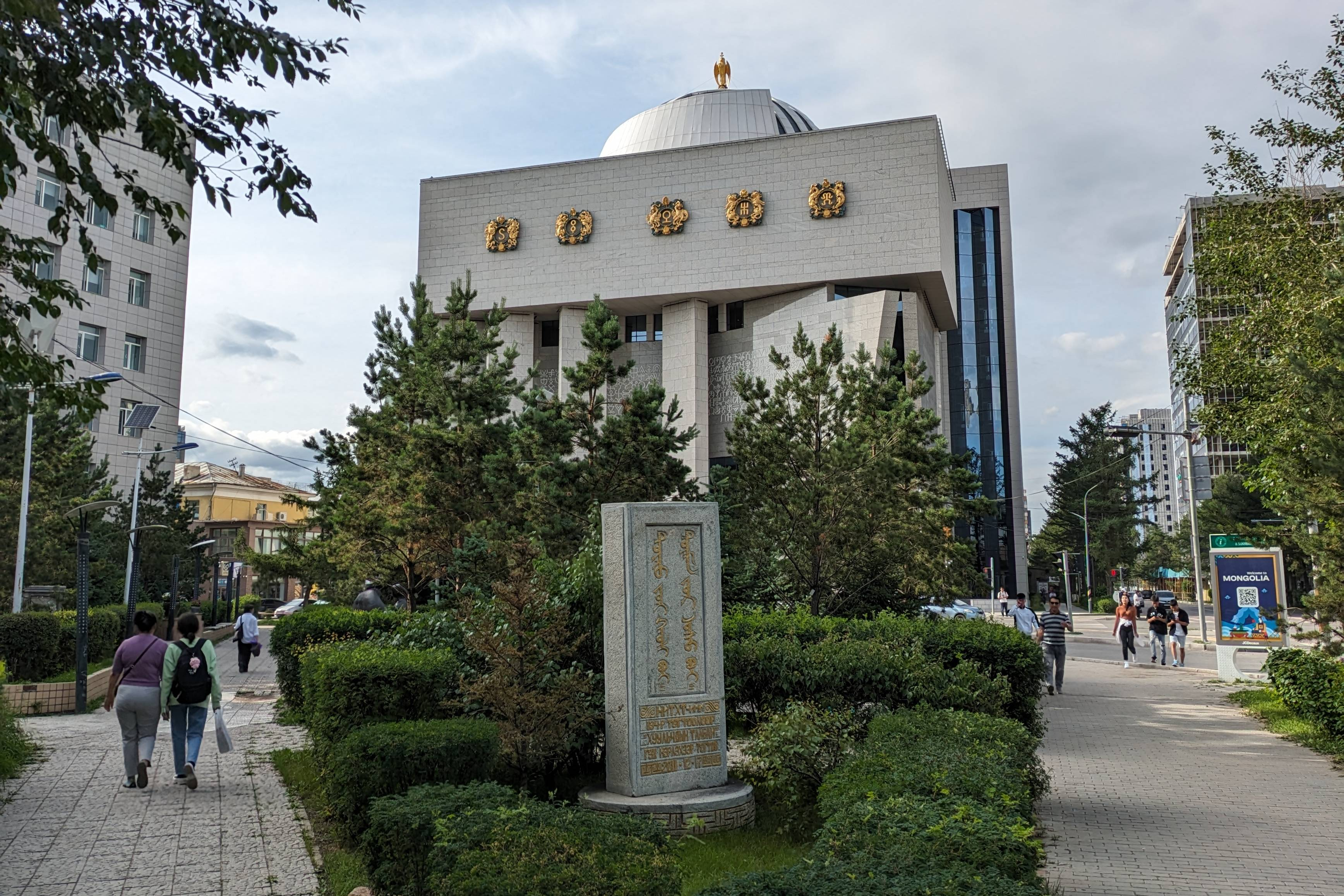
Chinggis Khaan National Museum, established on the site of the original Mongolian Natural History Museum building

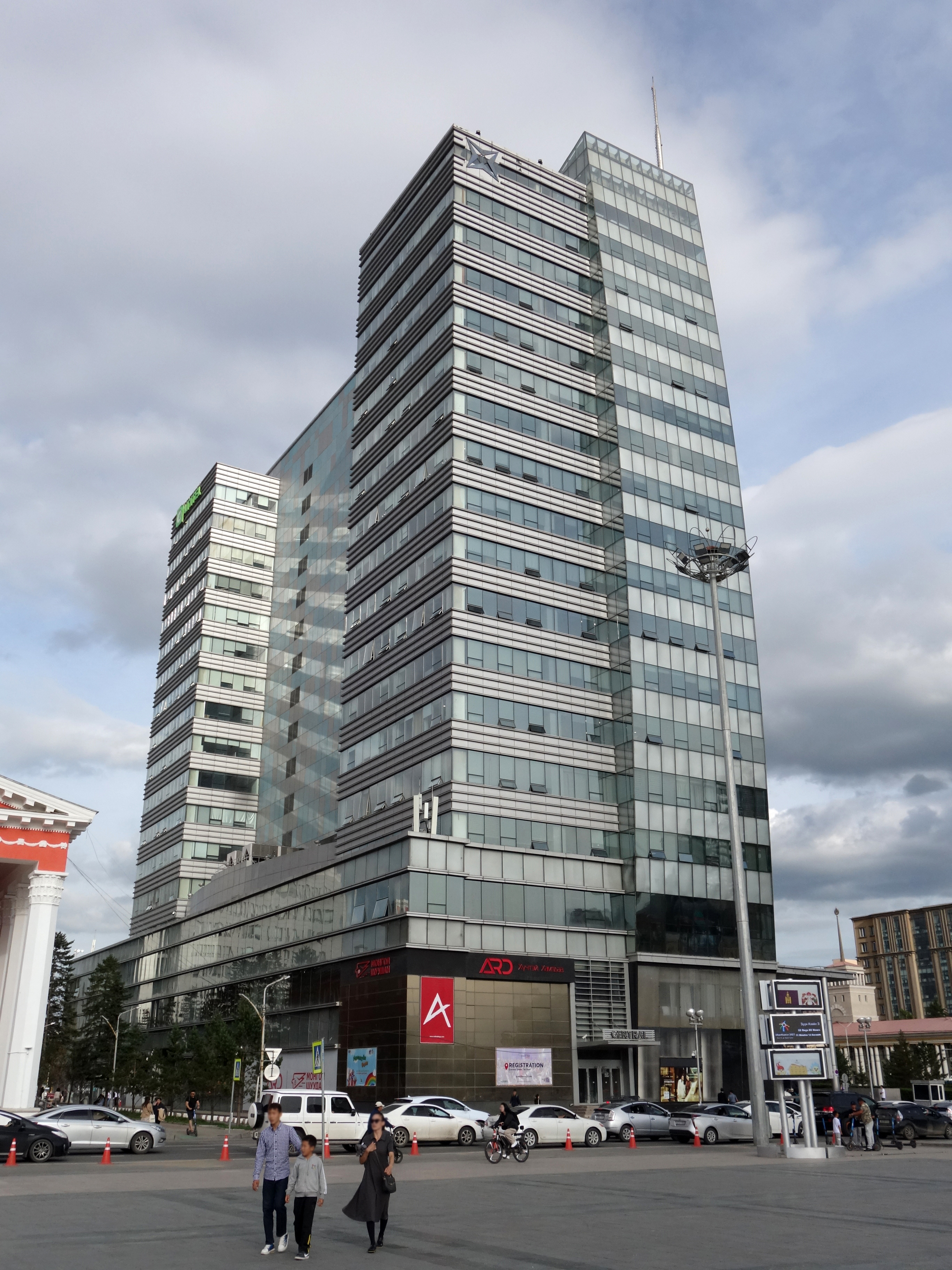
The Central Tower, near downtown Ulaanbaatar

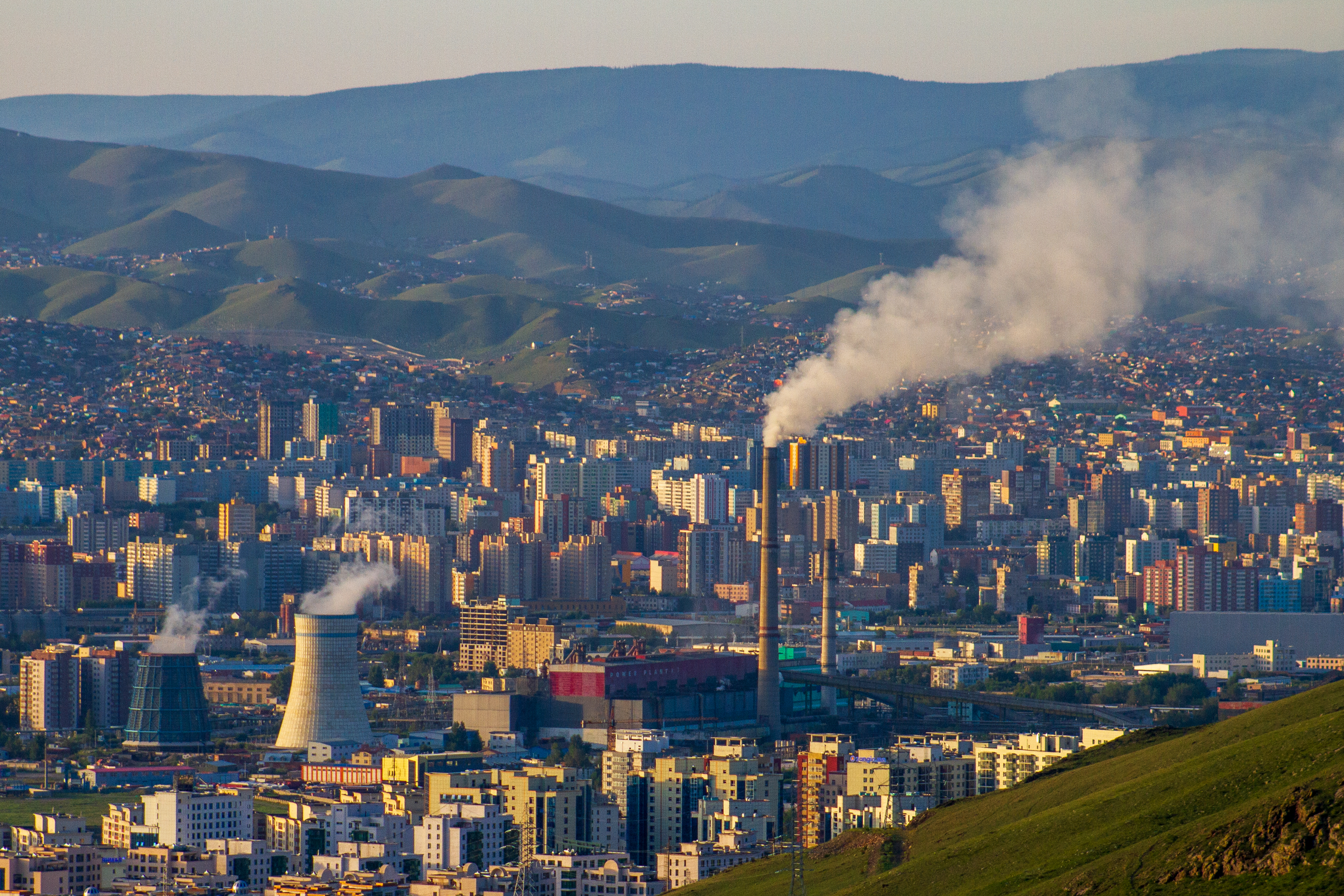
Aerial view of Ulaanbaatar in 2023

== See also ==
- List of historical cities and towns of Mongolia
- Khanbaliq
- Gandantegchinlen Khiid Monastery
- Manjusri Monastery
- National Academic Theatre of Opera and Ballet of Mongolia
- Temple of the Five Pagodas
- Noin-Ula
- Orkhon Valley
- Artificial Lake Castle
- Mongol Castle
- Ugsarmal bair
- International Commercial Center
- Ulaanbaatar railway station
