= List of bridges in Laos =

== Major bridges ==
This table presents a non-exhaustive list of the road and railway bridges with spans greater than 100 metres (328 ft) or total lengths longer than 1,000 metres (3,281 ft).

	Name	Lao	Span	Length	Type	Carries Crosses	Opened	Location	Province	Ref.
1	Third Thai–Lao Friendship Bridge	ຂົວມິດຕະພາບ ລາວ-ໄທ ແຫ່ງທຳອິດ 3	180 m (590 ft) (x3)	1,423 m (4,669 ft)	Box girder Prestressed concrete 120+3x180+120	Asian Highway 15; Mekong	2011	Thakhek–Nakhon Phanom; 17°29′07.9″N 104°43′52.6″E	Khammouane; Thailand	
2	Fifth Thai–Lao Friendship Bridge under construction	ຂົວມິດຕະພາບ ລາວ-ໄທ ແຫ່ງທຳອິດ 5	150 m (490 ft) (x3)	1,350 m (4,430 ft)	Extradosed; Concrete box girder deck, 4 concrete pylons	Mekong	2024	Pakxan–Bueng Kan; 18°24′23.9″N 103°34′07.0″E	Bolikhamsai; Thailand	
3	Ban Ladhan Railway Bridge		144 m (472 ft)	1,652 m (5,420 ft)	Box girder Prestressed concrete 80+144+80	Vientiane–Boten railway Mekong	2021	Lat Han; 20°05′15.4″N 102°07′32.1″E	Oudomxay; Luang Prabang	
4	Pakse Bridge	ຂົວ ປາກເຊ	143 m (469 ft)	1,380 m (4,530 ft)	Extradosed; Concrete box girder deck, concrete pylons 102x9+123+143+91	National Road 16; Mekong	2000	Pakse–Phonthong District; 15°06′03.0″N 105°48′43.9″E	Champasak	
5	Second Myanmar–Lao Friendship Bridge	ຂົວມິດຕະພາບ ລາວ-ມຽນມາ	120 m (390 ft) (x3)	691 m (2,267 ft)	Truss; Steel	Mekong	2015	Xieng Kok–Kenglat; 20°52′15.0″N 100°32′31.1″E	Luang Namtha; Myanmar	
6	Pakbeng Bridge	ຂົວ ປາກແບ່ງ	120 m (390 ft)	379 m (1,243 ft)	Box girder Prestressed concrete 66+120+66	National Road 2W; Mekong	2015	Pakbeng; 19°50′37.0″N 101°03′57.4″E	Oudomxay; Sainyabuli	
7	Second Thai–Lao Friendship Bridge	ຂົວມິດຕະພາບ ລາວ-ໄທ ແຫ່ງທີສອງ	110 m (360 ft) (x4)	2,050 m (6,730 ft)	Box girder Concrete box girder deck, concrete pylons 2x110+5x80+2x110	Mekong	2006	Savannakhet–Mukdahan; 16°36′01.1″N 104°44′33.0″E	Savannakhet; Thailand	
8	Fourth Thai–Lao Friendship Bridge	ຂົວມິດຕະພາບ ລາວ-ໄທ ແຫ່ງທຳອິດ 4	110 m (360 ft) (x3)	630 m (2,070 ft)	Box girder Prestressed concrete 75+110x3+75	Asian Highway 3 Mekong	2013	Houayxay–Chiang Khong District; 20°12′50.1″N 100°27′14.1″E	Bokeo; Thailand	
9	Sekong Bridge		110 m (360 ft)	300 m (980 ft)	Extradosed; Concrete box girder deck, concrete pylons 80+110+65	National Road 16B; Sekong River	2018	Sekong; 15°20′27.4″N 106°43′57.5″E	Sekong	
10	First Thai–Lao Friendship Bridge	ຂົວມິດຕະພາບ ລາວ-ໄທ ແຫ່ງທຳອິດ	105 m (344 ft) (x5)	1,174 m (3,852 ft)	Box girder Prestressed concrete 70+105x5+70	Asian Highway 12; Mekong	1994	Vientiane–Nong Khai; 17°52′48.8″N 102°42′54.2″E	Vientiane Prefecture; Thailand	
11	Luang Prabang Railway Bridge		104 m (341 ft) (x4)	1,459 m (4,787 ft)	Box girder Prestressed concrete 60+104x4+60	Vientiane–Boten railway Mekong	2021	Luang Prabang; 19°56′01.0″N 102°12′21.6″E	Luang Prabang	
12	Sixth Thai–Lao Friendship Bridge project	ຂົວມິດຕະພາບ ລາວ-ໄທ ແຫ່ງທຳອິດ 6		1,020 m (3,350 ft)	Arch; Steel tied-arch	Mekong	2026	Lakhonepheng District–Na Tan District; 15°55′17.7″N 105°20′36.6″E	Salavan; Thailand	
13	Pakkhone-Thadeua Bridge	ຂົວນ້ຳຂອງ ທ່າເດື່ອ-ປາກຄອນ		620 m (2,030 ft)	Box girder Prestressed concrete	National Road 4 Mekong	2013	Pang Khom–Tha Deua; 19°25′33.7″N 101°50′51.8″E	Sainyabuli; Luang Prabang	
14	Paklay Bridge	ຂົວນ້ຳຂອງ ນາສັກ-ໂຄກເຂົ້າດໍ		365 m (1,198 ft)	Truss; Steel	Mekong	2017	Pak Lay; 18°10′33.3″N 101°23′35.4″E	Sainyabuli; Vientiane Province	
15	Cable Bridge (Dong, Laos)				Suspension; Steel pylons	National Road 909; Sepon River	1975	Dong; 16°37′32.4″N 106°25′07.0″E	Savannakhet	

== See also ==
- Transport in Laos
- Rail transport in Laos
- List of crossings of the Mekong River
- Geography of Laos
- List of rivers of Laos

== Notes and references ==
- Nicolas Janberg. "International Database for Civil and Structural Engineering". Structurae.com.
- Others references
