= Friendship Bridge =

Friendship Bridge may refer to:

== Bridges ==
=== Asia ===
- Afghanistan–Uzbekistan Friendship Bridge, over the Amu Darya River
- Amizade Bridge (Macau), between the Macau Peninsula and Taipa Island
- Armenia-Georgia Friendship bridge, between Sadakhlo and Bagratashen, over the Debed river
- Friendship Bridge (Shiwei) between Russia and Inner Mongolia at Shiwei, Inner Mongolia and Olochi, Russia, over the Argun River
- Korea–Russia Friendship Bridge, between Russia and North Korea
- Malaysia-Brunei Friendship Bridge, over the Pandaruan River
- Qatar–Bahrain Friendship Bridge, a planned bridge over the Gulf of Bahrain
- Sino-Korean Friendship Bridge, between China and North Korea over the Yalu River
- Sino-Nepal Friendship Bridge, between China and Nepal over the Sun Kosi River
- Tajik-Afghan Friendship Bridge, over the Panj River
- Youyi Bridge (the Chinese name for friendship), at Thakot, Pakistan, over the Indus River

==== Thailand ====
- Thai–Malaysia Friendship Bridge
  - Rantau Panjang–Sungai Golok Bridge (known in Thailand as the First Thai-Malayan Friendship Bridge), between Malaysia and Thailand over the Golok River
  - Bukit Bunga–Ban Buketa Bridge (known in Thailand as the Second Thai-Malayan Friendship Bridge), between Malaysia and Thailand over the Golok River
- Thai–Cambodia Friendship Bridge, see Cambodia–Thailand border § Temporary border crossing
- Thai–Lao Friendship Bridge
  - First Thai–Lao Friendship Bridge (opened in 1994), between Laos and Thailand over the Mekong River
  - Second Thai–Lao Friendship Bridge (opened in 2007), between Laos and Thailand over the Mekong River
  - Third Thai–Lao Friendship Bridge (opened in 2011), between Laos and Thailand over the Mekong River
  - Fourth Thai–Lao Friendship Bridge (opened in 2013), between Laos and Thailand over the Mekong River
  - Fifth Thai–Lao Friendship Bridge (opened in 2025), between Laos and Thailand over the Mekong River
  - Sixth Thai–Lao Friendship Bridge (under construction), between Laos and Thailand over the Mekong River in the Na Tan district
- Thai–Myanmar Friendship Bridge
  - Thai–Myanmar Friendship Bridge (opened 1997), over the Moei River
  - Second Thai–Myanmar Friendship Bridge (under construction), over the Moei River

==== Cross continental ====
- Suez Canal Bridge, also known as the Japan-Egypt Friendship Bridge

=== Europe ===
- Friendship Bridge (Germany-France), between Germany and France, the Saar River
- Friendship Bridge (Tartu), Tartu, Estonia
- Giurgiu-Ruse Friendship Bridge, between Bulgaria and Romania over the Danube River
- Friendship Bridge (Estonia-Russia), over the Narva River

=== Central and South America ===
- Friendship Bridge (Brazil–Paraguay), over the Paraná River
- Puente La Amistad de Taiwán, (Spanish for "Taiwan Friendship Bridge") over the Tempisque River in Costa Rica
- Wilson Pinheiro Binational Bridge, a bridge crossing the Acre River between Bolivia with Brazil whose Spanish (Bolivian) name translates as "Friendship Bridge"

== Other uses ==
- Friendship Bridge (non-profit), a non-profit organization in the United States

== See also ==
- Peace Bridge (disambiguation)
- Fraternity Bridge, linking Brazil and Argentina
- Unity Bridge across Ruvuma River between Tanzania and Mozambique
