= Thai–Lao Friendship Bridge =

There are five bridges named Thai–Lao Friendship Bridge, and a sixth being under construction

- First Thai–Lao Friendship Bridge (opened in 1994), between Nong Khai and Vientiane
- Second Thai–Lao Friendship Bridge (opened in 2007), between Mukdahan and Savannakhet
- Third Thai–Lao Friendship Bridge (opened in 2011), between Nakhon Phanom Province and Thakhek, Khammouane Province
- Fourth Thai–Lao Friendship Bridge (opened in 2013), between Chiang Khong District, Chiang Rai Province and Houayxay District, Bokeo Province
- Fifth Thai–Lao Friendship Bridge (opened in 2025), between Bueng Kan Province and Pakxan town, Bolikhamxai Province
- Sixth Thai–Lao Friendship Bridge (under construction), between Na Tan District, Ubon Ratchathani Province and Lakhonepheng District, Salavan Province
