= List of crossings of the Mekong River =

The following is a list of crossings of the Mekong River. The Mekong is a river in Southeast Asia. It is the world's 12th-longest river and the 7th-longest in Asia. From the Tibetan Plateau, this river runs through China's Yunnan province, Myanmar, Laos, Thailand, Cambodia, and Vietnam.

== China ==
- Baoshan-Dali Railway Bridge (under construction)
- New Jinghong Bridge, Yunnan (G214)
- Old Jinghong Bridge, Yunnan
- Jinghong Dam Bridge, Yunnan
- Lancang to Simao Bridge (S309), Yunnan
- Lincang to Jinggu Bridge (G323), Yunnan
- Dachaoshan Dam Bridge, Yunnan
- Manwan Bridge (G214 Old Route), Yunnan
- Lincang to Dali Bridge (G214 New Route), Yunnan
- Fengqing to Lushi Bridge, Yunnan
- Changning to Goujie Bridge, Yunnan
- Baoshan to Dali Expressway (G56), Yunnan
- Old Baoshan to Dali Bridge (G320), Yunnan
- County Road X088, Yunnan
- Tianbaxin Bridge, Yunnan
- Jizhou Bridge, Yunnan
- Luqiang Bridge, Yunnan
- Biaocun Bridge, Yunnan
- Shangsongping Bridge, Yunnan
- Hetaoping Bridge, Yunnan
- Tu’e Bridge, Yunnan
- Atadeng Bridge, Yunnan
- Provincial Highway S311 Bridge, Yunnan
- Zhongcun Bridge, Yunnan
- Jinman Bridge, Yunnan
- Yingpan Bridge, Yunnan
- County Road Q20 Bridge, Yunnan
- Wendeng Bridge, Yunnan
- Qingmenkou Bridge, Yunnan
- Lazhuhe Bridge, Yunnan
- Baishiping Bridge, Yunnan
- Zhongpai Bridge, Yunnan
- Weida Bridge, Yunnan
- Qiqi Bridge, Yunnan
- Fuchuan Bridge, Yunnan
- Zhonglu Bridge, Yunnan
- Jigetu Bridge, Yunnan
- Gongle Bridge, Yunnan
- Xialuoga Bridge, Yunnan
- Nuoge Bridge, Yunnan
- Gongchang Bridge, Yunnan
- Zhuangfang Bridge, Yunnan
- Muzuoluo Bridge, Yunnan
- Diziluo Bridge, Yunnan
- Kangpu Bridge, Yunnan
- Yezhi Bridge, Yunnan
- Geding Bridge, Yunnan
- Bading Bridge, Yunnan
- Badi Bridge, Yunnan
- Badi Dam Bridge, Yunnan
- Achidaga Bridge, Yunnan
- Cizhong Bridge, Yunnan
- Yanmen Bridge, Yunnan
- Yeka Bridge, Yunnan
- Yongzhi Bridge, Yunnan
- Siyonggu Bridge, Yunnan
- Ninong Bridge, Yunnan
- Mingyong Bridge, Yunnan
- Yunnan-Tibet Highway Bridge 1 (G214), Yunnan
- Yunnan-Tibet Highway Bridge 2 (G214), Yunnan
- Adong Bridge, Tibet
- Chuba Bridge, Tibet
- Muxu Bridge, Tibet
- Ride Bridge, Tibet
- Suxue Bridge, Tibet
- Leding Bridge, Tibet
- Dingxue Bridge, Tibet
- Sichuan-Tibet Highway Old Bridge, Tibet
- Sichuan-Tibet Highway New Bridge (G318), Tibet

== Myanmar/Laos ==
=== Kenglat, Shan/Xieng Kok, Luang Namtha ===
- Myanmar–Lao Friendship Bridge

== Laos ==
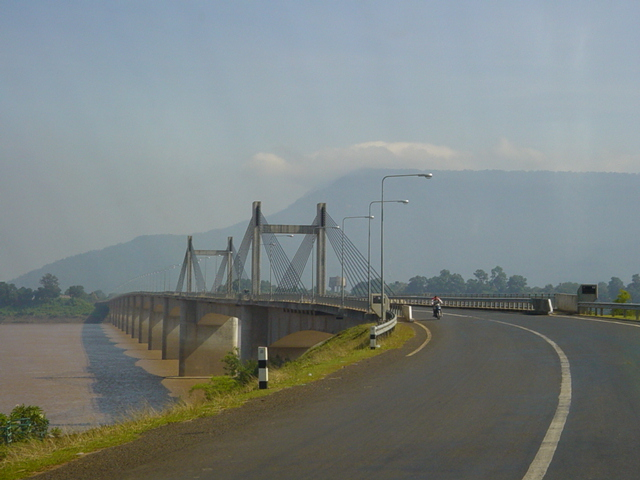
Lao-Nippon Bridge

=== Sainyabuli-Luang Prabang ===
- Pakkhone-Thadeua Bridge

=== Oudomxay-Sainyabuli ===
- Muang Ngeun-Pak Beng Bridge

=== Sainyabuli-Vientiane Province ===
- Pak Lay Bridge

=== Pakse-Champasak Province ===
- Lao-Nippon Bridge (Pakse Bridge)

=== Si Phan Don-Champasak Province ===
- Muang Khong Bridge
- Don Det–Don Khon railway Bridge

== Thailand/Laos ==
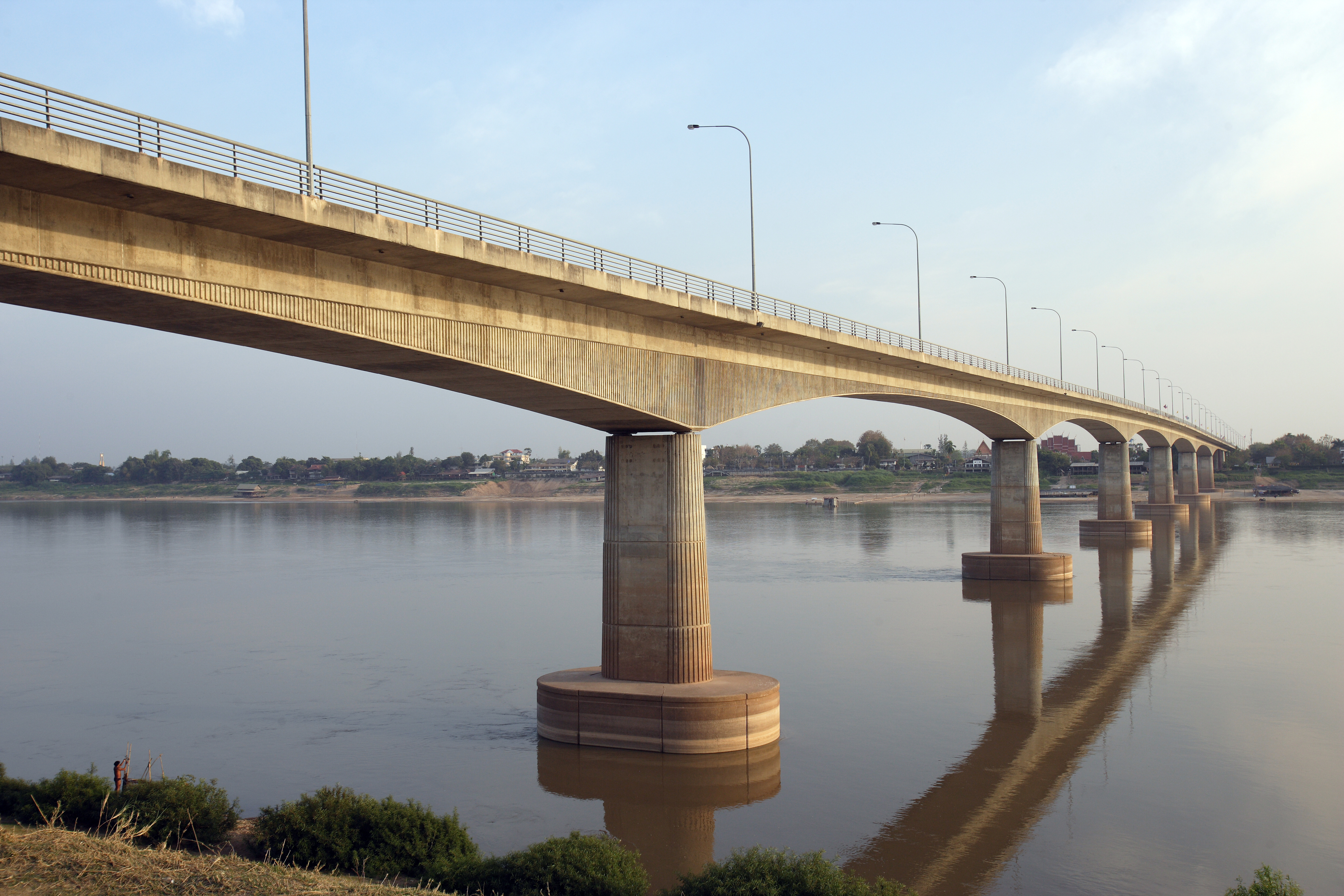
The First Thai–Lao Friendship Bridge, built with Australian funding and completed and opened in 1994, connecting Thailand and Laos across the Mekong River

=== Nong Khai/Vientiane Prefecture ===
- First Thai–Lao Friendship Bridge

=== Mukdahan/Savannakhet ===
- Second Thai–Lao Friendship Bridge

=== Nakhon Phanom/Thakhek ===
- Third Thai–Lao Friendship Bridge

=== Chiang Khong/Ban Houayxay ===
- Fourth Thai–Lao Friendship Bridge

=== Bung Kan/Bolikhamsai ===
- Fifth Thai–Lao Friendship Bridge

=== Ubon Ratchathani/Salavan ===
- Sixth Thai–Lao Friendship Bridge

=== Loei/Vientiane ===
- Seventh Thai–Lao Friendship Bridge

== Cambodia ==
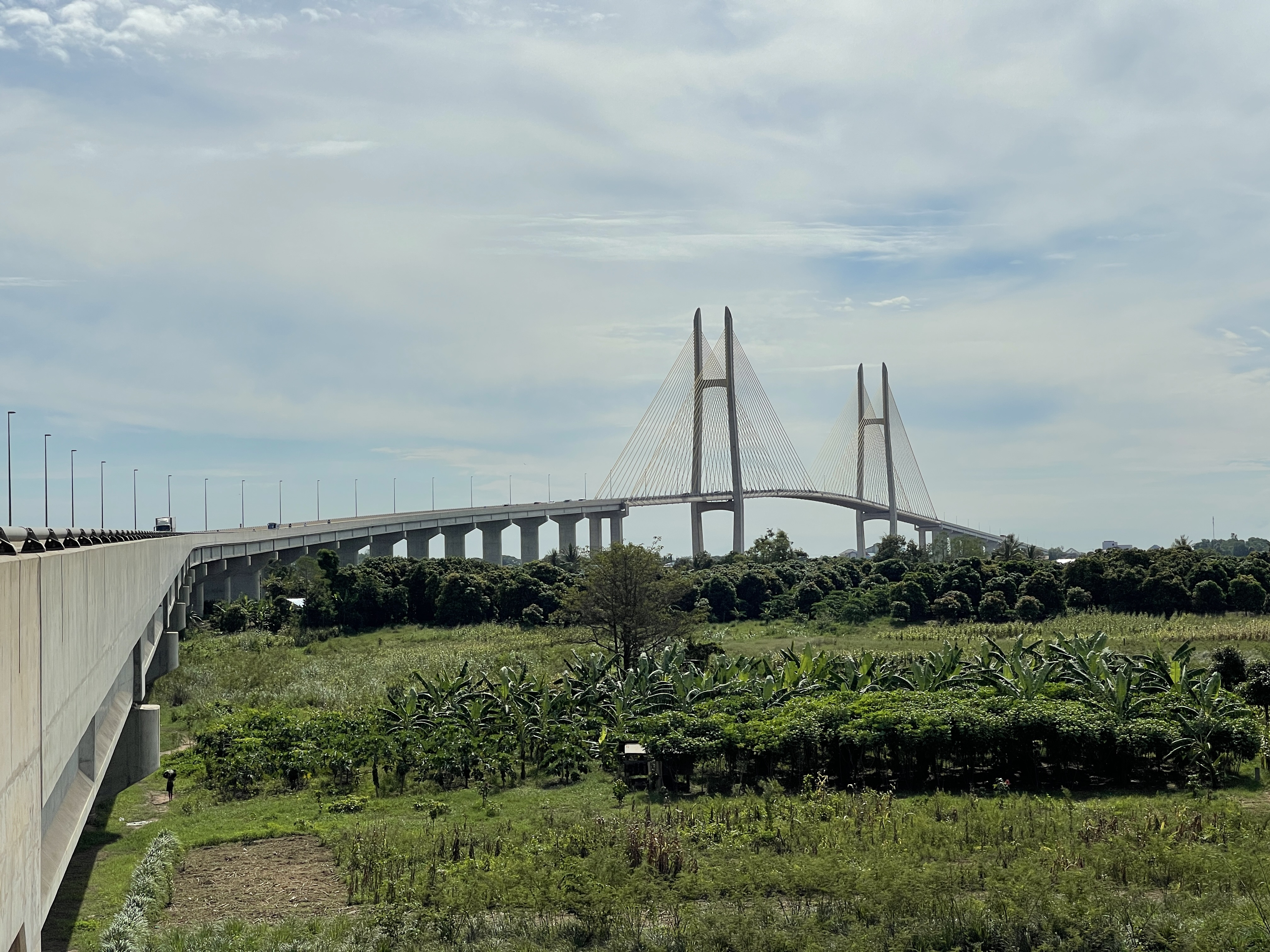
Neak Loeung Bridge

=== Stung Treng ===
- Stung Treng Bridge (Mekong River)
- Sekong Bridge (Tonle Sekong River)

=== Kratié ===
- Kratié Bridge

=== Kampong Cham ===
- Kizuna Bridge

=== Kandal ===
- Prek Tamak Bridge

=== Phnom Penh ===
- Monivong Bridge (Bassac River)

=== Kandal - Phnom Penh ===
- Takhmao Bridge (Bassac River)

=== Kandal - Prey Veng ===
- Neak Loeung Bridge (Tsubasa Bridge)

== Vietnam ==
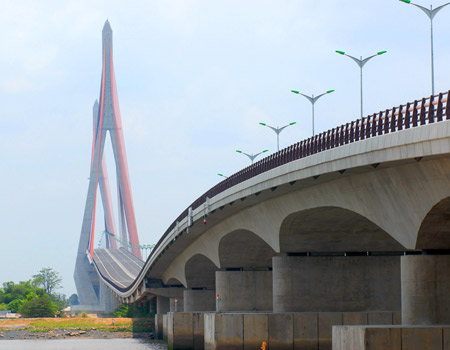
Cầu Cần Thơ Bridge

- Mỹ Thuận Bridge (Tiền Giang Province - Vĩnh Long Province)
- Rạch Miễu Bridge (Tiền Giang Province - Bến Tre Province)
- Hàm Luông Bridge (Bến Tre Province)
- Cổ Chiên Bridge (Bến Tre province Province - Trà Vinh Province)
- Cao Lãnh Bridge (Đồng Tháp Province)
- Vàm Cống Bridge (Đồng Tháp Province - Cần Thơ City)
- Cần Thơ Bridge (Vĩnh Long Province - Cần Thơ City)
- Châu Đốc Bridge (An Giang Province)
