= Peace Bridge (disambiguation) =

Peace Bridge is a bridge over the Niagara River, linking Canada and the United States.

Peace Bridge may also refer to:

Bridges:

- Peace Bridge (Calgary), a pedestrian bridge crossing the Bow River in Calgary, Alberta, Canada
- Peace Bridge (Foyle), a bridge in Derry, County Londonderry, Northern Ireland, built as part of the City of Culture 2013 project
- Peace Bridge (Mongolia), a bridge in the center of Ulaanbaatar, Mongolia
- Bridge of Peace, a pedestrian bridge in Tbilisi, Georgia
- Passerelle de la Paix (Peace Bridge), a pedestrian bridge in Lyon, France
- Senator George Mitchell Peace Bridge, informally called the Peace Bridge, between Counties Fermanagh and Cavan on the Ireland - United Kingdom border
- Bering Strait bridge, a proposed bridge across the Bering Strait also named "The Intercontinental Peace Bridge"

Other:

- Peace Bridge (album), a 2007 album by John & Mary
