= Wiang Chiang Khong =

- town
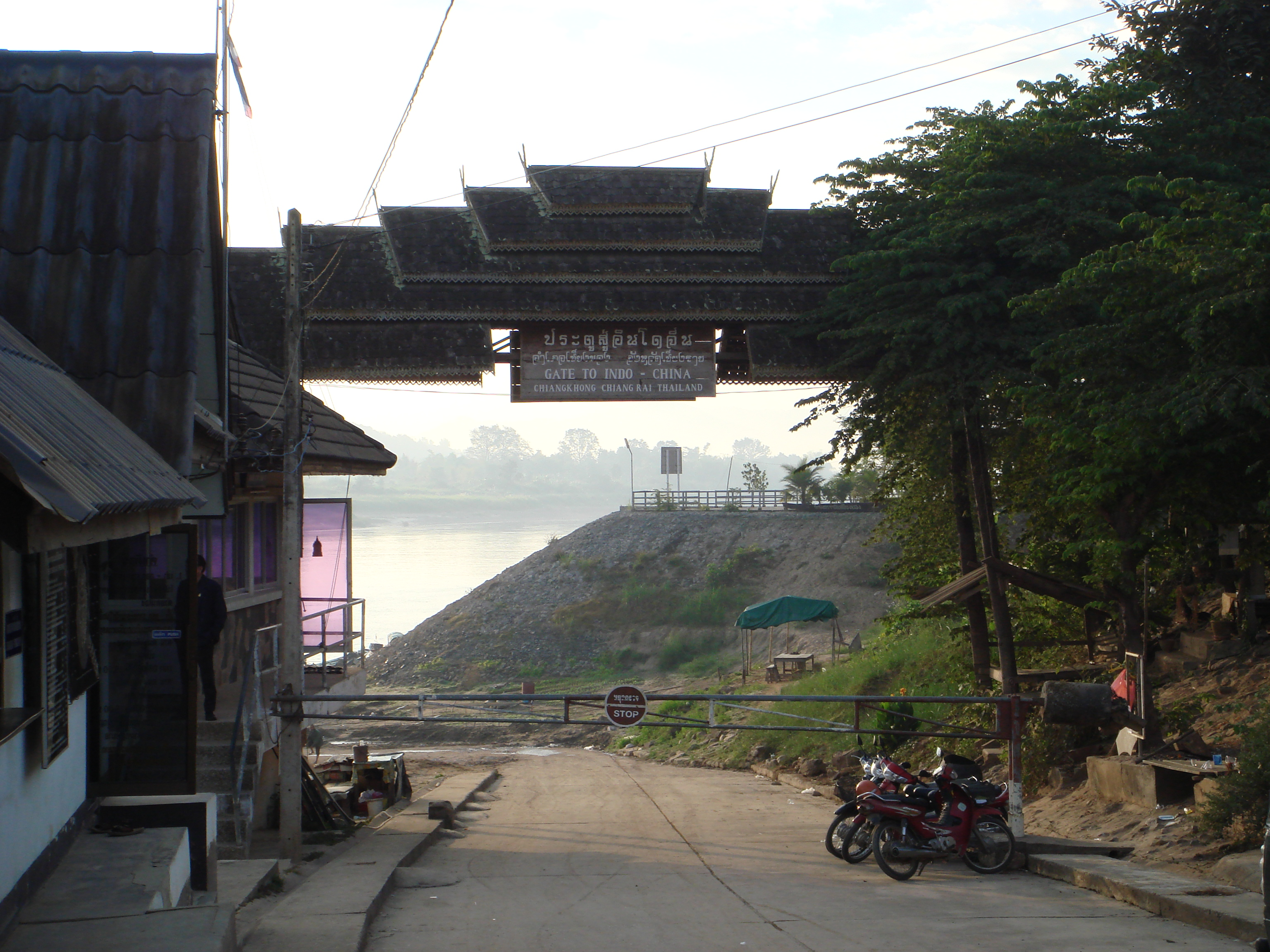
- Thai-Lao border crossing, Chiang Khong
- Interactive map of Wiang Chiang Khong
- Coordinates: 20.26125°N 100.40461°E

Population
  - Total: 14,505

Wiang Chiang Khong (Thai: เวียงเชียงของ, pronounced [wīa̯ŋ t͡ɕʰīa̯ŋ kʰɔ̌ːŋ]) is a small town (thesaban tambon) on the Mekong River in the northeast of Chiang Rai Province, Thailand, the central town of Chiang Khong District. It is the northernmost border crossing of the country into Laos (with Houayxay on the opposite shore of the Mekong). As of 2005 the town had a population of 4,342 and covers an area of 1.80 km^{2}.

== Photo gallery ==
Border crossing into Laos

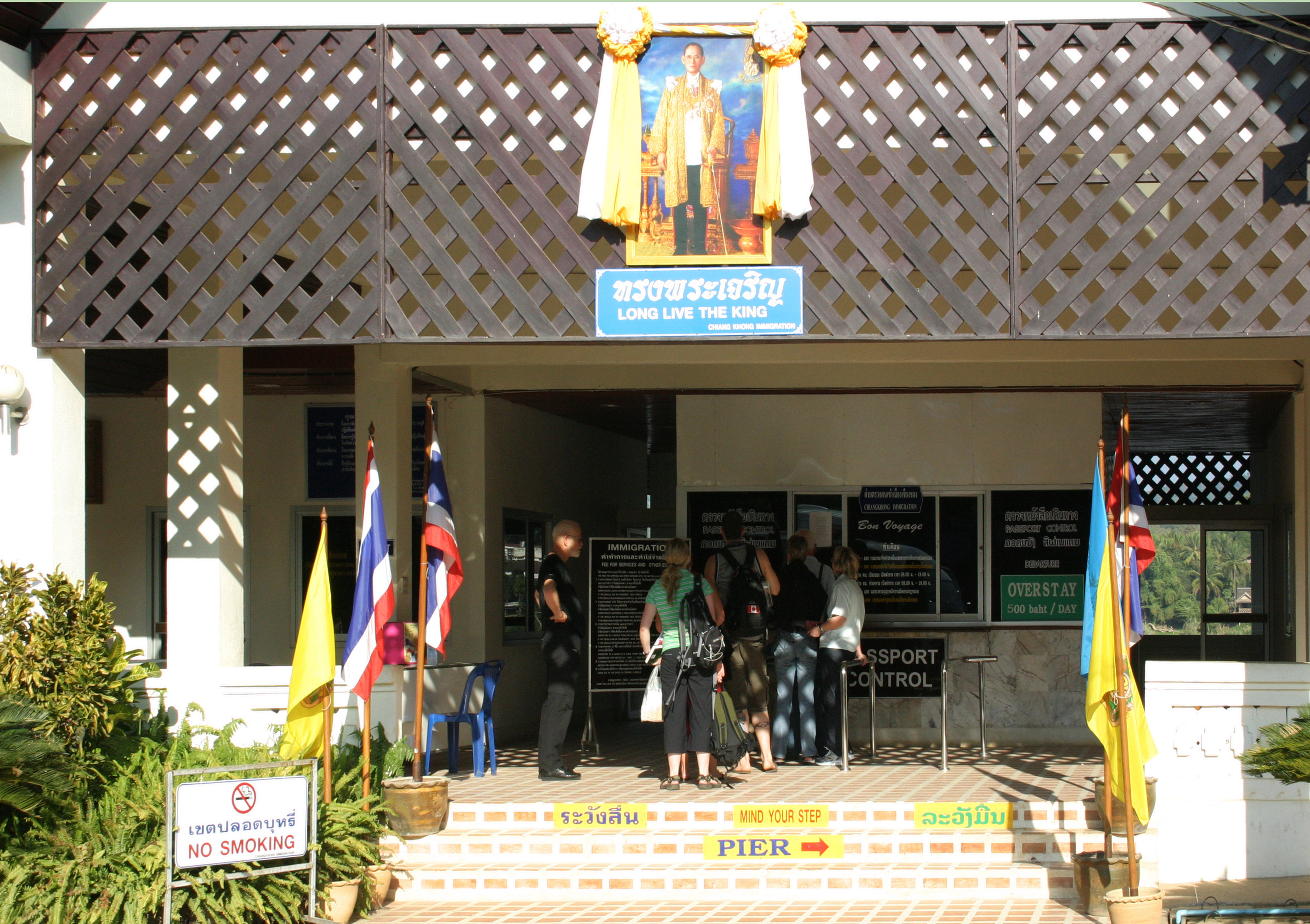

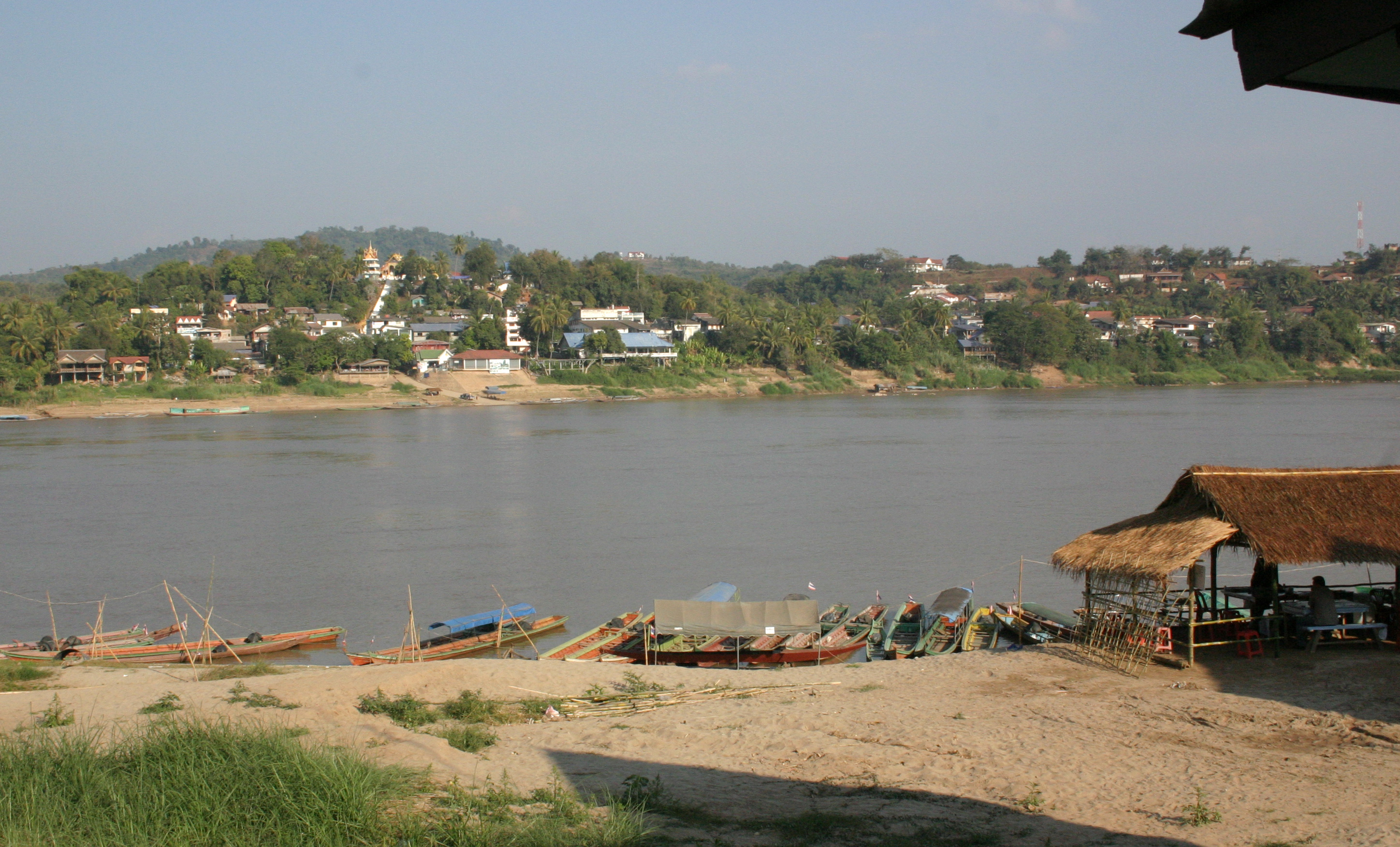

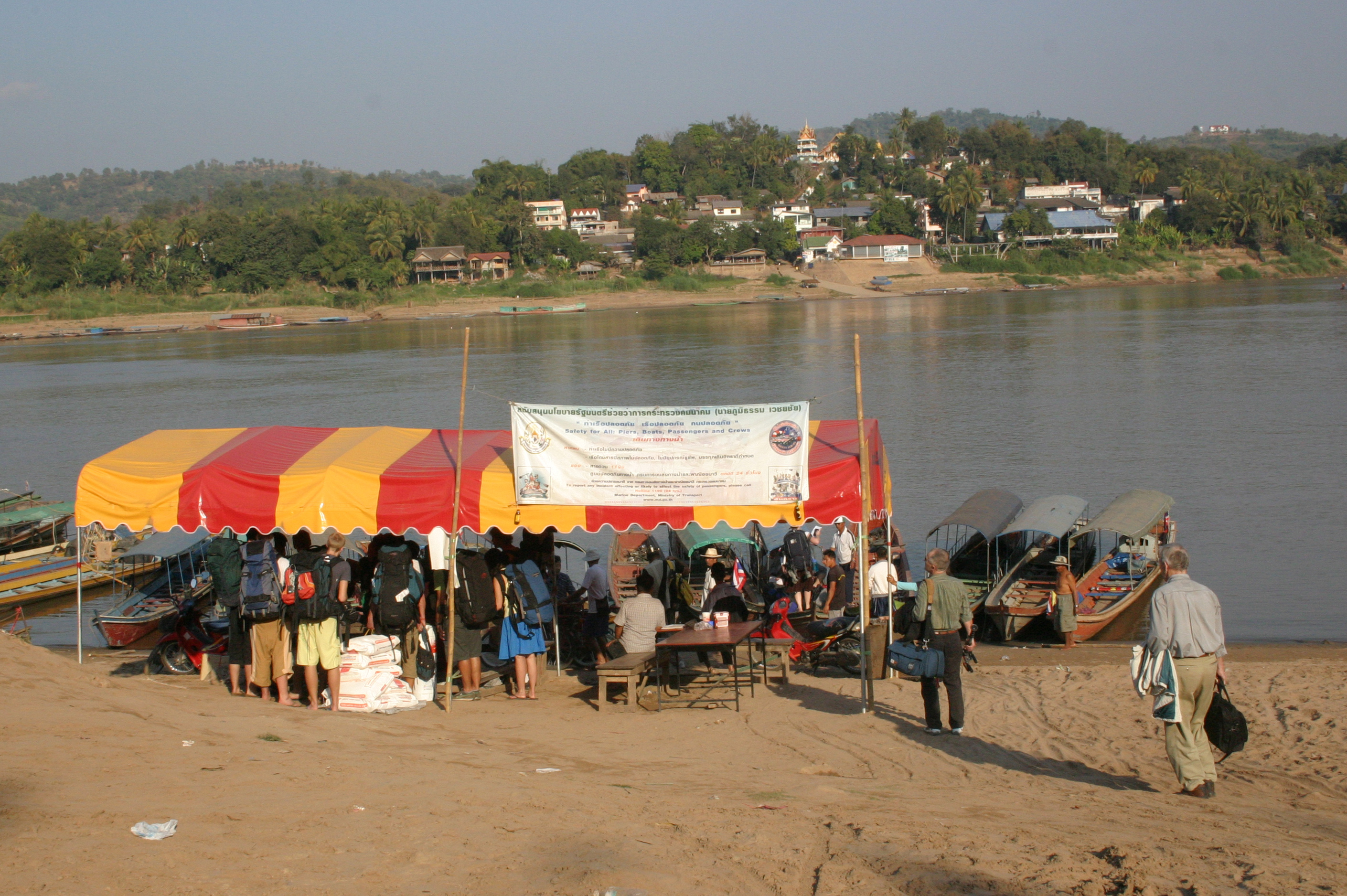

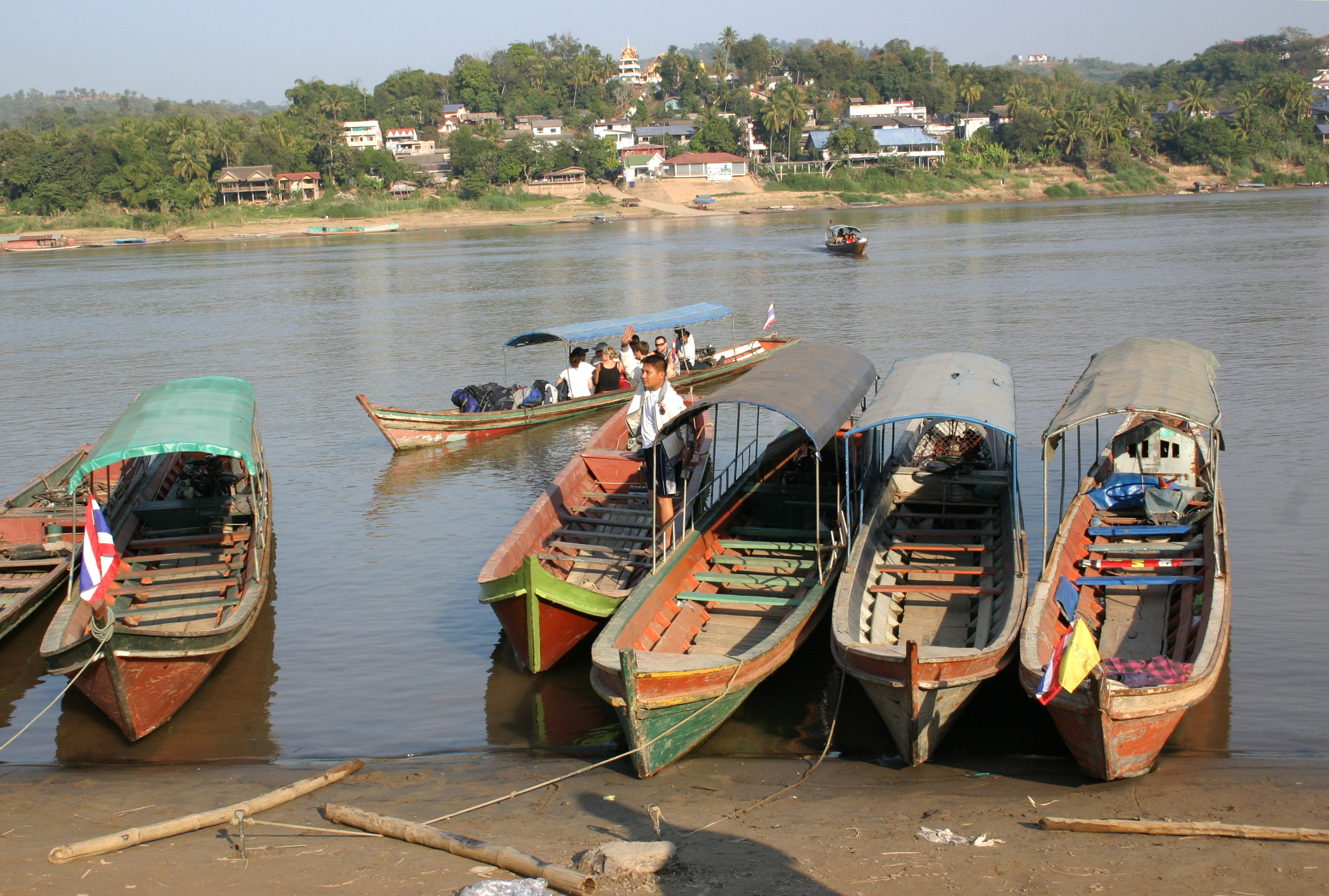

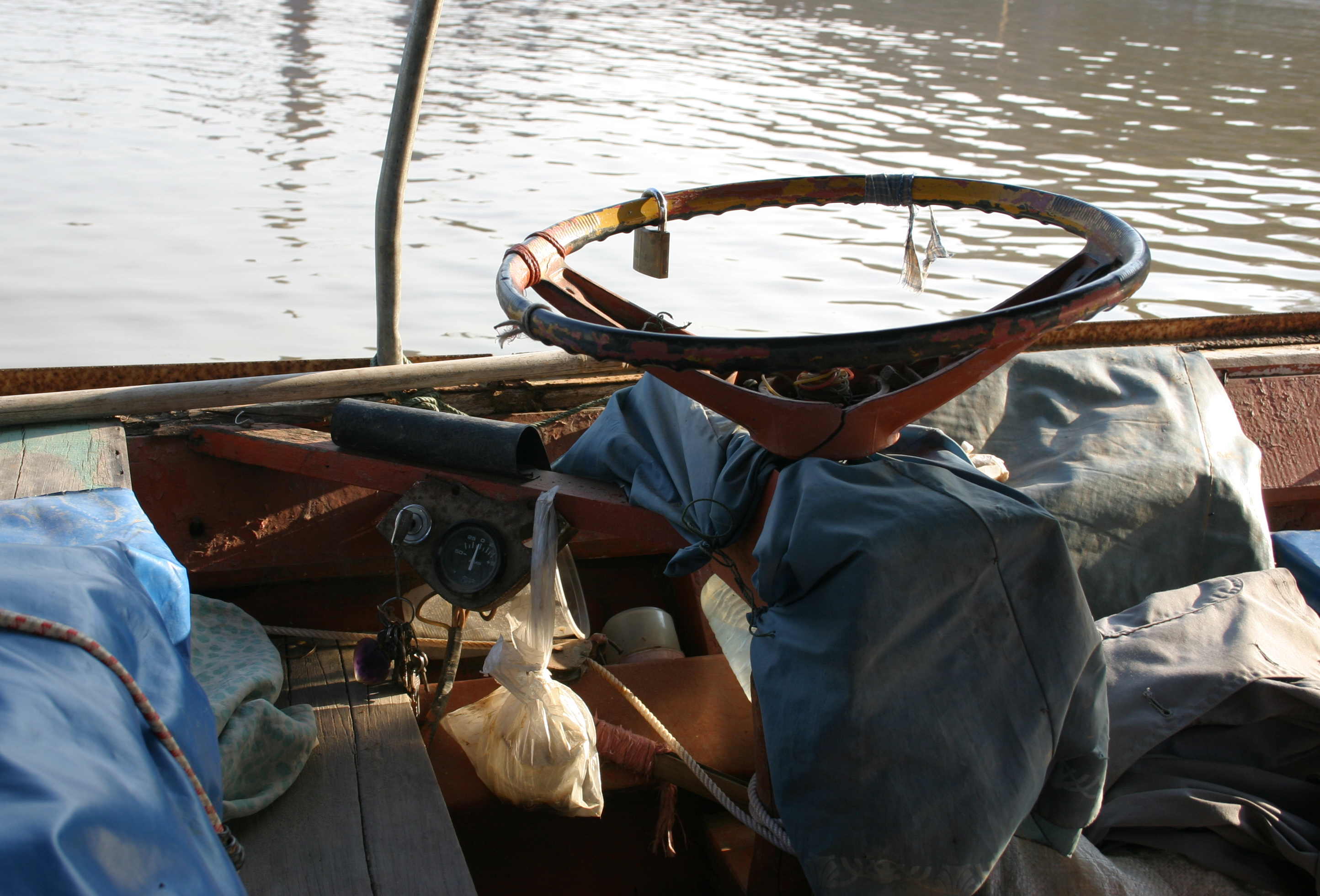

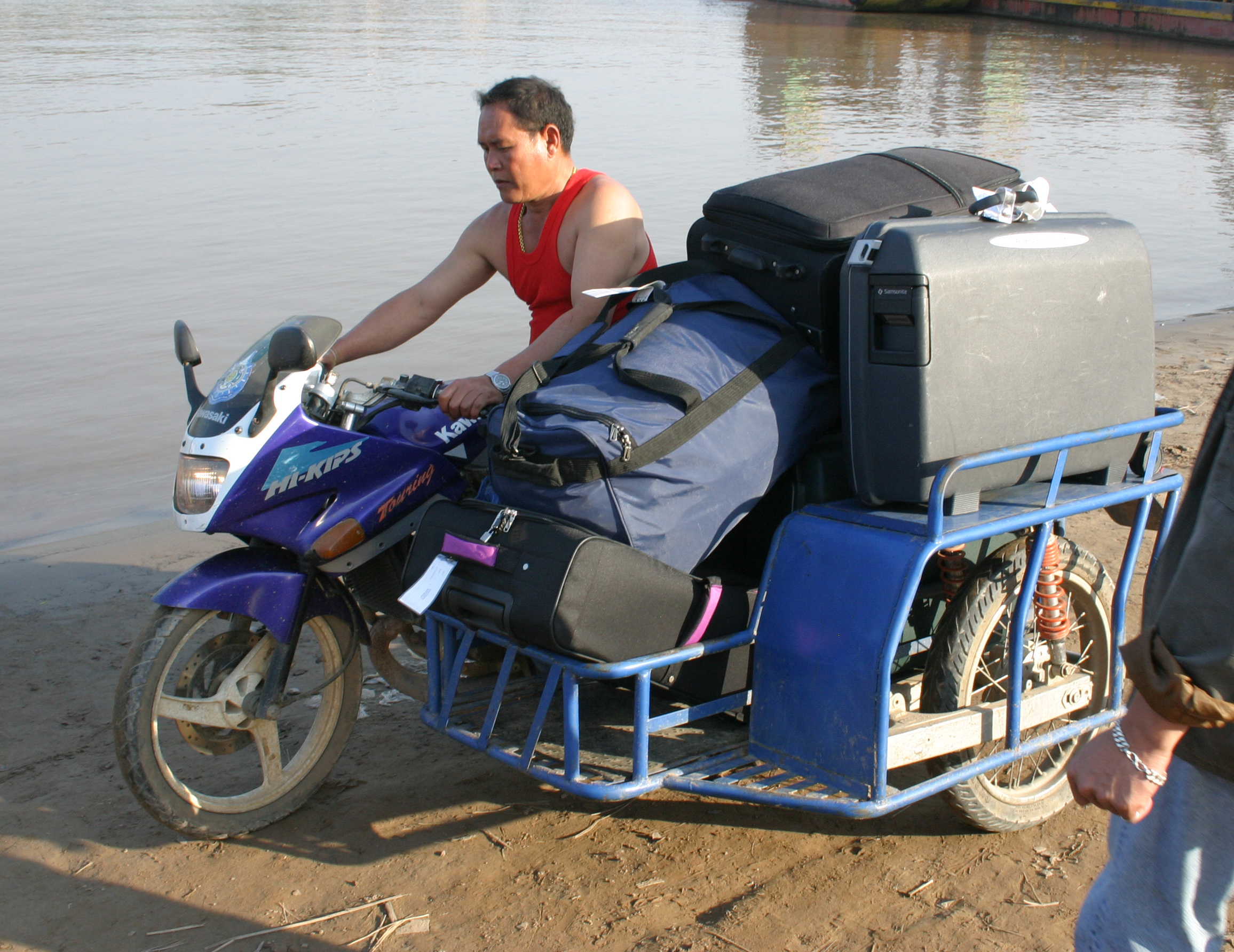
