= Transport in Laos =

Transportation networks and infrastructure in Laos

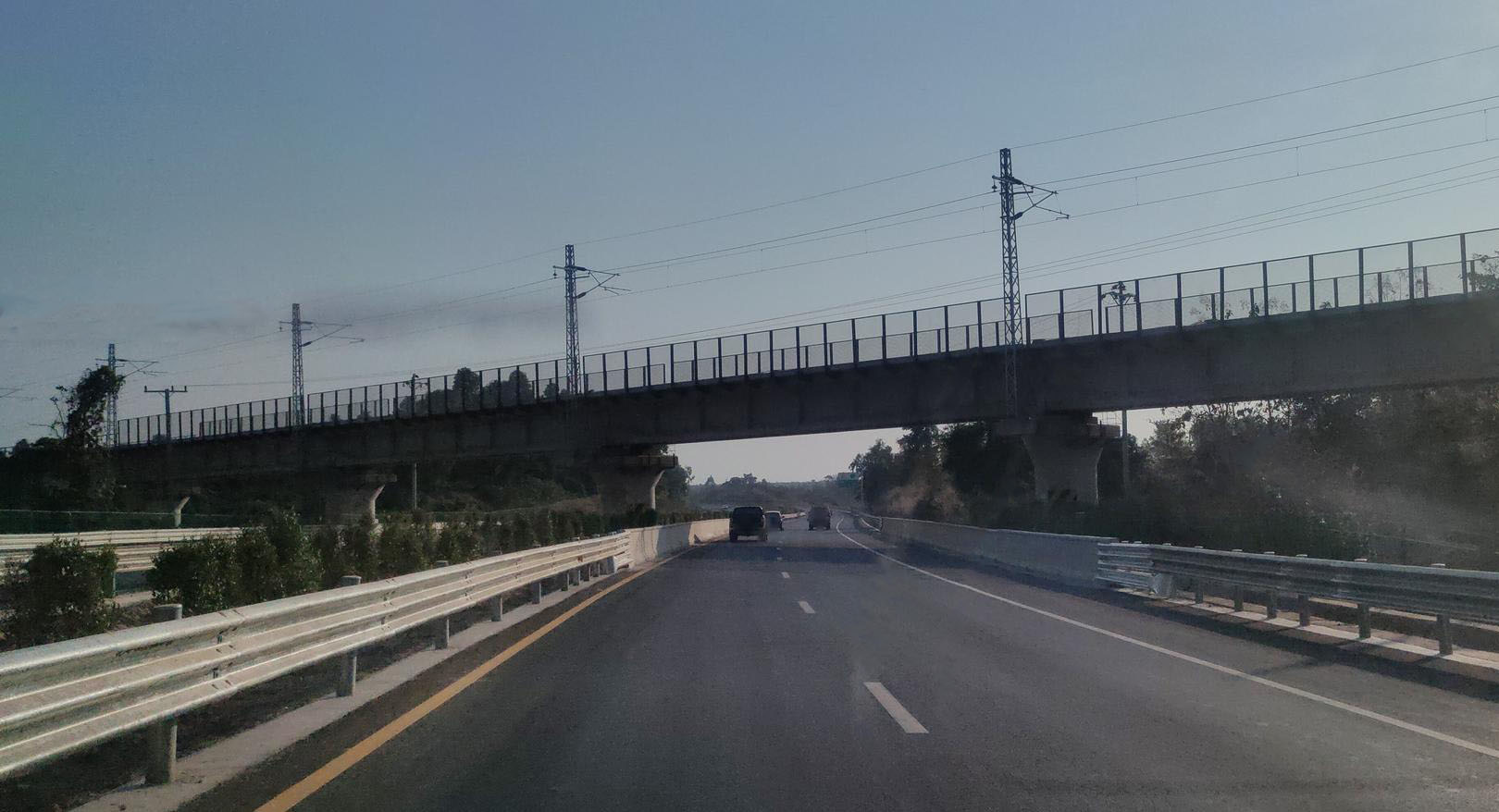
Boten–Vientiane railway crossing Vientiane–Boten Expressway

Transportation in Laos consists of road, rail, air, and inland water networks.

== Rail ==
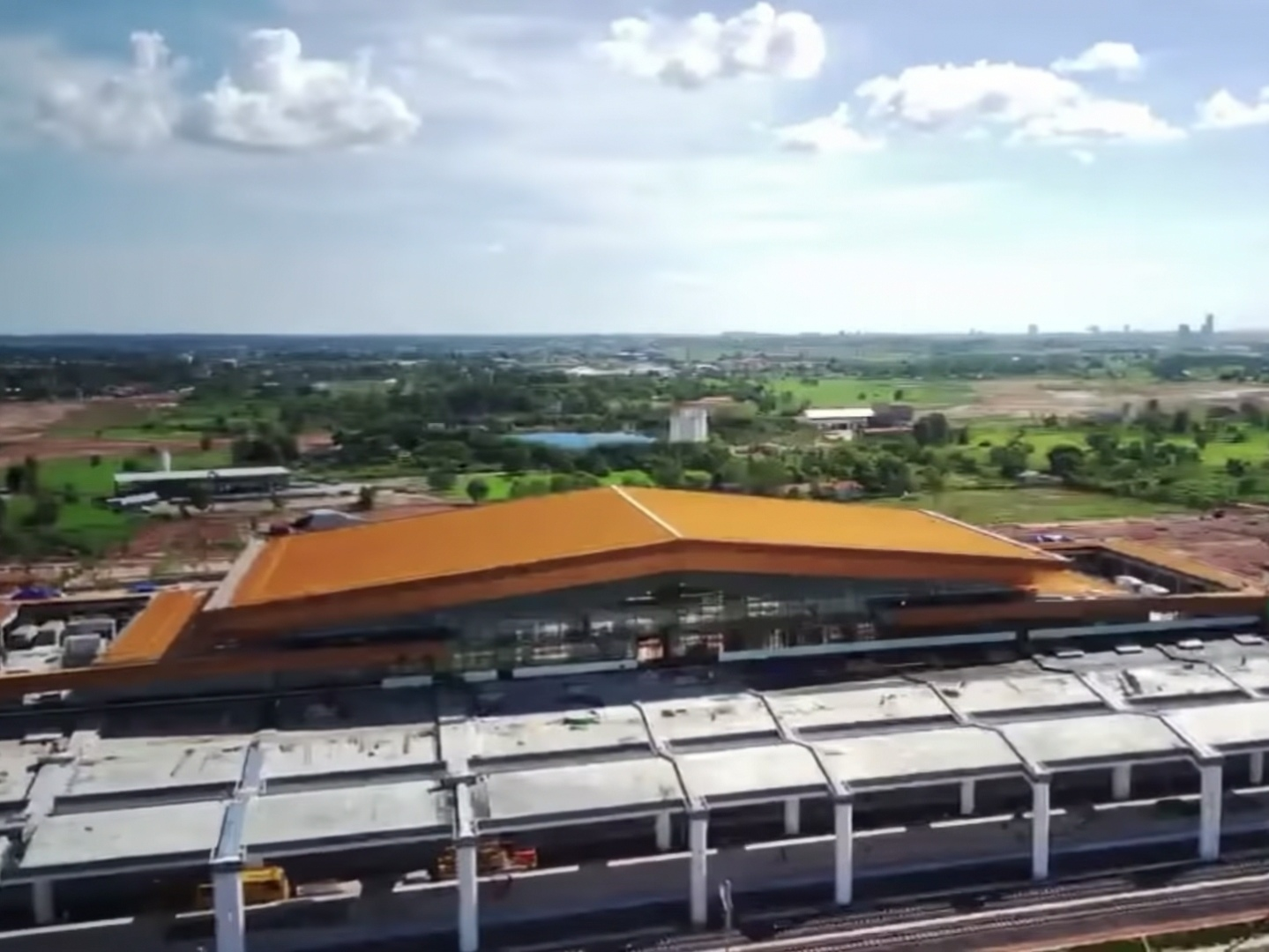
Vientiane station

The 2021 completion of the Boten–Vientiane railway, the Lao section of the Laos–China Railway (LCR), connects Vientiane to Kunming. The railway has transported more than 500,000 passengers from 115 countries and regions since passenger service was launched in April 2023; China doubled cross-border passenger train services in 2025.

== Buses ==
Central Bus Station networks are mostly operates within the Vientiane Prefecture. The state-owned Vientiane Capital State Bus Enterprise operates standard city bus services connecting the Central Bus Station located near the Talat Sao to outlying districts, tourist sites like Buddha Park, and main transport routes including Wattay International Airport, Khamsavath railway station and Vientiane railway stations.

=== Vientiane Bus Rapid Transit ===
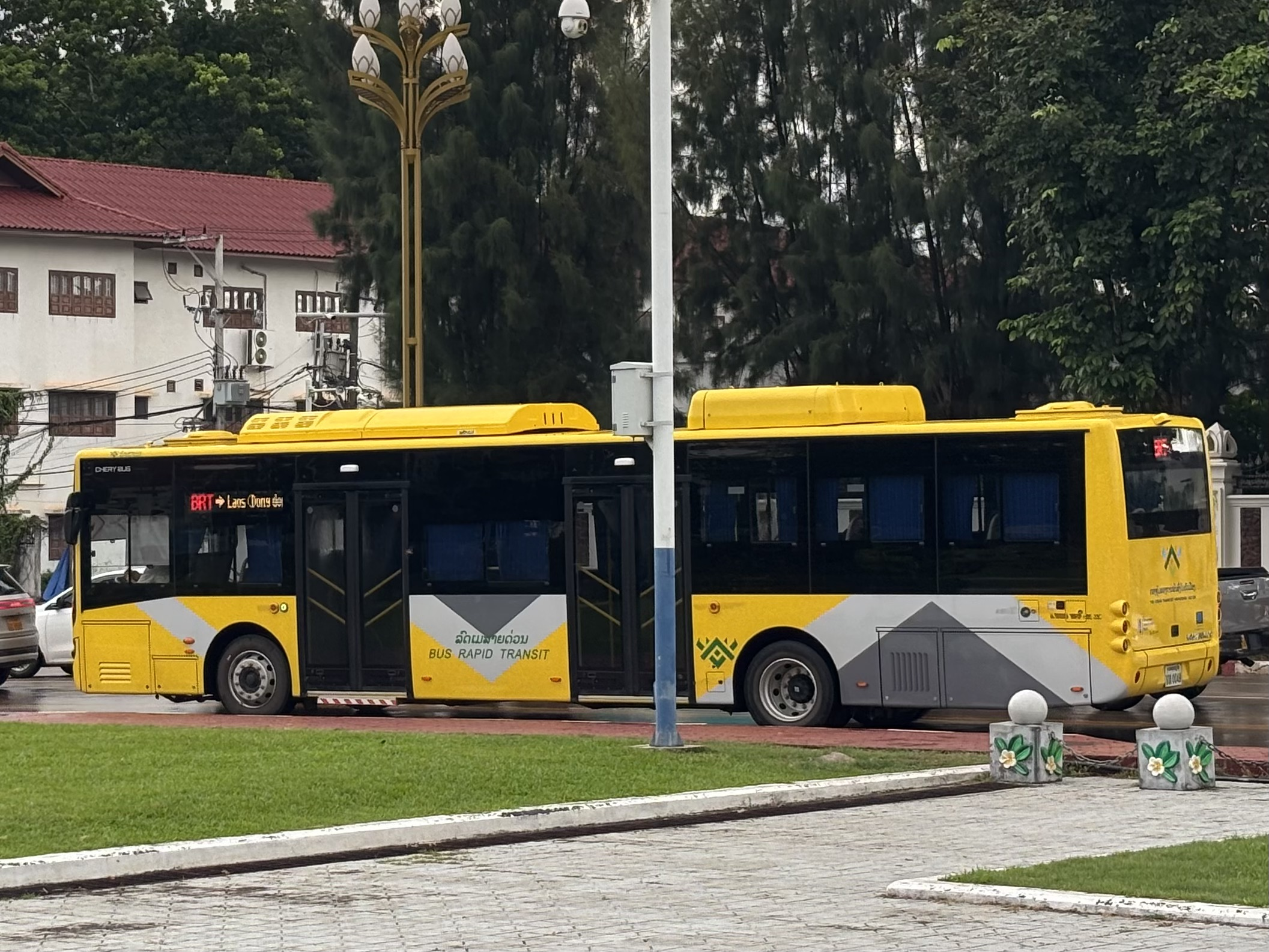
Vientiane BRT Bus

The Vientiane Bus Rapid Transit (BRT) is the first modern electric mass transit system in Laos. It is developed under the Vientiane Sustainable Urban Transport Project, it is designed to bypass city traffic with dedicated lanes and automated traffic-light signaling.

Vientiane BRT system operates with 19 to 27 stations which the first line starts at National University of Laos (Dongdok) Station and runs directly down to the Morning Market Station (Talat Sao) passing through 19 stations including Xangkhou, Saphangmeuk, Phongsavanh Bank, SOS School, Kaysone Phomvihane Museum, ICTC Center, Phonkheng, Patuxay, and Wat Thatfoun.

== Highways ==
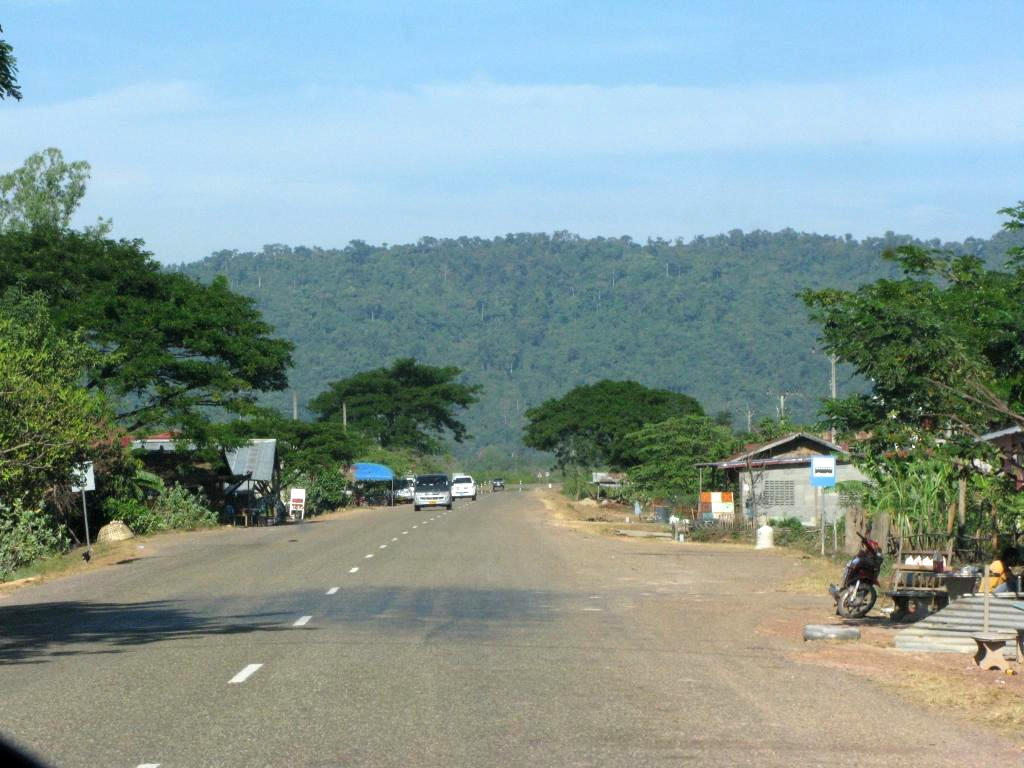
National Road 13 South

In Laos, there are 59,963 kilometres (37,259 mi) of roadway, with 1.45% paved with concrete, 12.03% with asphalt concrete and 75.77% with double bituminous surface treatment and 10.75% with gravel road. Right-hand traffic (RHT) is observed in Laos.

Laos constructed a highway in 2007 connecting Savannakhet to the Vietnamese border at Lao Bao, with funding from the Japanese government.

Laos is connected across the Mekong River to Thailand by First and Second Thai-Lao Friendship Bridges. Vientiane is linked to Nong Khai by the First Friendship Bridge. The Third Thai-Lao Friendship Bridge began construction in March 2009 linking Nakhon Phanom Province in northeastern Thailand and Khammouane Province in Laos. It was completed on 11 November 2011.

=== Expressway ===
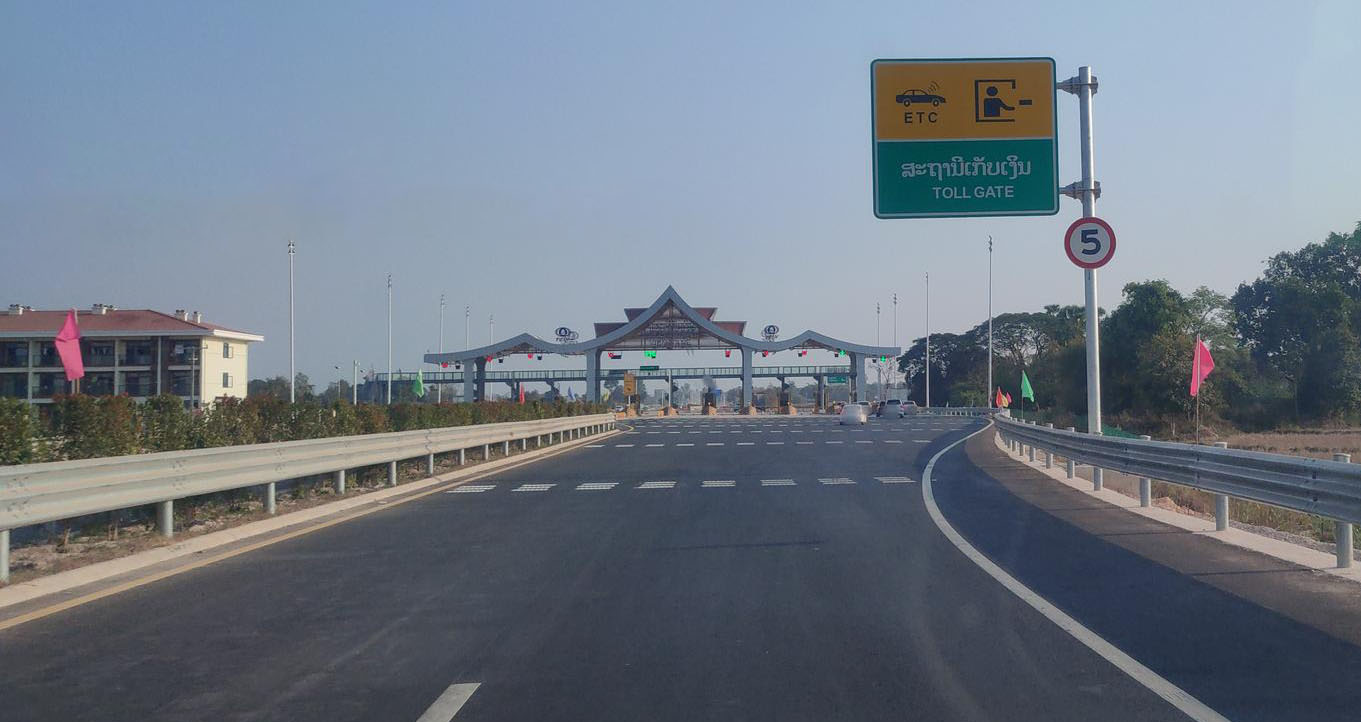
Vientiane toll station of the Vientiane–Boten Expressway

On 20 December 2020, the Vientiane–Vang Vieng Expressway, the first expressway in Laos, was completed. Construction began at the end of 2018 and was initially scheduled to finish in 2021. The road, which includes twin tunnels almost 900 metres long through Phoupha Mountain, shortens the route by 43 km as compared with the existing Route No 13. The expressway toll is 550 kip per kilometre, or about 62,000 kip for a one-way trip between Vientiane and Vang Vieng. The Vientiane-Vang Vieng expressway is the first section of a planned expressway from Vientiane through the northern provinces to Boten in Luang Namtha Province, which borders China.

== Water ==
About 4,600 kilometres (2,900 mi) of navigable water routes exist in Laos, primarily the Mekong and its tributaries. There are an additional 2,900 kilometres (1,800 mi) of water routes, which is sectionally navigable by craft drawing less than 0.5 metres (1 ft 8 in).

Laos has an ocean-going merchant marine that consisted of one cargo ship of 2,370 gross tonnage (GT) in 2004, and still consisted of one ship in 2023.

== Pipelines ==
Laos has 136 kilometres (85 mi) of pipelines for the transport of petroleum products.

== Limits ==
Inaccessibility has historically limited the ability of governments to maintain a presence in some areas and has limited interchange and communication among villages and ethnic groups.

Travel may be done by ox-cart over level terrain or by foot. The steep mountains and lack of roads have caused upland ethnic groups to rely entirely on pack baskets and horse packing for transportation.

There are projects to develop transport networks.
