= Youyi Bridge =

Bridge in Khyber Pakhtunkhwa, Pakistan

Coordinates: 34°48′14.4″N 72°56′10.94″E

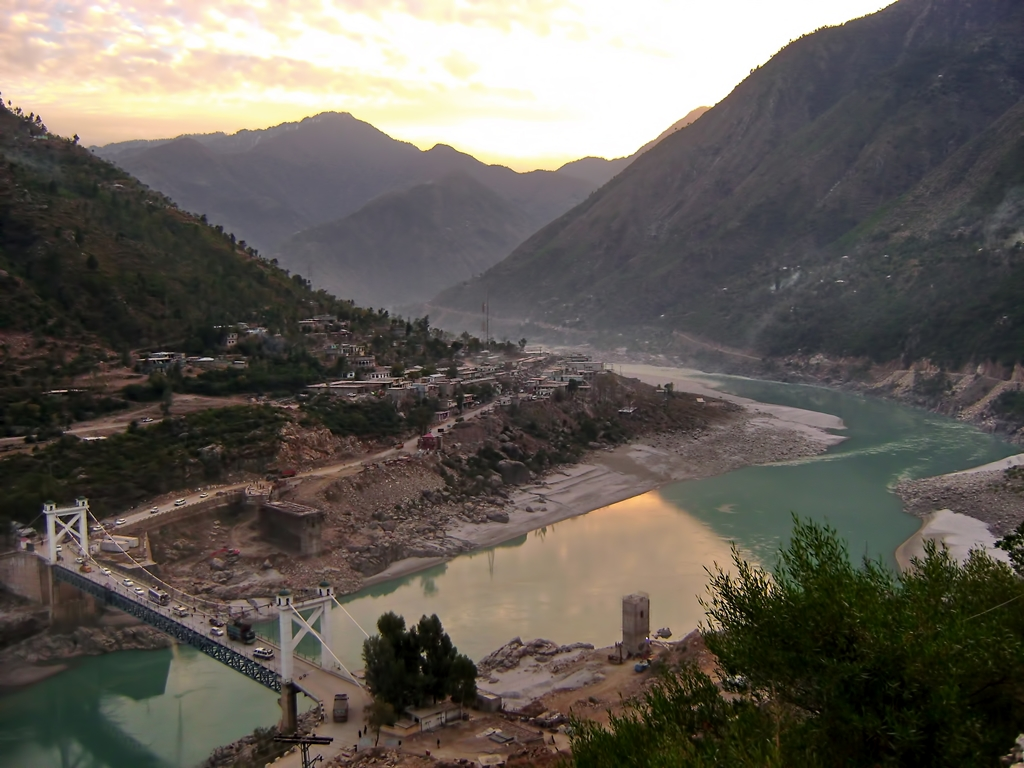
Youyi Bridge

The Youyi Bridge (Chinese: 友誼橋, meaning Friendship Bridge, Urdu: پل دوستی) is a bridge on the Karakoram Highway (KKH) at Thakot in Battagram District in Khyber Pakhtunkhwa province of Pakistan. The inauguration ceremony for the bridge was held on August 17, 2004.

The bridge spans the Indus River and carries the KKH, next to a bridge built between 1966 and 1978. The bridge was given its Chinese name in 2004 to honour the Chinese and Pakistani workers killed in the construction of the Karakoram Highway.

== See also ==
- Hazara region
