= Peace Bridge (Mongolia) =

Bridge in Ulaanbaatar, Mongolia

Peace Bridge Энхтайваны гүүр
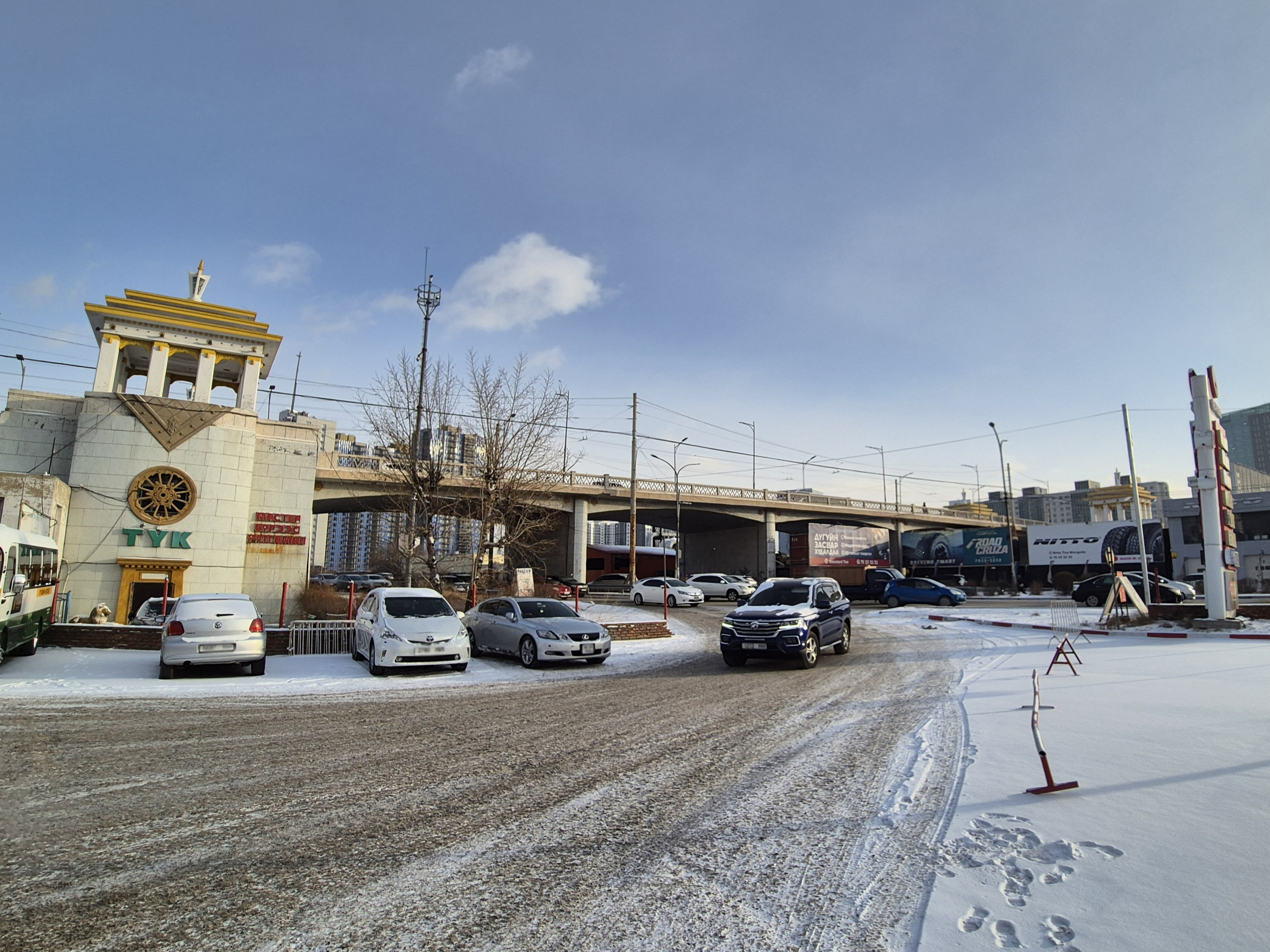
- Coordinates: 47.9076°N 106.9129°E
- Locale: Ulaanbaatar, Mongolia

Characteristics
- Total length: 379 m

History
- Construction start: 1958
- Construction end: 1963

Location
- Interactive map of Peace Bridge

Peace Bridge (Mongolian: Энхтайваны гүүр) is a bridge in the city centre of Ulaanbaatar, Mongolia, with technical and financial assistance from China.

== History ==
The construction of the bridge began in 1958 and was completed in 1963.

The bridge has undergone three major repairs. In 2004 and 2006, with Chinese support, the beams and columns were reinforced, and the supports and road surface were renewed.

Repairs was carried out in 2021. For 900 million tugriks, about three centimeters of old asphalt were removed on an area of 7,200 square meters, new pavement was laid, and lighting was restored. It was also planned to upgrade 1,400 square meters of pedestrian paths, but some of the repairs remained unfinished due to quarantine restrictions.

== Technical specifications ==
The bridge has a length of 379 meters. The bridge is designed to support a load of 15 tons. By 2026, the bridge is in critical condition.
