= Sekong Bridge =

Cambodian bridge

- Coordinates: 13°32′15″N 105°59′25″E
- Crosses: Sekong River
- Locale: Stung Treng, Cambodia
- Official name: 1st Cambodia-China Friendship Bridge
- Other name: Cambodia-China Friendship Bridge Sekong Stung Treng

Characteristics
- Total length: 1,057 m
- Width: 11m

History
- Constructed by: Shanghai Construction Group of China
- Opened: April 29, 2008

Location
- Interactive map of Sekong Bridge

The Sekong Bridge is a bridge spanning the Sekong River near the town of Stung Treng province in northeastern Cambodia. The bridge was officially opened in 2008 and was constructed with financial support from an interest-free loan provided by the Government of China.

The bridge connects Stung Treng province to National Road No.7 (part of the Asian Highway Network AH11), which runs from Skuon, Cambodia to Luang Prabang, Laos, enhancing regional connectivity and trade.

== Construction ==
On November 18, 2004, a groundbreakinig ceremony was held in Stung Treng province for the construction of the Sekong Bridge and National Road No.7. The bridge was built on the Sekong River by Shanghai Construction Group Co. The total project cost was $15 million USD.

== Inauguration ==
The Sekong Bridge, along with National Road No.7, was officially inaugurated on April 29, 2008, during a formal ceremony.
