= First Thai–Lao Friendship Bridge =

Bridge over Mekong River

First Thai–Lao Friendship Bridge สะพานมิตรภาพ ไทย-ลาว แห่งที่ ๑ ຂົວມິດຕະພາບ ລາວ-ໄທ ແຫ່ງທຳອິດ
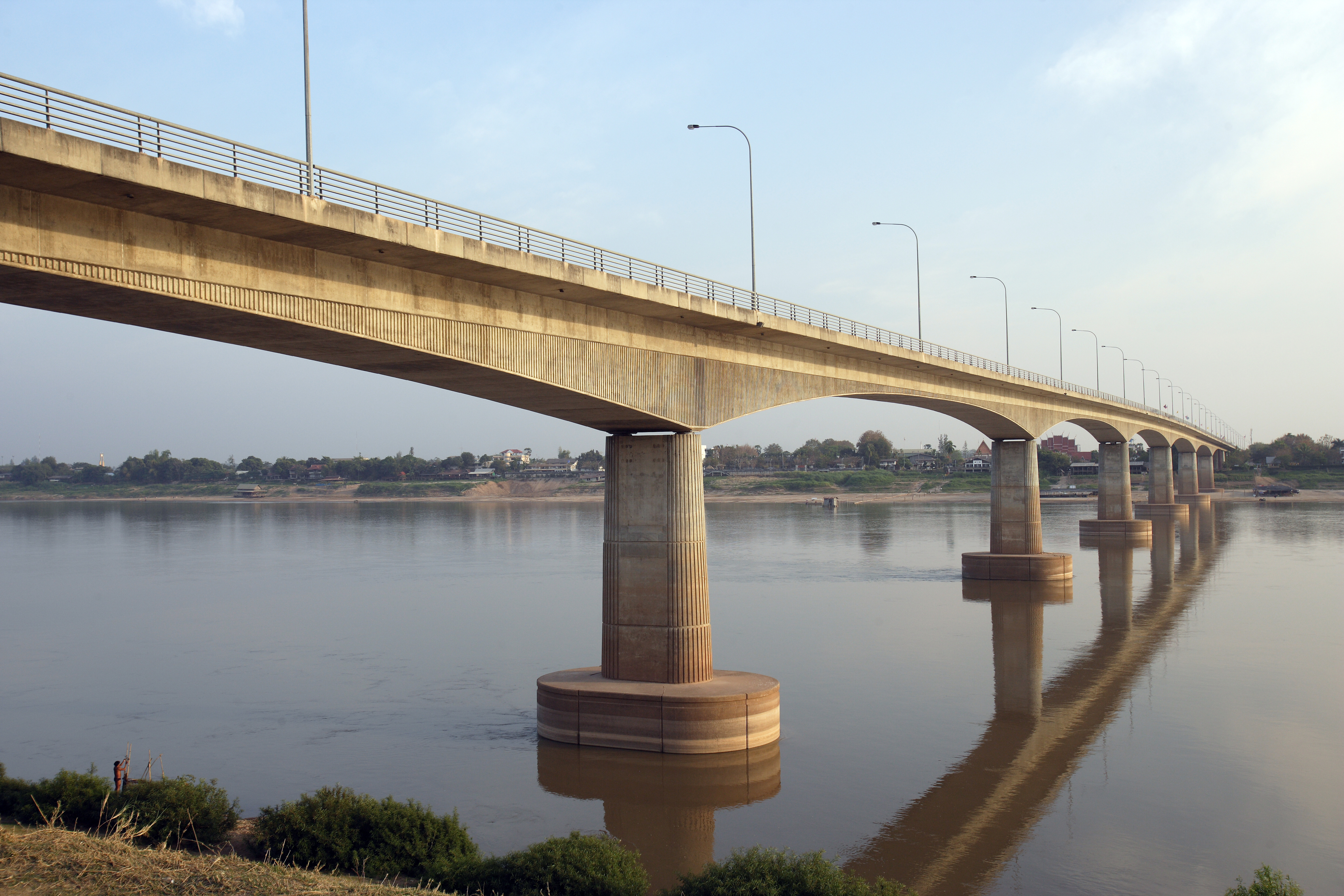
- Coordinates: 17°52′42″N 102°42′56″E
- Carries: Motor vehicles, Trains
- Crosses: Mekong River
- Locale: Nong Khai, Nong Khai Province; Vientiane, Vientiane Prefecture
- Official name: First Thai–Lao Friendship Bridge

Characteristics
- Total length: 1.17 km (3,800 ft)
- Width: 3.5 and 1.5 m (11 ft 6 in and 4 ft 11 in)

History
- Constructed by: John Holland
- Opened: 4 April 1994

Location
- Interactive map of First Thai–Lao Friendship Bridge

The First Thai–Lao Friendship Bridge (Note: Thai: สะพานมิตรภาพ ไทย-ลาว แห่งที่ 1, pronounced [sā.pʰāːn mít.trā.pʰâːp tʰāj lāːw hɛ̀ŋ tʰîː nɯ̀ŋ]; Lao: ຂົວມິດຕະພາບ ລາວ-ໄທ ແຫ່ງທຳອິດ, pronounced [kʰǔa mīt.tā.pʰâːp láːw tʰáj hɛ̄ŋ tʰám.ʔít]) is a bridge over the Mekong, connecting Nong Khai Province and the city of Nong Khai in Thailand with Vientiane Prefecture in Laos. The Lao capital city Vientiane is approximately 20 km (12 mi) from the bridge.

The bridge is 1,170 meters (0.73 mi) long. It has two 3.5 m (11 ft 6 in)-wide road lanes, two 1.5 m (4 ft 11 in)-wide footpaths and a single 1,000 mm (3 ft 3 3/8 in) gauge railway line in the middle, straddling the narrow central reservation.

- The rail gauge is 1,000 mm (3 ft 3 3/8 in)
- The loading gauge might be 3,000 mm (9 ft 10 in)
- The structure gauge (roughly equal to a road lane) might be about 4,000 mm (13 ft 1 in)

== History ==
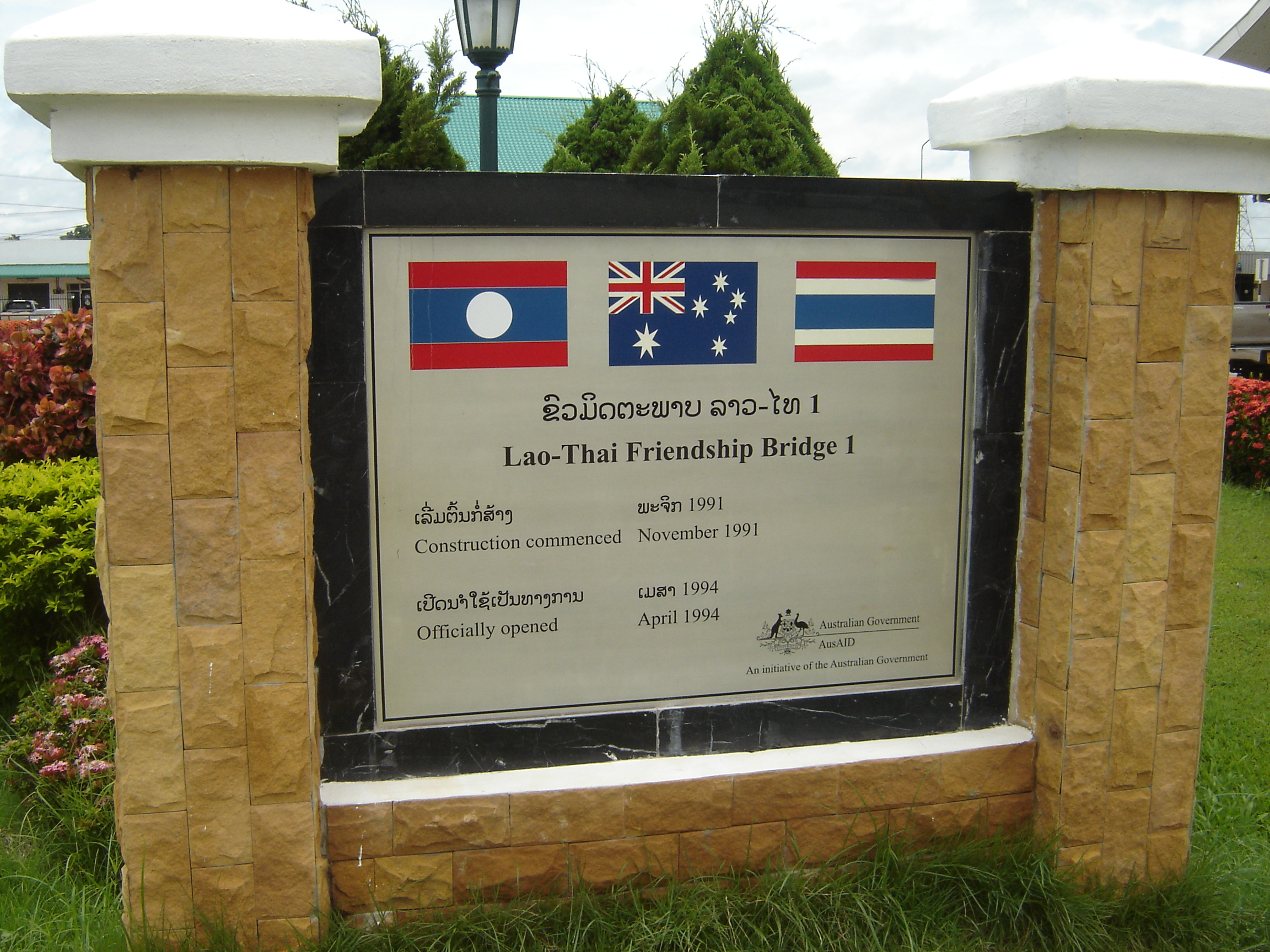
A plaque in Laos, in Lao and English, commemorating the First Thai-Lao Friendship Bridge.

Opened on 8 April 1994, it was the first bridge across the lower Mekong, and the second on the full course of the Mekong.

The cost was about A$42 million, funded by the Government of Australia as development aid for Laos.

The bridge was designed and built by Australian companies as a demonstration of their ability to complete major infrastructure projects in Southeast Asia. The concept design of a balanced cantilever bridge was proposed by Bruce Ramsay of VSL with the final design carried out by Maunsell consulting engineers. It was built by John Holland.

The official name of the bridge was changed, with the addition of "First" after the opening of the Second Thai–Lao Friendship Bridge further south at Savannakhet in January 2007.

== Road traffic ==
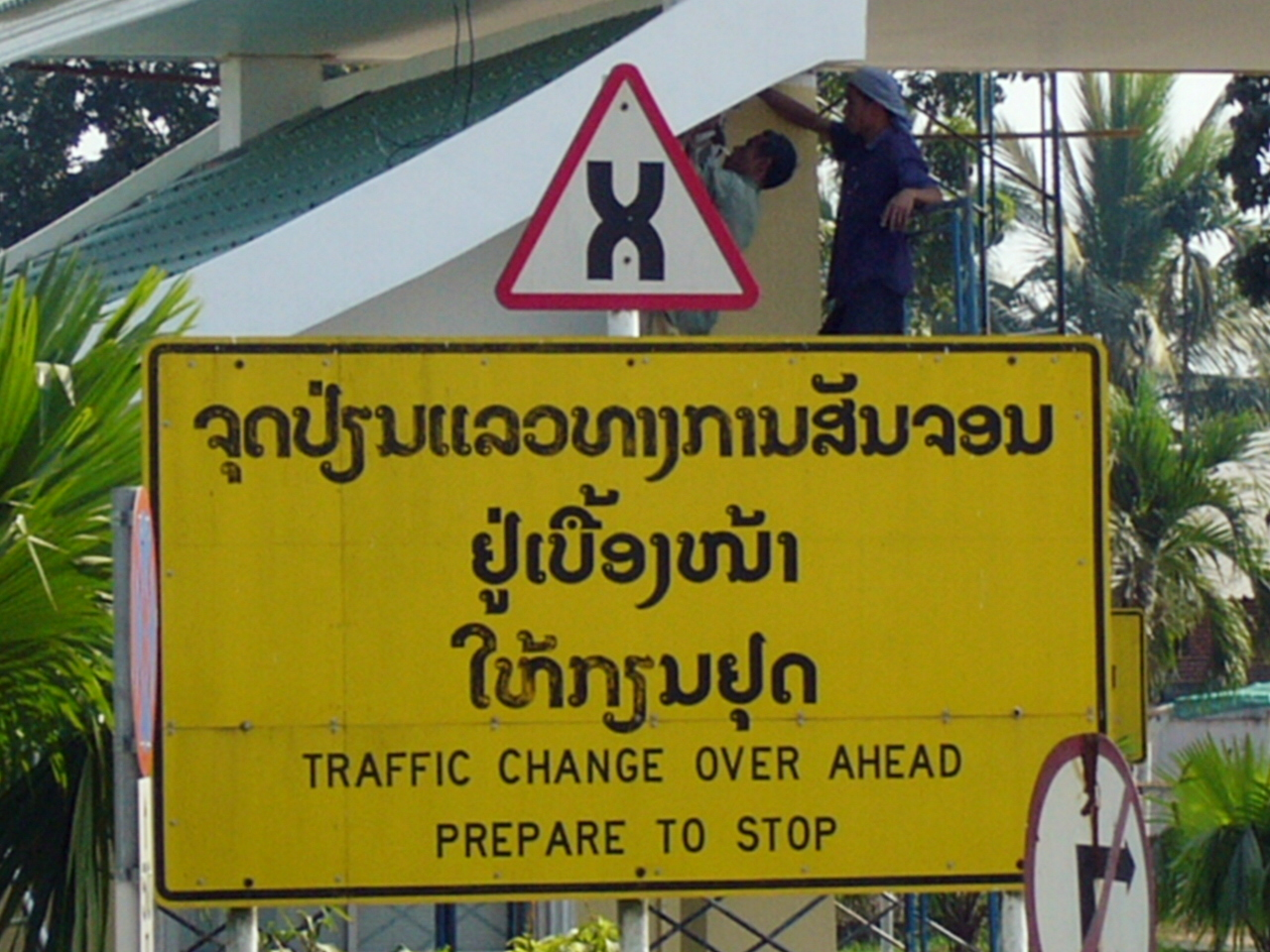
A sign for the road rules change at the Thai–Lao Friendship Bridge.

Traffic on the bridge drives on the left, as in Thailand. Traffic in Laos drives on the right. The changeover at the Lao end, just before the border post, is controlled by traffic lights.

A shuttle bus service operates across the bridge, between the Lao and Thai border posts.

Bicycles and tricycles can travel on either the road or the footpath, while pedestrians can walk directly on the footpath.

The bridge is part of AH12 of the Asian Highway Network.

== Railway ==
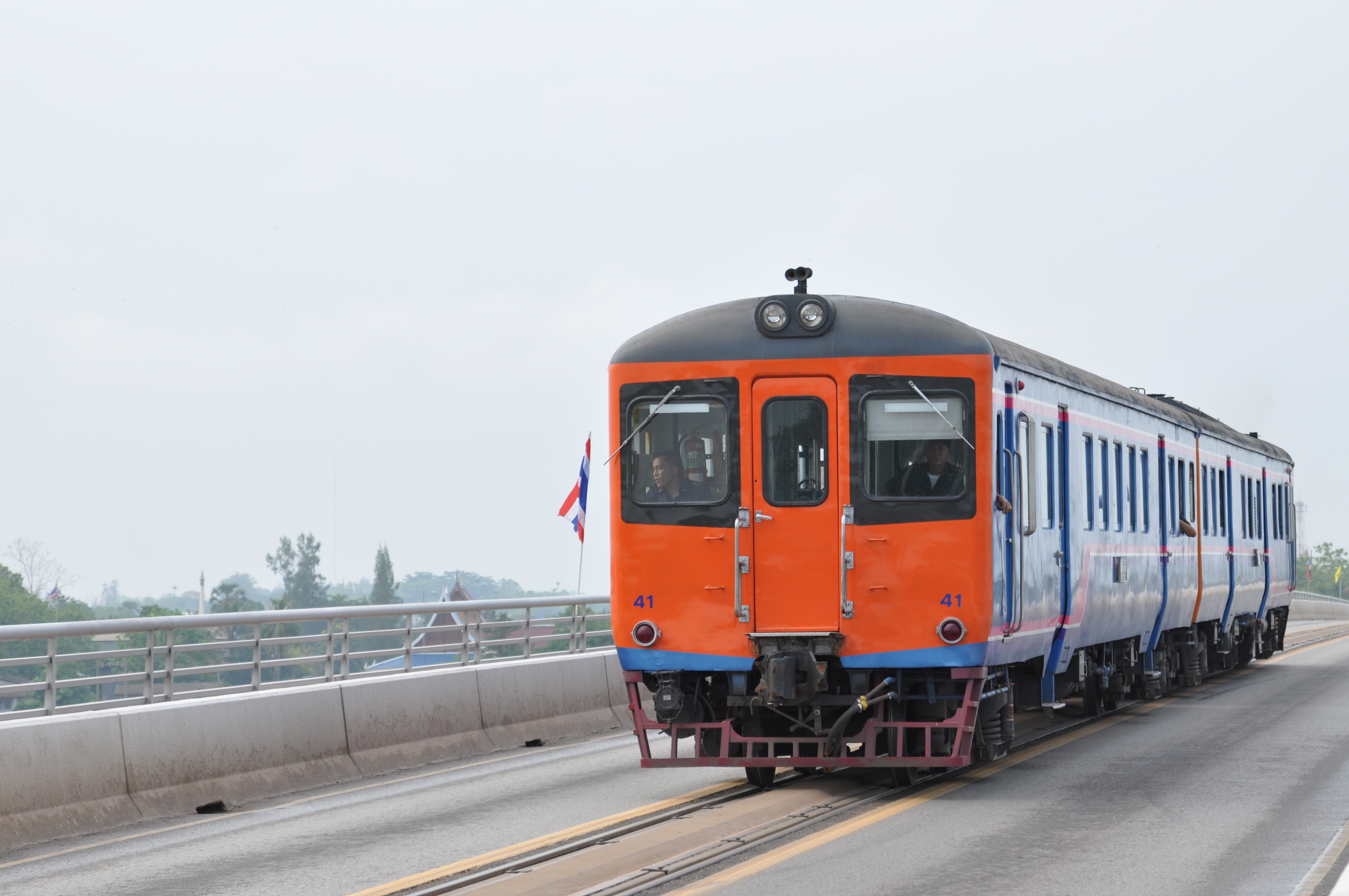
A train on the bridge.

A meter gauge rail track from Nong Khai station runs along the central reservation of the bridge. Road traffic is stopped when a train is crossing.

In March 2004, an agreement between the Thai and Lao governments was signed to extend the railway to Thanaleng Railway Station in Laos, about 3.5 km (2.2 mi) from the bridge. This was the first modern railway link to Laos, as a short portage line once existed. The Thai government agreed to finance the line through a combination of grant and loan. Construction began in January 2007. Test trains began running in July 2008. The formal inauguration occurred on 5 March 2009.

In February 2006, approval of funding for the rail line from Thanaleng Railway Station to Vientiane, was announced by the French Development Agency.

A US$50 million loan was reportedly received from the Thai government for the extension. Construction was originally slated to begin in December 2010. Lao railway officials confirmed as late as September 2010 that plans would go ahead. The extension, which would have taken an estimated three years to complete, would have stretched 9 km (5.6 mi) from Thanaleng to a new main Khamsavath Station. The station will be completed by June 2022, and open 2023.

Since February 2010, the Eastern & Oriental Express has crossed the Mekong via the bridge into Laos. There is currently no connection to the China-Laos Railway. The standard gauge line circles the north east of Vientiane, to a depot just 2 km from the Friendship Bridge. A new bridge is proposed from this point, to join the proposed Thai high-speed line at Nong Khai station just south of the Mekong.

== See also ==
- List of crossings of the Mekong River
- List of international bridges
- Second Thai–Lao Friendship Bridge
- Third Thai–Lao Friendship Bridge
- Fourth Thai–Lao Friendship Bridge
- Fifth Thai–Lao Friendship Bridge
- Transport in Laos
- Transport in Thailand
- Laos–Thailand relations
- Kunming–Singapore railway
