= Third Thai–Lao Friendship Bridge =

Third Thai–Lao Friendship Bridge สะพานมิตรภาพ ไทย-ลาว แห่งที่ ๓ ຂົວມິດຕະພາບ ລາວ-ໄທ ແຫ່ງທີສາມ
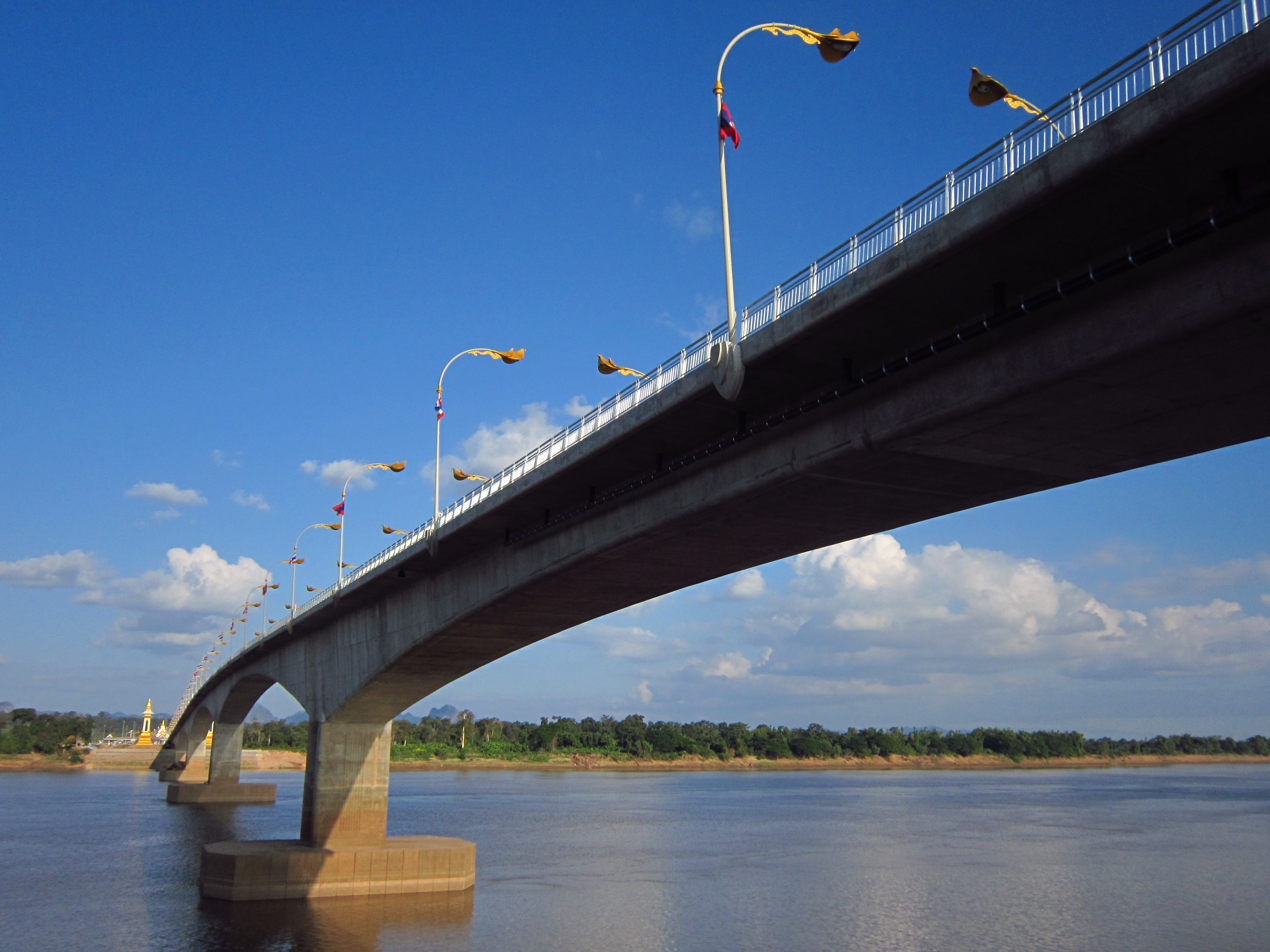
- Coordinates: 17°29′33″N 104°43′42″E
- Carries: Motor vehicles
- Crosses: Mekong River
- Locale: At Samat, Nakhon Phanom Province, Thailand; Thakhek, Khammouane Province, Laos
- Official name: Third Thai–Lao Friendship Bridge

Characteristics
- Design: Box girder bridge
- Total length: 1423 m
- Width: 13 m

History
- Opened: 11 November 2011

Location
- Interactive map of Third Thai–Lao Friendship Bridge

The Third Thai–Lao Friendship Bridge (Note: Thai: สะพานมิตรภาพ ไทย-ลาว แห่งที่ 3, pronounced [sā.pʰāːn mít.trā.pʰâːp tʰāj lāːw hɛ̀ŋ tʰîː sǎːm]; Lao: ຂົວມິດຕະພາບ ລາວ-ໄທ ແຫ່ງທີສາມ, pronounced [kʰǔa̯ mīt.tā.pʰâːp láːw tʰáj hɛ̄ŋ tʰīː sǎːm]) over the Mekong is a bridge that connects Nakhon Phanom Province in Thailand with Thakhek, Khammouane Province in Laos. The bridge's foundation stone was laid on 6 March 2009, and it opened for traffic on 11 November 2011. The bridge is 1,423 metres long and 13 metres wide.

The name "Third Thai-Lao Friendship Bridge" was previously also used to refer to the planned bridge from Chiang Khong, Thailand to Houayxay, Laos, but this bridge is now known as the Fourth Thai-Lao Friendship Bridge.

The bridge was expected to boost tourism and trade by reducing travel and cargo delivery time between the two countries.

Traffic on the bridge drives on the left, as in Thailand, while traffic in Laos drives on the right; the lane-change is on the Laos side.

== Highway 295 (Thailand) ==
National Highway 295
- ทางหลวงแผ่นดินหมายเลข 295

Route information
- Part of AH15
- Length: 1.423 km (0.884 mi)

Major junctions
- From: Hwy 212 at At Samat, Nakhon Phanom Province, Thailand
- To: at Thakhek, Khammouane Province, Laos

Location
- Country: Thailand

Highway system
- Highways in Thailand; Motorways; Asian Highways

Highway 295 is a part of The Third Thai–Lao Friendship Bridge, The highway starts at Chayangkun Road and ends at Highway 13.

== See also ==
- First Thai-Lao Friendship Bridge
- Second Thai-Lao Friendship Bridge
- Fourth Thai–Lao Friendship Bridge
- Fifth Thai-Lao Friendship Bridge
- Transportation in Laos
- Transport in Thailand
