= Fourth Thai–Lao Friendship Bridge =

Fourth Thai–Lao Friendship Bridge สะพานมิตรภาพ ไทย-ลาว แห่งที่ ๔ ຂົວມິດຕະພາບ ລາວ-ໄທ ແຫ່ງທີສີ່
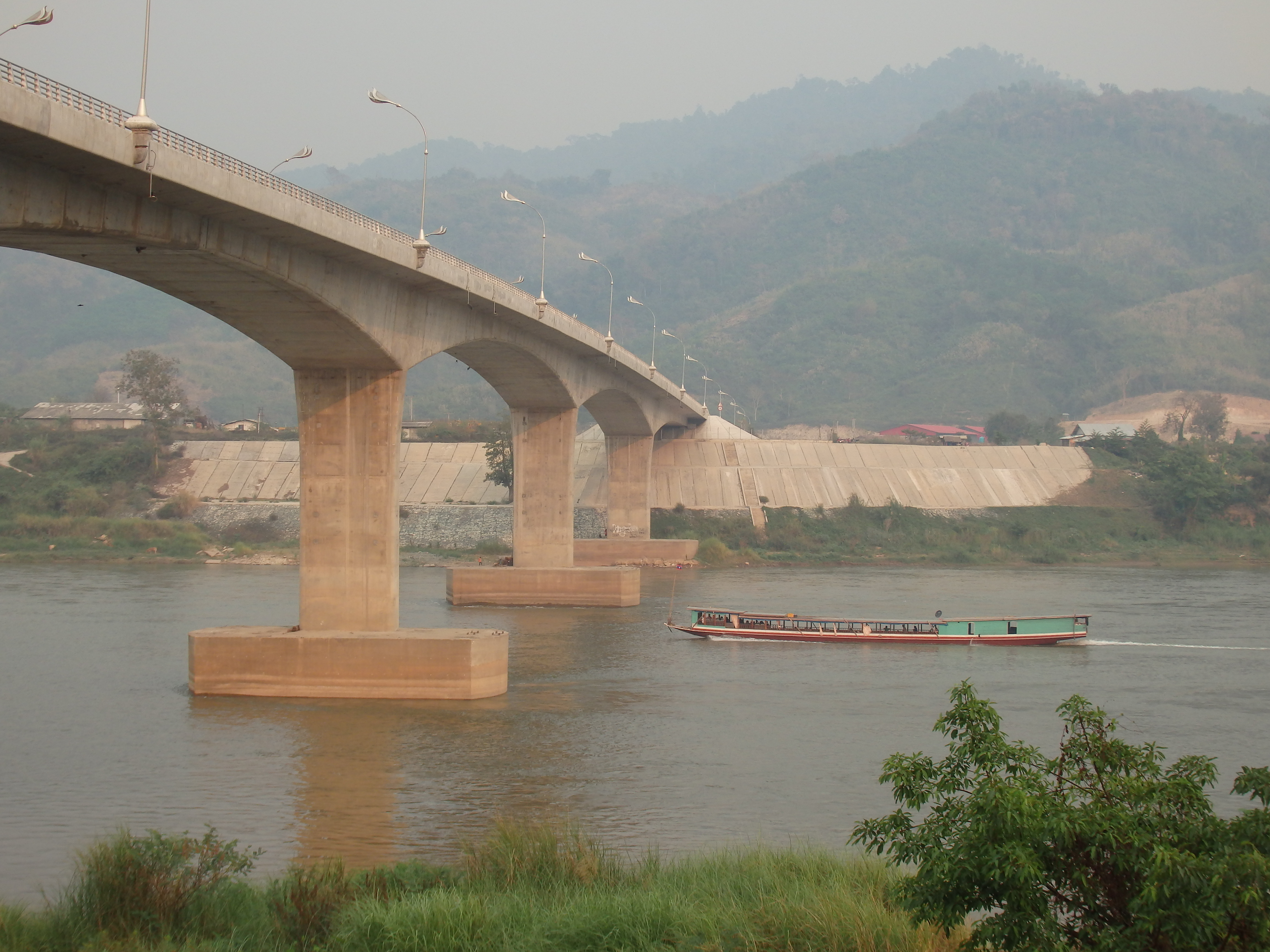
- Coordinates: 20°17′N 100°25′E
- Carries: Motor vehicles
- Crosses: Mekong River
- Locale: Wiang Chiang Khong, Chiang Rai Province; Houayxay, Bokèo Province

Characteristics
- Design: Box girder bridge
- Total length: 480 metres (1,570 ft)
- Width: 14.7 m

History
- Constructed by: CR5-KT Group of China and Krung Thon Engineering of Thailand
- Opened: 11 December 2013; 12 years ago

Location
- Interactive map of Fourth Thai–Lao Friendship Bridge

The Fourth Thai–Lao Friendship Bridge (Note: Thai: สะพานมิตรภาพ ไทย-ลาว แห่งที่ 4, pronounced [sā.pʰāːn mít.trā.pʰâːp tʰāj lāːw hɛ̀ŋ tʰîː sìː]; Lao: ຂົວມິດຕະພາບ ລາວ-ໄທ ແຫ່ງທີ 4, pronounced [kʰǔa̯ mīt.tā.pʰâːp láːw tʰáj hɛ̄ŋ tʰíː sīː]) is a highway bridge over the Mekong River that links the Chiang Khong District, Chiang Rai Province of Thailand and Houayxay in Laos. The bridge opened to the public on 11 December 2013. The bridge was the last section of Asian Highway 3 to be built.

Traffic on the bridge drives on the right, as in Laos, while traffic in Thailand drives on the left; the lane-change is on the Thai side.

== Size and location ==
The bridge is 630 meters long (with a main span of 480 meters) and is 14.7 meters wide. It is about 10 kilometers from Chiang Khong District in northeastern Chiang Rai Province, in northern Thailand, and about 12 kilometers from Houayxay, the capital of Bokeo Province, northwestern Laos.

North of the bridge, a six-kilometer service road connects the bridge to Laotian highway R3A. In the south, a three-kilometer service road connects the bridge to the Chiang Khong-Thoen Highway and Route 1129 in Thailand.

== History ==
The bridge was jointly financed by the governments of Thailand, Laos, and China – with Chinese and Thai firms responsible for the construction and the costs shared between Thailand and China. The project was hoped to boost trade and development of the Greater Mekong Subregion. About 1,900 million baht was budgeted for the project.

On 12 December 2012, a ceremony marking the joining of the two sides of the bridge was held in Houayxay, Laos. A year later, on 12 December 2013, the bridge was officially opened at a ceremony presided over by Thai Princess Maha Chakri Sirindhorn.

Chiang Khong was designated as a Special Economic Zone in 2015.

== See also ==
- First Thai–Lao Friendship Bridge
- Second Thai–Lao Friendship Bridge
- Third Thai–Lao Friendship Bridge
- Fifth Thai–Lao Friendship Bridge
- Kunming–Bangkok Expressway
