= Houayxay =

District & capital of Bokeo Province, Laos

Huayxai ເມືອງຫ້ວຍຊາຍ เมืองห้วยชาย Houay Xai, Huaysai
- District & municipality
- Huayxai District
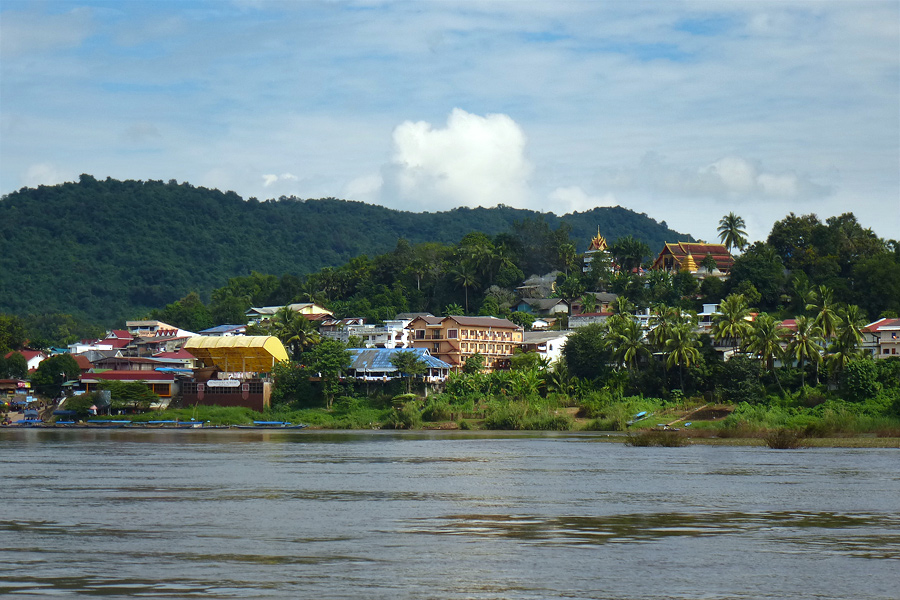
- Ban Houayxai from the Mekong River

- Location in Laos
- Coordinates: 20°15′47″N 100°26′1″E
- Country: Laos
- Admin. division: Bokeo Province
- Elevation: 398 m (1,306 ft)

Population (2015)
  - Total: 70,200
- Time zone: UTC+7 (ICT)
- Climate: Aw

Huayxai (Lao: ຫ້ວຍຊາຍ, pronounced [hȕaj sáːj]; Thai and Northeastern Thai: ห้วยชาย, Thai pronunciation: [hûaj tɕāːj]) (also Huaysai, Huay Xai or Houay Xai) is a district and capital of Bokeo Province, Laos, on the border with Thailand.

The town lies on the Mekong River opposite Chiang Khong in Thailand. The Fourth Thai-Lao Friendship Bridge at Ban Huayxai, which opened in December 2013 and replaced ferry service across the river, is the northernmost road border crossing between the two countries. Asian Highway 3, which runs through Ban Huayxai, extends north to Yunnan Province of China and south to Chiang Rai Province of Thailand.

Huayxai has a domestic airport (HOE) with regular flights to Vientiane and Luang Prabang (depending on the season).

The town is the starting point for boats (speed and slow boats, freighters, luxury cruisers for tourists and others) on the Mekong River to Pakbeng, Luang Prabang and other destinations.

Huayxai is home to the Gibbon Experience. It is a series of ziplines and the world highest treehouses providing an overnight experience.

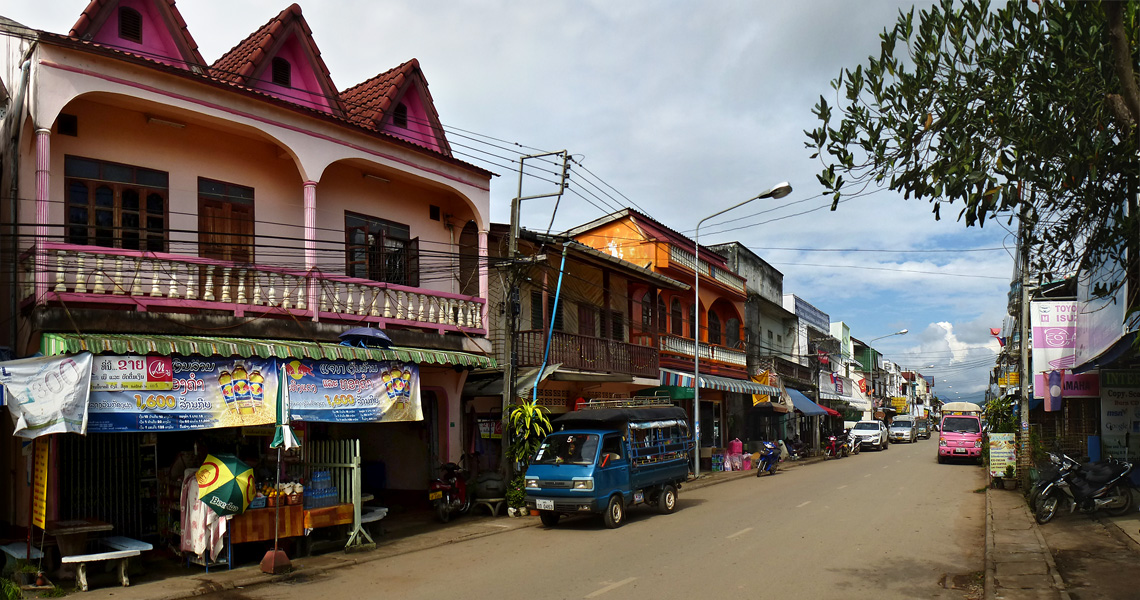
Town centre

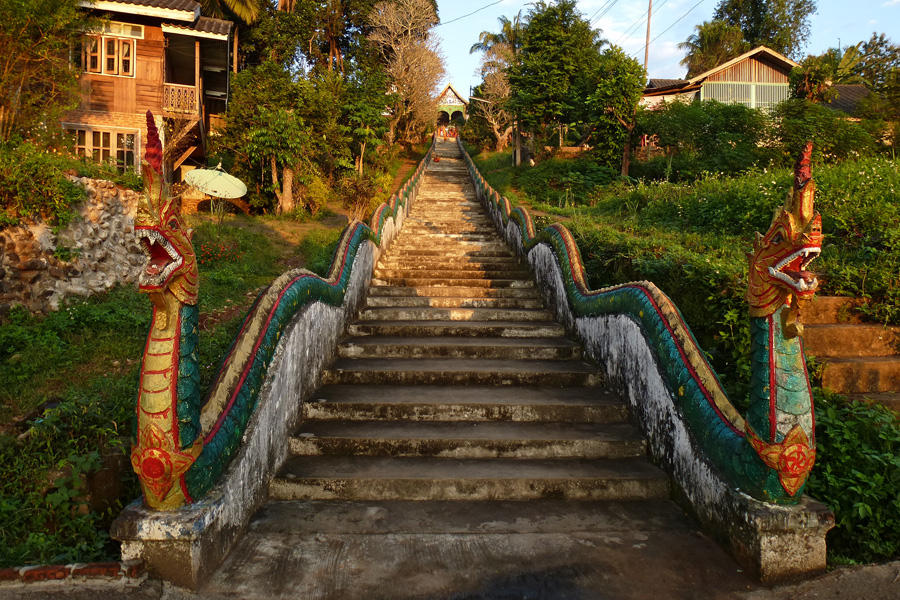
Stairs to the hill of the temple

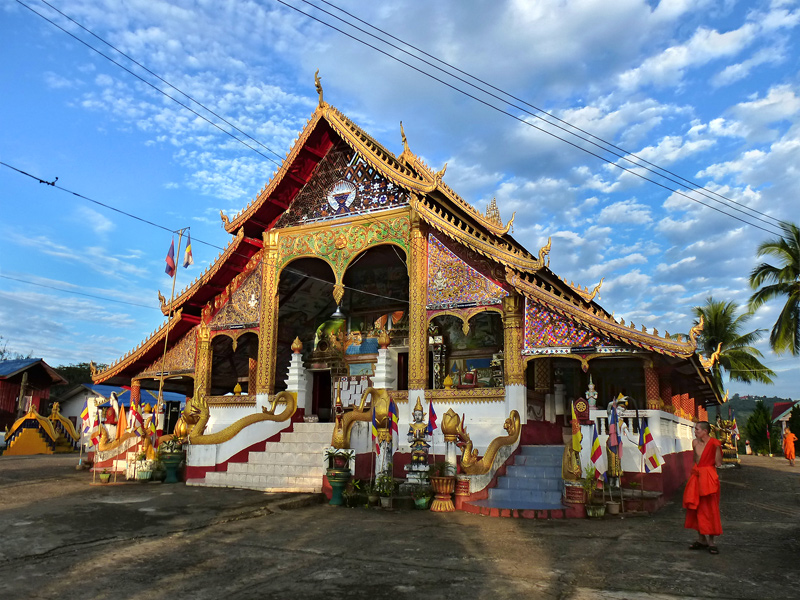
Vat Chom Khao Manilat

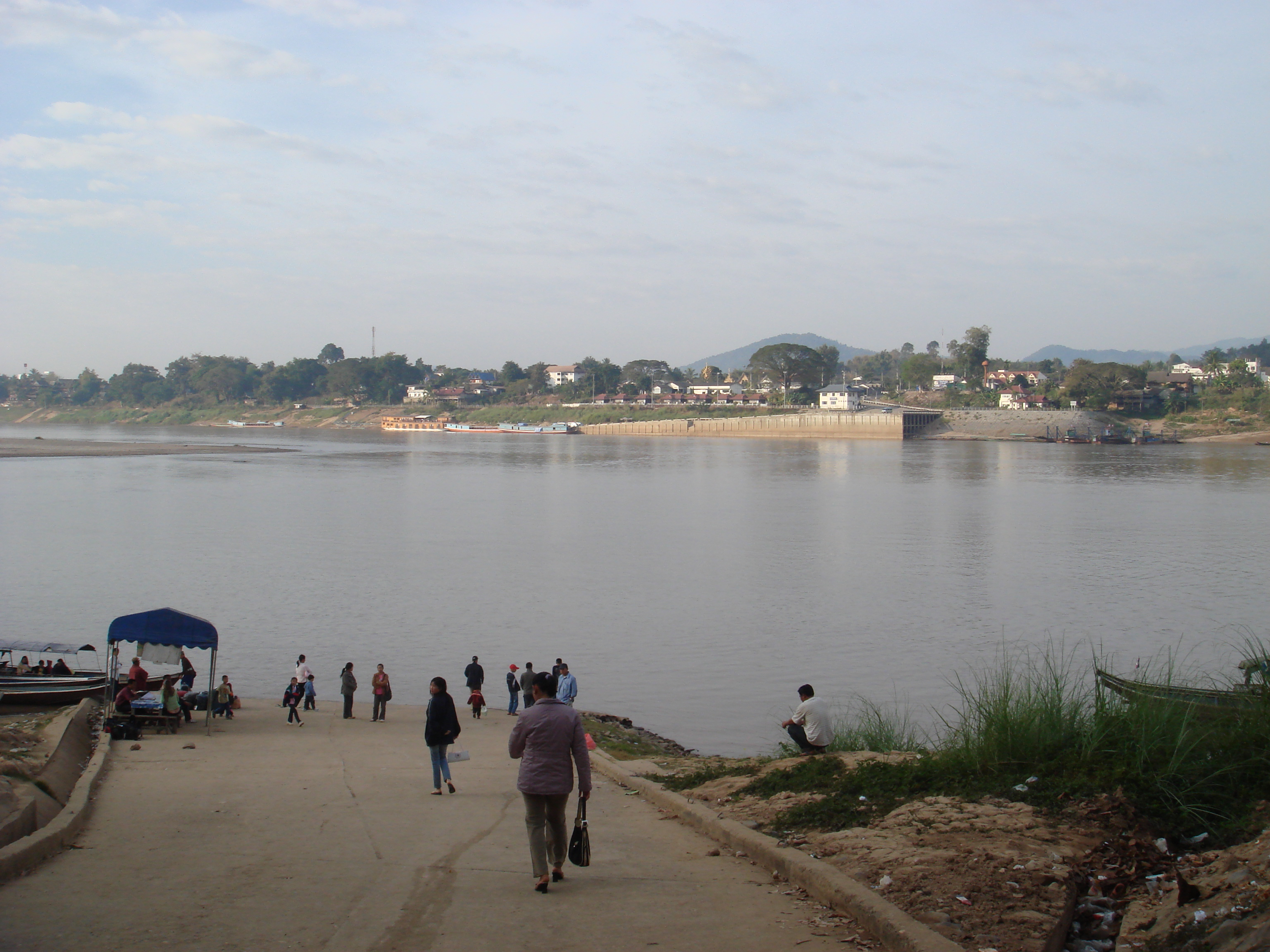
Border crossing to Thailand

== Climate ==
Climate data for Houayxay (1990–2019)
Month	Jan	Feb	Mar	Apr	May	Jun	Jul	Aug	Sep	Oct	Nov	Dec	Year
Mean daily maximum °C (°F)	28.3 (82.9)	31.0 (87.8)	33.5 (92.3)	34.2 (93.6)	32.6 (90.7)	31.8 (89.2)	30.5 (86.9)	30.5 (86.9)	31.1 (88.0)	30.8 (87.4)	29.3 (84.7)	27.3 (81.1)	30.9 (87.6)
Mean daily minimum °C (°F)	14.6 (58.3)	15.6 (60.1)	18.3 (64.9)	21.2 (70.2)	22.7 (72.9)	23.6 (74.5)	23.4 (74.1)	23.2 (73.8)	22.7 (72.9)	21.1 (70.0)	18.1 (64.6)	15.5 (59.9)	20.0 (68.0)
Average precipitation mm (inches)	23 (0.9)	19 (0.7)	43 (1.7)	112 (4.4)	226 (8.9)	207 (8.1)	395 (15.6)	412 (16.2)	249 (9.8)	109 (4.3)	50 (2.0)	23 (0.9)	1,868 (73.5)
Source: Food and Agriculture Organization of the United Nations
