= Second Thai–Lao Friendship Bridge =

Bridge on the Mekong River, Laos-Thailand

Second Thai–Lao Friendship Bridge: สะพานมิตรภาพ ไทย-ลาว แห่งที่ 2 (Thai); ຂົວມິດຕະພາບ ລາວ-ໄທ ແຫ່ງທີສອງ (Lao)
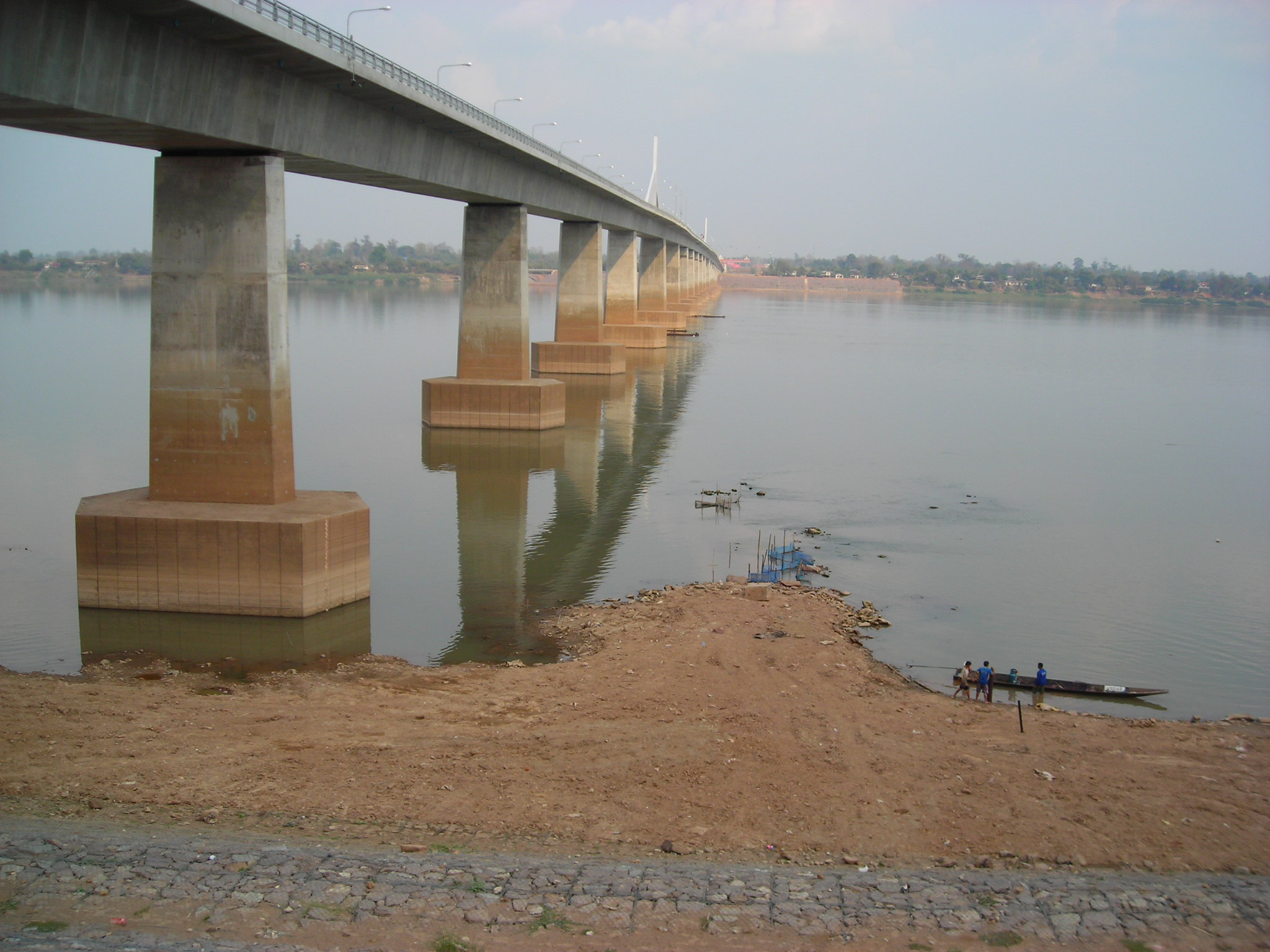
- Second Thai–Lao Friendship Bridge, seen from Mukdahan
- Coordinates: 16°36′04″N 104°44′09″E
- Carries: AH16 ( Route 239)
- Crosses: Mekong
- Locale: Mukdahan, Thailand - Savannakhet, Laos

Characteristics
- Design: Box girder bridge
- Material: Prestressed concrete
- Total length: 2,702 m (1.7 mi)
- Traversable?: yes
- No. of lanes: 2

History
- Construction start: 2004
- Construction end: 2006
- Construction cost: 2.5 billion THB
- Opened: 2007
- Inaugurated: 19 December 2006

Location
- Interactive map of Second Thai–Lao Friendship Bridge

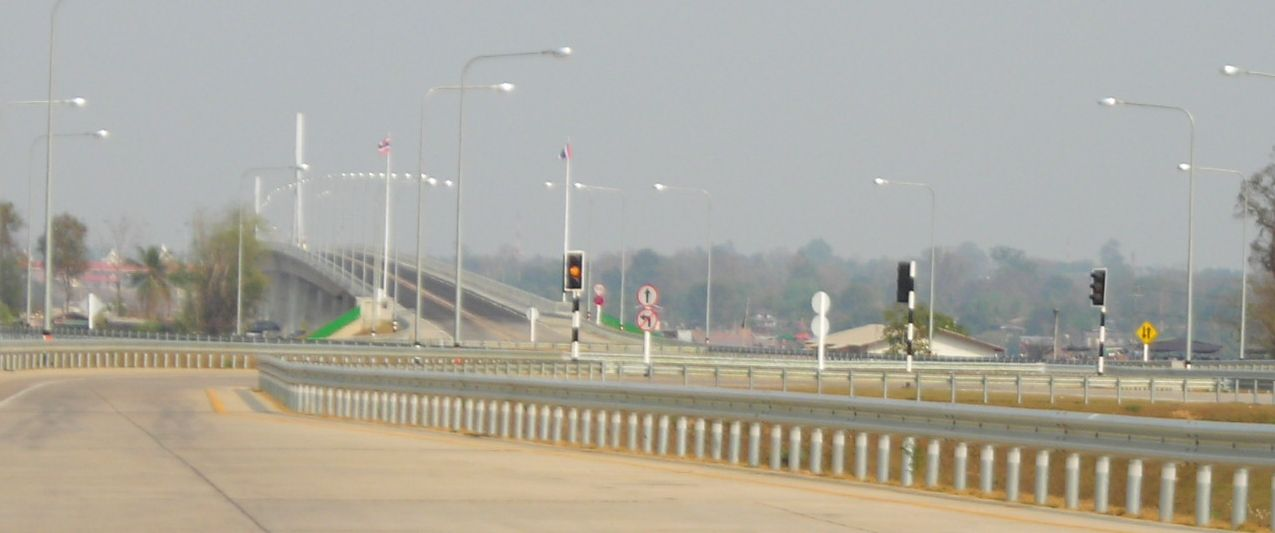
Change from left to right hand drive

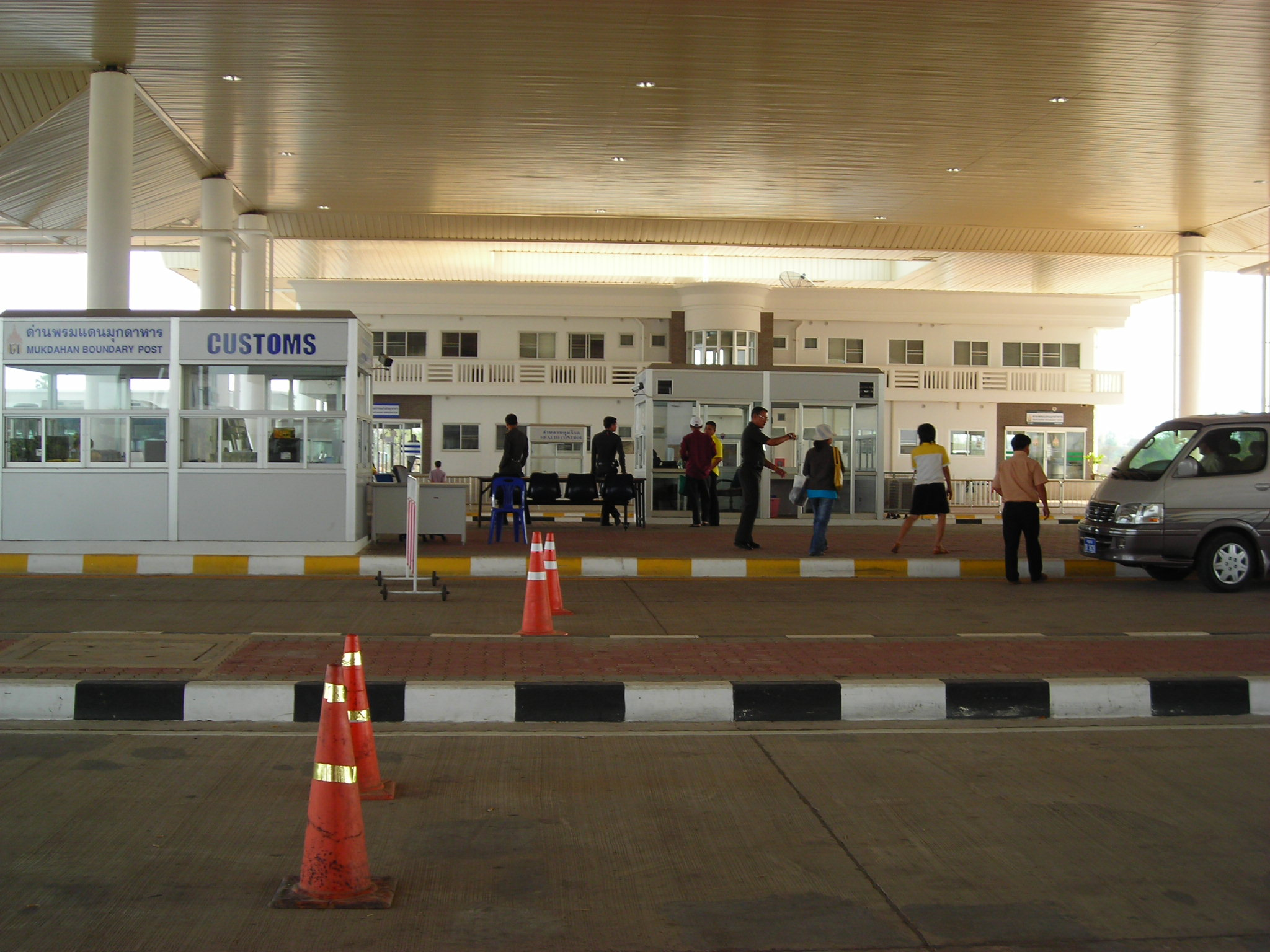
Checkpoint near the bridge (Thai side)

The Second Thai–Lao Friendship Bridge (Note: Thai: สะพานมิตรภาพ ไทย-ลาว แห่งที่ 2, pronounced [sā.pʰāːn mít.trā.pʰâːp tʰāj lāːw hɛ̀ŋ tʰîː sɔ̌ːŋ]; Lao: ຂົວມິດຕະພາບ ລາວ-ໄທ ແຫ່ງທີສອງ, pronounced [kʰǔa̯ mīt.tā.pʰâːp láːw tʰáj hɛ̄ŋ tʰīː sɔ̌ːŋ]) over the Mekong connects Mukdahan Province in Thailand with Savannakhet in Laos. The bridge is 1600 meters (1.0 mi) long and 12 meters (39 ft) wide, with two traffic lanes.

Traffic on the bridge drives on the right, as in Laos, while traffic in Thailand drives on the left; the lane-change is on the Thai side.

== History ==
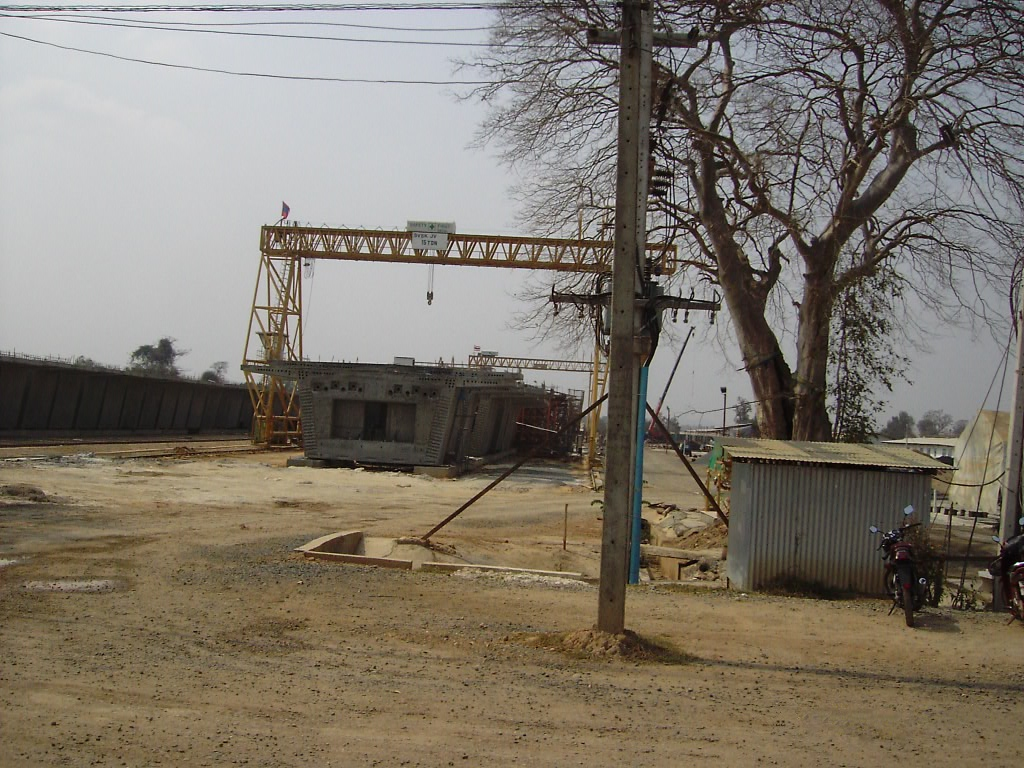
Box girder sections being constructed

Bridge construction began on 21 March 2004. Supports and spans were constructed on shore, then moved out onto pylons in the river by crane.

The total cost was about 2.5 billion baht (US$70 million), funded largely by a Japanese loan. An opening ceremony was held on 19 December 2006, and the bridge opened to the general public on 9 January 2007.

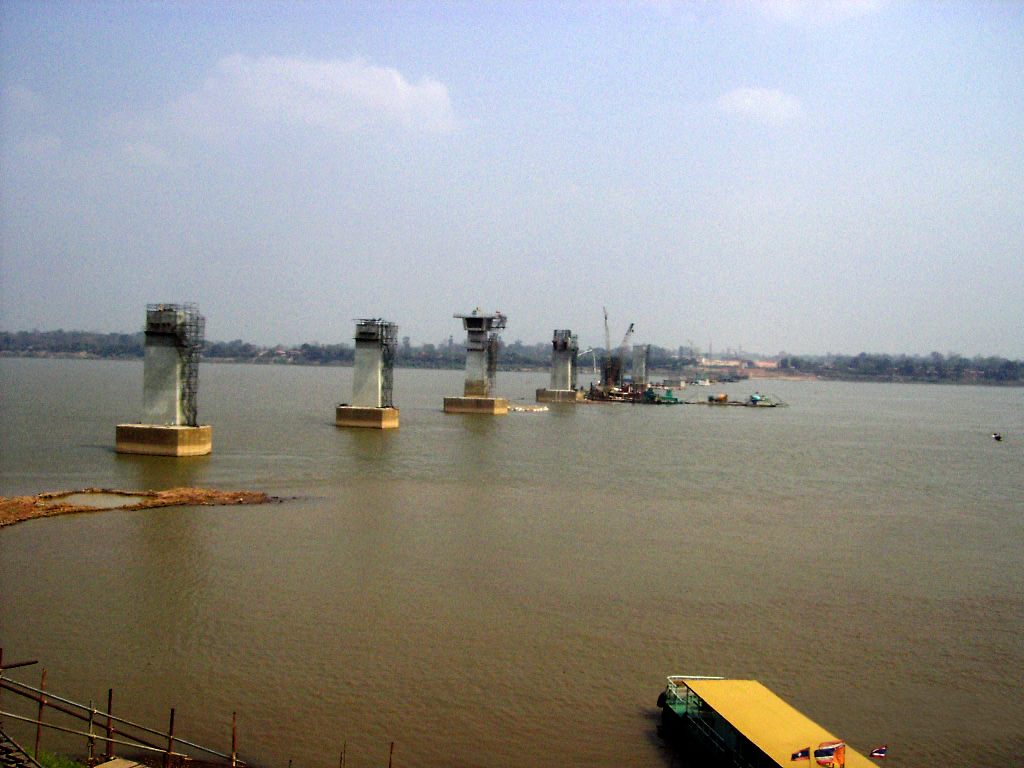
Pylons being constructed

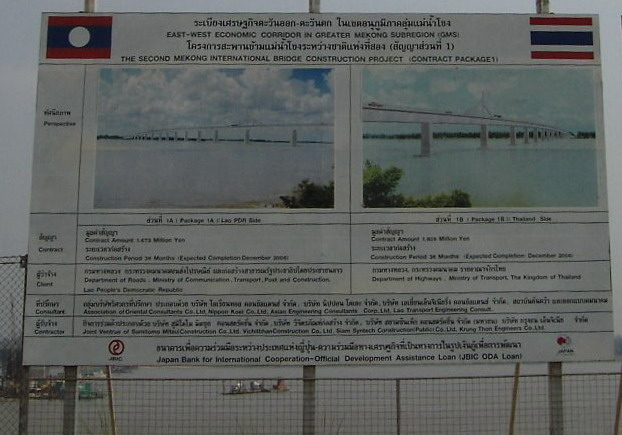
Project sign

== See also ==
- First Thai–Lao Friendship Bridge
- Third Thai–Lao Friendship Bridge
- Fourth Thai–Lao Friendship Bridge
- Fifth Thai–Lao Friendship Bridge
- Transportation in Laos
- Transport in Thailand
- List of international bridges
