= Fifth Thai–Lao Friendship Bridge =

Bridge in Thailand

Fifth Thai–Lao Friendship Bridge สะพานมิตรภาพ ไทย-ลาว แห่งที่ ๕ ຂົວມິດຕະພາບ ລາວ-ໄທ ແຫ່ງທີຫ້າ
- Coordinates: 18°24′22″N 103°34′06″E
- Carries: Motor vehicles
- Crosses: Mekong River
- Locale: Mueang Bueng Kan district, Bueng Kan Province; Pakxan, Bolikhamxai Province

Characteristics
- Design: Box girder bridge
- Total length: 1300 meters

History
- Opened: 25 December 2025

Location
- Interactive map of Fifth Thai–Lao Friendship Bridge

The Fifth Thai–Lao Friendship Bridge (Note: Thai: สะพานมิตรภาพ ไทย-ลาว แห่งที่ 5, pronounced [sā.pʰāːn mít.trā.pʰâːp tʰāj lāːw hɛ̀ŋ tʰîː hâː]; Lao: ຂົວມິດຕະພາບ ລາວ-ໄທ ແຫ່ງທີ 5, pronounced [kʰǔa̯ mīt.tā.pʰâːp láːw tʰáj hɛ̄ŋ tʰíː hȁː]) is a highway bridge over the Mekong River that links the Bueng Kan Province of Thailand and Pakxan town, Bolikhamxai Province in Laos. The project includes a 16 km four-lane road, including a 12-km Highway 244 at Bueng Kan district, the 1.3 km Mekong Bridge Proper (two-lane) and a 2.8 km road in Laos.

== History ==
Construction of the bridge began in December 2021 and opened to the public on 27 December 2025. The project completion was initially scheduled in 2024, but faced delays due to the impact of the Covid-19 pandemic.

== See also ==
- First Thai–Lao Friendship Bridge
- Second Thai–Lao Friendship Bridge
- Third Thai–Lao Friendship Bridge
- Fourth Thai–Lao Friendship Bridge
