= List of international bridges =

An international bridge is a structure that provides transportation across borders. Tourists and cross-border commuters travelling between countries often use these bridges. Such bridges also facilitate international trade. Below is a list of international bridges:

== Asia ==
Countries	Bridge	Description
Afghanistan; Tajikistan	Tajik–Afghan Friendship Bridge	A bridge connecting Demogan, Afghanistan with Khorog, Tajikistan.
Afghanistan; Uzbekistan	Afghanistan–Uzbekistan Friendship Bridge	A bridge connecting Hairatan, Afghanistan, with Termez, Uzbekistan.
Azerbaijan; Georgia	Red Bridge	A red brick bridge connecting Azerbaijan and Georgia.
Bahrain; Saudi Arabia	King Fahd Causeway	25 km series of bridges connecting Bahrain with Saudi Arabia.
Bahrain; Saudi Arabia	King Hamad Causeway	A proposed parallel series of bridges next to the King Faud Causeway.
Bahrain; Qatar	Qatar–Bahrain Causeway	A proposed causeway between Bahrain and Qatar.
Bangladesh; India	Maitri Setu	1.9 km Maitri Setu connecting Chittagong in Bangladesh with Northeast India.
China; Nepal	Sino-Nepal Friendship Bridge	A bridge connecting Zhangmu, China, with Kodari, Nepal.
China; North Korea	Changbai–Hyesan International Bridge	A bridge connecting Changbai, Jilin, China, with Hyesan, Ryanggang, North Korea.
China; North Korea	Linjiang Yalu River Bridge	A bridge connecting Linjiang, Jilin, China, with Hyesan, Ryanggang, North Korea.
China; North Korea	New Yalu River Bridge	A bridge connecting Dandong, Liaoning, China, with Sinuiju, North Pyongan, North Korea.
China; North Korea	Sino-Korean Friendship Bridge	A bridge connecting Dandong, Liaoning, China, with Sinuiju, North Pyongan, North Korea.
China; North Korea	Tumen Border Bridge	A bridge connecting Tumen, Jilin, China, with Namyang Workers' District, North Hamgyong, North Korea.
China; North Korea	Tumen River Bridge	A bridge connecting Hunchun, Jilin, China, with Rason, North Korea.
China; Russia	Blagoveshchensk–Heihe Bridge	A bridge connecting Heihe, Heilongjiang, China, with Blagoveshchensk, Russia.
China; Russia	Tongjiang-Nizhneleninskoye railway bridge	A railway bridge connecting Tongjiang, Heilongjiang, China, with Nizhneleninskoye, Jewish Autonomous Oblast, Russia.
Indonesia; Malaysia	Malacca Strait Bridge	A proposed project bridge connecting the islands of Rupat and Sumatra in Indonesia with Telok Gong, Malaysia.
Indonesia; Singapore	Singapore Strait crossing	A proposed project connecting Indonesia and Singapore through the Riau Archipelago.
Malaysia; Thailand	Bukit Bunga–Ban Buketa Bridge	A bridge connecting Bukit Bunga, Malaysia, with Buke Ta, Thailand.
Malaysia; Thailand	Rantau Panjang–Sungai Golok Bridge	A bridge connecting Kelantan, Malaysia, with Su-ngai Kolok, Thailand.
Malaysia; Singapore	Johor–Singapore Causeway	A bridge connecting Johor Bahru, Malaysia, with Woodlands, Singapore.
Malaysia; Singapore	Malaysia–Singapore Second Link	A bridge connecting Tanjung Kupang, Malaysia, with Tuas, Singapore.
Malaysia; Singapore	Malaysia–Singapore Third Crossing	A proposed bridge connecting Johor, Malaysia, with Changi, Singapore.
Laos; Thailand	First Thai–Lao Friendship Bridge	A bridge connecting Vientiane, Laos, with Nong Khai, Thailand.
Laos; Thailand	Second Thai–Lao Friendship Bridge	A bridge connecting Savannakhet, Laos, with Mukdahan, Thailand.
Laos; Thailand	Third Thai–Lao Friendship Bridge	A bridge connecting Thakhek, Laos, with At Samat, Thailand.
Laos; Thailand	Fourth Thai–Lao Friendship Bridge	A bridge connecting Houayxay, Laos, with Wiang Chiang Khong, Thailand.
Laos; Thailand	Fifth Thai–Lao Friendship Bridge	A bridge connecting Pakxan, Laos, with Mueang Bueng Kan, Thailand.
Myanmar; Thailand	Thai–Myanmar Friendship Bridge	A bridge connecting Myawaddy, Myanmar, with Mae Sot, Thailand.
North Korea; Russia	Korea–Russia Friendship Bridge	A railway bridge connecting North Korea and Russia over the Tumen River.
North Korea; Russia	Yakov Novichenko Bridge	A road bridge connecting North Korea and Russia over the Tumen River.
North Korea; South Korea	Bridge of No Return	A bridge over the Military Demarcation Line in between North and South Korea.

== Africa ==
Countries	Bridge	Description
Botswana; Zambia	Kazungula Bridge	A bridge connecting Botswana and Zambia at Kazungula.
Egypt; Saudi Arabia	Saudi–Egypt Causeway	A proposed project connecting Egypt and Saudi Arabia through the Straits of Tiran.
Malawi; Tanzania	Songwe Bridge	A bridge connecting Malawi and Tanzania through the Songwe River.
Mozambique; Tanzania	Unity Bridge	A bridge connecting Negomano, Mozambique, with Nanyumbu, Tanzania.
Mozambique; Tanzania	Unity Bridge 2	A bridge connecting Lupilichi, Mozambique, with Kivikoni, Tanzania.
Namibia; South Africa	Ernest Oppenheimer Bridge	A bridge connecting Oranjemund, Namibia, with Alexander Bay, South Africa.
Namibia; Zambia	Katima Mulilo Bridge	A bridge connecting Katima Mulilo, Namibia, with Sesheke, Zambia.
Rwanda; Tanzania	Rusumo Bridge	A bridge connecting Rwanda and Tanzania over the Kagera River.
Rwanda; Tanzania	Rusumo International Bridge	A bridge connecting Rwanda and Tanzania over the Kagera River.
South Africa; Zimbabwe	Alfred Beit Road Bridge	A bridge connecting Musina, South Africa, with Beitbridge, Zimbabwe.
Zambia; Zimbabwe	Chirundu Bridge	A bridge connecting Chirundu, Zambia, with Chirundu, Zimbabwe.
Zambia; Zimbabwe	Victoria Falls Bridge	A bridge connecting Livingstone, Zambia, with Victoria Falls, Zimbabwe.

== Europe ==
Countries	Bridge	Description
Austria; Hungary	Brücke von Andau	A bridge crossing the river on the international boundaries of Austria and Hungary.
Luxembourg; Germany	Sauer Valley Bridge	A bridge crossing the Sauer river between Luxembourg and Germany.
Bosnia and Herzegovina; Serbia	Rača Bridge	A bridge connecting Bosanska Rača, Bosnia, with Sremska Rača, Serbia.
Bulgaria; Romania	New Europe Bridge	A bridge connecting Vidin, Bulgaria, with Calafat, Romania.
Denmark; Sweden	Øresund Bridge	A bridge connecting Denmark and Sweden over the Øresund strait.
Estonia; Russia	Friendship Bridge	A bridge connecting Narva, Estonia, with Ivangorod, Russia.
Estonia; Russia	Narva Railway Bridge	One of the two railway bridges between Narva and Ivangorod railway stations.
Finland; Norway	Sami Bridge	A bridge connecting Finland and Norway through Tana river.
Finland; Sweden	Torne River Railway Bridge	A bridge connecting Tornio, Finland, with Haparanda, Sweden.
France; Germany	Pierre Pflimlin Bridge	A bridge connecting Strasbourg, France, with Kehl, Germany.
France; Germany	Rhine Bridge	A bridge connecting Strasbourg, France, with Kehl, Germany.
France; Germany; Switzerland	Three Countries Bridge	A bridge connecting Huningue, France, with Weil am Rhein, Germany, and Basel, Switzerland.
France; Germany	Friendship Bridge	A bridge connecting Grosbliederstroff, France, with Kleinblittersdorf, Germany.
Germany; Switzerland	Holzbrücke Bad Säckingen	A bridge connecting Bad Säckingen, Germany, with Stein, Aargau, Switzerland.
Greece; Turkey	Maritsa River Bridge	A bridge connecting Greece and Turkey over the Maritsa River.
Hungary; Slovakia	Mária Valéria Bridge	A bridge connecting Esztergom, Hungary, with Štúrovo, Slovakia.
Ireland; Northern Ireland	Senator George Mitchell Peace Bridge	A bridge connecting Cavan, Ireland, with Enniskillen, Northern Ireland.
Lithuania; Russia	Queen Louise Bridge	A bridge connecting Panemunė, Lithuania, with Sovetsk, Kaliningrad Oblast, Russia.
Norway; Sweden	Svinesund Bridge	A bridge connecting Iddefjord, Norway, with Svinesund, Sweden.
Romania; Serbia	Ostrovul Mare Bridge	A bridge connecting Romania with Serbia over the Danube river.
Portugal; Spain	Guadiana International Bridge	A bridge connecting Castro Marim, Portugal, with Ayamonte, Spain.
Portugal; Spain	Lower Guadiana International bridge	A bridge connecting Portugal and Spain over the Chanza River.

== North America ==
- List of international bridges in North America

== South America ==
Countries	Bridge	Description
Argentina; Bolivia	Horacio Guzmán International Bridge	A bridge connecting La Quiaca, Argentina, with Villazón, Bolivia.
Argentina; Brazil	Integration Bridge	A bridge connecting Santo Tomé, Corrientes, Argentina, with São Borja, Brazil.
Argentina; Brazil	Paso de los Libres–Uruguaiana International Bridge	A bridge connecting Paso de los Libres, Argentina, with Uruguaiana, Brazil.
Argentina; Brazil	Tancredo Neves Bridge	A bridge connecting Puerto Iguazú, Argentina, with Foz do Iguaçu, Brazil.
Argentina; Paraguay	San Roque González de Santa Cruz Bridge	A bridge connecting Posadas, Misiones, Argentina, with Itapúa, Paraguay.
Argentina; Uruguay	General Artigas Bridge	A bridge connecting Colón, Entre Ríos, Argentina, with Paysandú, Uruguay.
Argentina; Uruguay	Libertador General San Martín Bridge	A bridge connecting Gualeguaychú, Entre Ríos, Argentina, with Fray Bentos, Uruguay.
Argentina; Uruguay	Salto Grande Bridge	A bridge connecting Concordia, Entre Ríos, Argentina, with Salto, Uruguay.
Bolivia; Brazil	Wilson Pinheiro Binational Bridge	A bridge connecting Cobija, Bolivia, with Brasiléia, Brazil.
Brazil; France	Franco-Brazilian Binational Bridge	A bridge connecting Oiapoque, Amapá, Brazil, with Saint-Georges, French Guiana, France.
Brazil; Guyana	Takutu River Bridge	A bridge connecting Bonfim, Roraima, Brazil, with Lethem, Guyana.This is also the only border crossing in the Americas where the road changes sides (Guyana drives on the left and Brazil drives on the right)
Brazil; Paraguay	Friendship Bridge	A bridge connecting Foz do Iguaçu, Brazil, with Ciudad del Este, Paraguay.
Brazil; Peru	Brazil–Peru Integration Bridge	A bridge connecting Assis Brasil, Brazil, with Iñapari, Peru.
Brazil; Uruguay	Baron of Mauá International Bridge	A bridge connecting Jaguarão, Rio Grande do Sul, Brazil, with Río Branco, Uruguay.
Colombia; Ecuador	Rumichaca Bridge	A bridge connecting Ipiales, Colombia, with Tulcán, Ecuador.

== See also ==
- List of bridges
- List of international tunnels
