= List of international tunnels =

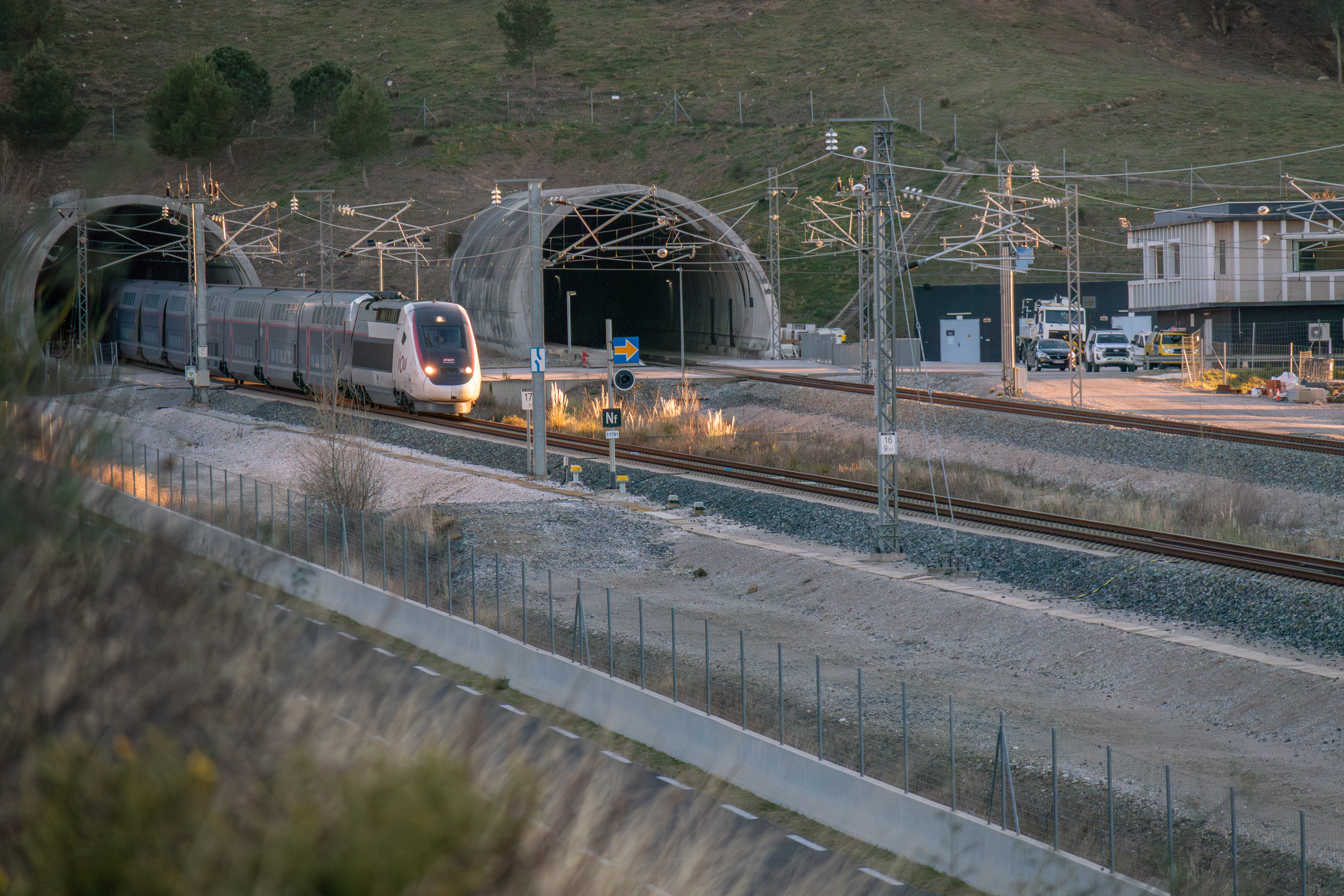
A Euroduplex train exiting from the French side of the Perthus Tunnel.

An international tunnel is a subterranean passage that crosses a border between two sovereign states.

== Operational ==
Name	Type	Location	Length	Opened	Notes
Albert-II Tunnel	Road	France – Monaco	1.734 km (1.077 mi)	2016	Unidirectional tunnel from France to Monaco, though traffic can be reversed when necessary.
Aragnouet-Bielsa Tunnel	Road	France – Spain	3.070 km (1.908 mi)	1976	Crosses under the Pyrenees to connect Aragnouet, France, to Bielsa, Spain.
Channel Tunnel	Rail	United Kingdom – France	50.46 km (31.35 mi)	1994	Connects Folkestone, UK, to Coquelles, France. Carries passengers and road freight via LeShuttle.
China–Laos Railway Friendship Tunnel	Rail	China – Laos	9.950 km (6.183 mi)	2021	Connects Mohan, Yunnan, China, to Boten, Laos.
Col de Tende Road Tunnel	Road	Italy – France	3.182 km (1.977 mi)	1882	Crosses the Col de Tende from Limone Piemonte, Italy, to Tende, France.
Detroit–Windsor Tunnel	Road	United States – Canada	1.57 km (0.98 mi)	1930	Connects Detroit, Michigan, to Windsor, Ontario.
Fréjus Rail Tunnel	Rail	France – Italy	13.7 km (8.5 mi)	1871	Crosses the Cottian Alps under the Col du Fréjus to connect Modane, France, to Bardonecchia, Italy. Uses the same route as the Fréjus Road Tunnel.
Fréjus Road Tunnel	Road	France – Italy	12.87 km (8.00 mi)	1980	Crosses the Cottian Alps under the Col du Fréjus to connect Modane, France, to Bardonecchia, Italy. Uses the same route as the Fréjus Rail Tunnel.
Great St Bernard Tunnel	Road	Italy – Switzerland	5.798 km (3.603 mi)	1964	Connects Saint-Rhémy-en-Bosses, Italy, to Bourg-Saint-Pierre, Switzerland.
Karawanks Tunnel (motorway)	Road	Austria – Slovenia	8.138 km (5.057 mi)	1991	Connects Sankt Jakob im Rosental, Austria, to Hrušica, Jesenice, Slovenia.
Karawanks Tunnel (railway)	Rail	Austria – Slovenia	8.176 km (5.080 mi)	1906	Connects Rosenbach, Austria, to Jesenice, Slovenia.
Loibl Tunnel	Road	Austria – Slovenia	1.570 km (0.976 mi)	1944	Built during World War II to connect Ferlach, Austria, and Tržič, Slovenia.
Michigan Central Railway Tunnel	Rail	United States – Canada	2.6 km (1.6 mi)	1910	Connects Detroit, Michigan, to Windsor, Ontario.
Mont Blanc Tunnel	Road	France – Italy	11.611 km (7.215 mi)	1965	Connects Chamonix, France, to Courmayeur, Italy.
Mont-d'Or Tunnel	Rail	France – Switzerland	6.098 km (3.789 mi)	1915	Connects Frasne, France, to Vallorbe, Switzerland.
Perthus Tunnel	Rail	France – Spain	8.3 km (5.2 mi)	2010	Connects Montesquieu-des-Albères, France, to La Jonquera, Spain under the Pyrenees.
Rainier-III Tunnel	Road	Monaco – France	1.56 km (0.97 mi)	1994	Unidirectional tunnel from Monaco to France.
Roki Tunnel	Road	Georgia – Russia	3.730 km (2.318 mi)	1984	Completed by the Soviet Union government to connect South Ossetia, Georgia, to North Ossetia, Russia. It was reconstructed due to damage caused by the 2008 Russo-Georgian War and was reopened in 2015.
Sainte-Dévote railway tunnel	Rail	France – Monaco	5.737 km (3.565 mi)	1964	The only railway tunnel in Monaco, which connects it to France.
Simplon Tunnel	Rail	Switzerland – Italy	19.803 km (12.305 mi)	1906	Connects Brig, Switzerland, to the Iselle di Trasquera railway station, Italy.
Somport Road Tunnel	Road	Spain – France	8.602 km (5.345 mi)	2003	Crosses the Col du Somport through the Pyrenees to connect Canfranc, Spain, to Urdos, France.
Somport Railway Tunnel	Road	Spain – France	7.874 km (4.893 mi)	1928	Crosses the Pyrenees to connect Canfranc, Spain, to Urdos, France. Was active as a railway tunnel until 1970 when a section of the line was destroyed. It stayed out of use until 2003, when it was converted to an emergency road tunnel to serve the adjoining Somport Road Tunnel.
St. Clair Tunnel	Rail	United States – Canada	1.836 km (1.141 mi)	1891	Connects Port Huron, Michigan, to Sarnia, Ontario.
Tunnel of Christ the Redeemer	Road	Argentina – Chile	3.080 km (1.914 mi)	1980	Crosses the Principal Cordillera of the Andes between Mendoza Province, Argentina, and Valparaíso Region, Chile.

== Non-operational ==
Name	Type	Location	Length	Opened	Closed	Notes
Hoffelt Tunnel	Canal	Luxembourg – Belgium	2.5 km (1.6 mi)	—	—	Unfinished tunnel intended to connect Hoffelt, Luxembourg, to Buret, Belgium as part of the Meuse-Moselle Canal. Construction began in 1829 but was abandoned following the Belgian Revolution.
Huldange Tunnel	Rail	Belgium – Luxembourg	0.8 km (0.50 mi)	1899	1962	Connected Burg-Reuland, Belgium, to Troisvierges, Luxembourg.
Port de Rat Tunnel	Road	France – Andorra	1.2 km (0.75 mi)	—	—	Incomplete and abandoned tunnel project intended to connect Auzat, France, to Ordino, Andorra.

== Under construction ==
Name	Type	Location	Length	Work began	Expected opening	Notes
Brenner Base Tunnel	Rail	Austria – Italy	64 km (40 mi)	2008	2032	Will connect Innsbruck, Austria, and Franzensfeste, Italy.
Fehmarn Belt fixed link	Rail, Road	Denmark – Germany	17.6 km (10.9 mi)	2021	2031	Will cross the Fehmarn Belt to connect Lolland, Denmark, to Fehmarn, Germany, two islands in the Baltic Sea.
Mont d'Ambin Base Tunnel	Rail	France – Italy	57.5 km (35.7 mi)	2002	2033	Will connect Maurienne, France, and the Susa Valley, Italy.

== Proposed and planned ==
Name	Type	Location	Planned length	Notes
Agua Negra Tunnel	Road	Argentina – Chile	14 km (8.7 mi)	Would pass through the Andes. Proposed for the deepest part of the tunnel is the Agua Negra Deep Experiment Site, an underground laboratory which would be the first in the Southern Hemisphere.
Bering Strait crossing	Unknown	Russia – United States	Unknown	Would span the Bering Strait to connect the Chukchi Peninsula, Russia, to the Seward Peninsula, Alaska. Several proposals have been made since the late 19th century, though none have proceeded past a conceptual stage.
Concordia Tunnel	Unknown	Bolivia – Pacific Ocean	150 km (93 mi)	Would run between Bolivia and an artificial island in the Pacific Ocean, off the coast of Chile/Peru, at an unspecified location.
Gulf of Paria crossing	Unknown	Trinidad and Tobago – Venezuela	Unknown	Hypothetical bridge or tunnel that would span the Gulf of Paria, with both proposed routes ending in Venezuela.
Helsinki–Tallinn Tunnel	Rail	Estonia – Finland	Unknown	Undersea tunnel that would span the Gulf of Finland to connect Ülemiste, Estonia, to Helsinki, Finland. The length would depend on the route taken, but the shortest distance across would have a length of 80 km (50 mi). A pre-feasibility study was completed in 2015.
Japan–Korea Undersea Tunnel	Unknown	Japan – South Korea	Unknown	Would span the Korea Strait. No serious proposals have been considered, so specific locations in either country have not been determined.
Ore Mountains Tunnel	Rail	Germany – Czechia	30.4 km (18.9 mi)	A base tunnel that would run under the Ore Mountains from Heidenau station, Germany, to Chabařovice, Czech Republic.
Paso Las Leñas Tunnel	Road	Argentina – Chile	13 km (8.1 mi)	Would connect Mendoza Province, Argentina, to the O'Higgins Region, Chile.
Singapore Strait crossing	Unknown	Singapore – Indonesia	Unknown	Hypothetical crossing that would span the Singapore Strait to connect Singapore and the Riau Archipelago, Indonesia.
Strait of Gibraltar Tunnel	Rail	Spain – Morocco	65 km (40 mi)	Would span the Strait of Gibraltar. Work is proposed to begin in 2030.
Tetovo-Prizren Tunnel	Road	North Macedonia – Kosovo	6.4 km (4.0 mi)	Planned tunnel to connect Tetovo, North Macedonia, to Prizren, Kosovo.

== Non-transport and other tunnels ==
Name	Location	Length	Notes
Ems-Dollart Crossing	Germany – Netherlands	4.016 km (2.495 mi)	Unidirectional gas pipeline tunnel opened in 2010 connecting Knock, Germany, to Borgsweer, Netherlands.
Gaza Strip smuggling tunnels	Egypt – Palestine	Variable	Network of smuggling tunnels beneath the Philadelphi Corridor used to bypass the blockade of the Gaza Strip. Most of the tunnels were destroyed by the Egyptian Armed Forces in 2013–2014.
Large Hadron Collider Tunnel	Switzerland – France	26.7 km (16.6 mi)	Circular particle accelerator tunnel at CERN that crosses the border multiple times underground.
Third Tunnel of Aggression	North Korea – South Korea	1.635 km (1.016 mi)	Incomplete military tunnel near Panmunjom which now operates as a tourist site.
Tunnel 57	East Germany – West Germany	0.145 km (0.090 mi)	Tunnel under the Berlin Wall that facilitated the escape of 57 citizens from East Berlin to West Berlin.

== See also ==
- List of international bridges
