= Friendship Bridge (Germany-France) =

Coordinates: 49.1569°N 7.0319°E

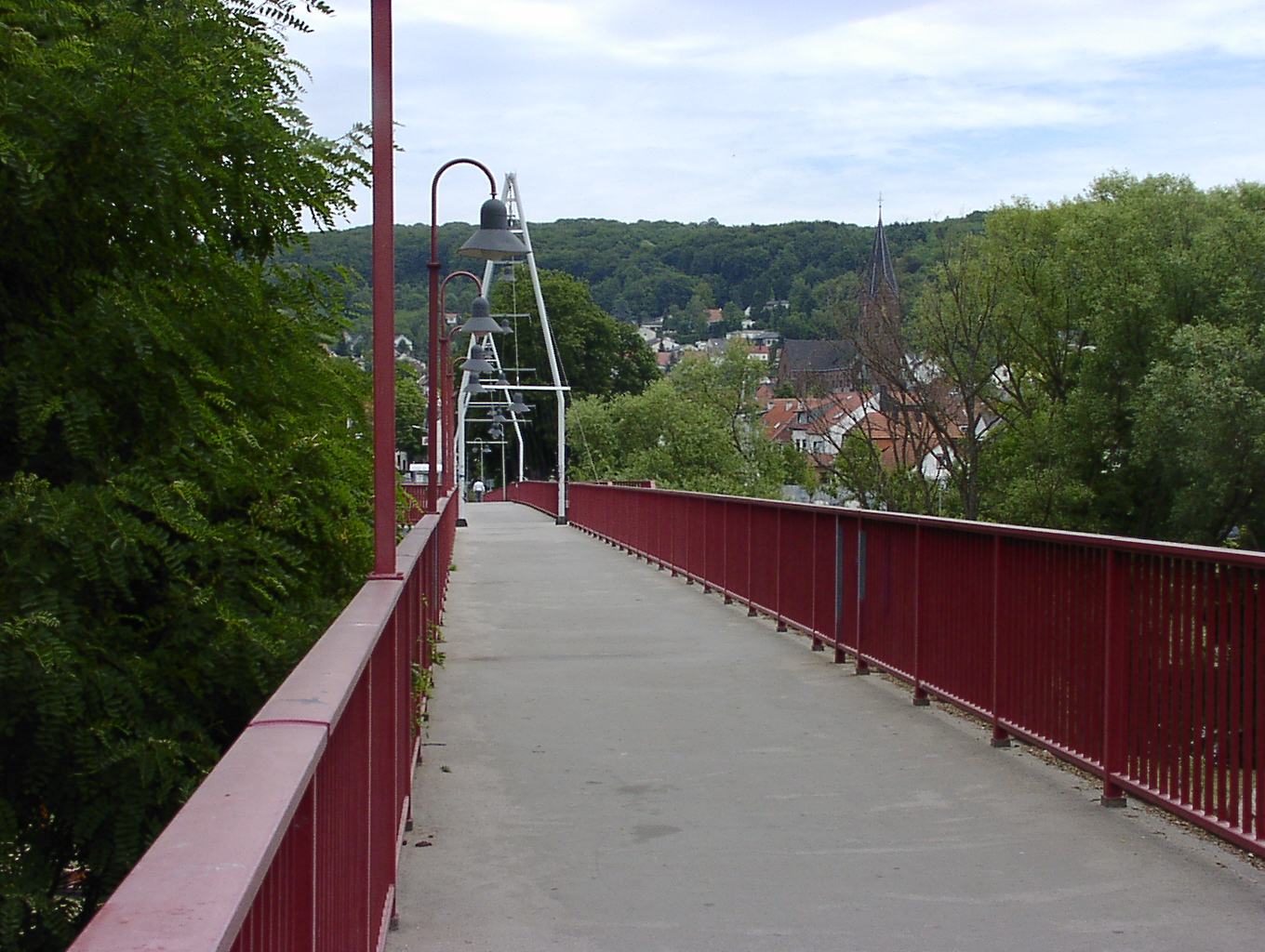
The new Friendship Bridge of 1993

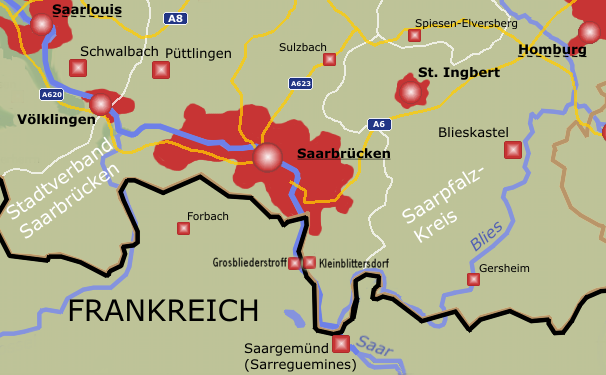
Position of Grosbliederstroff and Kleinblittersdorf

The Friendship Bridge (German: Freundschaftsbrücke, French: Pont de l'amitié) is a bridge which crosses the Saar river, south of Saarbrücken, and links the Saarland municipality of Kleinblittersdorf with the Lorraine commune of Grosbliederstroff.

Although the idea of having a bridge between the two places, linked with each other for centuries, originated in the 1860s, the bridge was in fact first built in 1880. Having been destroyed at the beginning of the Second World War, it was newly built in 1964. The bridge's current form as a footbridge was constructed in 1993.

While it impresses neither through architectural boldness nor through record breaking dimensions, the varied history of Franco-German relations, from "hereditary enmity" to a strong partnership within the European Union, can be interpreted through the bridge, especially since the 1963 Élysée Treaty came into force. While at times the bridge served as a border crossing between France and Germany, between these times it shifted between being seen as either an inner-German or an inner-French work of construction.

== First Bridge in 1880 ==
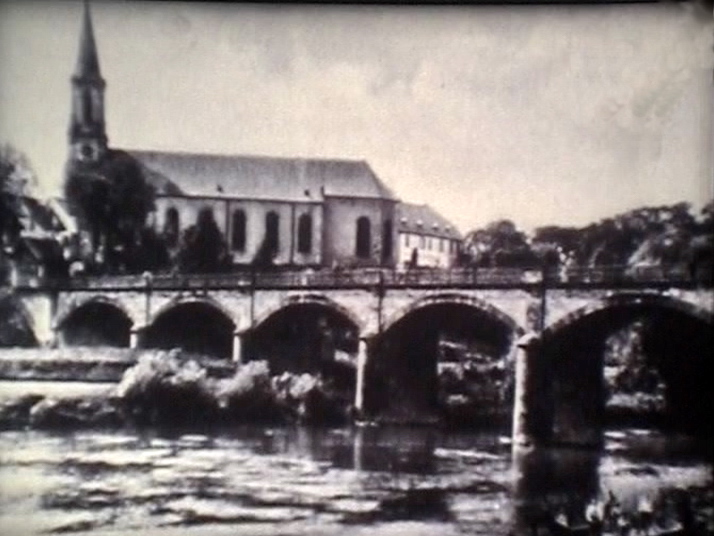
Five-Arch Stone Bridge Construction, 1880–1939

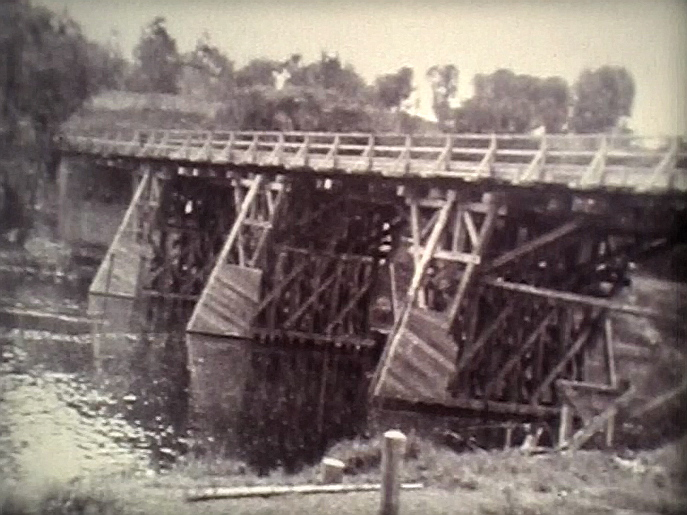
Wooden Makeshift Bridge, 1940–1944

In the Middle Ages and in the early Modern Era, Groß- and Kleinblittersdorf were two districts of the Lorraine village of Bliederstorff (first documented in the year 777) on opposite banks of the Saar river. The prefixes Groß- (meaning big in German) and Klein- (meaning small) for the respective districts first appeared at the end of the 16th Century, and were simply an indicator of their different population sizes. Separated by the resolutions of the Congress of Vienna, both districts belonged to the German Empire after the Franco-Prussian War of 1871, although to different states (Großblittersdorf to the Imperial Territory of Alsace-Lorraine, Kleinblittersdorf to the Prussian Rhine Province). From 1919, Großblittersdorf was once again a municipality in France, while Kleinblittersdorf was located in the League of Nations controlled Saarland region as a result of the Treaty of Versailles, and from 1935 in the Third Reich. From 1940 until the end of the Second World War, they were both again under German rule. Whereas in 1956, like from 1919 until 1935, both places were again under French influence: Grosbliederstroff (as it is now known) as a municipality in the Moselle department and Kleinblittersdorf in the semi-autonomous Saarland, which was incorporated into the Federal Republic of Germany on 1 January 1957 due to the Saar Treaty.

In the Middle Ages and the early Modern Era there were of course no structural river crossings. It is assumed that crossing the Saar, which had not yet been canalised, was initially made possible with the help of a ford and later a ferryman with a dugout canoe. It was not until 1868 that the idea of the bridge was embraced. The initial idea sought to construct a pier between a small river island in the Saar and the parallel lock canal (part of the Saar Canal), which was built in the years 1862–1879. Initiatives by the Mayor of Grosbliederstroff were repeatedly rejected by the Metz prefecture. It is not known whether there were attempts to also contact the responsible Prussian authorities on the Saar's eastern bank. However, it was not until soon after the war of 1870/71 that the planning of the project properly began. At this time there was clearly a large need for a further river crossing between Saarbrücken and Saareguemines, as many workers from the towns to the left of the Saar found employment in the factories in the district of Brebach, which today is in the south-east of Saarbrücken. In addition, the Saar was no longer a border river, rather it was located on German territory. Therefore, any of the German military personnel's fears that such a structure would make it easier for troops of the "hereditary enemy" France to cross the border into German territory became irrelevant.

In August 1968, the company Richard Schmidt in Luisenthal was commissioned to build a stone arch bridge with six pillars. On 1 October 1880, the bridge, despite having had no railing installed before the official opening, was initially approved for pedestrians and from January 1881 also approved for vehicles. Part of the construction costs were covered through the paying of a toll, and toll booths were built on both bridgeheads for this purpose. Commuters on the western bank of the Saar now had greater access to the Kleinblittersdorf train station on the important Saarbrücken-Saareguemines railway line, which was much easier and faster to reach than the previous ferry service. The new crossing additionally offered residents the welcomed opportunity to visit and to run errands in the other district.

On 9 September 1939, shortly after the outbreak of the Second World War, the French Military demolished the bridge, so that in the event of a German attack between the Siegfried Line and the Maginot Line, it would be harder to cross the Saar. When Germany actually attacked France half a year later, the Wehrmacht erected a wooden makeshift bridge in this position, which was again destroyed after the Battle of Normandy in the latter half of 1944.

== "Friendship Bridge" ==
After the end of the war, only a small passenger ferry connected the two places for many years. This was the situation despite the France-Germany reconciliation, which has taken place particularly since Jean Monnet's Europe Declaration on 9 May 1950 as part of Western European integration through practical cooperation in the Council of Europe (which Germany joined in 1951), the European Coal and Steel Community (from 1952), and the European Economic Community (from 1958). This intensified the relations between the two countries, though at first only a little. During the reconstruction period, the construction of a new bridge and thus an additional permanent border crossing, especially one that was so close to Saarbrücken, was not on the political agenda for the Metz prefecture or for the Saarland governments under Minister-President Johannes Hoffmann and his successors.

=== Bridge of 1964 ===
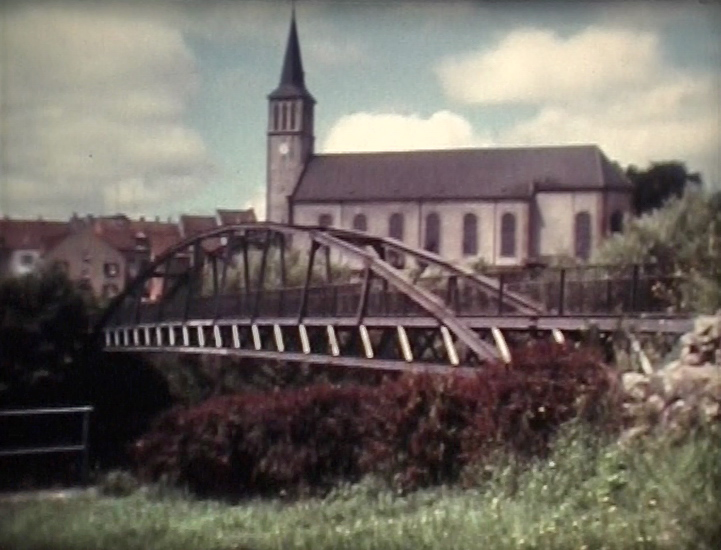
The Friendship Bridge from 1964 to 1993, viewed from the German side. In the background is Saint-Innocent, Grosbliederstroff

This only changed after the German Chancellor Adenauer and French President de Gaulle signed the Élysée Treaty in 1963, which became known as the German-French Friendship Treaty. Apart from regulating foreign and domestic affairs as well as politics regarding the youth and culture, this agreement combined with the establishment of a Youth Office, facilitated a variety of transboundary initiatives on a regional and local level. Thus, Kleinblittersdorf and Grosbliederstroff did not only become sister cities very early on, but they also negotiated the construction of a new Saar bridge between the two municipalities in 1964, thus creating a new border crossing. However, it was not the first bridge to exist in this place. In fact, the main body of the bridge was built on top of the "Bridge of Sighs" (German: Kummersteg), a steel arch bridge of approximately 4 meters width, which had been located in the regional capital until the beginning of 1962 and was replaced by a new construction (Wilhelm-Heinrich-Brücke), and was brought to a new purpose. An approximately 2 meter wide part of wood and steel construction had to be added to the last section of the bridge over the river Saar, parallel to the Canal de la Sarre (German: Saarkanal) on the French side, because the original bridge was too short. In 1981, there was one more modification in the same place. The increase of the bridge's height enabled the passage of larger riverboats up to Sarreguemines past the otherwise non-navigable canal of the river Saar in this area.

However, the bridge was not given the name "Friendship Bridge" (German: Freundschaftsbrücke French: Pont de l'amitié) until 1968.

=== Bridge of 1993 ===
Given its old age, further maintenance and repair of the bridge soon turned out to be uneconomic. Laid-out as a pedestrian bridge, the Friendship Bridge only carried an urban importance initially. The necessity to facilitate the border-crossing of goods and passenger trafficking in this spot was already seen in the 1970s, as all suitable border crossings for motor traffic to France at Rilchingen-Hanweiler and Saarbrücken-Güdingen were too far away and would have required cross-town links. The solution was a road bridge (German: Abt-Fulrad-Brücke (Kleinblittersdorf)), which was built at the beginning of the 1980s, connecting the B-51 with the Route nationale 61 (or respectively the Départementale 31) connecting the distributor road to the autobahn Saarbrücken-Paris (French: Autoroute A 320) near Forbach - which parallels the B-51 on the west bank. It crosses the river Saar only a few kilometers south of Auersmacher (a district of Kleinblittersdorf). Additionally, the recently finished building project Bypass B-51 of the Kleinblittersdorf municipality crossing under the old bridge required a larger overhead clearance. These were the frame conditions for the necessary replacement construction of the pedestrian connection of both town centres. Construction began at the end of 1992 and the inauguration followed on 12 September 1993 by the respective mayors, Günther Brettar (Kleinblittersdorf) and Jean Jung (Grosbliederstroff), as well as the environment minister of the Saarland region, Jo Leinen. The old bridge, which was only a few meters away, was not removed until after this event because it allowed around 800 pedestrians to cross over every day during the construction work.

The new three-bay bridge has a width of 3.5 m, a length of 140.2 m and consists of a river bridge and an outland bridge. The river bridge features open spans ranging between 58.8 m and 65.9 m. It has a haunched steel composite construction with a box girder cross section, whose overall height varies between 1.5 m at the abutment and 3.5 m over the river piers. The outland bridge has a span of 14.2 m and a reinforced concrete superstructure. The building costs added up to 4 million DM ("German marks"). The offices responsible for the architectural planning were Andree from Dillingen and Dincher from Saarbrücken, whereas the companies Modernbau (formerly a subsidiary of Bilflinger + Berger) and Dillinger Stahlbau (English: steel construction) were responsible for the bridge's construction.

The filigree bridge is eye-catching, thanks to its burgundy painted metal railing and the historically arched lamp posts with their bell-shaped lamps. This impression is made even stronger by two silver, pointedly arched, non-structural light-metal pylons, which tower over the walkway like two Gothic archways. Between their pinnacles, additional lamps hang from a support cable, which is an added symbol of the uniting nature of the bridge. Due to building laws, the pylon stands on the "French half" of the bridge inside the balustrade whereas on the German side it is attached on the outside. The electrical power supply is provided by the French company EDF and is paid for by the municipality Grosbliederstroff.

The 40th anniversary celebration of this first post-war bridge construction was held on 5 May 2004 by several hundred official representatives from 77 municipalities and communal organisations which came from the greater area of Saarbrücken/East Moselle to honour the occasion: In the very middle of the bridge they signed a resolution, containing further goals of border-crossing collaboration in this "Eurodistrict" within the Euroregion SaarLorLux.

== Cultural aspects ==
In 1987, the Kleinblittersdorf municipality mounted a piece of plastic art by Wolfram Huschens, a German artist from the Saarland region, made from copper sheets on a glacial erratic at the eastern end of the roadbridge B51/N61 next to the custom clearance site which had been rendered redundant by the Schengen Agreement (1985). The statue displays two intertwining, incomplete wheel-like bodies, symbolising the historical conflict and cooperation of the French and German regions neighbouring each other. The work is titled "Border between Germany and France".

On the occasion of the anniversary of the German liberation on 8 May 2007, the first four stations of the projects of the cultural capitals called hArt an der Grenze (English: close to the limit) were opened between Kleinblittersdorf and Grosbliederstroff, displaying artistic works on the bridge and the former border hut until the end of August 2007. The project included objects like life-sized photographs of artists wearing the uniforms of former customs officers and a performance by Bernd Wegener called "Le son du vent" (English: The sound of the wind) for which bells had been hung between the similarly shaped lamps on the bridge.

In 1982, the local Carnival society called "Grünschnäbel" (English: green beaks) declared the only 30 m^{2} (during low tide) wide river Saar-islet between the two municipalities to be the "Free State Carnevalis", holding annual ceremonies there, rewarding celebrities like Willy Millowitsch, Oskar Lafontaine, Ephraim Kishon, Lilo Pulver and Wim Thoelke with the title of Doctor humoris causa. This often made it necessary for the participants of the title bestowal to wear rubber boots while the audience could watch the ceremony from the bridge, keeping their feet dry. In 2007, the event took place for the last time, due to the ageing process of the "Grünschnäbel", possibly the future owners of this "free state", which was auctioned off in June and July 2007, might continue to put it to public use.

== Other Saarland–Lorraine Friendship Bridges ==
It was not until the May 2004 act that the bridge became a symbol of cooperation between the two former enemy nations and also a model for further "bridges of friendship" between Saarland and Lorraine with a similar history:

- Between the German Großrosseln and the French Petite-Rosselle, in the early modern age still known as Rosseln, there is a bridge with the same name which crosses the Rossel river, on which the residents of both places have celebrated a neighbourhood festival every year since 1980.
- In 1990, a Friendship Bridge was built between the German Fürweiler and the French Schwerdorff. This bridge also replaced a predecessor, which was destroyed in 1944, and connects the two places, which have been separated by changed borders since 1816, across the Diersdorfer Brook.
- Lastly, a "European Friendship Bridge" crosses the Blies between Germany's Habkirchen and France's Frauenberg.

== See also ==
- List of international bridges
