= Unity Bridge 2 =

Bridge and border crossing between Tanzania and Mozambique

- Coordinates: 11°34′46″S 35°25′47″E
- Crosses: Ruvuma River
- Locale: Unango, Mozambique; Limpambara, Tanzania

The Unity Bridge 2 is an international bridge and border crossing between Kivikoni, Songea Rural District in Tanzania and Lupilichi in Mozambique.

== See also ==
- List of international bridges
