= Nadicorp =

Malaysian bus operator

Nadicorp Holdings Sdn Bhd
- Company type: Private Limited Company
- Industry: Public transport operation, manufacturing, property
- Founded: July 1998
- Headquarters: Kuala Lumpur, Malaysia
- Area served: Klang Valley, Malaysia
- Key people: Tan Sri Dato Sri Mohd Nadzmi Mohd Salleh, Chairman
- Products: public buses transport, management of terminal
- Website: http://www.nadi.com.my

Nadicorp Holdings Sdn Bhd (Nadicorp) has grown to become one of Malaysia's premier private conglomerates.

== Transport ==
Nadicorp is a private company which was formed in 1998 and expanded to become Malaysia largest bus operators which it runs via its subsidiary Konsortium Transnasional Bhd.

Its operations are divided into two categories, namely express buses' and stage or local buses which are operated under the brandname Cityliner.
