= 2013 IMT-GT Cup =

- Founded: 2013
- Region: Asean
- Number of teams: 6
- Current champions: Kedah FA
- Most successful club(s): Kedah FA (1 title)

The 2013 IMT-GT Cup or IMT-GT Friendship Football 2013 was invited association football tournament that featured six teams and was staged on 23 September 2013 to 29 September 2013 in Satun, Thailand. T

he competition was organised and promoted by Indonesia–Malaysia–Thailand Growth Triangle (IMT-GT) under Thailand, ministry of sports and tourism with ASEAN Football Federation (ASEAN) collaboration. The champion, Kedah FA defeated Songkhla United FC in the final 2–1.

== Winners ==
2013 IMT-GT Cup

Kedah FA
First Title

== See also ==
- IMT-GT
- ASEAN
