= Cambodia–Laos–Vietnam Development Triangle Area =

Trilateral cooperation initiative

The Cambodia–Laos–Vietnam Development Triangle Area (CLV-DTA; Khmer: តំបន់ត្រីកោណអភិវឌ្ឍន៍ កម្ពុជា–ឡាវ–វៀតណាម; Vietnamese: Tam giác phát triển Việt Nam - Lào - Campuchia) was a growth triangle in the southern part of the Greater Mekong Subregion. The cooperation initiative was initiated in 1999 by the leaders of Cambodia, Laos and Vietnam and formalized in 2004 during the 10th ASEAN Summit in Vientiane.

It aimed to strengthen trilateral cooperation, promote stability and security, reduce poverty and foster socio-economic growth and development of the border regions of the three countries through transportation infrastructure and the promotion of trade, as well as the prevention of natural resource and cross-border crimes.

The CLV-DTA comprised 13 border provinces within the three countries of which four (Ratanakiri, Stung Treng, Kratié and Mondulkiri) are in Cambodia, four (Attapeu, Salavan, Sekong and Champasak) in Laos and five (Kon Tum, Đắk Lắk, Gia Lai, Đắk Nông and Bình Phước) in Vietnam.

Vietnamese businesses have taken the lead in making investments in the triangle area. Since the inauguration of the CLV-DTA, Vietnamese investors have invested in 110 projects worth US$3.7 billion.

The three countries held a ministerial meeting at least annually and a prime ministerial meeting every two years.

In September 2024, Cambodia withdrew from the agreement.

== History ==
On 20 October 1999, the three prime ministers Hun Sen (Cambodia), Sisavath Keobounphanh (Laos) and Phan Văn Khải (Vietnam) held the first unofficial summit in Vientiane and reached an agreement on building a "Development Triangle".

After the third unofficial summit on 20–21 July 2004 in Siem Reap, the three prime ministers Hun Sen, Bounnhang Vorachit and Phan Văn Khải met at Vientiane and declared the establishment of the CLV-DTA. Originally, the development triangle covered 10 border provinces: Mondulkiri, Ratanakiri and Stung Treng of Cambodia, Attapeu, Salavan and Sekong of Laos and Đắk Lắk, Đắk Nông, Gia Lai and Kon Tum of Vietnam.

At the fourth official summit in Da Lat on 4–5 December 2006, the three prime ministers decided to establish the Joint Coordination Committee (JCC) for the CLV-DTA.

At the fourth JCC meeting held in Đắk Lắk on 21–22 December 2009, the three countries agreed to include three more provinces: Kratié of Cambodia, Champasak of Laos and Bình Phước of Vietnam, adding up to a total of 13 border provinces.

In August 2024, Cambodians in countries including South Korea, Japan, France, Canada, Australia and the US held protests against this deal and demanded that the government withdraw. Initially, the government reacted strongly and, authorities arrested nearly 100 people who organized or supported public protests against the CLV-DTA, charging several with plotting against the state within Cambodia. However, on 21 September 2024, the Cambodian government announced its withdrawal from the Cambodia-Laos-Vietnam Development Triangle Area. The decision is seen as a strategic move by the Cambodian government to address national concerns, as various groups in the country alleged that Hun Manet’s government had “ceded 4 provinces” to foreign countries, leading to narratives that have caused unrest. Many observers have noted that this development could be seen as a move on Cambodia’s part to reduce reliance on Vietnam, and to enhance cooperation with China, exemplified by the construction of the Funan Techo Canal.

== See also ==
- Indonesia–Malaysia–Singapore growth triangle (SIJORI)
- Brunei–Indonesia–Malaysia–Philippines East ASEAN Growth Area (BIMP-EAGA)
- Timor Leste–Indonesia–Australia Growth Triangle (TIA-GT)
- Indonesia–Malaysia–Thailand Growth Triangle (IMT-GT)
- Golden triangle
