= Indonesia–Malaysia–Singapore growth triangle =

Growth triangle between Indonesia, Malaysia, and Singapore

The Indonesia–Malaysia–Singapore growth triangle was established in 1994 between three countries (Indonesia, Malaysia and Singapore) to strengthen economic links in the region and optimise the complementarity between the three countries. It started off as the SIJORI Growth Triangle in 1989, which includes Singapore, Johor (Malaysia), and Riau Archipelago, a part of Riau Islands Province (Indonesia).

== History ==
The SIJORI Growth Triangle is a partnership arrangement between Singapore, Johor (in Malaysia), and Riau Islands (in Indonesia) that combines the competitive strengths of the three areas to make the subregion more attractive to regional and international investors. More specifically, it links the infrastructure, capital, and expertise of Singapore with the natural and labour resources and the abundance of land of Johor and Riau.

The SIJORI Growth Triangle was first publicly announced in 1989 by Singapore Deputy Prime Minister Goh Chok Tong. The 'triangle of growth' was envisioned to be a key component of the Singapore regionalisation scheme of the 1980s and 1990s, relocating labour-intensive industries to neighbouring places such as the Malaysian state of Johor (known as the Iskandar Development Region) and the island of Batam in the nearby Indonesian province of Riau (at the time, before splitting off as a part of Riau Islands province in 2004).

As more Malaysian and Indonesian states joined the grouping, the IMS-GT was formed to formalise the new grouping. A Memorandum of Understanding (MOU) was signed on 17 December 1994 by the representatives of the participating countries; Singapore's Deputy Prime Minister Lee Hsien Loong, Malaysia' s International Trade and Industry Minister Datuk Seri Rafidah Aziz and Indonesia's Coordinating Minister for Trade and Industry Hartono.

== Statistics ==
Batam is a tax free export zone rather than a free port, therefore much industry is limited to international exports. Batam has also become an alternate air transport hub as Java's airports are congested. Some 62,000 Singaporeans visited Batam in January 2012, compared with stronger links to Johor, some 70,000 daily.

Administrative division	Area (km^{2})	Population	Density
JOHOR STATE, MALAYSIA
Johor Bahru District	1,066	1,638,219	1,540/km2
Kulai District	756	251,650	332/km2
SINGAPORE
Singapore	716	5,612,300	7,796/km2
RIAU ISLANDS PROVINCE, INDONESIA
Batam City	1,010.88	1,236,399	1,223/km2
Tanjung Pinang City	144.6	204,735	1,415.9/km2
Bintan Regency	1,318.2	154,584	117/km2
Karimun Regency	912.75	227,277	249/km2
Entire Land Area	6,891	9,325,164	1,353/km2

sources: (Budan Pusat Statistik 2010 Census Indonesia, Statistics Singapore, Statistics Malaysia)

- Malaysia 2010 Census for Districts.
- Statistics Indonesia Publikasi Provinsi dan Kabupaten Hasil Sementara SP2010
- April 2012 Civil Survey for Batam.

For GDP stats, Riau Island's Quarterly GDP output was Rp26.510.648,31 mln (Q1/14, US$2.3 billion or US$9 billion annual) Singapore's Quarterly GDP was 95,959.1 mln (Q1/14, $76.57 billion or US$310 billion annual) and Johor Bahru state was RM24,452 per capita (entire 2012, US$26 billion annual).

== See also ==
- Brunei–Indonesia–Malaysia–Philippines East ASEAN Growth Area (BIMP-EAGA)
- Timor Leste–Indonesia–Australia Growth Triangle (TIA-GT)
- Indonesia–Malaysia–Thailand Growth Triangle (IMT-GT)
- Cambodia–Laos–Vietnam Development Triangle Area (CLV-DTA)
- ASEAN kecil, a proposed joint defence scheme for Malaysia, Singapore and Indonesia
- Singapore Strait crossing
- List of metropolitan areas in Indonesia
- Golden triangle
