= Sistem Kenderaan Seremban – Kuala Lumpur =

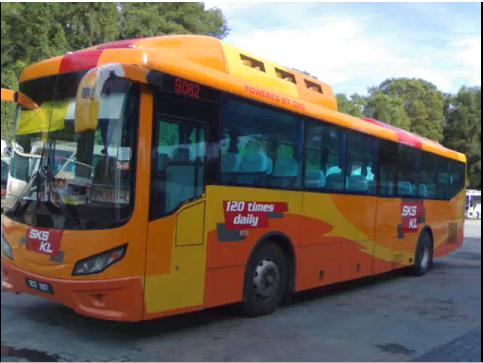
CNG buses.

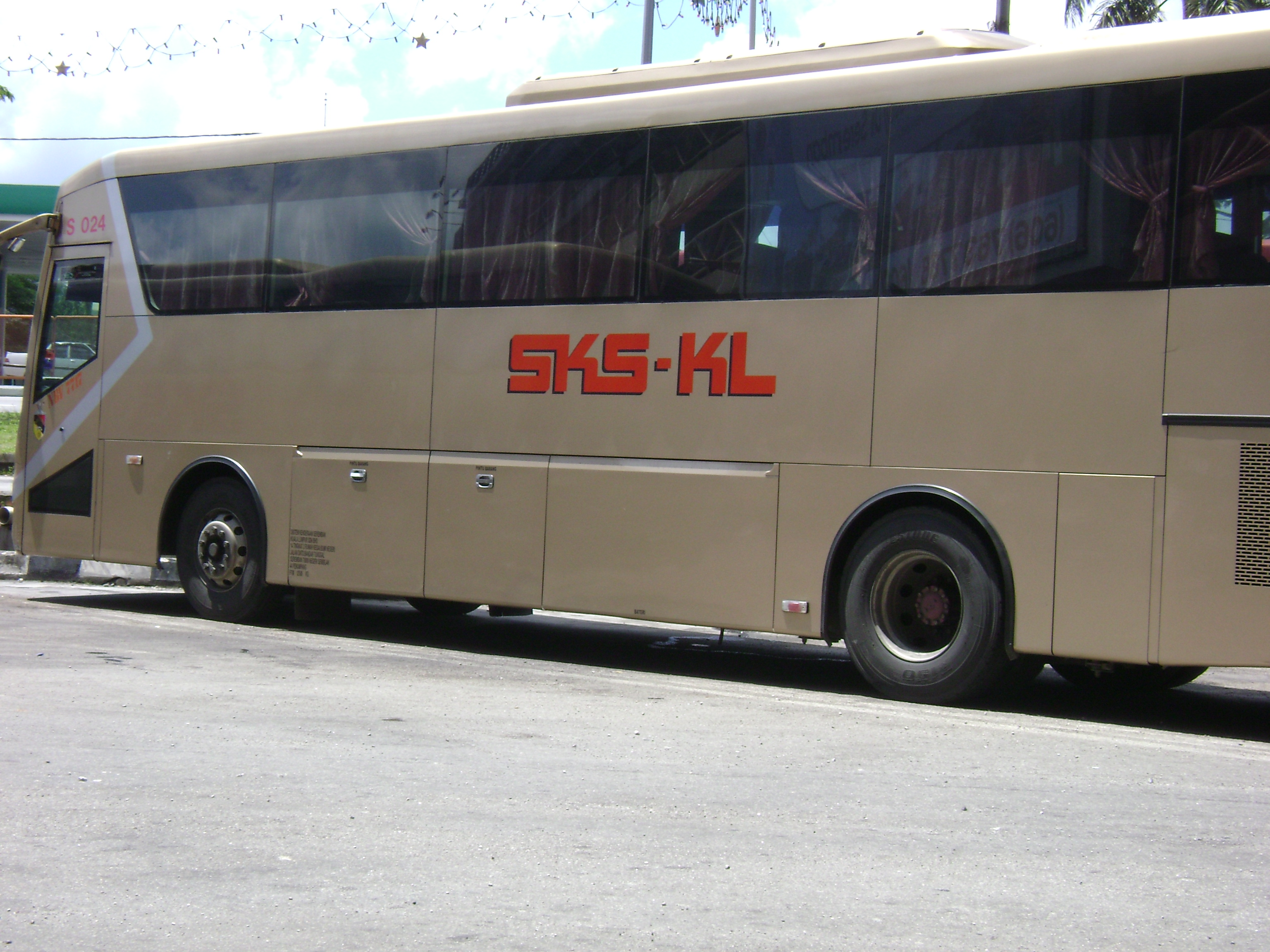

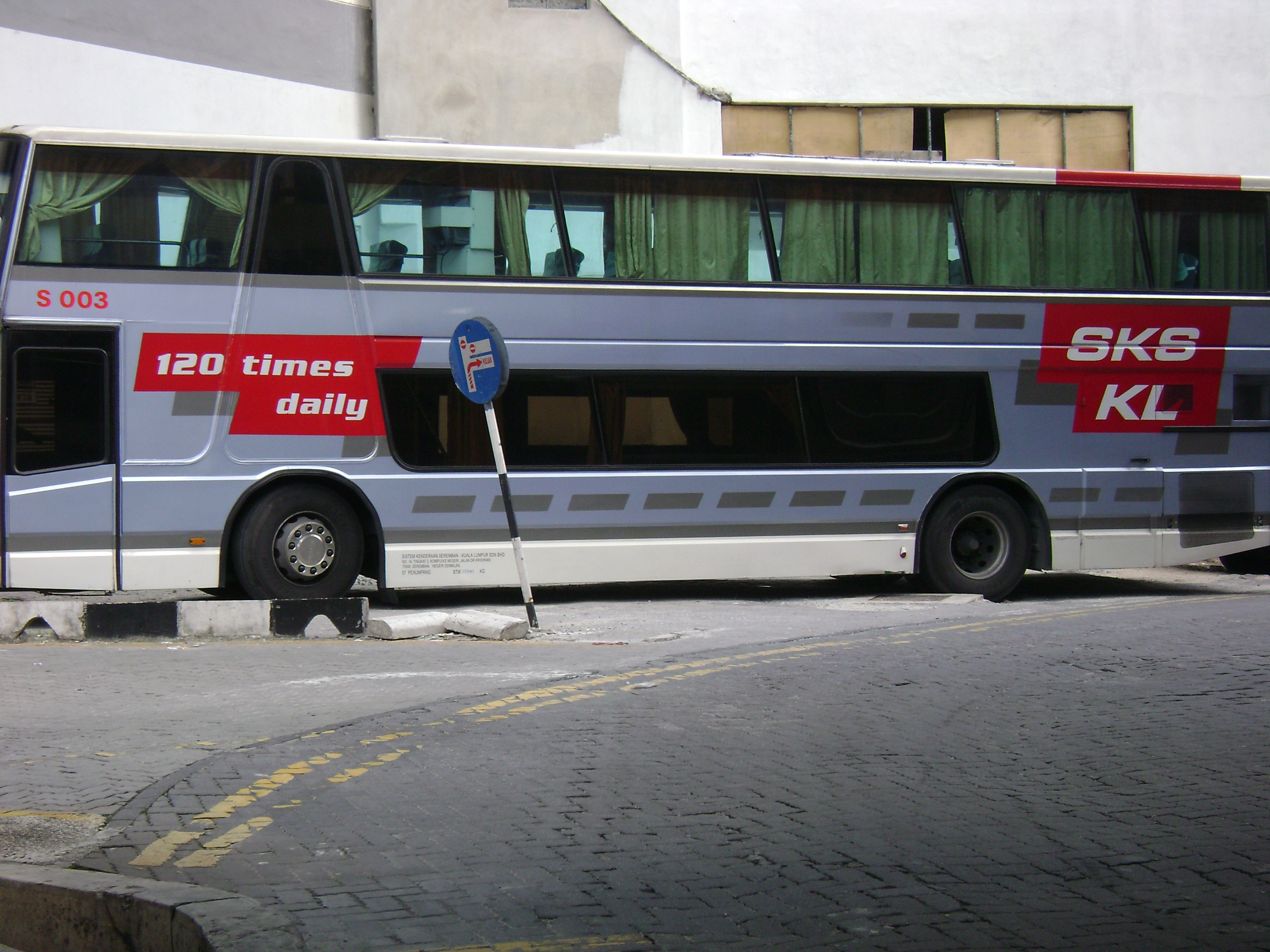

Sistem Kenderaan Seremban – Kuala Lumpur Sdn Bhd (doing business as SKS-KL) is a private transport company owned by Nadi Bhd.

== History ==
It was formed in 1977. It is based in Terminal One Mall, Seremban. It serves as the biggest express bus provider from Seremban to Kuala Lumpur and other destinations. SKS owns a fleet of Nissan Diesel, Hino, Silverbus, Scania AB, Mercedes-Benz and Volvo buses to serve all its routes. Some 5,000 people use SKS services on normal days and double the number on weekends.

== Routes ==
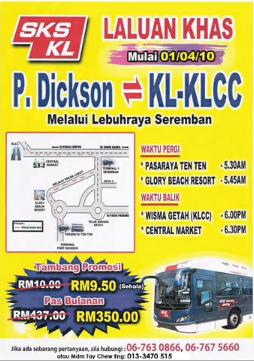
SKS new route.

SKS, a unit of Nadi Corp Holdings Sdn Bhd, operates coach services along the North-South Expressway.

== Fleet ==
As of 2014, these fleet had used intercity coaches (Scania L94IB, Scania K270IB and Scania K320IB).
