= Rhine Bridge =

The Rhine Bridge at Kehl Pont ferroviaire de Kehl Rheinbrücke Kehl
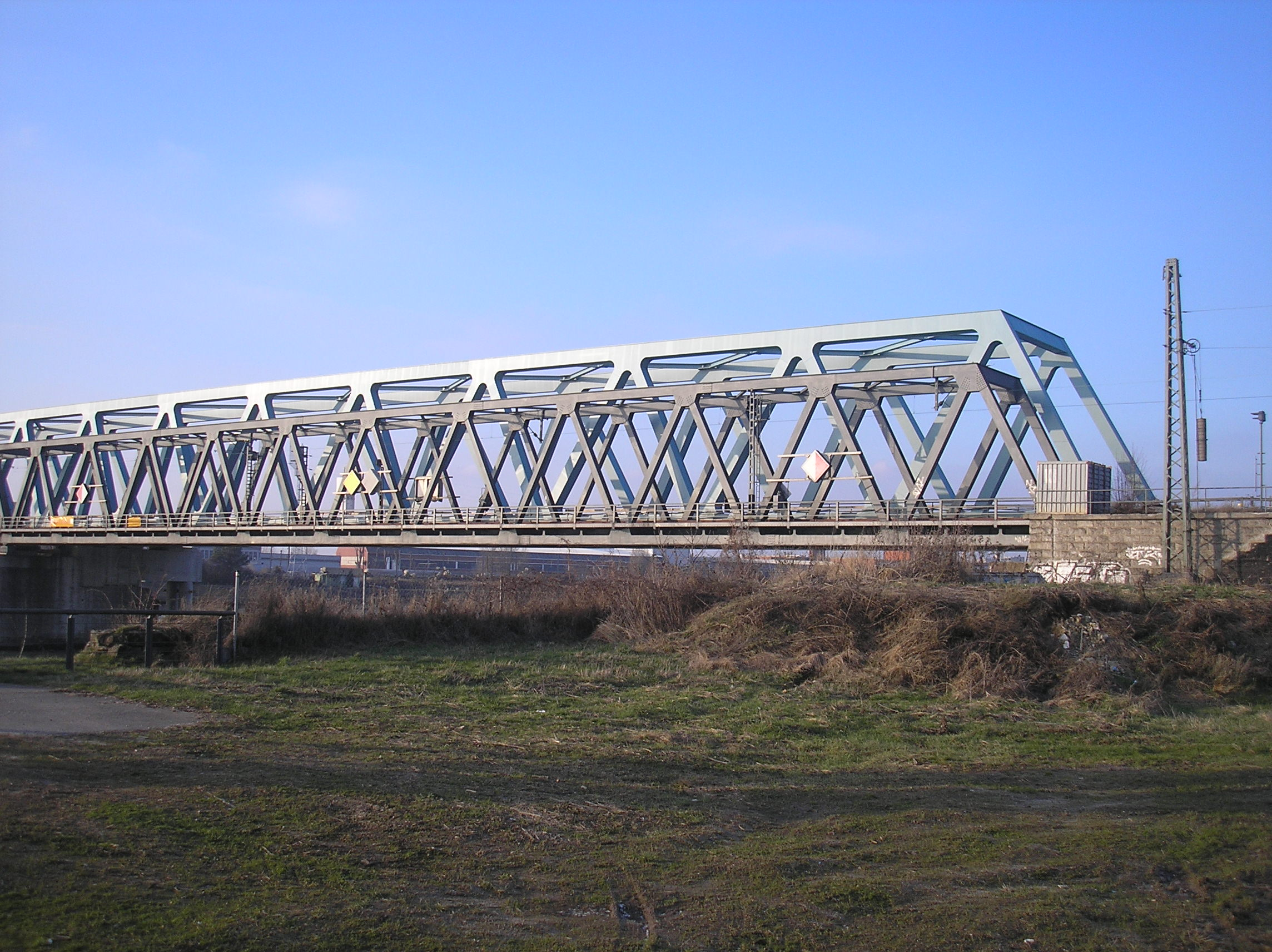
- The bridges of 1956 and 2010
- Coordinates: 48°34′32″N 7°48′3″E
- Carries: Rail traffic
- Crosses: Rhine
- Locale: Strasbourg, France and Kehl, Germany

Characteristics
- Design: Truss bridge
- Total length: 238.4 metres (782 ft)
- Width: 6.66 metres (21.9 ft) (1956–2010); 13 metres (43 ft) (from 2010)
- Height: 8 metres (26 ft) (1956–2010); 12.2 metres (40 ft) (from 2010)

History
- Opened: May 1861 (first railway bridge); December 2010 (most recent bridge)

Location
- Interactive map of The Rhine Bridge at Kehl

The first railway bridge at Kehl across the Rhine was opened in May 1861. Since then the bridge has been partially or fully destroyed more than once.

The Kehl railway bridge constructed in 1956, was a single track railway bridge between Strasbourg and Kehl, crossing in the process both the Rhine and the frontier between Germany and France.

A replacement double track railway bridge was first used on 10 October 2010 and formally opened in December 2010 in order to permit trains to cross the river more rapidly. The speed limit on the new bridge is 160 km/h (100 mph).

== The 1861 bridge ==
Under the terms of an international convention dated 2 July 1857 between Baden and the French government it was agreed that a railway bridge should be constructed across the Rhine between Kehl and Strasbourg. This would be the first permanent bridge across the Upper Rhine.

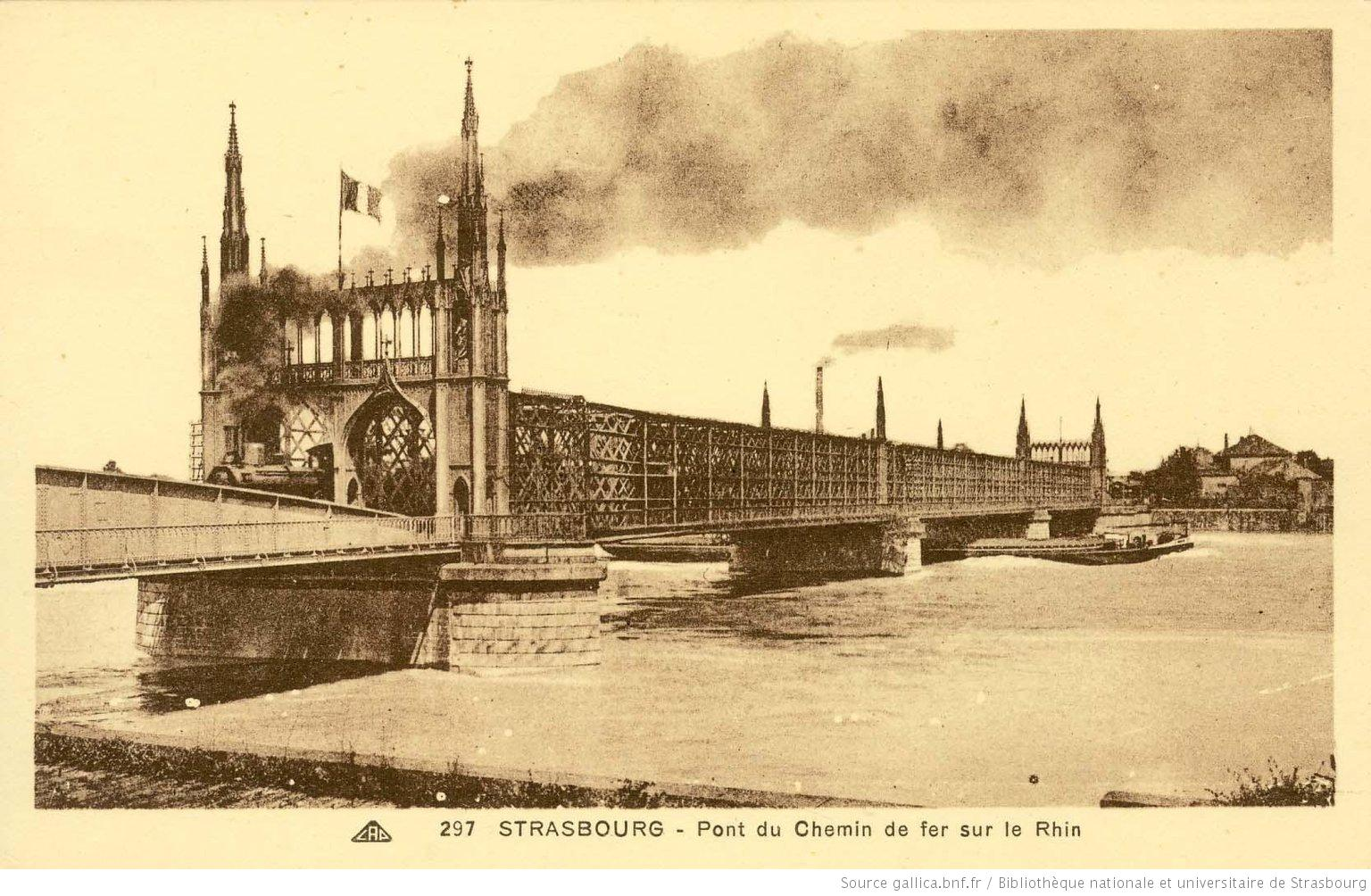
The completed bridge seen in 1920.

The structure would comprise a twin track bridge 253 metres (830 ft) long, with a central truss section of 177 metres (581 ft). On each side of the bridge would be a turntable with 26 metres (85 ft) of usable diameter.

Work began in 1858, the Compagnie des chemins de fer de l'Est taking responsibility for the foundations. In order to sink the piles into the Rhine mud it was necessary to construct protective caissons extending 18 metres (59 ft) below the river level.

The steel superstructure was delivered and assembled by "Gebrüder Benckiser" (Benckiser Brothers), a Pforzheim company. The superstructure weighed approximately 1000 tons, and was assembled on the west (Strasbourg) bank of the river on a site 450 metres (1,480 ft) long.

The bridge became operational on 11 May 1861.

The outbreak in 1870 of the Franco-Prussian War saw the turntable on the eastern (Kehl) end of the bridge dynamited. Until a new steel structure could be erected in 1874, a provisional timber structure was put in place. As a result of the war the frontier moved: between 1871 and 1919 both ends of the bridge were located in and wholly owned by Germany, but in 1919 it was stipulated under the terms of the Treaty of Versailles that the bridge would be wholly owned by France. This was consistent with France's military occupation, under the terms of the treaty, of the formerly German Rhineland: the occupation continued in various forms until 1930.

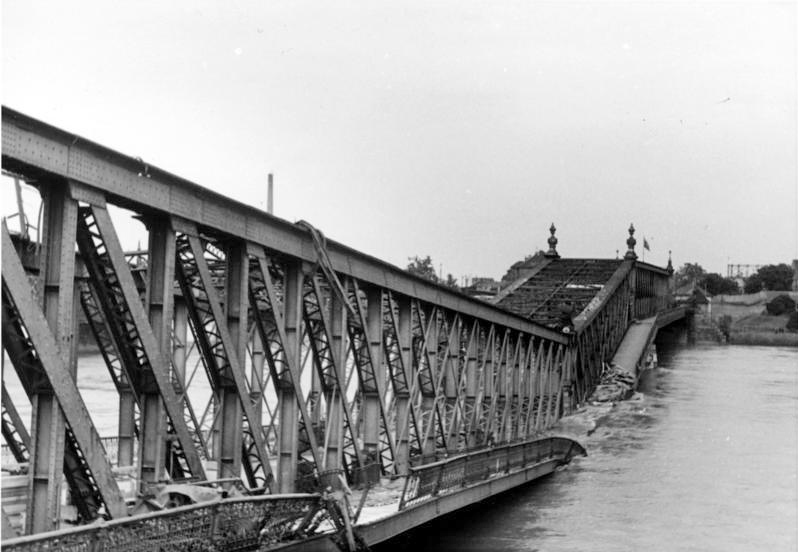
The destroyed bridge in 1940

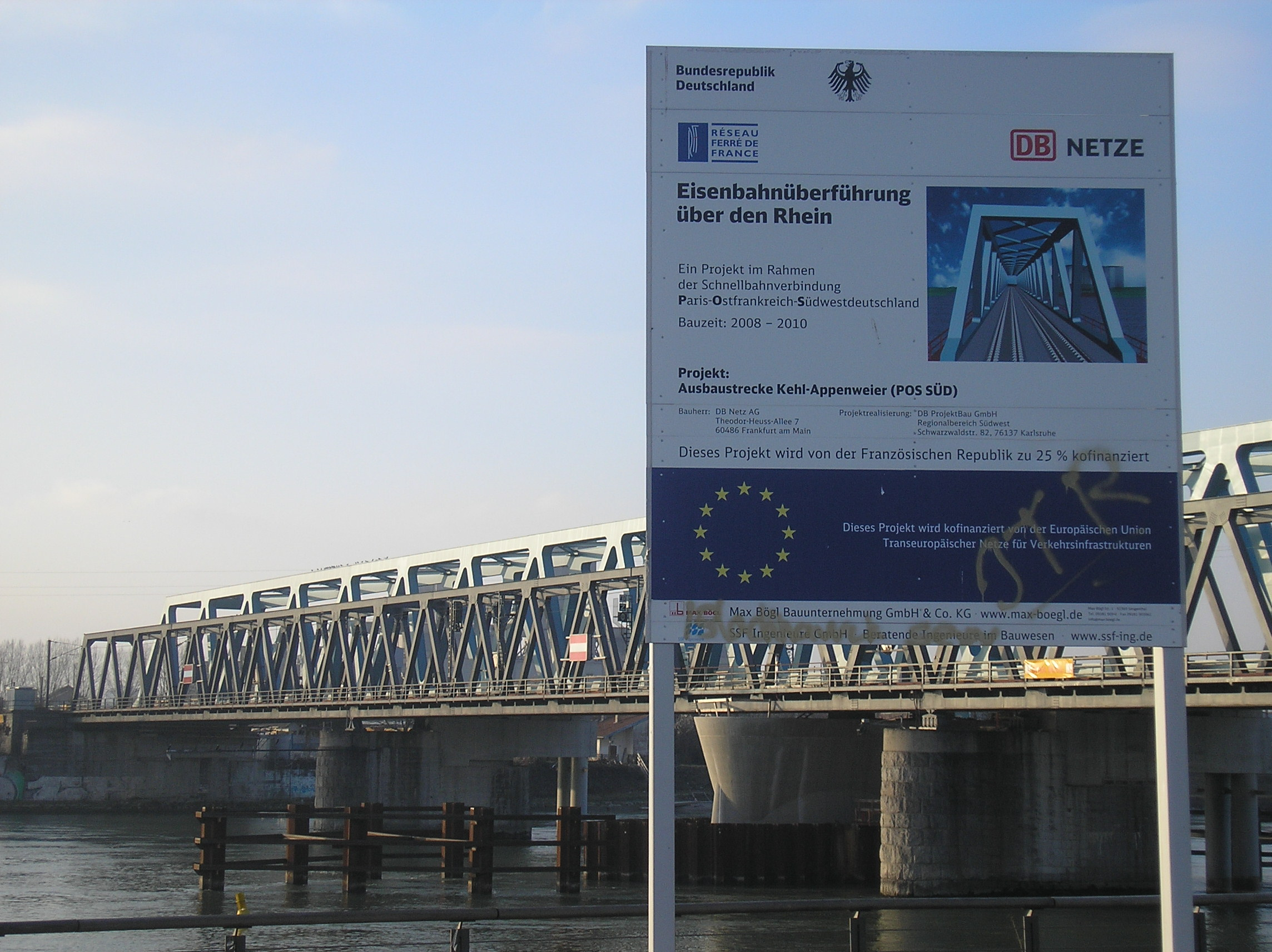
The new bridge shortly before it opened in 2010

By this time a project had reached the planning stage to replace the bridge which by now was more than 75 years old, but no such replacement would be built till well after the Second World War. With the outbreak of war in the late summer of 1939, French troops blew up the bridge's main western support. Until September 1940 the bridge could nevertheless be used courtesy of temporary repairs undertaken. In November 1944 German troops blew up the bridge's main eastern support, effectively destroying the bridge in its totality.

== Replacing the 1861 bridge: the 1956 bridge ==
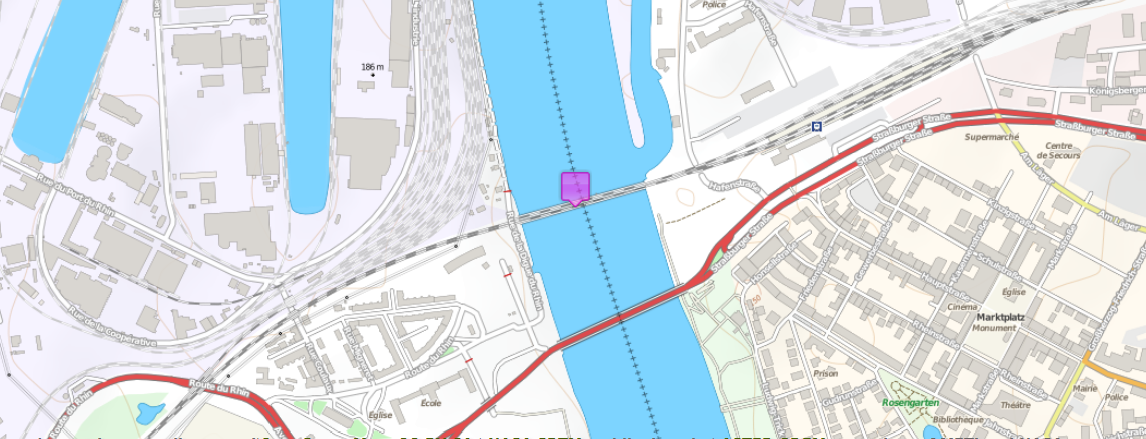
Topographical map showing the location of the current bridges. France is on the left, Germany on the right.

In July 1945 U.S. engineering troops constructed a military kit based provisional single-track bridge.

On 30 January 1953 an agreement was signed between France and Germany concerning permanent bridges and transit over the Rhine on the Franco-German frontier (Abkommen über die festen Brücken und Fähren über den Rhein an der deutsch-französischen Grenze). This included provision for new railway bridges connecting Kehl and Strasbourg. Two separate single-track bridges were envisaged, one for each direction of travel, but a second bridge of this nature was never actually built.

Work began on the first single track rail bridge in May 1954. This is a triple span post-free trellis frame steel bridge supported by a continuous beam. The bridge was opened on 12 August 1956. The frontier was set at the midpoint of the bridge: Germany owns the eastern half and France owns the western half.

== Complementing the 1956 bridge: the 2010 bridge ==
On 14 March 2006 France and Germany agreed the framework for the construction of the extended high speed LGV Est railway line. The project required that trains be able to cross the Rhine at Kehl at speeds of up to 120 km/h (75 mph) at a time when the single track 1956 bridge was restricted to 60 km/h (37 mph). Provision was therefore made for a twin track bridge. Work began in March 2008 with completion scheduled for the end of 2010.

The new bridge is in total 238.4 metres (782 ft) long, 12.2 metres (40 ft) high and 13 metres (43 ft) wide. Clearance for river traffic at high water and flood levels must be at least 7 metres (23 ft).

== See also ==
- List of international bridges
