= Konsortium Transnasional =

Public bus operator in Malaysia

Konsortium Transnasional Berhad
- Formerly: Park May Berhad
- Type: Public limited company
- Traded as: MYX: 4847
- ISIN: MYL4847OO009
- Headquarters: No. 38, Jalan Chow Kit, 50350 Kuala Lumpur, Malaysia
- Key people: Mohd Nadzmi Mohd Salleh, Chairman / Managing Director
- Website: www.ktb.com.my

Konsortium Transnasional Berhad (KTB) (MYX: 4847) is one of the largest public bus operator in Malaysia. The company provides services of stage buses and express buses covering all major cities and towns in Peninsular Malaysia as well as routes to Singapore. KTB debut on Bursa Malaysia on 15 June 2007.

With a network of over 1,500 buses operating across more than 250 routes in Peninsular Malaysia, the company provides over 1,000 daily trips and carries more than 60 million passengers annually.

Up to date, KTB is the biggest market player in Malaysia with a service brand 'Transnasional' became a major leader in the intercity express bus industry in Peninsular Malaysia. Apart from the 'Transnational', KTB also provides express bus service 'Plusliner' and luxury bus under the brand 'Nice'. Besides intercity express bus, KTB also operates stage bus 'Cityliner' and as a service provider for 'Nadiputra' for Putrajaya Corporation, & 'Go KL City Bus' a free bus service for Land Public Transport Commission (Malaysia) (SPAD).

Its operations are divided into two categories, namely express buses and stage or local buses.

== Express services ==
- Transnasional
- Plusliner
- Nice executive coaches
- SKS KL (Defunct)
- SKMK Ekspres Nasional

== Stage bus services ==
While all stage buses now operate under the unified Cityliner brand and livery, the underlying route permits remain held by specific subsidiary companies. Many of these were independent bus operators prior to their acquisition by Konsortium Transnasional Berhad (KTB).

The subsidiary companies are categorised by their operational regions:

- Kuala Lumpur & Selangor
  - Cityliner Sdn Bhd
  - Kenderaan Klang Banting Bhd
  - Kuala Selangor Omnibus Co Bhd
  - Len Chee Omnibus Co Sdn Bhd
  - Tanjung Karang Transportation Sdn Bhd
  - The Kuala Lumpur-Klang-Port Swettenham Omnibus Co Bhd
- Negeri Sembilan
  - Sistem Kenderaan Seremban - Kuala Lumpur (SKSKL)
  - Kenderaan Bas Jelebu Sdn Bhd
  - Kenderaan Bas Linggi Sdn Bhd
  - Kenderaan Bas Port Dickson Sdn Bhd
  - Kenderaan Bas Seremban Sdn Bhd
  - Syarikat Rembau Tampin
  - Syarikat Labu Sendayan
  - Starise Sdn Bhd
- Penang, Kedah & Perlis
  - Central Province Wellesley Transport Co Sdn Bhd
  - Kenderaan Langkasuka Sdn Bhd (operating under the United Transport Co brand)
  - Min Sen Omnibus Co Sdn Bhd
  - Sam Lian Omnibus Sdn Bhd
- East Coast (Kelantan & Pahang)
  - Syarikat Kenderaan Melayu Kelantan Bhd (SKMK)
  - Syarikat Tg Keramat Temerloh Utara
- Defunct
  - Airport Liner (Airport shuttle routes)

=== Routes in Selangor ===
The following is a list of stage bus routes originating from key hubs in Selangor, operated by Cityliner subsidiaries (such as Kenderaan Klang Banting).

Origin	Destination	State/Territory	Distance (km)	Frequency	First Trip	Last Trip
Banting	Kuala Lumpur	Kuala Lumpur	71	30 min	05:00	21:15
Banting	Putrajaya	Putrajaya	48	60 min	06:00	21:15
Banting	Chodoi	Selangor	21	100 min	06:00	20:00
Banting	Klang	Selangor	40	30 min	05:00	21:45
Banting	Labohan Dagang	Selangor	24	60 min	06:00	18:40
Banting	Sri Cheding	Selangor	19	100 min	06:00	18:40
Banting	Sungai Kelambu	Selangor	10	105 min	06:00	19:15
Banting	Tanjung Sepat	Selangor	30	100 min	06:00	21:20
Klang	Kuala Lumpur	Kuala Lumpur	34	20 min	05:30	21:40
Klang	Andalas / Bukit Kemuning	Selangor	16	100 min	06:10	19:40
Klang	Bandar Botanic	Selangor	15	90 min	06:00	19:30
Klang	Jalan Kebun	Selangor	18	150 min	06:15	22:10
Klang	Jaya Jusco (AEON Bukit Raja)	Selangor	5	45 min	07:30	21:45
Klang	Johan Setia	Selangor	14	100 min	06:00	21:00
Klang	Kampung Delek	Selangor	13	100 min	05:50	22:30
Klang	Kuala Selangor	Selangor	49	30 min	06:30	19:30
Klang	Meru	Selangor	13	40 min	06:00	20:00
Klang	Pulau Indah (Westport)	Selangor	50	90 min	05:30	19:30
Klang	Pandamaran Jaya	Selangor	14	100 min	05:00	22:30
Klang	Puchong (via Highway)	Selangor	38	180 min	06:00	21:00
Klang	Puncak Alam	Selangor	24	150 min	06:00	18:45
Klang	Taman Sentosa	Selangor	12	60 min	05:15	19:30
Klang	Taman Sri Muda	Selangor	18	30 min	06:00	20:30
Klang	Taman Sri Pendamar	Selangor	14	100 min	06:30	20:30
Klang	Taman Sri Sentosa	Selangor	15	60 min	05:00	19:30
Kuala Selangor	Sabak Bernam	Selangor	69	90 min	06:00	19:00
Pelabuhan Klang	Kuala Lumpur	Kuala Lumpur	45	30 min	06:00	18:30
Pelabuhan Klang	Klang	Selangor	10	20 min	06:00	22:30
Pelabuhan Klang	Pangsapuri Sultan Abdul Samad	Selangor	8	20 min	06:00	22:30
Pelabuhan Klang	Telok Gong	Selangor	16	60 min	06:00	21:30
Sri Perantau	Klang	Selangor	13	120 min	06:00	19:30

== See also ==
- Greyhound Lines
- Rapid KL
