= Wilson Pinheiro Binational Bridge =

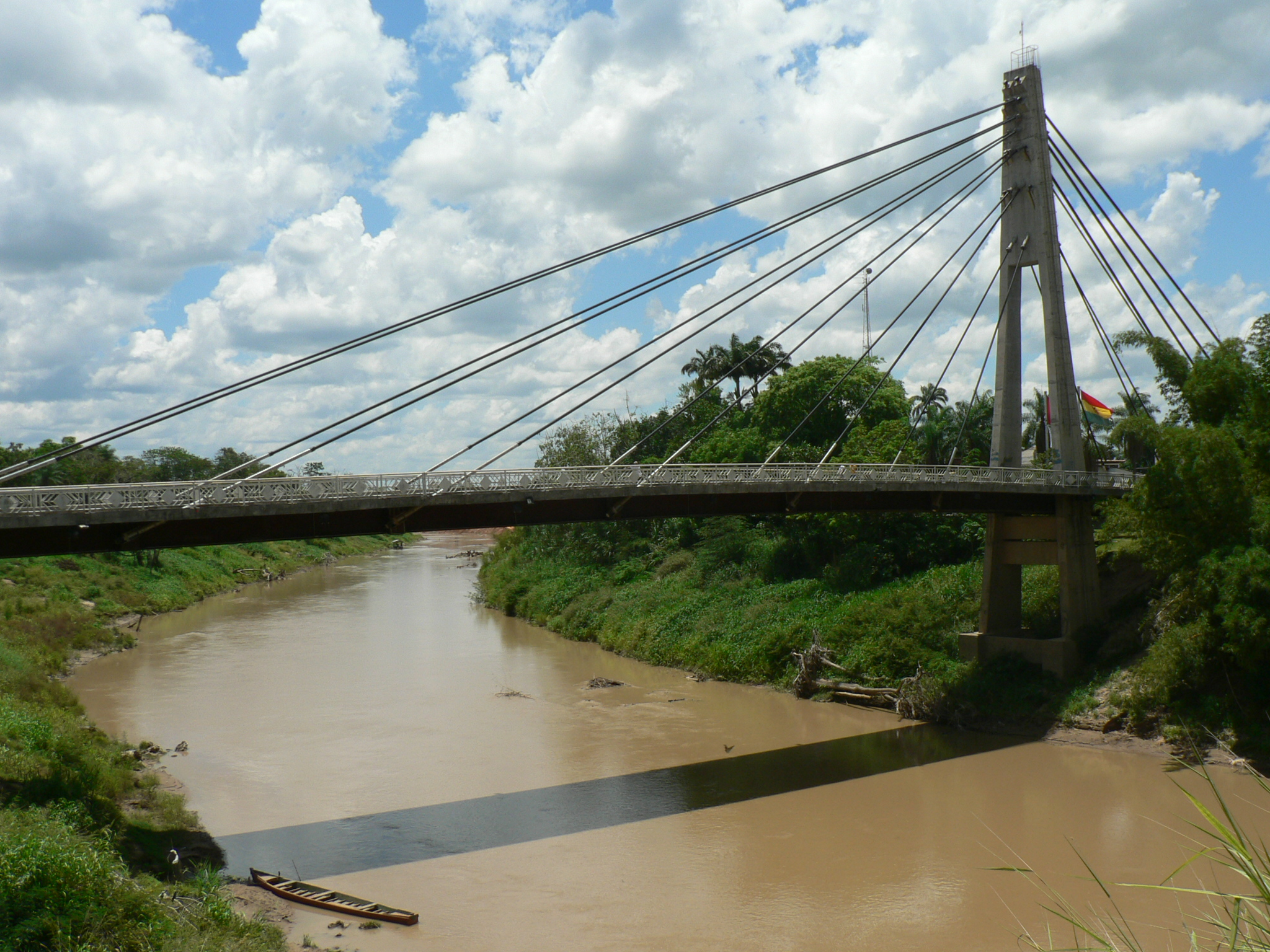
- Wilson Pinheiro Binational Bridge over the Acre River
- Coordinates: 11°00′58″S 68°45′06″W
- Crosses: Acre River
- Locale: Cobija, Pando, Bolivia; Brasileia, Acre, Brazil
- Official name: Puente de la Amistad (in Spanish); Ponte Binacional Wilson Pinheiro (in Portuguese)

Characteristics
- Design: cable-stayed bridge
- Total length: 150 metres (490 ft)
- Width: 8.60 metres (28.2 ft)

History
- Opened: 11 August 2004

Location
- Interactive map of Wilson Pinheiro Binational Bridge

The Wilson Pinheiro Binational Bridge (Spanish: Puente de la Amistad, lit. 'Friendship Bridge', Portuguese: Ponte Binacional Wilson Pinheiro) is a cable-stayed bridge that links the Bolivian city of Cobija, in the Pando Department, with the Brazilian city of Brasileia, in the state of Acre. The bridge crosses the Acre River, and its Portuguese name is named after Wilson Pinheiro, an environmentalist who was murdered in Brasileia.

== History ==
The construction of the 154 m (505 ft) long cable-stayed bridge, which cost nearly two million US dollars. was inaugurated on 11 August 2004. The presidents Carlos Mesa, Lula da Silva and Alejandro Toledo, of Bolivia, Brazil and Peru respectively, attended the inauguration of the bridge.

In February 2012, the Acre River overflowed, flooding the urban area of Cobija and Brasiléia, cutting off access to the bridge.

== Border crossing ==
No formalities are necessary when crossing the Wilson Pinheiro Binational Bridge, the soldiers stationed there do not control travelers' documents or the movement of goods. This is considerable, since the free trade zone "Zofra Cobija" exists on the Bolivian side of the border, in which prices of goods such as clothing, electronics and toys are far below those in Brazil. Therefore, many buyers come from the city of Rio Branco, which is about 230 km (140 mi) away. However, a little over a kilometer further south, there is another border crossing where most of the border traffic is processed. The project was part of the Initiative for the Integration of the Regional Infrastructure of South America.

== See also ==
- List of international bridges
