= Malacca Strait Bridge =

Proposed bridge from Indonesia to Malaysia

Malacca Strait Bridge: Jembatan Selat Malaka (Indonesian); Jambatan Selat Melaka (Malaysian)
- Coordinates: 2°15′N 101°45′E
- Carries: Motor vehicles
- Crosses: Strait of Malacca
- Locale: Dumai-Rupat Toll Road (Dupat), Indonesia; Teluk Gong-Masjid Tanah-Alor Gajah Expressway (TMA), (Malaysia)
- Official name: Malacca Strait Bridge

Characteristics
- Design: Cable-stayed bridges (two); Suspension bridge (one)
- Total length: 48 km (30 mi)

History
- Designer: Government of Malaysia; Government of Indonesia; Straits of Malacca Partners Sdn Bhd (Malaysia)

Statistics
- Toll: No

Location
- Interactive map of Malacca Strait Bridge

The Central Spine Road 2 or Malacca Strait Bridge (Indonesian: Jembatan Selat Malaka, Malaysian: Jambatan Selat Melaka or JSM and Jembatan Selmal) is a proposed bridge that would connect Telok Gong, near Masjid Tanah, Malacca in Peninsular Malaysia to Rupat Island and Dumai in Sumatra island, Indonesia. If completed, the 48-kilometre-long (30 mi) bridge will be the longest sea-crossing bridge in the world. The project will have two cable-stayed bridges and one suspension bridge, both the longest in the world.

The construction of a bridge of this kind would have numerous implications, including for the management of ship movements through the Malacca Straits, one of the busiest shipping channels in the world.

The project was submitted for review in 2013, but did not win government approval. In 2025, the state government of Melaka proposed resurrecting the project with a new feasibility study.

== Timeline ==
- In March 2013 during a visit to China, Germany, Russia and Japan, president Susilo Bambang Yudhoyono of Indonesia said that the construction of the planned Sunda Strait Bridge would have priority. He said that four years earlier he had turned down a request from Malaysia to support the construction of the Malacca Strait Bridge because the construction of such a bridge would facilitate the depletion of resources in Sumatra "by Asia".
- On 15 October 2013, the Malacca State Government revived the controversial 48-kilometre-long (30 mi) Malacca-Dumai, Indonesia, bridge project across the Straits of Malacca, after a seven-year lull. The Exim Bank of China was reportedly prepared to fund up to 85% of the cost of the project (estimated at US$14 billion) with the rest of the financing being provided from regional sovereign funds and private investors.
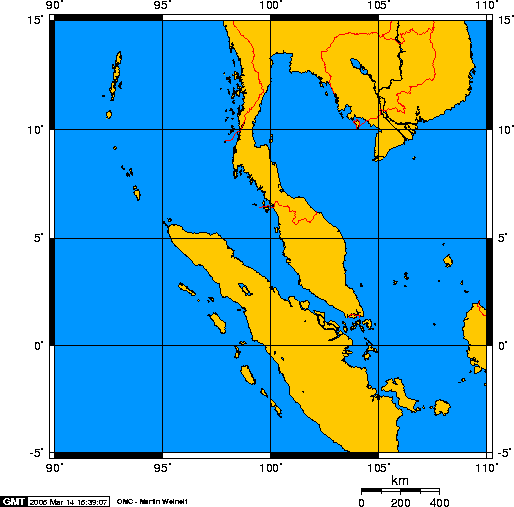
Strait of Malacca connects Pacific Ocean (east) with Indian Ocean (west)

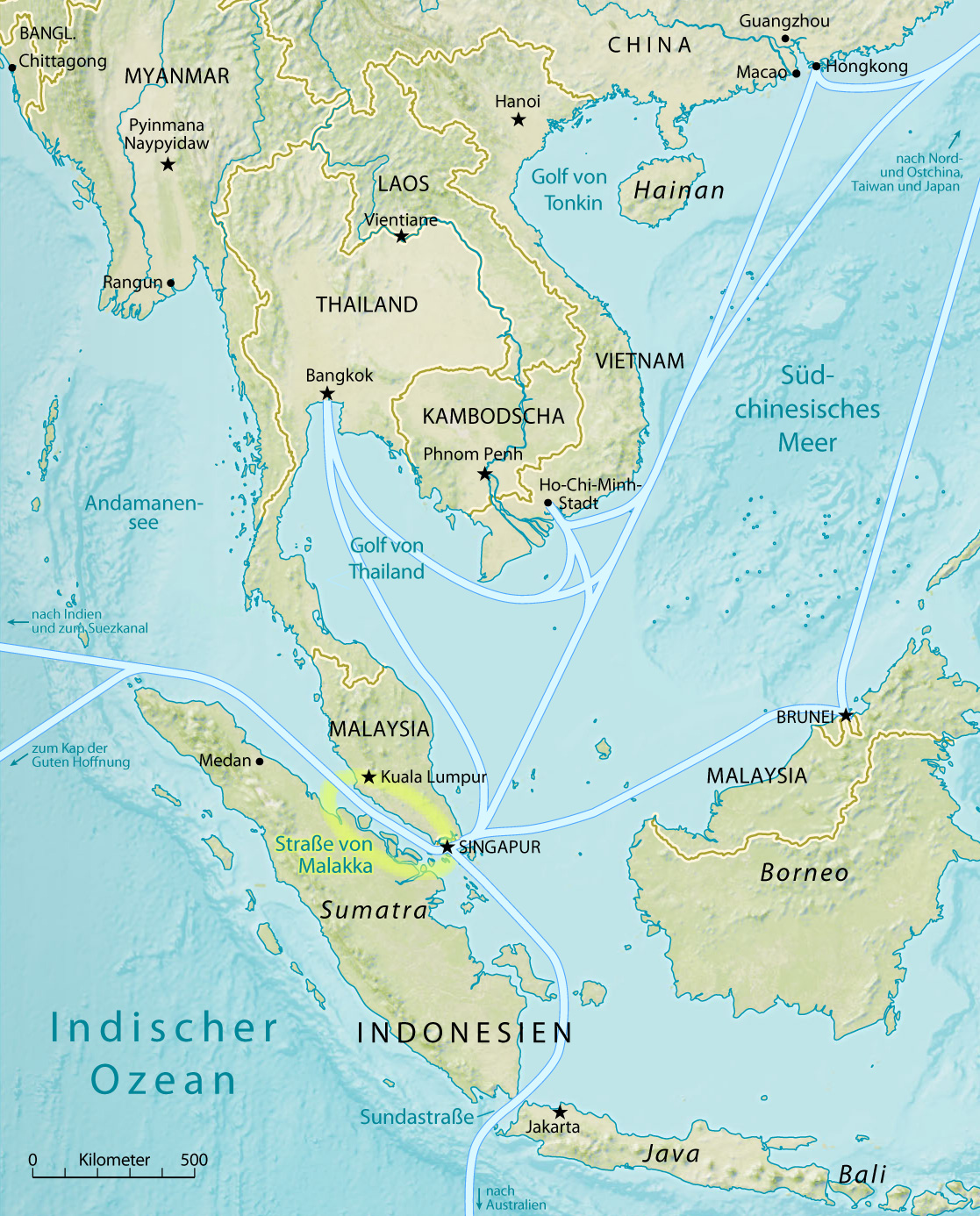
The region around the Strait of Malacca

== See also ==
- Singapore Strait crossing
- List of international bridges
