= Rupat Strait =

Strait in Indonesia

- Selat Rupat (Indonesian)
- Urban area of Dumai, shown in red. Rupat Strait separates urban area from island of Rupat.

- Location within Sumatra
- Coordinates: 1°50′00″N 101°25′00″E
- Type: strait
- Basin countries: Indonesia
- References: Selat Rupat: Indonesia National Geospatial-Intelligence Agency, Bethesda, MD, USA

The Rupat Strait (Indonesian: Selat Rupat) is the strait which separates small island of Rupat from major island of Sumatra in Indonesia. It is the main shipping route to city of Dumai.
