= Singapore Strait crossing =

Proposed tunnel or bridge spanning the Singapore Strait

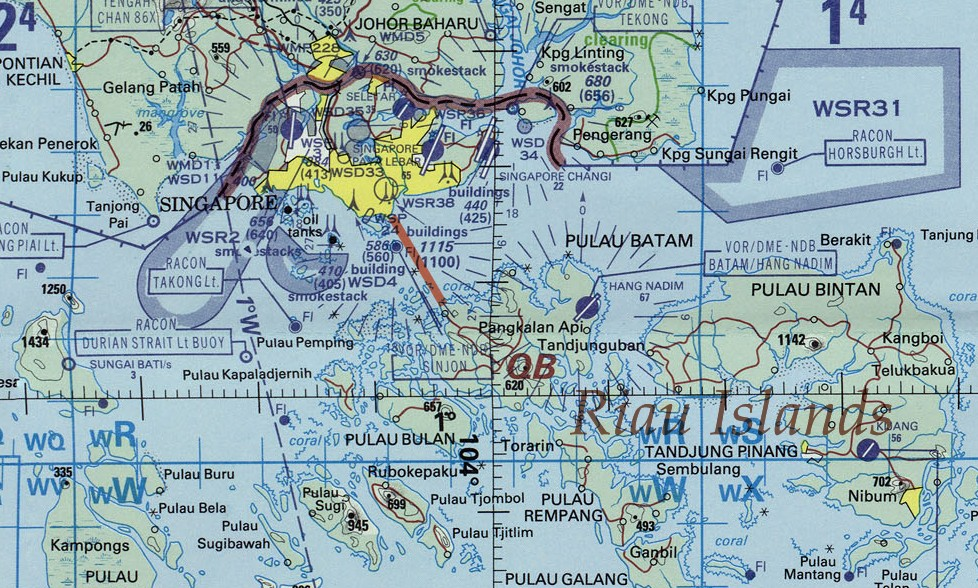
Approximate location of a Singapore Strait crossing (red)

The Singapore Strait crossing is a proposed tunnel, bridge or combination of the two spanning the Singapore Strait and linking Singapore with the Riau archipelago of Indonesia, most likely with the island of Batam. In the early 1990s the Riau Islands experienced a major economic boom in response to the development of an industrial estate on Batam, located 15 km (9 mi) southeast of Singapore. Currently, Singapore and Batam are connected only by ferry service.

Indonesian legislator Harry Azhar Azis recommended that the government work with Singapore to develop a fixed link, suggesting a bridge across the Singapore Strait would give Indonesia better access to the Asian continent following the implementation of the free trade agreement between ASEAN and China. Likewise, proponents in Singapore underscored that the bridge would position Singapore as an important intermediary for trade between Indonesia and the rest of Asia.

Though a Singapore Strait bridge could eventually play a pivotal link in a hypothetical Trans Global Highway, a Singapore Strait crossing would not yet give full access to Indonesia's road or rail system due to the lack of fixed links between Batam and mainland Indonesia. This latter corridor was identified for development in a 2011 government study, however the 250 km (160 mi) distance across a series of islands, shallow channels, and sparsely populated forest poses enormous engineering and environmental challenges.

The Singapore Strait crossing has not progressed past the proposal stage. The Malacca Strait Bridge was at the planning stage in 2012 and appeared a more likely candidate for connecting Indonesia to mainland Asia. If built, this route would bypass Singapore.

== See also ==
- Indonesia–Malaysia–Singapore Growth Triangle
- List of international bridges
