= Rupat =

Island in Riau, Indonesia

Native name: Palau Rupat (Indonesian)
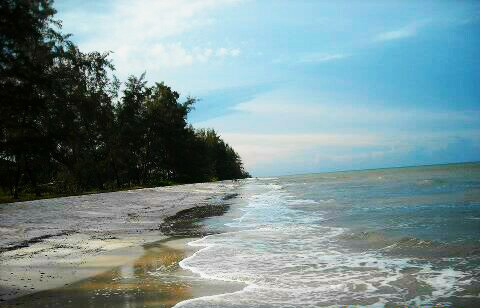
- Ketapang Beach

- Location in Riau Province

Geography
- Location: Strait of Malacca
- Coordinates: 1°54′N 101°36′E
- Area: 1,520.86 km^{2} (587.21 sq mi)

Administration
- Indonesia
- Province: Riau
- Regency: Bengkalis Regency

Demographics
- Population: 50,803 (mid 2024)
- Pop. density: 33.4/km^{2} (86.5/sq mi)

Rupat (Indonesian: Pulau Rupat) is an island in the Strait of Malacca, and forms part of Bengkalis Regency within Riau, Indonesia. It lies just off the eastern coast of Sumatra, across from Dumai city, from which it is separated by the Rupat Strait (Indonesian: Selat Rupat). Its area is 1,520.86 km^{2} (587.21 mi^{2}). The island is sparsely populated (50,803 in mid-2024), with an average population density of 33.4 per km^{2}. Rupat was one of thousands of abandoned islands, but its population is growing yearly, which has made the government expand the area for the settlement.

The island is administratively divided into two districts (kecamatan) of Bengkalis Regency.
Rupat District comprises the southern 75.2% of the island, covering 1,143.72 km^{2}, with 30,550 inhabitants at the 2010 Census and 34,719 at the 2020 Census; the official estimate in mid 2024 was 36,307 inhabitants; it is sub-divided into four urban communities (kelurahan) and twelve rural villages (desa), all sharing the postcode of 28781. The main town is at Batu Panjang on the south coast of the island, which faces Dumai city across the Rupat Strait.
North Rupat District (Rupat Utara) covers the northern 21.6% of the island, with an area of 377.14 km^{2} and with 13,020 inhabitants at the 2010 Census and 14,117 at the 2020 Census; the official estimate in mid 2024 was 14,496 inhabitants; it is sub-divided into eight villages (all rural desa), all sharing the postcode of 28782, with the village of Tanjung Medang being home to the district administration.

== Communities ==
The two districts comprise four urban communities (kelurahan, listed first in the table below) and twenty rural villages (desa), listed below with their areas and their populations as officially estimated for mid 2023 although the mid-2024 estimates show a substantially lesser population.

| Kode Wilayah | Name of kelurahan or desa | Area in km^{2} | Pop'n Estimate mid 2023 |
|---|---|---|---|
| 14.03.10.1001 | Batu Panjang | 138.18 | 5,038 |
| 14.03.10.1002 | Pergam | 98.58 | 3,192 |
| 14.03.10.1003 | Terkul | 101.17 | 4,616 |
| 14.03.10.1004 | Tanjung Kapal | 264.64 | 4,137 |
| 14.03.10.2005 | Sei Cingam | 48.87 | 2,565 |
| 14.03.10.2006 | Teluk Lecah | 70.56 | 2,507 |
| 14.03.10.2007 | Makeruh | 24.08 | 1,554 |
| 14.03.10.2008 | Hutan Panjang | 39.24 | 2,311 |
| 14.03.10.2009 | Pangkalan Nyirih | 14.38 | 2,941 |
| 14.03.10.2010 | Sukarjo Mesin | 38.68 | 2,060 |
| 14.03.10.2011 | Darul Aman | 101.55 | 2,108 |
| 14.03.10.2012 | Parit Kebumen | 9.20 | 2,493 |
| 14.03.10.2013 | Sri Tanjung | 41.32 | 2,519 |
| 14.03.10.2014 | Pancur Jaya | 12.95 | 2,354 |
| 14.03.10.2015 | Pangkalan Pinang | 11.54 | 1,553 |
| 14.03.10.2016 | Dungun Baru | 121.36 | 2,277 |
| 14.03.10 | Totals Rupat District | 1,336.30 | 44,225 |

| Kode Wilayah | Name of desa | Area in km^{2} | Pop'n Estimate mid 2023 |
|---|---|---|---|
| 14.03.11.2001 | Tanjung Medan | 33.86 | 3,018 |
| 14.03.11.2002 | Teluk Rhu | 18.42 | 2,612 |
| 14.03.11.2003 | Tanjung Punak | 13.63 | 1,330 |
| 14.03.11.2004 | Kador | 20.05 | 2,139 |
| 14.03.11.2005 | Titi Akar | 208.12 | 4,162 |
| 14.03.11.2006 | Hutan Ayu | 35.77 | 1,107 |
| 14.03.11.2007 | Sukadamai | 25.12 | 914 |
| 14.03.11.2008 | Putri Sembilan | 13.71 | 1,731 |
| 14.03.11 | Totals Rupat Utara District | 368.68 | 17,013 |

== Proposed Malacca Strait Bridge ==
There is a proposal by the Malaysian government with Chinese financial backing to build a bridge from Melaka to Rupat and thence to Dumai, to be called the Malacca Strait Bridge, though Jakarta seems to prefer to build the Sunda Strait Bridge first.

== Raptor bird migration ==
Together with the Sangihe Islands, Rupat is located in the East Asian-Australasian Flyway, a corridor used by bird of prey for migration. 24 of the 56 kinds of Asian raptors can be found in both locations. From September to November, up to 2,000 raptors migrate to Rupat every day, while migration out happens from February to April.
