= Concordia Tunnel =

Proposed tunnel between Bolivia and an artificial island in the Pacific Ocean

Coordinates: 18°23′46″S 70°24′01″W

The Concordia Tunnel is a proposed tunnel between Bolivia and an artificial island in the Pacific Ocean. The tunnel would run under the line of concord between Chile and Peru, and give Bolivia access to the sea for the first time since the War of the Pacific. The 150 km (93 mi) tunnel would run from the Bolivian border to an artificial island created in the Pacific Ocean from earth dug to build the tunnel. The proposal was made by Chilean architects Carlos Martner, Fernando Castillo Velasco and Humberto Eliash, and has some political support from Chilean Foreign Minister Mariano Fernández.
