= Timor-Leste–Indonesia–Australia Growth Triangle =

Trilateral economic cooperation agreement

The Timor-Leste–Indonesia–Australia Growth Triangle (TIA-GT) is a combined initiative of the regions of Eastern Indonesia, Northern Australia, and the Democratic Republic of Timor-Leste. This initiative aims to promote and foster economic growth through integrated economic development in the region that these nations reside in. The growth triangle was created in 2012, after a meeting was held by Indonesian president Susilo Bambang Yudhoyono with Prime Minister of Australia Julia Gillard and Timor-Leste Prime Minister Xanana Gusmao. The initiative aims to support economic, social, and cultural development primarily by attracting investment, developing manufacturing industries, enhancing human capital, and overall building a stronger cooperative relationship between the three countries involved. The initiative also aimed to accelerate the accession of Timor-Leste into the Association of Southeast Asian Nations (ASEAN) and to fulfill goals set by Timor-Leste's Strategic Development Plan, such as increasing the nation's economic prosperity and stability. The growth triangle is often misinterpreted as a free-trade zone; however, while there are elements of free trade agreements between Indonesia and Australia specifically, the terms of the growth triangle initiative are not directly linked to these free trade agreements, and the goals of the growth triangle do not specifically encompass free trade between the three nations.

== Background ==
The Growth Triangle developed as a result of each country recognizing varied benefits for involvement in a combined initiative. The Indonesian government believes that the initiative would provide an opportunity to develop and economically strengthen the Eastern regions of Indonesia. The Australian government cites benefits of diversifying the country's mining-based industry and bringing positive development to the Northern city of Darwin and surrounding areas. Timor-Leste sees the potential to become a manufacturing and logistic center for raw materials and semi-processed products of the surrounding Indonesian islands. All three countries understand the initiative to be mutually beneficial, as it links the infrastructure, capital, and expertise of Australia with the land, labor, and natural resources of Timor-Leste and the technology and labor resources of Indonesia, thereby ensuring that each country benefits from the arrangement.

== Background of Countries Involved in the Growth Triangle ==
All three countries are located in the Asia Pacific region.

Country	Area km^{2}	Population (2017)	Population Density (per km^{2}, 2016)
Australia	7 688 287 km^{2}	24 598 933	3.1
Indonesia	1 904 569 km^{2}	263 991 379	144.14
Timor-Leste	14 874 km^{2}	1 296 311	85.29

Since the 16th century CE, Timor-Leste was subject to Portuguese colonization. On 28 November 1975, the declaration of the Revolutionary Front for an Independent East Timor allowed Timor-Leste to gain its independence. Nine days later, Timor-Leste was invaded, occupied, and declared a province of Indonesia. Though relations between Australia and Indonesia were generally positive prior to this event, during the Indonesian occupation of Timor-Leste, Australian officials and the public expressed dissent against the occupation. In 1999, Timor-Leste created an act of self-determination; this was sponsored by the United Nations, which recognized Timor-Leste as an independent sovereign state. Australia was involved in the subsequent stabilization of Timor-Leste, including leading a multi-national peacekeeping force in this time. Australia continues to be a major supporter for Timor-Leste. However, relations have worsened in the wake of the Australia–East Timor spying scandal.

== History of the Growth Triangle ==
The Growth Triangle has been the result of numerous meetings and negotiations between the three nations. The Minister of Economy and Development of Timor-Leste, João Gonçalves, proposed the growth triangle to President of Indonesia Susilo Bambang Yudhoyono as a project to support the economies and institutions of the involved nations. In April 2011, former Chief Minister of the Northern Territory of Australia Paul Henderson expressed interest in being involved in this initiative. In January 2012, Australia and Indonesia organized a free trade zone within their territory as a result of an agreement among ASEAN, Australia, and New Zealand. In May 2012, a report to the Commonwealth Government of Australia highlighted the potential for cooperation between Australia, Timor-Leste, and Indonesia. The report particularly considered:

1. Development and implementation programs in several sectors to increase the connection between these countries;
2. Possibility to spread these programs among other islands;
3. Establishment of a Joint Task Force under a Memorandum of Understanding;
4. Report its progress to the bilateral Sub-Committee on Economic Cooperation.

Since the Growth Triangle's formation, Australia, Timor-Leste, and Indonesia have all implemented several initiatives that bring benefits to members of the growth triangle. In September 2013, Timor-Leste launched a Mission Unit for the negotiation of a platform for cooperation in Timor-Leste, Indonesia, and Australia. In March 2016, representatives of all three countries met and discussed a "tourism path" between Bali and Darwin, which would lead through islands of Flores and Timor and bring an economic boost to all three nations. In July 2018, Australia expressed support for Timor-Leste's intentions to join both ASEAN and the World Trade Organization (WTO). Australia also committed to assisting with the future application for Timor-Leste to join the Commonwealth of Nations. In August 2018, Australia and Indonesia renewed negotiations on the Indonesia-Australia Comprehensive Economic Partnership Agreement (IA-CEPA), which includes deals between the nations relating to freeing trade, lowering tariffs, and instating certain tariff-free conditions for trade between Indonesia and Australia.

== ASEAN and Countries from the Growth Triangle ==
The Association of Southeast Asian Nations (ASEAN) is a regional intergovernmental organization connecting ten countries in Southeast Asia for mutual cooperation and the integration of each country's economy, politics, security, military, education, and culture. As of October 2025, ASEAN's members include Brunei, Cambodia, Indonesia, Laos, Malaysia, Myanmar, Philippines, Singapore, Thailand, Timor-Leste, and Vietnam.

While Australia is not a member of ASEAN, it is one of the ASEAN Plus Six, which includes an additional six nations with strong economic, political, security, and socio-cultural presence both globally and within the Asia-Pacific. Other nations included in ASEAN Plus Six are China, Japan, South Korea, India, and New Zealand.

== Other Growth Triangles and Areas ==
The concept of the Growth Triangle was inspired by the success of other cooperative initiatives among countries in Southeast Asia and Oceania. These sub-regional initiatives usually focus on less developed countries that have less-developed infrastructure and intra-regional connectivity. Hence, most projects planned and approved by the initiatives primarily involve infrastructure projects, trade, transport facilitation, and investment promotion and facilitation.

Examples of other growth triangles and areas that have been formed include:

- Greater Mekong Subregion (GMS)
- East ASEAN Growth Area (BIMPT-EAGA)
- Indonesia–Malaysia–Thailand Growth Triangle (IMT-GT)
- Indonesia–Malaysia–Singapore Growth Triangle (SIJORI Growth Triangle)
- Cambodia–Laos–Vietnam Development Triangle (CLV Development Triangle)

== See also ==
- East Timor–Indonesia relations
- Foreign relations of Timor-Leste
- Foreign relations of Australia
- Foreign relations of Indonesia
- Australia–Timor-Leste relations
- Australia–Indonesia relations
