= Indonesia–Malaysia–Thailand Growth Triangle =

Attempt at economic liberalisation and integration in ASEAN

The Indonesia–Malaysia–Thailand Growth Triangle (IMT-GT) started as an early attempt at economic liberalisation & integration in ASEAN. It was formally endorsed by Indonesia's President Suharto, Malaysia's Prime Minister Mahathir Mohamad and Thailand's Prime Minister Chuan Leekpai in 1993.

The Indonesia-Malaysia-Thailand Growth Triangle (IMT-GT) subregional program aims to stimulate economic development in 32 of these three countries’ less-developed states and provinces, which are home to over 54 million people.

The IMT-GT consists of:

- 14 provinces in southern Thailand: Krabi, Nakhon Si Thammarat, Narathiwat, Pattani, Phattalung, Satun, Songkhla, Trang, Yala, Chumphon, Ranong, Surat Thani, Phang Nga, and Phuket;
- 8 northern states of Peninsular Malaysia: Kedah, Kelantan, Melaka, Negeri Sembilan, Penang, Perak, Perlis, and Selangor; and
- 10 provinces of Sumatra, Indonesia: Aceh, Bangka-Belitung, Bengkulu, Jambi, Lampung, North Sumatra, Riau, Riau Islands, South Sumatra, and West Sumatra.

The Asian Development Bank subsequently undertook a detailed feasibility study & formulated the framework for co-operation. The study concluded that the IMT-GT had great potential to stimulate cross-border economic integration in 6 priority areas, namely: Infrastructure Development; Agriculture & Fisheries; Trade; Tourism; Human Resource Development; and Professional Services.

== The IMT-GT JBC ==
The IMT-GT Joint Business Council (IMT-GT JBC) was inaugurated in 1995 as the official vehicle to mobilise private sector participation & involvement in the IMT-GT. Between 1995 and 2005, the IMT-GT JBC facilitated the investment of an estimated US$3.80 billion worth of new projects in the IMT-GT region.

== IMT-GT Goals ==
The overall goal of the IMT-GT is to accelerate private sector-led economic growth in the IMT-GT region by:

- a. Increasing trade & investment by exploiting the underlying economic complementariness and comparative advantages;
- b. Increasing exports to the rest of the world by enhancing competitiveness for exports and investment;
- c. Increasing the welfare of the people by creating employment, educational, social and cultural opportunities in the IMT-GT region;
- d. Encouraging the private sector to play a leading role, while the public sector facilitates and supports as much as possible

== See also ==
- Indonesia–Malaysia–Singapore Growth Triangle
- Timor Leste–Indonesia–Australia Growth Triangle
- Brunei–Indonesia–Malaysia–Philippines East ASEAN Growth Area (BIMP-EAGA)
- Cambodia–Laos–Vietnam Development Triangle Area (CLV-DTA)
