= Telok Gong =

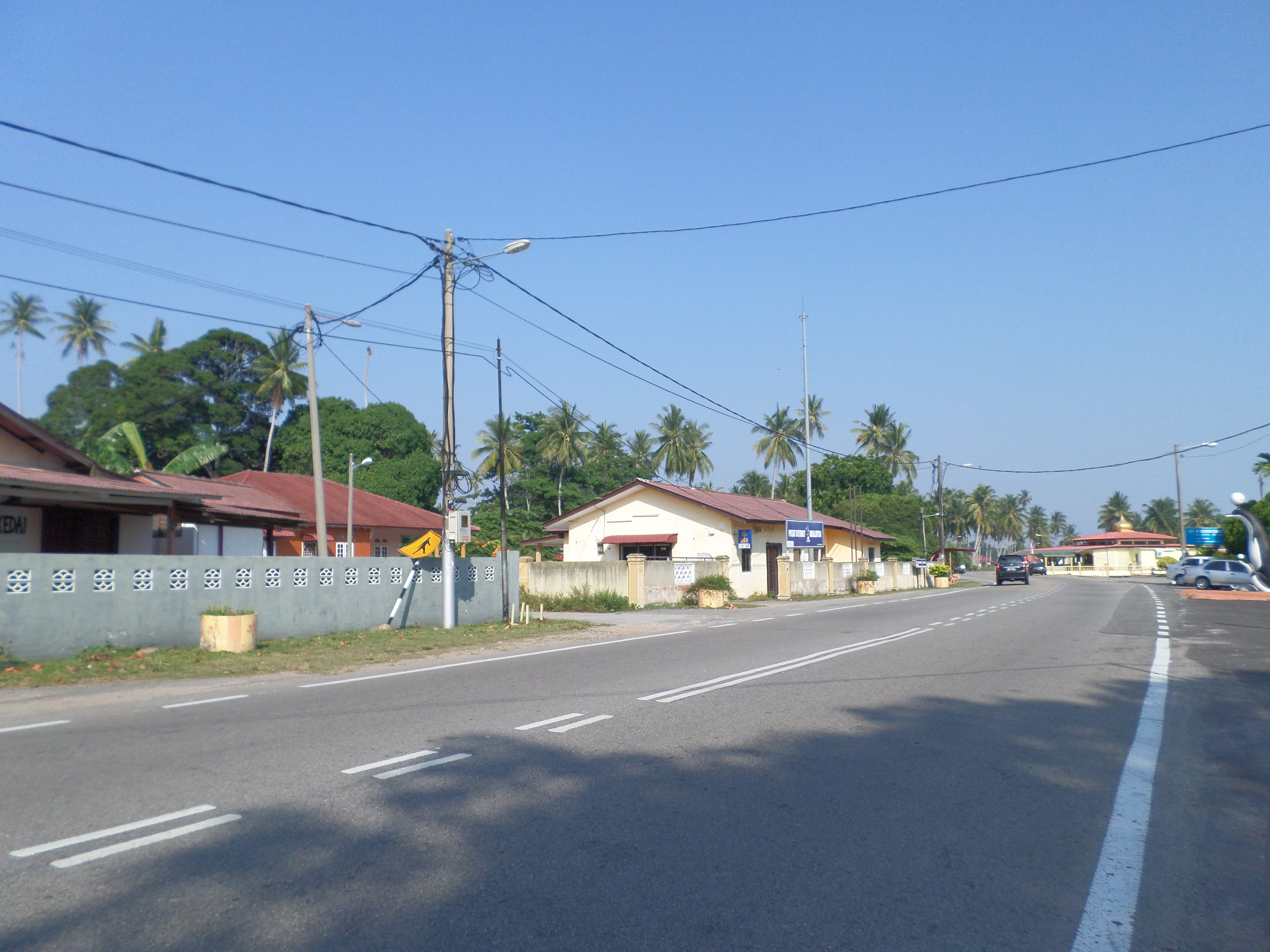
Telok Gong

Telok Gong is a village near Masjid Tanah in Alor Gajah District, Malacca, Malaysia.

== Infrastructure ==
- Telok Gong Power Station 1
- Telok Gong Power Station 2

== See also ==
- Malacca Strait Bridge, as Telok Gong was the proposed site for the Malaysian side of the bridge to Indonesia
