= Grosbliederstroff =

- Commune
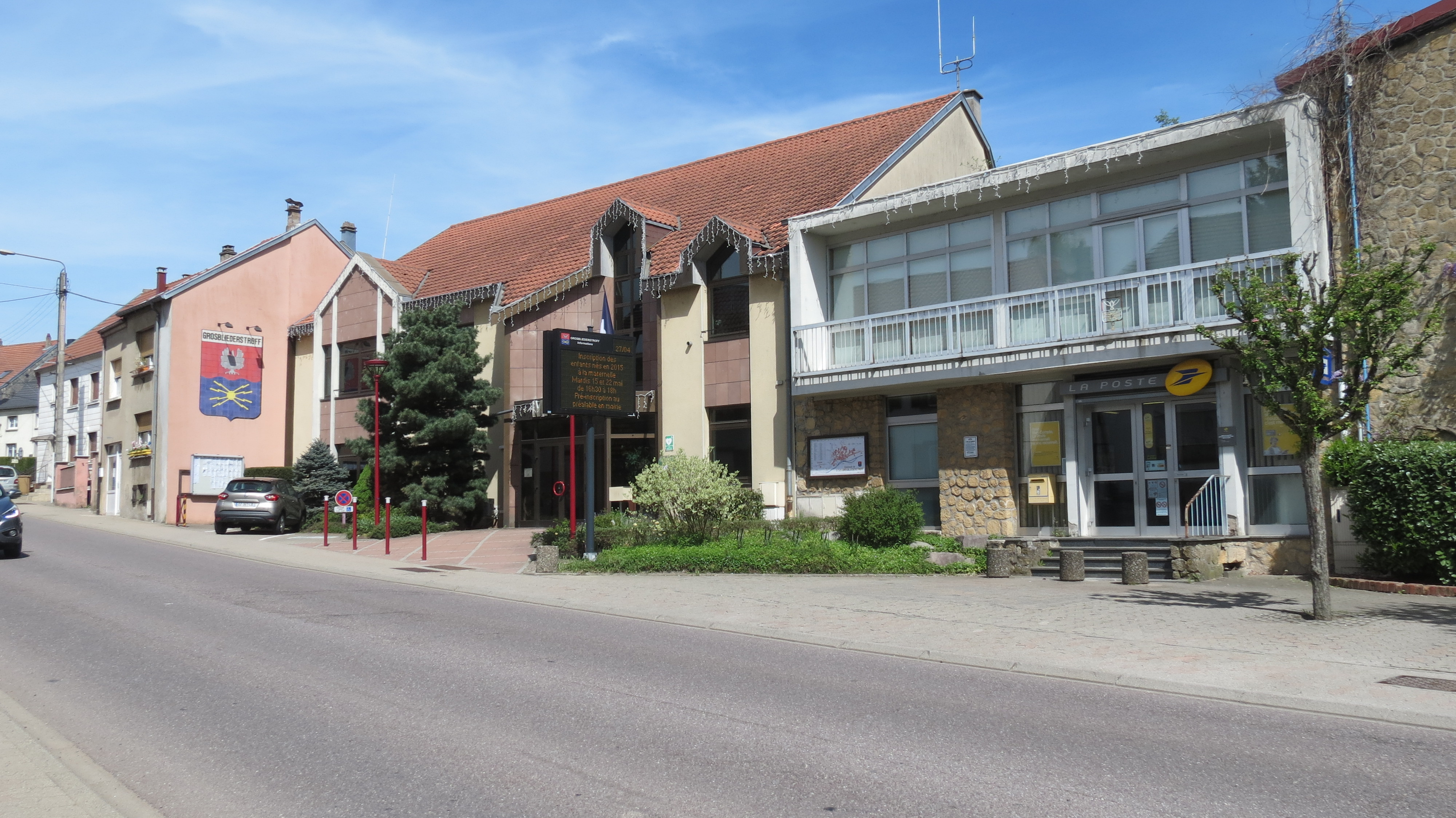
- City hall and post office

- Coat of arms
- Location of Grosbliederstroff
- Location within France Location within Grand Est
- Coordinates: 49°10′N 7°02′E
- Country: France
- Region: Grand Est
- Department: Moselle
- Arrondissement: Sarreguemines
- Canton: Sarreguemines
- Intercommunality: CA Sarreguemines Confluences

Government
  - Mayor (2020–2026): Pascal Weisslinger
- Area^{1}: 13.07 km^{2} (5.05 sq mi)
- Elevation: 189 m (620 ft)
- Highest elevation: 357 m (1,171 ft)
- Lowest elevation: 105 m (344 ft)
- Population (2023): 3,346
  - Density: 256.0/km^{2} (663.1/sq mi)
- Time zone: UTC+01:00 (CET)
  - Summer (DST): UTC+02:00 (CEST)
- INSEE/Postal code: 57260 /57520
- ^{1} French Land Register data, which excludes lakes, ponds, glaciers > 1 km^{2} (0.386 sq mi or 247 acres) and river estuaries.

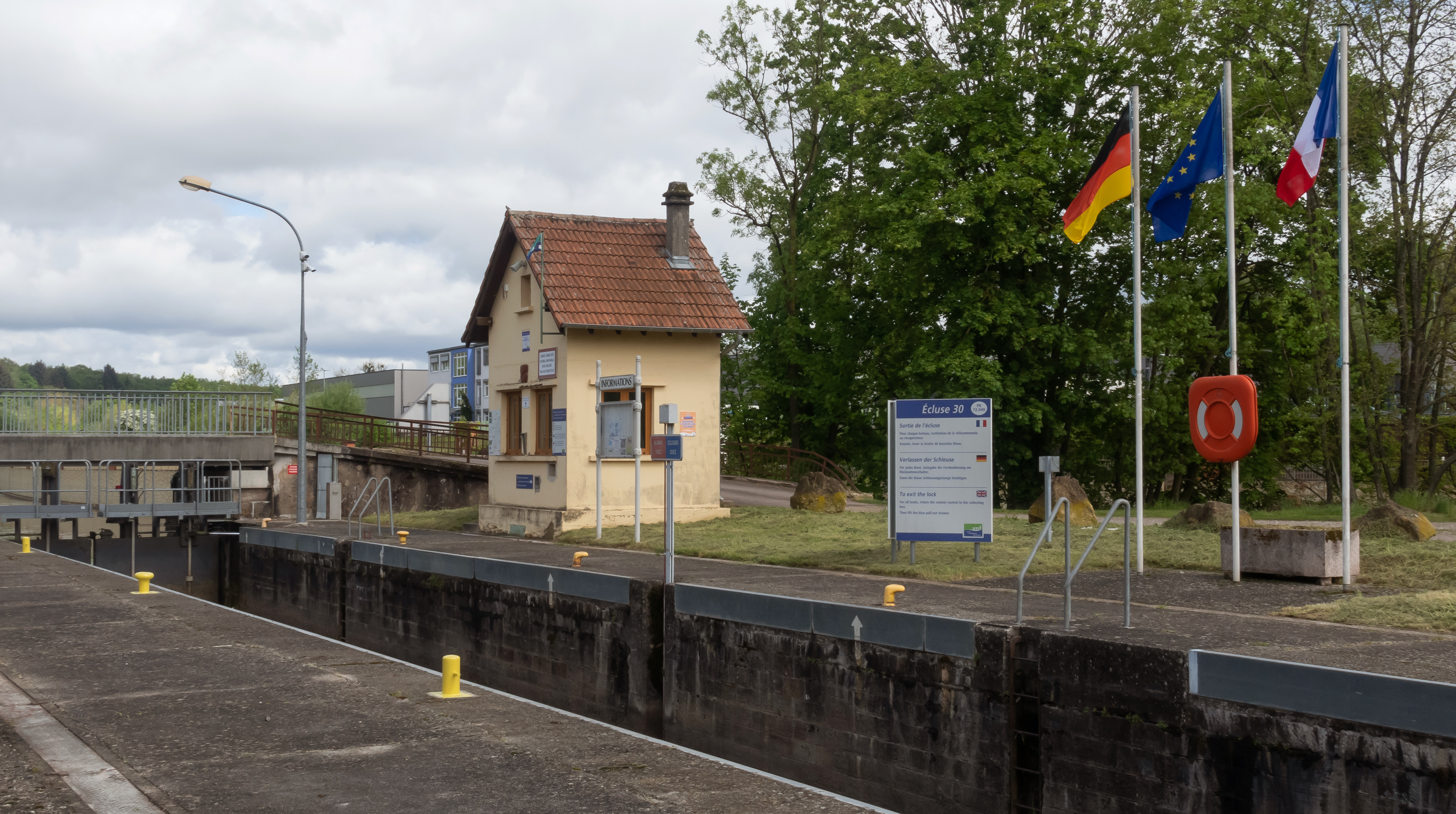
Grossbliederstroff, Schleuse

Grosbliederstroff (French pronunciation: [ɡʁosblidɛʁstʁɔf]; German: Großblittersdorf, lit. 'Big Blittersdorf', in contrast to "Little Blittersdorf") is a commune in the Moselle department in Grand Est in north-eastern France.

It borders the German towns of Saarbrücken (180,000 inhabitants) and Kleinblittersdorf.

Grosbliederstroff is connected to Kleinblittersdorf by a bridge and from there to Saarbrücken by tramway, and to French highways A320 and A4.

== Geography ==
Grosbliederstroff is situated on the left bank of the river Saar (Sarre), opposite the German village Kleinblittersdorf, and about midway between Saarbrücken and Sarreguemines.

=== Climate ===
Climate data for Grosbliederstroff
Month	Jan	Feb	Mar	Apr	May	Jun	Jul	Aug	Sep	Oct	Nov	Dec	Year
Mean daily maximum °C (°F)	3 (37)	4 (39)	9 (48)	13 (55)	18 (64)	21 (70)	23 (73)	23 (73)	19 (66)	14 (57)	7 (45)	4 (39)	13 (56)
Mean daily minimum °C (°F)	−1 (30)	−1 (30)	−2 (28)	4 (39)	8 (46)	11 (52)	13 (55)	13 (55)	10 (50)	7 (45)	2 (36)	0 (32)	5 (42)
Average precipitation mm (inches)	54 (2.1)	42 (1.7)	38 (1.5)	38 (1.5)	46 (1.8)	49 (1.9)	50 (2.0)	40 (1.6)	39 (1.5)	52 (2.0)	59 (2.3)	61 (2.4)	568 (22.3)
Source: worldweather.org

== Population ==
Historical population
Year	Pop.	±% p.a.
1968	3,218	—
1975	3,279	+0.27%
1982	3,163	−0.51%
1990	3,092	−0.28%
1999	3,334	+0.84%
2007	3,305	−0.11%
2012	3,321	+0.10%
2017	3,303	−0.11%
2023	3,346	+0.22%
Source: INSEE

== History ==
777: Foundation

Former names:

- 777 : Blithario Villa
- 1220 : Bliederstroff
- 1223 : Bliderstorff
- 1594 : Grossblietersdorff
- 1756 : Blidertorf-le-Grand
- 1779 : Blidestroff-le-Gros

== Sister cities ==
- Kleinblittersdorf (Germany)

== See also ==
- Communes of the Moselle department
