= Lupilichi =

- Location within Mozambique
- Coordinates: 11°45′26″S 35°13′28″E
- Country: Mozambique
- Provinces: Niassa Province
- District: Lago District

Lupilichi is a village in Niassa Province in northwestern Mozambique. It is located approximately 25 kilometres south of the border with Tanzania. The area is noted for its gold reserves and in 1995 it was reported that some 13 tonnes of primary and alluvial gold deposits were illegally mined by Zaireans, Tanzanians and Kenyans in Lupilichi.
