= Kleinblittersdorf =

- Municipality
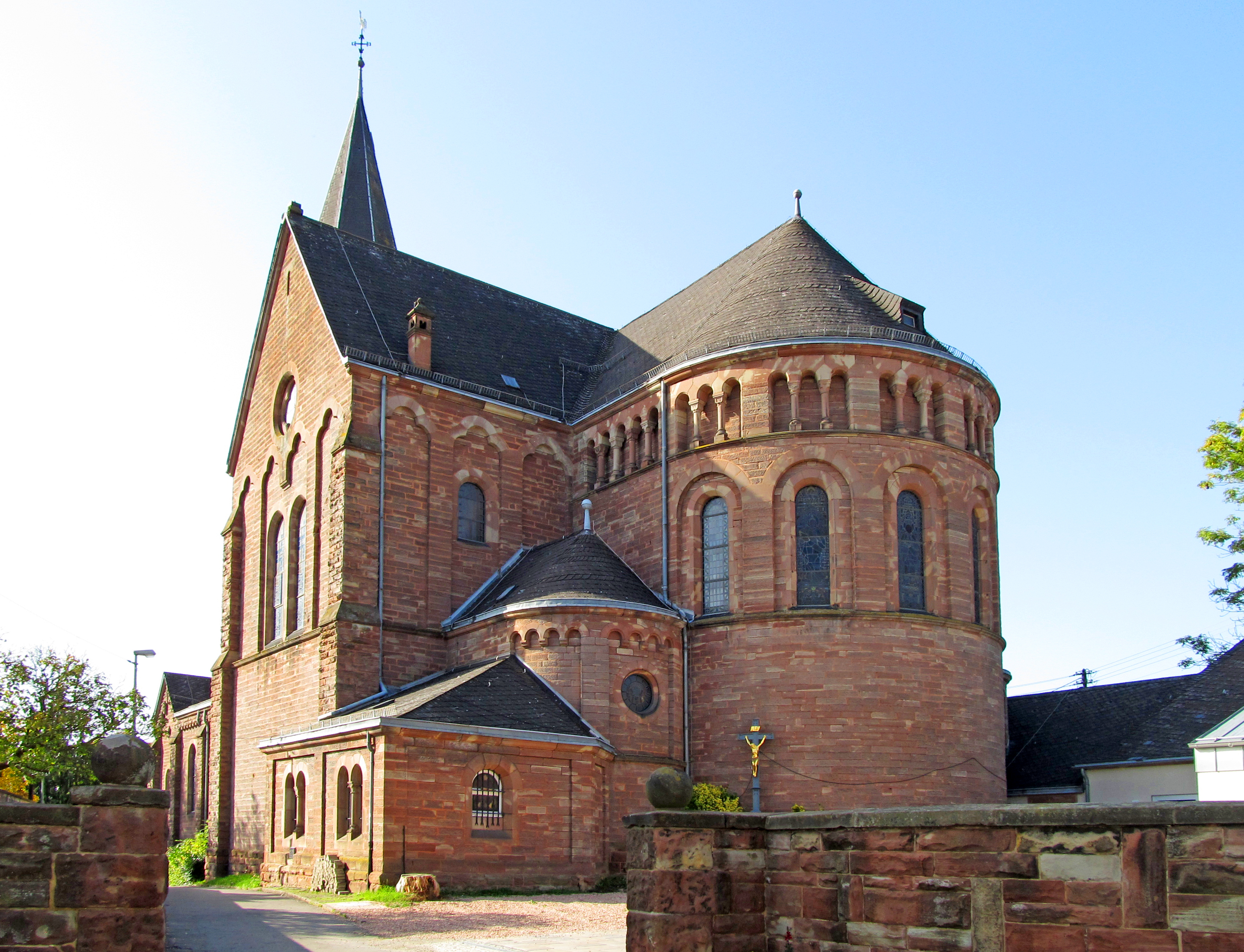
- Church of Saint Agatha

- Coat of arms

- Location of Kleinblittersdorf within Saarbrücken district
- Interactive map of Kleinblittersdorf
- Location within Germany Location within Saarland
- Coordinates: 49°09′30″N 7°02′10″E
- Country: Germany
- State: Saarland
- District: Saarbrücken
- Subdivisions: 5

Government
  - Mayor (2019–29): Rainer Lang (SPD)

Area
  - Total: 27.29 km^{2} (10.54 sq mi)
- Elevation: 197–342 m (646–1,122 ft)

Population (2025-12-31)
  - Total: 10,734
  - Density: 393.3/km^{2} (1,019/sq mi)
- Time zone: UTC+01:00 (CET)
  - Summer (DST): UTC+02:00 (CEST)
- Postal codes: 66266–66271
- Dialling codes: 06805
- Vehicle registration: SB
- Website: www.kleinblittersdorf.de

Kleinblittersdorf (German pronunciation: [ˌklaɪnˈblɪtɐsdɔʁf], lit. 'Little Blittersdorf', in contrast to "Big Blittersdorf"; French: Kleinbliederstroff) is a village and a municipality in the district of Saarbrücken, in Saarland, Germany. It is situated on the river Saar, opposite Grosbliederstroff in France, approx. 10 km south of Saarbrücken.
